= Seth Brown =

Seth Brown may refer to:

- Seth W. Brown (1841–1923), U.S. Representative from Ohio
- Seth Brown (baseball) (born 1992), American baseball player
