= Ohio's 6th congressional district =

U.S. House district for Ohio

Coordinates: 38°45′N 83°0′W

- Interactive map of district boundaries
- Representative: Michael Rulli; R–Salem
- Distribution: 57.32% rural; 42.68% urban
- Population (2025): 774,401
- Median household income: $63,984
- Ethnicity: 85.6% White; 6.3% Black; 4.0% Two or more races; 3.2% Hispanic; 0.5% Asian; 0.5% other
- Cook PVI: R+16

Ohio's 6th congressional district is a U.S. congressional district which is represented by Representative Michael Rulli of the Republican Party. Rulli was elected to the seat after he defeated Democrat Michael Kripchak in the June 11, 2024 special election, caused by the resignation of incumbent Bill Johnson (R) on January 21, 2024.

This district runs along the eastern side of the state, bordering West Virginia and Pennsylvania. It stretches from Marietta through several Ohio River industrial towns, and along the perimeter of Canton, north, all the way to the city of Youngstown. The district ranks third in the state with the poverty rate at 15.4 percent, per a 2026 congressional study.

== History ==
When Bob McEwen was first elected in 1980, the sixth district of Ohio consisted of Adams, Brown, Clinton, Fayette, Highland, Pickaway, Pike, Scioto and Ross counties plus Clermont County outside the city of Loveland, Harrison Township in Vinton County and the Warren County townships of Clearcreek, Deerfield, Hamilton, Harlan, Massie, Salem and Wayne. At that time, The Washington Post described the sixth district as "a fail-safe Republican district".

The Ohio General Assembly redrew the sixth district following the results of the 1980 United States census. The boundaries from 1983 to 1987 included all of Adams, Clinton, Fayette, Highland, Hocking, Jackson, Pike, Ross, Scioto, Vinton and Warren counties, plus Waterloo and York townships in Athens County; Wayne Township in Clermont County; Concord, Jasper, Marion, Perry, Union and Wayne townships in Fayette County; and Washington Township and the cities of Miamisburg and West Carrollton in Montgomery County.

Beginning with the 100th Congress in 1987, adjustments were made by the legislature to the boundaries; reapportionment between censuses is unusual in American politics. A small part of the Montgomery County territory was detached, as were parts of Fayette County in Washington Court House in Union Township and the townships of Jasper and Marion. Part of Brown County was added, Jackson and Eagle Townships. These were the boundaries for the rest of McEwen's service in Congress.

The district was largely rural and agricultural with no large cities. One of the major industries was the United States Department of Energy's Portsmouth Gaseous Diffusion Plant at Piketon, which manufactured uranium for nuclear weapons. The district was 97 per cent white with a median household income of $21,761 in the early 1990s.

In 1992, the district was altered significantly to accommodate Ohio's loss of two House seats in redistricting. The state legislature anticipated that Clarence Miller of the neighboring Tenth District would retire, and thus combined the southern end of his district (which included Athens, Gallipolis, and Ironton) with most of the area previously represented by McEwen. Although the district did not include Miller's hometown of Lancaster, Miller decided not to retire and instead challenged McEwen in the Sixth District primary in 1992. The campaign was bitter, and McEwen eked out only a narrow victory. In November, McEwen was upset by Democrat Ted Strickland, a prison psychologist. Strickland himself was defeated in 1994 by Republican Frank Cremeans, but won the seat back in 1996.

For 2002 the district was shifted dramatically eastward. At the same time, it effectively ended the career of James Traficant in the neighboring 17th District by placing his hometown of Poland into the 6th. Traficant opted to run in his old district and lost. The district currently includes all of Belmont, Carroll, Columbiana, Gallia, Guernsey, Jackson, Jefferson, Lawrence, Meigs, Monroe, Noble and Washington counties, and portions of Athens, Mahoning, Muskingum, Scioto and Tuscarawas counties.

In 2010, Republican Bill Johnson defeated incumbent Democrat Charles Wilson, returning the seat to Republicans for the first time since 1997. Following the 2010 United States census, the bounds of the sixth district were changed again as Ohio lost two seats in Congress.

In recent years and like much of coal country, the district has swung decidedly toward the Republican Party at local, state and national levels. After being a dead heat in presidential elections in 2000, 2004 and 2008, it swung hard to Donald Trump in 2016; Trump carried it with 69 percent of the vote over Hillary Clinton, his best showing in the state; the district swung to the right by 30 percent, more than any other in the nation. Trump won it almost as easily over Joe Biden in 2020, with 72 percent of the vote, again his best showing in Ohio.

== Composition ==
For the 118th and successive Congresses (based on redistricting following the 2020 census), the district contains all or portions of the following counties, townships, and municipalities:

Belmont County (16)

All 16 townships and municipalities

Carroll County (21)

All 21 townships and municipalities

Columbiana County (32)

All 32 townships and municipalities

Harrison County (25)

All 25 townships and municipalities

Jefferson County (32)

All 32 townships and municipalities

Mahoning County (28)

All 28 townships and municipalities

Monroe County (28)

All 28 townships and municipalities

Noble County (21)

All 21 townships and municipalities

Stark County (24)

Alliance, Beach City, Bethlehem Township, Brewster, Canton Township (part; also 13th), East Canton, East Sparta, Lexington Township, Louisville, Magnolia (shared with Carroll County), Marlboro Township, Massillon (part; also 13th), Minerva, Navarre, Nimishillen Township, Osnaburg Township, Paris Township, Perry Township (part; also 13th), Pike Township, Sandy Township, Sugar Creek Township, Washington Township, Waynesburg, Wilmot

Tuscarawas County (21)

Barnhill, Bolivar, Dennison, Dover, Fairfield Township, Goshen Township, Lawrence Township, Midvale, Mill Township, Mineral City, New Philadelphia, Parral, Roswell, Sandy Township, Tuscarawas, Uhrichsville, Union Township, Warren Township, Warwick Township, York Township, Zoar

Washington County (29)

All 29 townships and municipalities

== Recent election results from statewide races ==
=== 2023-2027 boundaries ===
Year	Office	Results
2008	President	Obama 53% - 45%
2012	President	Obama 52% - 48%
2016	President	Trump 60% - 36%
2016	Senate	Portman 60% - 35%
2018	Senate	Renacci 51% - 49%
2018	Governor	DeWine 56% - 41%
2018	Secretary of State	LaRose 56% - 41%
2018	Treasurer	Sprague 57% - 43%
2018	Auditor	Faber 53% - 43%
2018	Attorney General	Yost 58% - 42%
2020	President	Trump 64% - 35%
2022	Senate	Vance 62% - 38%
2022	Governor	DeWine 72% - 28%
2022	Secretary of State	LaRose 68% - 31%
2022	Treasurer	Sprague 67% - 33%
2022	Auditor	Faber 67% - 33%
2022	Attorney General	Yost 70% - 30%
2024	President	Trump 66% - 33%
2024	Senate	Moreno 60% - 37%

=== 2027–2033 boundaries ===
Year	Office	Results
2008	President	Obama 52% - 46%
2012	President	Obama 51% - 49%
2016	President	Trump 61% - 35%
2016	Senate	Portman 61% - 33%
2018	Senate	Renacci 52% - 48%
2018	Governor	DeWine 56% - 40%
2018	Attorney General	Yost 58% - 42%
2020	President	Trump 64% - 34%
2022	Senate	Vance 63% - 37%
2022	Governor	DeWine 73% - 27%
2022	Secretary of State	LaRose 69% - 30%
2022	Treasurer	Sprague 68% - 32%
2022	Auditor	Faber 68% - 32%
2022	Attorney General	Yost 70% - 30%
2024	President	Trump 67% - 32%
2024	Senate	Moreno 60% - 36%

== List of members representing the district ==
Member	Party	Year(s)	Cong ress	Electoral history	Counties represented
District established March 4, 1813
Vacant		March 4, 1813 – April 20, 1813	13th	Member-elect John Stark Edwards died before commencement of term.	
Reasin Beall (Wooster)	Democratic-Republican	April 20, 1813 – June 7, 1814	13th	Elected to finish Edwards's term. Resigned.	
Vacant		June 7, 1814 – October 11, 1814	13th		
David Clendenin (Youngstown)	Democratic-Republican	October 11, 1814 – March 3, 1817	13th 14th	Elected to finish Beall's term. Also elected the same day in 1814 to the next term. Lost re-election.	
Peter Hitchcock (Burton)	Democratic-Republican	March 4, 1817 – March 3, 1819	15th	Elected in 1816. Lost re-election.	
John Sloane (Wooster)	Democratic-Republican	March 4, 1819 – March 3, 1823	16th 17th	Elected in 1818. Re-elected in 1820. Redistricted to the 12th district.	
Duncan McArthur (Chillicothe)	Democratic-Republican	March 4, 1823 – March 3, 1825	18th	Elected in 1822. Lost re-election.	
John Thomson (Chillicothe)	Jacksonian	March 4, 1825 – March 3, 1827	19th	Elected in 1824. Lost re-election.	
William Creighton Jr. (Chillicothe)	Anti-Jacksonian	March 4, 1827 – ????, 1828	20th	Elected in 1826. Resigned to when appointed U.S. District Court for the District of Ohio.	
Vacant		????, 1828 – December 19, 1828	20th		
Francis Swaine Muhlenberg (Circleville)	Anti-Jacksonian	December 19, 1828 – March 3, 1829	20th	Elected to finish Creighton's term. Was not elected to the next term.	
William Creighton Jr. (Chillicothe)	Anti-Jacksonian	March 4, 1829 – March 3, 1833	21st 22nd	Elected in 1828. Re-elected in 1830. [data missing]	
Samuel Finley Vinton (Gallipolis)	Anti-Jacksonian	March 4, 1833 – March 3, 1835	23rd 24th	Redistricted from the 7th district and re-elected in 1832. Re-elected in 1834. [data missing]	
Samuel Finley Vinton (Gallipolis)	Whig	March 4, 1835 – March 3, 1837	23rd 24th	Redistricted from the 7th district and re-elected in 1832. Re-elected in 1834. [data missing]	
Calvary Morris (Athens)	Whig	March 4, 1837 – March 3, 1843	25th 26th 27th	Elected in 1836. Re-elected in 1838. Re-elected in 1840. [data missing]	
Henry St. John (McCutchenville)	Democratic	March 4, 1843 – March 3, 1847	28th 29th	Elected in 1843. Re-elected in 1844. [data missing]	
Rodolphus Dickinson (Lower Sandusky)	Democratic	March 4, 1847 – March 20, 1849	30th 31st	Elected in 1846. Re-elected in 1848. Died.	
Vacant		March 20, 1849 – December 3, 1849	31st		
Amos E. Wood (Woodville)	Democratic	December 3, 1849 – November 19, 1850	31st	Elected to finish Dickinson's term. Died.	
Vacant		November 19, 1850 – January 7, 1851	31st		
John Bell (Fremont)	Whig	January 7, 1851 – March 3, 1851	31st	Elected to finish Wood's term. [data missing]	
Frederick W. Green (Tiffin)	Democratic	March 4, 1851 – March 3, 1853	32nd	Elected in 1850. Redistricted to the 9th district.	
Andrew Ellison (Georgetown)	Democratic	March 4, 1853 – March 3, 1855	33rd	Elected in 1852. [data missing]	
Jonas R. Emrie (Hillsboro)	Anti-Nebraska	March 4, 1855 – March 3, 1857	34th	Elected in 1854. [data missing]	
Joseph R. Cockerill (West Union)	Democratic	March 4, 1857 – March 3, 1859	35th	Elected in 1856. [data missing]	
William Howard (Batavia)	Democratic	March 4, 1859 – March 3, 1861	36th	Elected in 1858. [data missing]	
Chilton A. White (Georgetown)	Democratic	March 4, 1861 – March 3, 1865	37th 38th	Elected in 1860. Re-elected in 1862. [data missing]	
Reader W. Clarke (Batavia)	Republican	March 4, 1865 – March 3, 1869	39th 40th	Elected in 1864. Re-elected in 1866. [data missing]	
John Armstrong Smith (Hillsboro)	Republican	March 4, 1869 – March 3, 1873	41st 42nd	Elected in 1868. Re-elected in 1870. [data missing]	
Isaac R. Sherwood (Bryan)	Republican	March 4, 1873 – March 3, 1875	43rd	Elected in 1872. [data missing]	
Frank H. Hurd (Toledo)	Democratic	March 4, 1875 – March 3, 1877	44th	Elected in 1874. [data missing]	
Jacob D. Cox (Toledo)	Republican	March 4, 1877 – March 3, 1879	45th	Elected in 1876. [data missing]	
William D. Hill (Defiance)	Democratic	March 4, 1879 – March 3, 1881	46th	Elected in 1878. [data missing]	
James M. Ritchie (Toledo)	Republican	March 3, 1881 – March 3, 1883	47th	Elected in 1880. [data missing]	
William D. Hill (Defiance)	Democratic	March 4, 1883 – March 3, 1887	48th 49th	Elected in 1882. Re-elected in 1884. [data missing]	
Melvin M. Boothman (Bryan)	Republican	March 4, 1887 – March 3, 1891	50th 51st	Elected in 1886. Re-elected in 1888. [data missing]	
Dennis D. Donovan (Deshler)	Democratic	March 4, 1891 – March 3, 1893	52nd	Elected in 1890. Redistricted to the 5th district.	
George W. Hulick (Batavia)	Republican	March 4, 1893 – March 3, 1897	53rd 54th	Elected in 1892. Re-elected in 1894. [data missing]	
Seth W. Brown (Lebanon)	Republican	March 4, 1897 – March 3, 1901	55th 56th	Elected in 1896. Re-elected in 1898. [data missing]	
Charles Q. Hildebrant (Wilmington)	Republican	March 4, 1901 – March 3, 1905	57th 58th	Elected in 1900. Re-elected in 1902. [data missing]	
Thomas E. Scroggy (Xenia)	Republican	March 4, 1905 – March 3, 1907	59th	Elected in 1904. [data missing]	
Matthew Denver (Wilmington)	Democratic	March 4, 1907 – March 3, 1913	60th 61st 62nd	Elected in 1906. Re-elected in 1908. Re-elected in 1910. [data missing]	
Simeon D. Fess (Yellow Springs)	Republican	March 4, 1913 – March 3, 1915	63rd	Elected in 1912. Redistricted to the 7th district.	
Charles Cyrus Kearns (Amelia)	Republican	March 4, 1915 – March 3, 1931	64th 65th 66th 67th 68th 69th 70th 71st	Elected in 1914. Re-elected in 1916. Re-elected in 1918. Re-elected in 1920. Re-elected in 1922. Re-elected in 1924. Re-elected in 1926. Re-elected in 1928. Lost re-election.	
James G. Polk (Highland)	Democratic	March 3, 1931 – January 3, 1941	72nd 73rd 74th 75th 76th	Elected in 1930. Re-elected in 1932. Re-elected in 1934. Re-elected in 1936. Re-elected in 1938. Retired.	
Jacob E. Davis (Waverly)	Democratic	January 3, 1941 – January 3, 1943	77th	Elected in 1940. Lost re-election.	
Edward Oscar McCowen (Wheelersburg)	Republican	January 3, 1943 – January 3, 1949	78th 79th 80th	Elected in 1942. Re-elected in 1944. Re-elected in 1946. Lost re-election.	
James G. Polk (Highland)	Democratic	January 3, 1949 – April 28, 1959	81st 82nd 83rd 84th 85th 86th	Elected in 1948. Re-elected in 1950. Re-elected in 1952. Re-elected in 1954. Re-elected in 1956. Re-elected in 1958. Died.	
Vacant		April 28, 1959 – November 8, 1960	86th		
Ward Miller (Portsmouth)	Republican	November 8, 1960 – January 3, 1961	86th	Elected to finish Polk's term. Was not a candidate for the next term.	
Bill Harsha (Portsmouth)	Republican	January 3, 1961 – January 3, 1981	87th 88th 89th 90th 91st 92nd 93rd 94th 95th 96th	Elected in 1960. Re-elected in 1962. Re-elected in 1964. Re-elected in 1966. Re-elected in 1968. Re-elected in 1970. Re-elected in 1972. Re-elected in 1974. Re-elected in 1976. Re-elected in 1978. Retired.	
Bob McEwen (Hillsboro)	Republican	January 3, 1981 – January 3, 1993	97th 98th 99th 100th 101st 102nd	Elected in 1980. Re-elected in 1982. Re-elected in 1984. Re-elected in 1986. Re-elected in 1988. Re-elected in 1990. Lost re-election.	
Ted Strickland (Lucasville)	Democratic	January 3, 1993 – January 3, 1995	103rd	Elected in 1992. Lost re-election.	
Frank Cremeans (Gallipolis)	Republican	January 3, 1995 – January 3, 1997	104th	Elected in 1994. Lost re-election.	
Ted Strickland (Lisbon)	Democratic	January 3, 1997 – January 3, 2007	105th 106th 107th 108th 109th	Elected in 1996. Re-elected in 1998. Re-elected in 2000. Re-elected in 2002. Re-elected in 2004. Retired to become Governor of Ohio.	
Ted Strickland (Lisbon)	Democratic	January 3, 1997 – January 3, 2007	105th 106th 107th 108th 109th	Elected in 1996. Re-elected in 1998. Re-elected in 2000. Re-elected in 2002. Re-elected in 2004. Retired to become Governor of Ohio.	2003–2013
Charlie Wilson (St. Clairsville)	Democratic	January 3, 2007 – January 3, 2011	110th 111th	Elected in 2006. Re-elected in 2008. Lost re-election.	2003–2013
Bill Johnson (Marietta)	Republican	January 3, 2011 – January 21, 2024	112th 113th 114th 115th 116th 117th 118th 119th	Elected in 2010. Re-elected in 2012. Re-elected in 2014. Re-elected in 2016. Re-elected in 2018. Re-elected in 2020. Re-elected in 2022. Resigned to become president of Youngstown State University.	2003–2013
Bill Johnson (Marietta)	Republican	January 3, 2011 – January 21, 2024	112th 113th 114th 115th 116th 117th 118th 119th	Elected in 2010. Re-elected in 2012. Re-elected in 2014. Re-elected in 2016. Re-elected in 2018. Re-elected in 2020. Re-elected in 2022. Resigned to become president of Youngstown State University.	2013–2023
Bill Johnson (Marietta)	Republican	January 3, 2011 – January 21, 2024	112th 113th 114th 115th 116th 117th 118th 119th	Elected in 2010. Re-elected in 2012. Re-elected in 2014. Re-elected in 2016. Re-elected in 2018. Re-elected in 2020. Re-elected in 2022. Resigned to become president of Youngstown State University.	2023–2027
Vacant		January 21, 2024 – June 25, 2024	118th		2023–2027
Michael Rulli (Salem)	Republican	June 25, 2024 – present	118th 119th	Elected to finish Johnson's term. Re-elected in 2024. Re-elected in 2026.	2023–2027

== Recent election results ==
The following chart shows historic election results.

Year	Democratic	Republican	Other
1920	Cleona Searles: 30,903	√ Charles C. Kearns (Incumbent): 38,044	—
1922	William N. Gableman: 28,939	√ Charles C. Kearns (Incumbent): 32,416	—
1924	Edward N. Kennedy: (Note: Probable error in records: Edward H. Kennedy, the Democratic nominee in 1926, and Edward N. Kennedy, the Democratic nominee in 1924, are most probably the same person. Which name is correct is unknown.) 29,283	√ Charles C. Kearns (Incumbent): 33,064	—
1926	Edward H. Kennedy: 24,730	√ Charles C. Kearns (Incumbent): 27,688	—
1928	George D. Nye: 33,020	√ Charles C. Kearns (Incumbent): 43,519	—
1930	√ James G. Polk: 37,158	Charles C. Kearns (Incumbent): 33,300	—
1932	√ James G. Polk (Incumbent): 50,913	Mack Sauer: 39,668	—
1934	√ James G. Polk (Incumbent): 42,340	Albert L. Daniels: 38,538	Mark A. Crawford: 312
1936	√ James G. Polk (Incumbent): 54,904	Emory F. Smith: 45,733	—
1938	√ James G. Polk (Incumbent): 43,646	Emory F. Smith: 42,847	—
1940	√ Jacob E. Davis: 52,769	Chester P. Fitch: 48,257	—
1942	Jacob E. Davis (Incumbent): 31,793	√ Edward O. McCowen: 33,171	—
1944	John W. Bush: 42,167	√ Edward O. McCowen (Incumbent): 45,284	—
1946	Franklin E. Smith: 33,013	√ Edward O. McCowen (Incumbent): 39,992	—
1948	√ James G. Polk: 46,944	Edward O. McCowen (Incumbent): 41,402	—
1950	√ James G. Polk (Incumbent): 40,335	Edward O. McCowen: 38,996	—
1952	√ James G. Polk (Incumbent): 67,220	Leo Blackburn: 66,896	—
1954	√ James G. Polk (Incumbent): 54,044	Leo Blackburn: 49,531	—
1956	√ James G. Polk (Incumbent): 72,229	Albert L. Daniels: 60,300	—
1958	√ James G. Polk (Incumbent): 76,566	Elmer S. Barrett: 46,924	—
1960	Franklin E. Smith: 65,045	√ Bill Harsha: 80,124	—
1960 s (Note: A separate, special election was held to fill out Polk's unexpired term. Miller, the winner of this election, served the remainder of 1960, until Harsha's term began in 1961.)	Gladys E. Davis: 61,713	√ Ward Miller: 76,520	—
1962	Jerry C. Rasor: 47,737	√ Bill Harsha (Incumbent): 72,743	—
1964	Franklin E. Smith: 57,223	√ Bill Harsha (Incumbent): 86,015	—
1966	Ottie W. Reno: 35,345	√ Bill Harsha (Incumbent): 74,847	—
1968	Kenneth L. Kirby: 40,964	√ Bill Harsha (Incumbent): 107,289	—
1970	Raymond H. Stevens: 39,265	√ Bill Harsha (Incumbent): 82,772	—
1972	—	√ Bill Harsha (Incumbent): 128,394	—
1974	Lloyd Allan Wood: 42,316	√ Bill Harsha (Incumbent): 93,400	—
1976	Ted Strickland: 67,067	√ Bill Harsha (Incumbent): 107,064	—
1978	Ted Strickland: 46,313	√ Bill Harsha (Incumbent): 85,592	—
1980	Ted Strickland: 84,235	√ Bob McEwen: 101,288	—
1982	Lynn Alan Grimshaw: 63,435	√ Bob McEwen (Incumbent): 92,135	—
1984	Bob Smith: 52,727	√ Bob McEwen (Incumbent): 150,101	—
1986	Gordon R. Roberts: 42,155	√ Bob McEwen (Incumbent): 106,354	Amos Seeley: 2,829
1988	Gordon R. Roberts: 52,635	√ Bob McEwen (Incumbent): 152,235	—
1990	Ray Mitchell: 47,415	√ Bob McEwen (Incumbent): 117,220	—
1992	√ Ted Strickland: 122,720	Bob McEwen (Incumbent): (Note: Redistricting following the 1990 census resulted in putting two Republican incumbents, Bob McEwen and Clarence E. Miller (incumbent in the 10th District), in the new Sixth District. McEwen defeated Miller in a bitterly fought Republican primary election in 1992.) 119,252	—
1994	Ted Strickland (Incumbent): 87,861	√ Frank Cremeans: 91,263	—
1996	√ Ted Strickland: 118,003	Frank Cremeans (Incumbent): 111,907	—
1998	√ Ted Strickland (Incumbent): 102,852	Nancy P. Hollister: 77,711	—
2000	√ Ted Strickland (Incumbent): 138,849	Mike Azinger: 96,966	Kenneth R. MacCutcheon (L): 4,759
2002	√ Ted Strickland (Incumbent): 113,972	Mike Halleck: 77,643	—
2004	√ Ted Strickland (Incumbent): 223,884	None	John Stephen Luchansky (Write-in): 145
2006	√ Charles A. Wilson Jr.: 131,322	Chuck Blasdel: 80,705	—
2008	√ Charles A. Wilson Jr. (Incumbent): 176,330	Richard Stobbs: 92,968	Dennis Spisak (G): 13,812
2010	Charles A. Wilson Jr. (Incumbent): 91,039	√ Bill Johnson: 101,580	Richard Cadle (C): 4,963; Martin Elass (L): 4,424
2012	Charles A. Wilson Jr.: 144,444	√ Bill Johnson (Incumbent): 164,536	
2014	Jennifer Garrison: 73,561	√ Bill Johnson (Incumbent): 111,026	Dennis Lambert (G): 6,065
2016	Michael L. Lorentz: 88,780	√ Bill Johnson (Incumbent): 213,975	
2018	Shawna Roberts: 76,716	√ Bill Johnson (Incumbent): 172,774	—
2020	Shawna Roberts: 85,661	√ Bill Johnson (Incumbent): 249,130	
2022	Louis Lyras: 90,500	√ Bill Johnson (Incumbent): 189,883	
2024 s	Michael Kripchak: 27,062	√ Michael Rulli: 32,627	

== See also ==
- Ohio's congressional districts
- List of United States congressional districts

== Sources ==
- Martis, Kenneth C. (1989). The Historical Atlas of Political Parties in the United States Congress. New York: Macmillan Publishing Company.
- Martis, Kenneth C. (1982). The Historical Atlas of United States Congressional Districts. New York: Macmillan Publishing Company.
- Congressional Biographical Directory of the United States 1774–present
