= Jacob Davis =

Jacob Davis may refer to:

- Jacob C. Davis (1820–1883), American politician (Illinois) and criminal defendant
- Jacob E. Davis (1905–2003), American politician (Ohio)
- Jacob W. Davis (1831–1908), Latvian-American entrepreneur
- Jacob Davis Babcock Stillman
- Jacob Davis (pole vaulter), winner of the 1999 NCAA DI outdoor pole vault championship
- Jacob Davis (singer), American country music singer

== See also ==
- Jake Davis (disambiguation)
