= Melvin M. Boothman =

American politician (1846–1904)

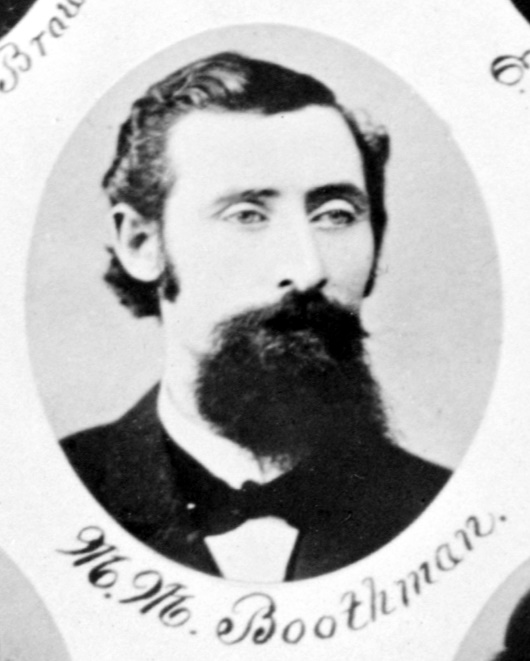

Member of the U.S. House of Representatives from Ohio's 6th district
- In office March 4, 1887 – March 3, 1891
- Preceded by: William D. Hill
- Succeeded by: Dennis D. Donovan

Personal details
- Born: Melvin Morella Boothman; October 16, 1846 Bryan, Ohio, U.S.
- Died: March 5, 1904 (aged 57) Bryan, Ohio, U.S.
- Resting place: Fountain City Cemetery
- Party: Republican
- Education: University of Michigan Law School

Military service
- Allegiance: United States
- Branch/service: Union Army
- Unit: 38th Ohio Infantry
- Battles/wars: American Civil War

Melvin Morella Boothman (October 16, 1846 – March 5, 1904) was an American Civil War veteran and politician who served three terms as a U.S. representative from Ohio.

== Biography ==
Born near Bryan, Ohio, Boothman attended the public schools. He engaged in agricultural pursuits. Enlisted in Company H, Thirty-eighth Regiment, Ohio Volunteer Infantry, January 4, 1864. He served through the Atlanta campaign. He was graduated from the law department of the University of Michigan at Ann Arbor in 1871. He was admitted to the bar and commenced practice in Bryan, Ohio.

=== Political career ===
Boothman was elected treasurer of Williams County in 1871 and reelected in 1873.

Boothman was elected as a Republican to the Fiftieth and Fifty-first Congresses (March 4, 1887 – March 3, 1891). He was not a candidate for renomination in 1890.

=== Later career and death ===
He resumed the practice of law in Bryan, Ohio, and died there March 5, 1904. He was interred in Fountain City Cemetery.

== Sources ==
- United States Congress. "Melvin M. Boothman (id: B000632)". Biographical Directory of the United States Congress.

U.S. House of Representatives
Preceded by William D. Hill	Member of the U.S. House of Representatives from Ohio's 6th congressional district 1887–1891	Succeeded by George W. Hulick
