= Dennis D. Donovan =

American politician (1859–1941)

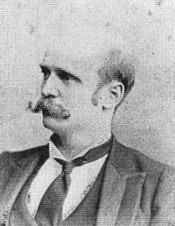

Member of the U.S. House of Representatives from Ohio
- In office March 4, 1891 – March 3, 1895
- Preceded by: Melvin M. Boothman
- Succeeded by: Francis B. De Witt
- Constituency: 6th district (1891-1893); 5th district (1893-1895)

Member of the Ohio House of Representatives from the Henry County district
- In office January 2, 1888 – March 3, 1891
- Preceded by: John Cuff
- Succeeded by: Jacob F. Myers

Personal details
- Born: January 31, 1859 Texas, Ohio, U.S.
- Died: April 21, 1941 (aged 82) Napoleon, Ohio, U.S.
- Resting place: St. Augustine Cemetery, Napoleon
- Party: Democratic
- Spouse: Ginevra Waltimire (1863-1974)
- Education: Valparaiso University School of Law; Georgetown University Law Center

Dennis D. Donovan (January 31, 1859 – April 21, 1941) was a 19th-century American lawyer, educator, businessman, and politician who was a U.S. representative from Ohio for two terms, from 1891 to 1895.

== Biography ==
Born near Texas, Ohio, Donovan attended the common schools, and Northern Indiana Normal School, Valparaiso, Indiana. He taught school. He engaged in the mercantile and timber business. He studied law at Valparaiso University School of Law. He was graduated from the law department of Georgetown University, Washington, D.C., in 1895. He was admitted to the bar the same year and commenced practice in Deshler, Ohio.

=== Early political career ===
He was appointed postmaster of Deshler by President Cleveland on July 21, 1885, and served until January 27, 1888. He was mayor of Deshler for two terms. He served as member of the State house of representatives in 1887 and 1889.

=== Congress ===
Donovan was elected as a Democrat to the Fifty-second and Fifty-third Congresses (March 4, 1891 – March 3, 1895). He was an unsuccessful candidate for renomination in 1894 to the Fifty-fourth Congress.

=== Later career ===
He resumed the practice of law in Deshler, Ohio. He moved to Napoleon, Ohio, in 1897 and continued the practice of law.

He was an unsuccessful candidate for nomination as Governor of Ohio in 1898.

=== Death and burial ===
He died in Napoleon, Ohio, on April 21, 1941. He was interred in St. Augustine Cemetery.

=== Family ===
He married Ginevra Waltimire of Deshler, Ohio in 1891. He was a member of B.P.O.E. and Knights of Columbus.

Ginevra outlived him, dying on July 1, 1974, aged 110.

== Sources ==
- United States Congress. "Dennis D. Donovan (id: D000420)". Biographical Directory of the United States Congress.

U.S. House of Representatives
Preceded by Melvin M. Boothman	Member of the U.S. House of Representatives from Ohio's 6th congressional district 1891-1893	Succeeded by George W. Hulick
Preceded by Fernando C. Layton	Member of the U.S. House of Representatives from Ohio's 5th congressional district 1893-1895	Succeeded by Francis B. De Witt
