= Jake Davis =

Jake Davis may refer to:

- Topiary (hacktivist) (Jake Leslie Davis, born 1992), British hacktivist
- Jake Davis (soccer) (born 2002), American soccer player
- Jake "Shake" Davis (died 1922), African-American man lynched in Miller County, Georgia, USA, see Lynching of Jake Davis

== See also ==
- Jacob Davis (disambiguation)
