= John Armstrong Smith =

American politician

Member of the U.S. House of Representatives from Ohio's 6th district
- In office March 4, 1869 – March 3, 1873
- Preceded by: Reader W. Clarke
- Succeeded by: Isaac R. Sherwood

Member of the Ohio House of Representatives from the Highland County district
- In office December 6, 1841 – December 3, 1843 Serving with Abraham Lowman, Robert Robinson
- Preceded by: James Carothers, James Smith
- Succeeded by: Hugh Means, Burnham Martin

Personal details
- Born: September 23, 1814 Hillsboro, Ohio, U.S.
- Died: March 7, 1892 (aged 77) Hillsboro, Ohio, U.S.
- Party: Republican
- Education: Miami University

John Armstrong Smith (September 23, 1814 – March 7, 1892) was an American lawyer and politician who served two terms as a U.S. representative from Ohio from 1869 to 1873.

== Biography ==
Born in Hillsboro, Ohio, Smith pursued classical studies and was graduated from Miami University, Oxford, Ohio, in 1834. He studied law. He was admitted to the bar in 1835 and commenced practice in Hillsboro, Ohio. He served in the State house of representatives in 1841. He served as member of the State constitutional convention of Ohio in 1850.

=== Congress ===
Smith was elected as a Republican to the Forty-first and Forty-second Congresses (March 4, 1869 – March 3, 1873).

=== Later career and death ===
He resumed the practice of law. He served as member of the State constitutional convention of 1873.

He died in Hillsboro, Ohio, March 7, 1892. He was interred in Hillsboro Cemetery.

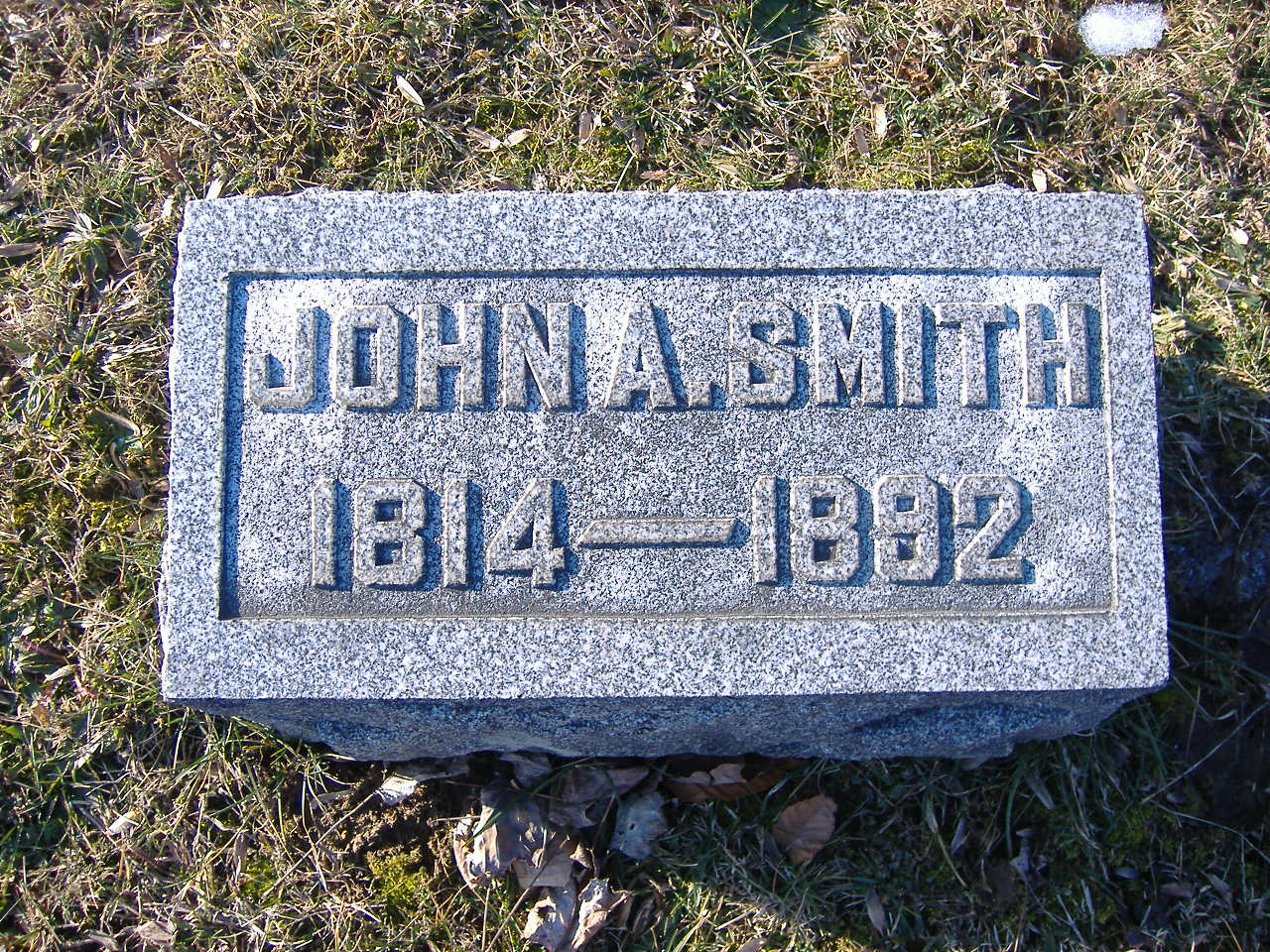
Gravestone of John Armstrong Smith located at Hillsboro Cemetery in Hillsboro, Ohio.

== Sources ==
- United States Congress. "John Armstrong Smith (id: S000569)". Biographical Directory of the United States Congress.

U.S. House of Representatives
Preceded by Reader W. Clarke	Member of the U.S. House of Representatives from Ohio's 6th congressional district 1869–1873	Succeeded by Isaac R. Sherwood
