= Ward Miller =

American politician (1902–1984)

Ward MacLaughlin Miller
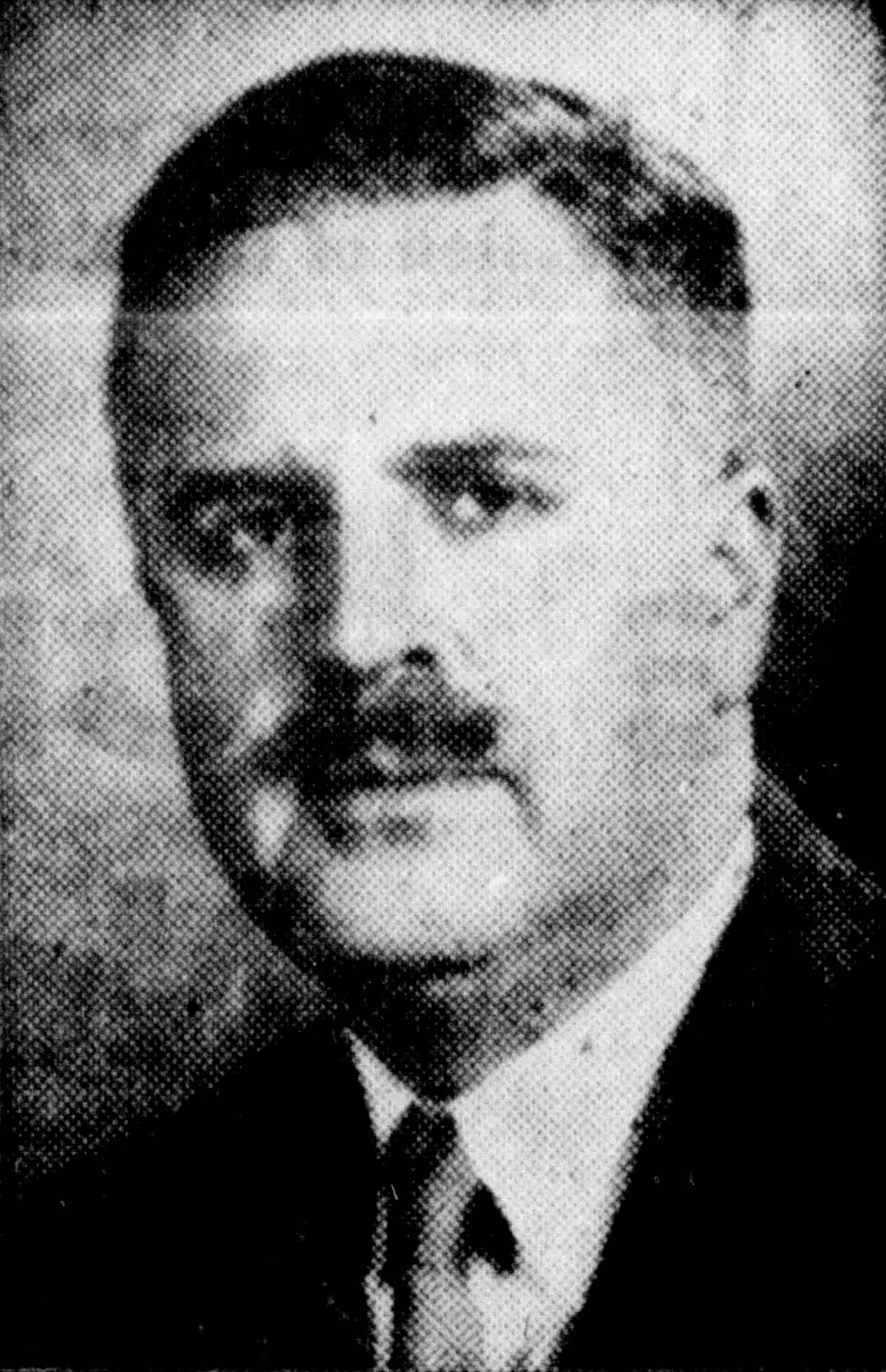
- Miller c. 1960

Member of the U.S. House of Representatives from Ohio's 6th district
- In office November 8, 1960 – January 3, 1961
- Preceded by: James G. Polk
- Succeeded by: Bill Harsha

Personal details
- Born: November 29, 1902 Portsmouth, Ohio, U.S.
- Died: March 11, 1984 (aged 81) Portsmouth, Ohio, U.S.
- Party: Republican
- Education: Ohio State University (BA); Harvard University (MA)

Ward MacLaughlin Miller (November 29, 1902 – March 11, 1984) was an American politician of the Republican Party. He briefly served in the U.S. House of Representatives from November 1960 to January 1961.

== Biography ==
Miller was born in Portsmouth, Ohio in 1901. He earned his high school diploma from Portsmouth High School. In 1923, he earned a bachelor of arts degree from Ohio State University (Columbus, Ohio). In 1931, he was awarded a master of arts degree by Harvard University (Cambridge, Massachusetts).

=== Congress ===
On November 8, 1960, Miller won a special election to complete the term of Democratic U.S. Representative James G. Polk, who had died in office on April 28, 1959 (thus creating one of the longest vacancies in the U.S. Congress in modern times). Since Miller had not run for election to a full term in the 87th Congress, his membership in the House of Representatives ended on January 3, 1961.

=== Death ===
He died in Portsmouth in 1984.

== See also ==
- Ohio's 6th congressional district
- List of United States representatives from Ohio
- United States Congress. "Ward Miller (id: M000759)". Biographical Directory of the United States Congress.

U.S. House of Representatives
| Preceded by James G. Polk | Member of the U.S. House of Representatives from Ohio's 6th congressional district November 8, 1960 – January 3, 1961 | Succeeded by Bill Harsha |
