= Joseph R. Cockerill =

American politician

Joseph Randolph Cockerill
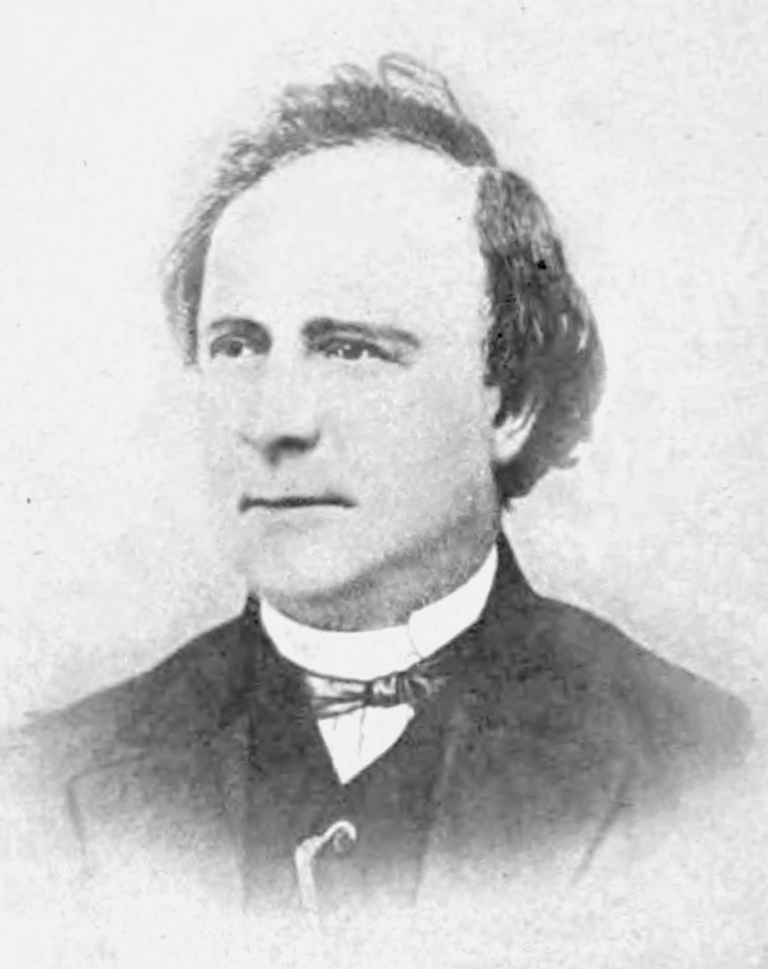

Member of the U.S. House of Representatives from Ohio's 6th district
- In office March 4, 1857 – March 4, 1859
- Preceded by: Jonas R. Emrie
- Succeeded by: William Howard

Member of the Ohio House of Representatives from the Adams County district
- In office January 5, 1852 – January 1, 1854
- Preceded by: John M. Smith
- Succeeded by: Jesse Ellis
- In office January 6, 1868 – December 31, 1871
- Preceded by: W. D. Burdage
- Succeeded by: Jesse Ellis

Personal details
- Born: January 2, 1818 Loudoun County, Virginia
- Died: October 23, 1875 (aged 57) West Union, Ohio
- Party: Democratic

Joseph Randolph Cockerill (January 2, 1818 – October 23, 1875) was an American lawyer and politician who was a U.S. representative from Ohio for one term from 1857 to 1859.

== Early life ==
Joseph R. Cockerill was born in Loudoun County, Virginia, January 2, 1818. He attended the public schools. Cockerill moved to Scott Township, Adams County, Ohio, in 1837 and settled in Youngsville. He taught school. He became County surveyor in 1840. He studied law, was admitted to the bar in 1851 and began the practice of law in West Union, Ohio. He served as clerk of the court of common pleas.

== Congress ==
He served as member of the State house of representatives in 1853 and 1854. Cockerill was elected as a Democrat to the Thirty-fifth Congress (March 4, 1857 – March 4, 1859). He was a delegate to the Charleston Convention.

== American Civil War service ==
Cockerill entered the Union Army during the American Civil War and served as colonel of the 70th Ohio Infantry, December 20, 1861. Except for the periods between August 21, 1863, and September 19, 1863, and January 28, 1864, and March 11, 1864, he exercised brigade command in the Army of the Tennessee from October 26, 1862, to April 13, 1864. He resigned his commission on April 13, 1864.

On March 18, 1867, President Andrew Johnson nominated Cockerill for appointment to the grade of brevet brigadier general of volunteers to rank from March 13, 1865, and the United States Senate confirmed the appointment on March 28, 1867.

== Later life ==
After the Civil War, Joseph Cockerill was again a member of the Ohio house of representatives, serving from 1868 to 1871. He lost election for Ohio State Auditor in 1871.

=== Death and burial ===
Joseph R. Cockerill died in West Union, Ohio, October 23, 1875. He was interred in Old West Union Cemetery, West Union.

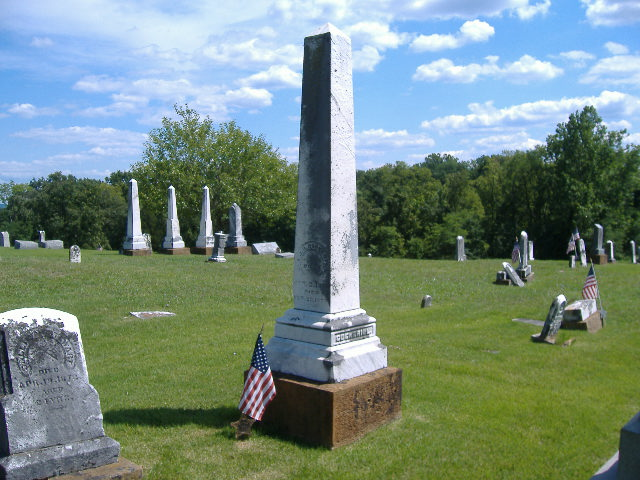
Gravestone of Joseph Cockerill

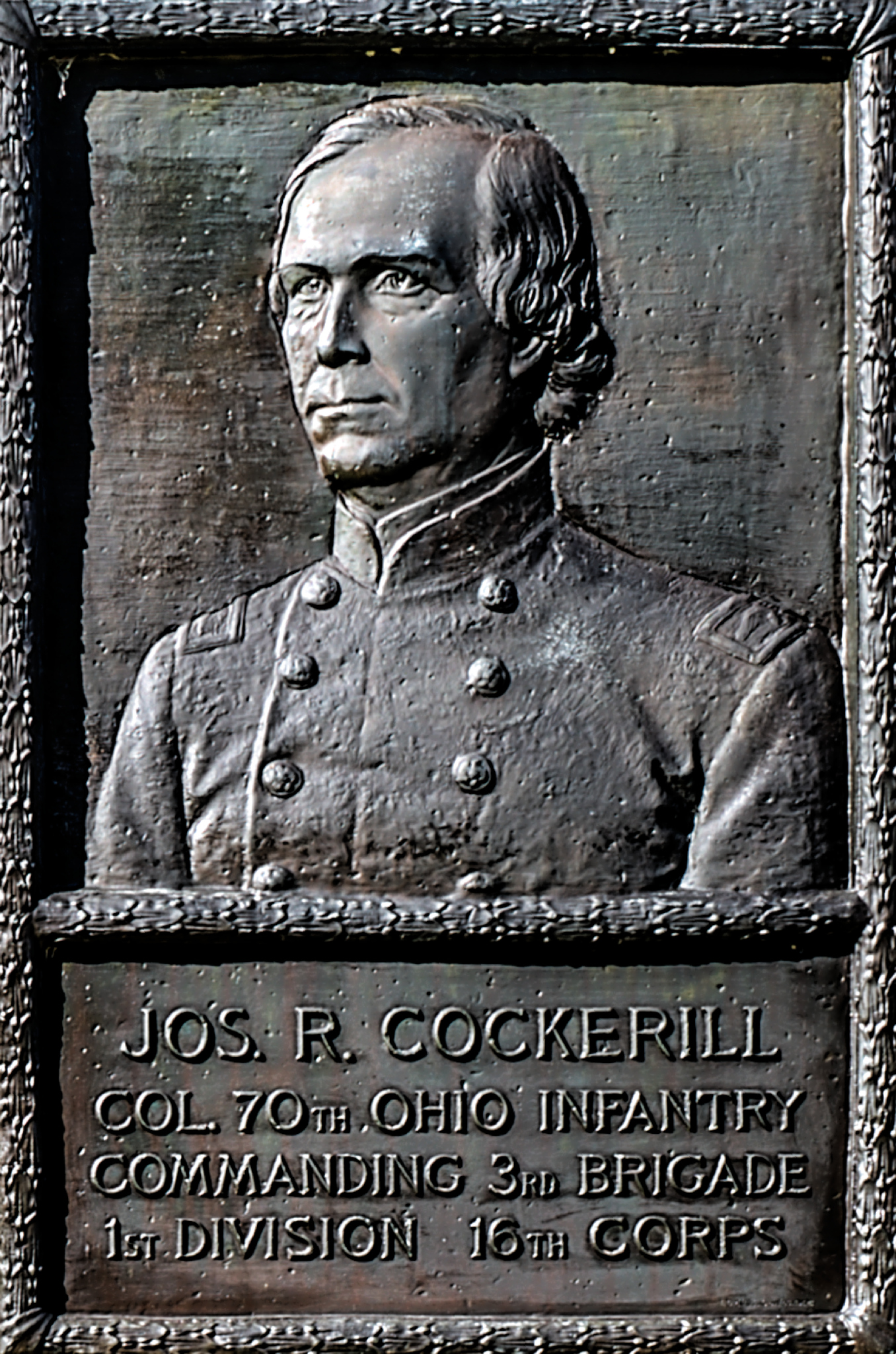
Bronze relief portrait of Cockerill by T.A.R. Kitson, Vicksburg National Military Park

== Notes ==
U.S. House of Representatives
Preceded by Jonas R. Emrie	Member of the U.S. House of Representatives from Ohio's 6th congressional district 1857–1859	Succeeded by William Howard
