= William D. Hill =

American politician (1833–1906)

William David Hill
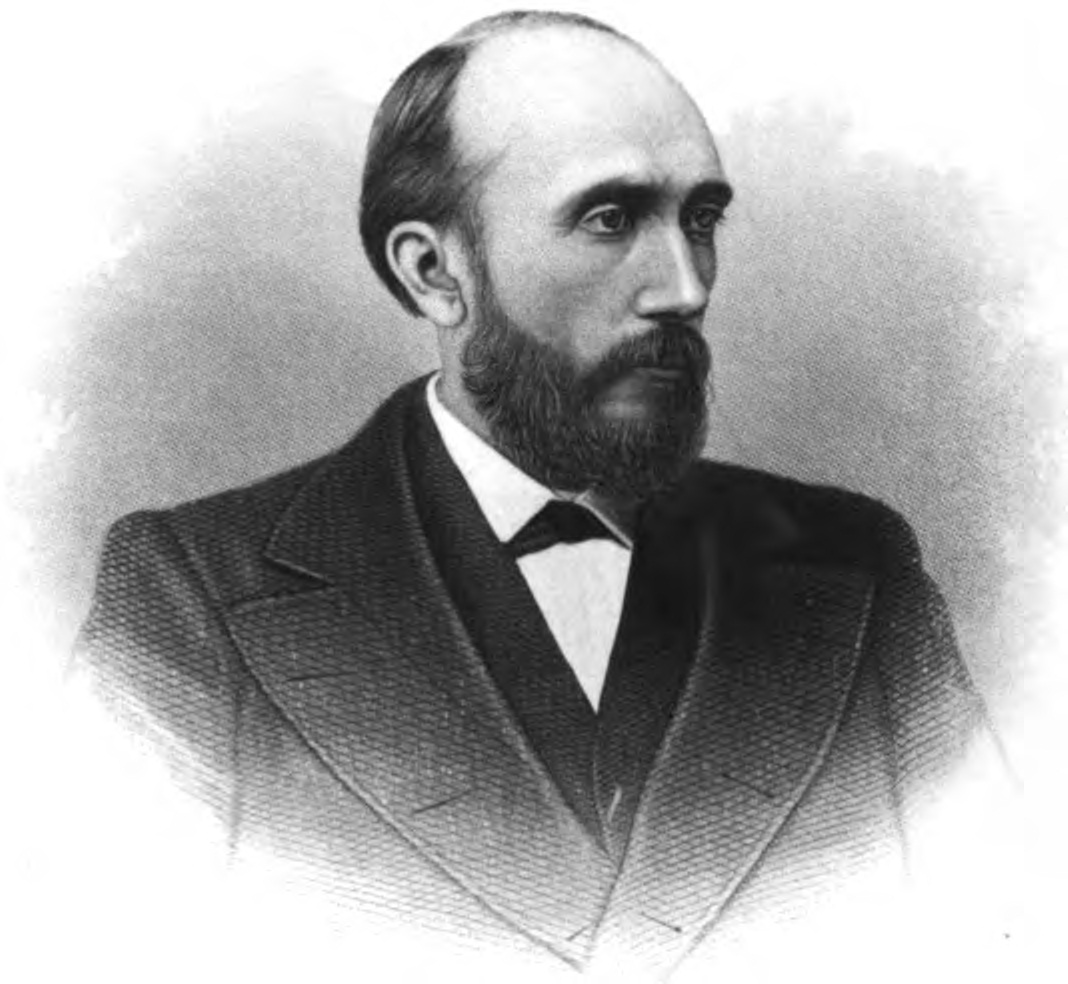
- circa 1897

Member of the U.S. House of Representatives from Ohio's 6th district
- In office March 4, 1879 – March 3, 1881
- Preceded by: Jacob Dolson Cox
- Succeeded by: James M. Ritchie
- In office March 4, 1883 – March 3, 1887
- Preceded by: James M. Ritchie
- Succeeded by: Melvin M. Boothman

Member of the Ohio House of Representatives from the Paulding County district
- In office January 1, 1866 – January 2, 1870 Serving with E. G. Denman
- Preceded by: John W. Ayres
- Succeeded by: Levi Colby

Personal details
- Born: October 1, 1833 Nelson County, Virginia, U.S.
- Died: December 26, 1906 (aged 73) Litchfield, Illinois, U.S.
- Resting place: Riverside Cemetery, Defiance, Ohio
- Party: Democratic
- Spouse: Augusta B. March
- Children: four daughters
- Education: Antioch College
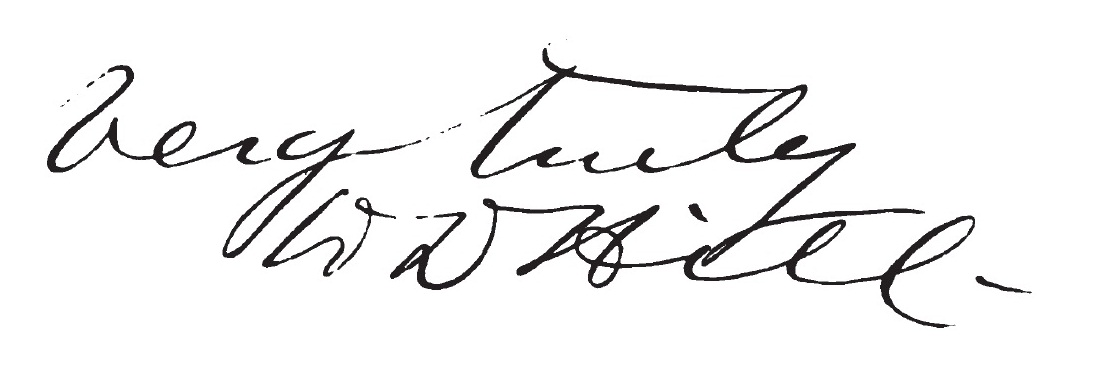
- Signature

William David Hill (October 1, 1833 – December 26, 1906) was a U.S. representative from Ohio.

== Early life and career ==
Born in Nelson County, Virginia, Hill attended the country schools and Antioch College. He moved to Springfield, Ohio, and published the Ohio Press in 1858. He studied law. He was admitted to the bar in 1859 and commenced practice in Springfield, Ohio. He served as mayor of Springfield 1861-1863. He served as member of the State house of representatives 1866-1870. He served as member of the Board of Education of Defiance, Ohio. Superintendent of insurance 1875-1878. He served as delegate to the Democratic National Convention in 1880 and 1888.

== Congress ==
Hill was elected as a Democrat to the Forty-sixth Congress (March 4, 1879 – March 3, 1881).

Hill was elected to the Forty-eighth and Forty-ninth Congresses (March 4, 1883 – March 3, 1887). He served as chairman of the Committee on Territories (Forty-ninth Congress). He was an unsuccessful candidate for reelection in 1886 to the Fiftieth Congress.

== Later career and death ==
He resumed the practice of law in Defiance, Ohio. He moved to Kalispell, Montana, in 1891. He returned to Defiance in 1896 and continued the practice of law. City solicitor of Defiance 1903-1905.

=== Death ===
He died near Litchfield, Illinois, while en route to Los Angeles, California, December 26, 1906. He was interred in Riverside Cemetery, Defiance, Ohio.

Hill was married June 3, 1862, to Augusta B. March, and had four daughters.

== Sources ==
- United States Congress. "William D. Hill (id: H000609)". Biographical Directory of the United States Congress.

U.S. House of Representatives
Preceded by Jacob D. Cox	Member of the U.S. House of Representatives from Ohio's 6th congressional district 1879–1881	Succeeded by James M. Ritchie
Preceded by James M. Ritchie	Member of the U.S. House of Representatives from Ohio's 6th congressional district 1883–1887	Succeeded by Melvin M. Boothman
