= William Howard (Ohio politician) =

American politician

Member of the U.S. House of Representatives from Ohio's 6th district
- In office March 4, 1859 – March 3, 1861
- Preceded by: Joseph R. Cockerill
- Succeeded by: Chilton A. White

Member of the Ohio Senate from Brown & Clermont counties
- In office December 3, 1849 – January 4, 1852
- Preceded by: Benjamin Evans
- Succeeded by: Sanders W. Johnson

Personal details
- Born: December 31, 1817 Jefferson County, Virginia, US
- Died: June 1, 1891 (aged 73) Batavia, Ohio, US
- Resting place: Batavia Union Cemetery
- Party: Democratic

Military service
- Allegiance: United States
- Branch/service: United States Army
- Rank: Lieutenant colonel
- Battles/wars: Mexican–American War; American Civil War

William Howard (December 31, 1817 – June 1, 1891) was a United States Army soldier, lawyer, and a U.S. representative from Ohio for one term from 1859 to 1861.

== Biography ==
Born in Jefferson County, Virginia, Howard attended public schools and later studied law. He was admitted to the bar in 1840 and subsequently established a law practice. He later moved to Batavia, Ohio, and served as a prosecuting attorney from 1845 to 1849.

He served in the Mexican–American War and was made second lieutenant of Company C, 2nd Ohio Infantry.

Following the Mexican-American War, Howard served as a member of the Ohio Senate from 1849 to 1852.

Howard was elected as a Democrat to the Thirty-sixth (March 4, 1859 – March 3, 1861). He was not a candidate for re-election.

He enrolled in the army following the outbreak of the American Civil War and was commissioned as the major of the 59th Ohio Infantry, on August 11, 1861. He was promoted to lieutenant colonel and commanded the regiment at the Battle of Stones River. Howard resigned his commission on February 24, 1863, and returned home to resume his law practice.

Howard practiced law until his death in Batavia, Ohio on June 1, 1891, at the age of 73. He was interred in the Batavia Union Cemetery.

U.S. House of Representatives
Preceded by Joseph R. Cockerill	Member of the U.S. House of Representatives from Ohio's 6th congressional district March 4, 1859 – March 3, 1861	Succeeded by Chilton A. White
Ohio Senate
Preceded by Benjamin Evans	Senator from Brown & Clermont counties December 3, 1849-January 4, 1852	Succeeded by Sanders W. Johnson
