= Edward Oscar McCowen =

American politician

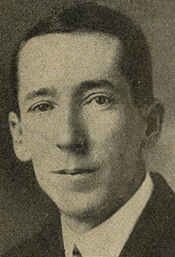

Member of the U.S. House of Representatives from Ohio's 6th district
- In office January 3, 1943 – January 3, 1949
- Preceded by: Jacob E. Davis
- Succeeded by: James G. Polk

Personal details
- Born: June 29, 1877 Bloom Township, Scioto County, Ohio, U.S.
- Died: November 4, 1953 (aged 76) Wheelersburg, Ohio, U.S.
- Resting place: South Webster Cemetery
- Party: Republican
- Education: Ohio Northern University; Ohio State University; University of Cincinnati

Edward Oscar McCowen (June 29, 1877 – November 4, 1953) was a three-term Republican member of the U.S. House of Representatives from Ohio from 1943 to 1949.

== Biography ==
Edward O. McCowen was born in Bloom Township, Ohio. He attended the public schools of South Webster, Ohio, and graduated from Ohio Northern University at Ada, Ohio, in 1908, Ohio State University at Columbus, Ohio, in 1917, and from the Graduate School of the University of Cincinnati in Cincinnati, Ohio, in 1939. He was successively a high-school teacher, principal, and superintendent. He was the superintendent of the Scioto County public schools from 1914 to 1942. He was [ precinct committeeman and delegate to the Ohio Republican State conventions in 1935 and 1946 and a trustee of Rio Grande College, in Rio Grande, Ohio.

=== Congress ===
McCowen was elected as a Republican to the Seventy-eighth, Seventy-ninth, and Eightieth Congresses. He was an unsuccessful candidate for reelection in 1948 to the Eighty-first Congress.

== Death ==
He returned to Wheelersburg, Ohio, and continued his activity in politics until his death there in 1953. Interment in South Webster Cemetery in South Webster, Ohio.

== Sources ==
- United States Congress. "Edward Oscar McCowen (id: M000374)". Biographical Directory of the United States Congress.
- The Political Graveyard

U.S. House of Representatives
Preceded by Jacob E. Davis	Member of the U.S. House of Representatives from Ohio's 6th congressional district 1943-1949	Succeeded by James G. Polk
