= Chilton A. White =

American politician

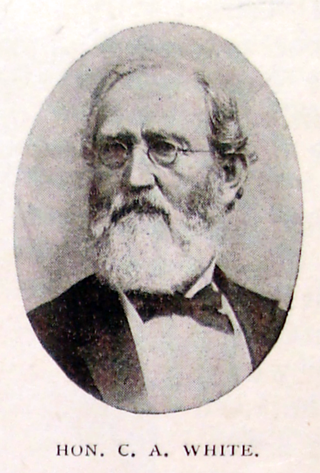

Member of the U.S. House of Representatives from Ohio's 6th district
- In office March 4, 1861 – March 3, 1865
- Preceded by: William Howard
- Succeeded by: Reader W. Clarke

Member of the Ohio Senate from the 4th district
- In office January 2, 1860 – March 3, 1861
- Preceded by: William R. Kinkead
- Succeeded by: John Johnson

Personal details
- Born: Chilton Allen White; February 6, 1826 Georgetown, Ohio, U.S.
- Died: December 7, 1900 (aged 74) Georgetown, Ohio
- Resting place: Confidence Cemetery
- Party: Democratic

Military service
- Allegiance: United States
- Branch/service: United States Army
- Unit: 1st Reg. Ohio Volunteers
- Battles/wars: Mexican–American War

Chilton Allen White (February 6, 1826 – December 7, 1900) was an American lawyer, politician, and white supremacist. He was a Democrat U.S. Representative from Ohio, serving two terms from 1861 to 1865.

== Early life and education ==
Born in Georgetown, Ohio, White attended the public schools and the subscription school run by his father, John D. White, where he befriended Ulysses Grant, a classmate. He taught school. He served in the Mexican–American War with Company G, First Regiment, Ohio Volunteers. He studied law.

== Career ==
He was admitted to the bar in 1848 and commenced the practice of law in Georgetown, Ohio. He served as prosecuting attorney of Brown County from 1852 to 1854. He served as member of the Ohio Senate in 1859 and 1860.

=== Congress ===
White was elected as a Democrat to the Thirty-seventh and Thirty-eighth Congresses (March 4, 1861 – March 3, 1865). His vote on the Thirteenth Amendment is recorded as nay. He was an unsuccessful candidate for reelection in 1864 to the Thirty-ninth Congress.

During the American Civil War, he opposed the use of black soldiers by the U.S. Army, reportedly saying that "This is a Government of white men, made by white men for white men, to be administered, protected, defended, and maintained by white men."

=== Later career ===
He resumed the practice of law in Georgetown. He served as delegate to the State constitutional convention in 1873. He was an unsuccessful candidate for secretary of state in 1896.

== Later life and death ==
He died in Georgetown, Ohio, December 7, 1900. He was interred in Confidence Cemetery.

Ohio Senate
Preceded by William R. Kinkead	Senator from 4th District; January 2, 1860-March 3, 1861	Succeeded by John Johnson
U.S. House of Representatives
Preceded by William Howard	United States Representative from Ohio's 6th congressional district March 4, 1861-March 3, 1865	Succeeded by Reader W. Clarke
