= Reader W. Clarke =

American politician

Reader Wright Clarke
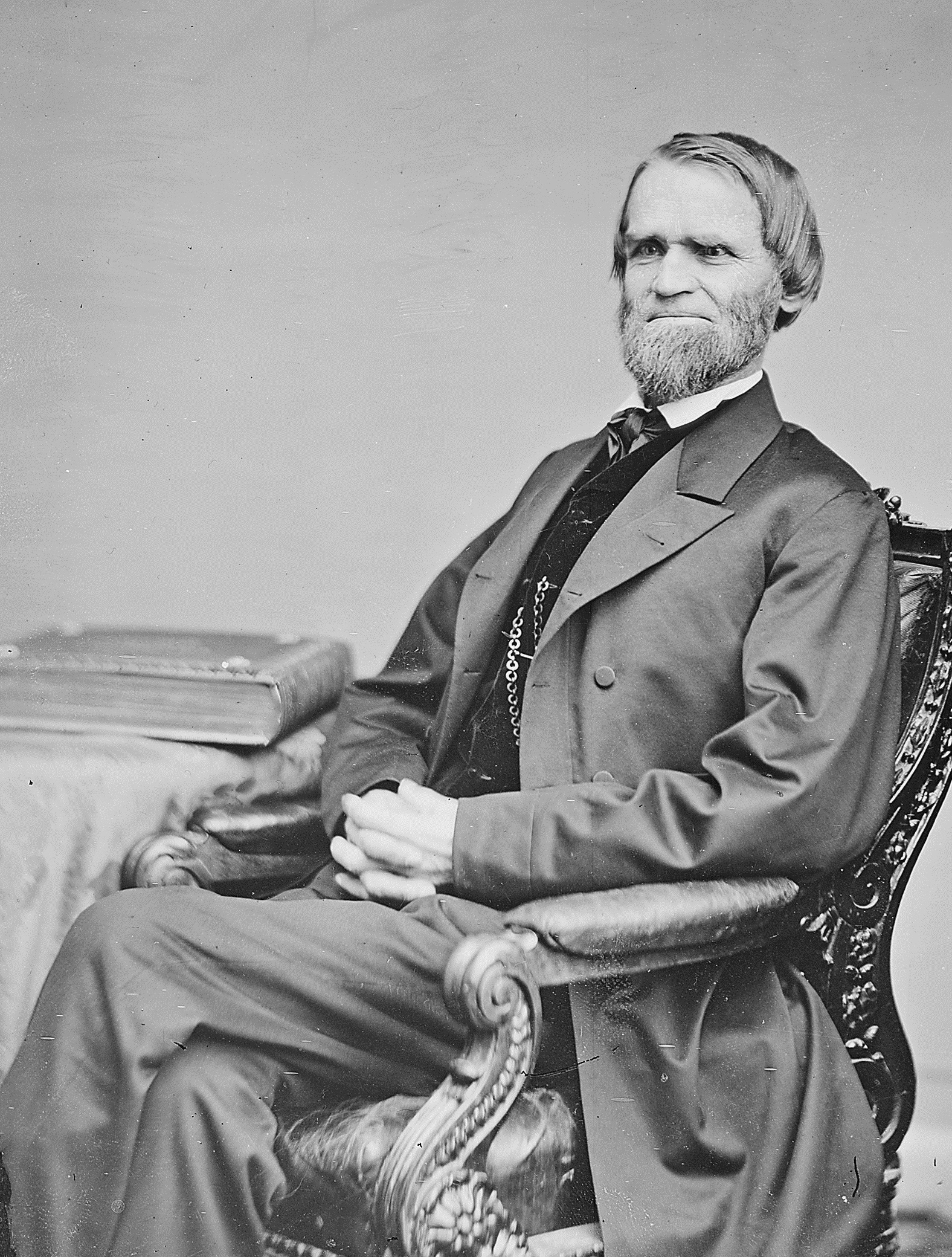

Member of the U.S. House of Representatives from Ohio's 6th district
- In office March 4, 1865 – March 3, 1869
- Preceded by: Chilton A. White
- Succeeded by: John Armstrong Smith

Member of the Ohio House of Representatives from the Clermont County district
- In office December 7, 1840 – December 4, 1842 Serving with Gideon Dunham; Robert B. Harlan; Stephen Evans
- Preceded by: T. J. Buchanan
- Succeeded by: Thomas Ross; D. Fisher; John D. White; Moses Rees

Third Auditor of the Treasury
- In office March 26, 1869 – March 26, 1870
- Preceded by: John Wilson
- Succeeded by: Allan Rutherford

Personal details
- Born: May 18, 1812 Bethel, Ohio
- Died: May 23, 1872 (aged 60) Batavia, Ohio
- Resting place: Union Cemetery, Batavia
- Party: Whig; Republican

Reader Wright Clarke (May 18, 1812 – May 23, 1872) was a U.S. representative from Ohio for two terms from 1865 to 1869.

== Biography ==
Born in Bethel, Ohio, Clarke was the son of Houten Clarke (1766–1835) and Nancy (Riley) Clarke (1786–1857). Clarke learned the art of printing as well as studying law. He was admitted to the bar in 1836 and commenced practice in Batavia, Ohio.

Clarke published a Whig paper in Shawneetown, Illinois before returning to Batavia, Ohio. He also served as member of the State House of Representatives 1840–1842 along with being a Presidential elector in 1844 for Whigs Clay/Frelinghuysen. He also served as clerk of the court of Clermont County 1846–1852.

Clarke was elected as a Republican to the Thirty-ninth and Fortieth Congresses (March 4, 1865 – March 3, 1869). He also become the third auditor of the Treasury from March 26, 1869, to March 26, 1870. Eventually, he was appointed collector of internal revenue in Ohio.

== Death ==
He died in Batavia, Ohio, May 23, 1872, where he was interred in the Union Cemetery.

== Sources ==
- United States Congress. "Reader W. Clarke (id: C000468)". Biographical Directory of the United States Congress.
- Taylor, William Alexander; Taylor, Aubrey Clarence (1899). Ohio statesmen and annals of progress: from the year 1788 to the year 1900 ... Vol. 1. State of Ohio. p. 255.

U.S. House of Representatives
Preceded by Chilton A. White	Member of the U.S. House of Representatives from Ohio's 6th congressional district 1865–1869	Succeeded by John A. Smith
