= Henry Gassaway Kennett =

American politician and lawyer

- Born: August 29, 1835; Cincinnati, Ohio
- Died: January 6, 1895 (aged 59); Cincinnati, Ohio
- Burial place: Spring Grove Cemetery, Cincinnati, Ohio
- Military career
- Allegiance: United States; Union
- Branch: United States Army; Union Army
- Rank: Bvt. Brigadier General
- Unit: 79th Ohio Infantry Regiment
- Conflicts: American Civil War
- Other work: Ohio House of Representatives

Henry Gassaway Kennett (August 29, 1835 – January 6, 1895) was an American politician and lawyer who served as a Union brevet brigadier general during the period of the American Civil War.

Kennett began the war serving as a lieutenant colonel for the 27th Ohio. He later served as a colonel of the 79th Ohio Infantry Regiment and led this regiment in Tennessee. Kennett resigned from the Union army on August 1, 1864. He was later named a brevet brigadier general with a promotion date of March 13, 1865. After the war, Kennett served as a member of the Ohio House of Representatives. He died in 1895, in Cincinnati.

His father, Colonel John Kennett, who was born in St. Petersburg, Russia, had attended Harvard College, and had co-owned a large tobacco company in Cincinnati before leading the 4th Ohio Cavalry Regiment from 1861 until 1863.

== See also ==
- List of American Civil War generals
