= Charles Cyrus Kearns =

American politician

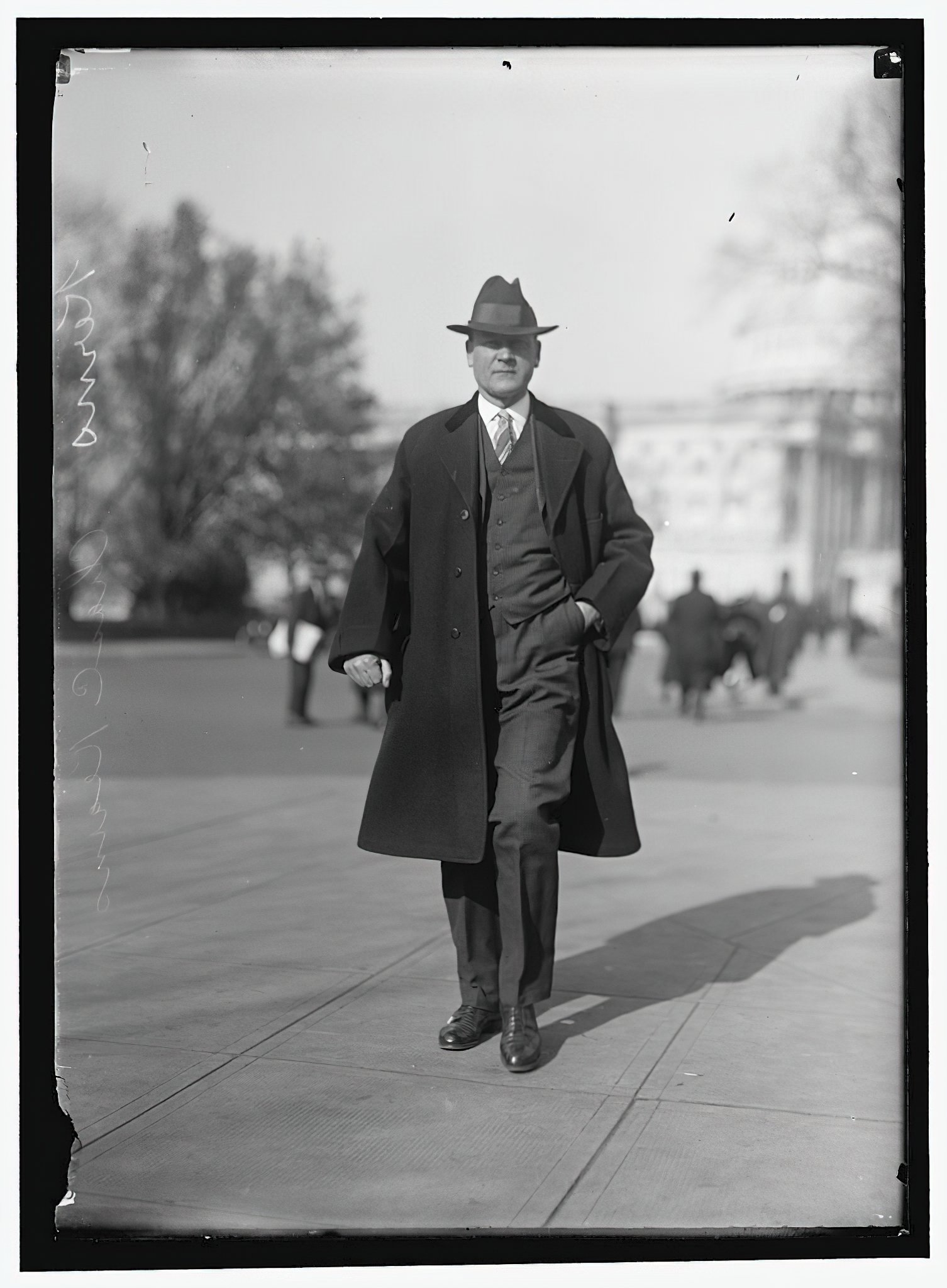
- Kearns in Washington, D.C. in 1916

Member of the U.S. House of Representatives from Ohio's 6th district
- In office March 4, 1915 – March 3, 1931
- Preceded by: Simeon D. Fess
- Succeeded by: James G. Polk

Personal details
- Born: February 11, 1869 Tonica, Illinois, US
- Died: December 17, 1931 (aged 62) Amelia, Ohio, US
- Resting place: Mount Moriah Cemetery
- Party: Republican
- Education: Ohio Northern University, National Normal University, Cincinnati Law School

Charles Cyrus Kearns (February 11, 1869 – December 17, 1931) was an American lawyer and politician who served as a Republican member of the U.S. House of Representatives from Ohio from 1915 to 1931.

== Biography ==
Charles C. Kearns was born in Tonica, Illinois. He moved with his parents to Georgetown, Ohio, in 1874. He attended the public schools in Georgetown, Ohio, Ohio Northern University at Ada, and National Noral University in Lebanon, Ohio. He taught school in Brown County, Ohio.

He graduated from the Cincinnati Law School in 1894, and was admitted to the bar the same year and commenced practice in Batavia, Ohio. He was the managing editor of the Las Vegas Daily Record in Las Vegas, New Mexico, in 1900 and 1901 and of the Daily Record in Hot Springs, Arkansas, in 1901 and 1902. He returned to Ohio in 1903 and practiced law in Batavia. He was the prosecuting attorney of Clermont County, Ohio, from 1906 to 1909.

Kearns was a member of the Odd Fellows and Knights of Pythias.

=== Congress ===
Kearns was elected as a Republican to the Sixty-fourth and to the seven succeeding Congresses. During his last campaign, Kearns was endorsed by the Anti-Saloon League, but he was an unsuccessful candidate for reelection in 1930 to the Seventy-second Congress.

=== Later career and death ===
He was engaged in the practice of law at Cincinnati, Ohio, in 1930, and died in Amelia, Ohio. Interment in Mount Moriah Cemetery in Tobasco, Ohio.

U.S. House of Representatives
Preceded by Simeon D. Fess	Member of the U.S. House of Representatives from Ohio's 6th congressional district 1915–1931	Succeeded by James G. Polk
