= Seth W. Brown =

American politician (1841–1923)

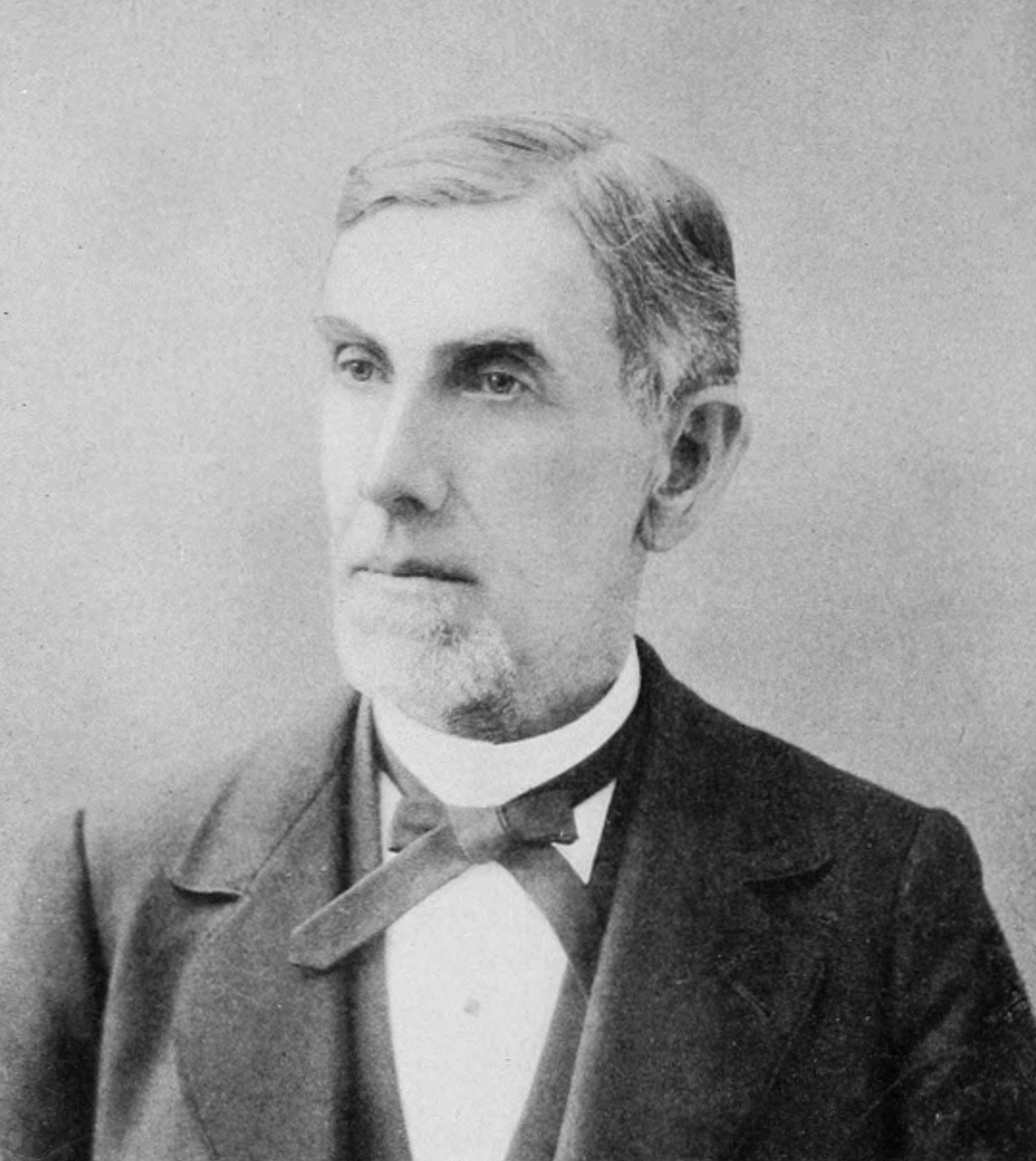

Member of the U.S. House of Representatives from Ohio's 6th district
- In office March 4, 1897 – March 3, 1901
- Preceded by: George W. Hulick
- Succeeded by: Charles Q. Hildebrant

Member of the Ohio House of Representatives from the Warren County district
- In office January 7, 1884 – January 1, 1888
- Preceded by: James Scott
- Succeeded by: William T. Whitacre

Prosecutor of Warren County
- In office 1880–1883

Personal details
- Born: January 4, 1841 Waynesville, Ohio, U.S.
- Died: February 24, 1923 (aged 82) Lebanon, Ohio, U.S.
- Resting place: Miami Cemetery
- Party: Republican

Military service
- Allegiance: United States
- Branch/service: Union Army
- Unit: 79th Ohio Infantry
- Battles/wars: United States Civil War

Seth W. Brown (January 4, 1841 – February 24, 1923) was a U.S. representative from Ohio.

He was born near Waynesville, Ohio and attended the public schools. During the Civil War, Brown served in Company H, Seventy-ninth Regiment, Ohio Volunteer Infantry. After the war, he engaged in the newspaper business, studied law, and was admitted to the bar in 1873, commencing practice in Waynesville, Ohio.

He served as prosecuting attorney for Warren County from 1880 to 1883. He resumed practicing law in Lebanon, Ohio, before serving as a member of the Ohio House of Representatives from 1883 to 1887. Brown was a presidential elector in 1888 for the Republican presidential and vice-presidential ticket of Harrison/Morton.

Brown was elected as a Republican to the Fifty-fifth and Fifty-sixth Congresses (March 4, 1897 to March 3, 1901). He unsuccessfully ran for renomination in 1900. After his retirement, Brown resumed his law practice in Lebanon and Cincinnati, Ohio. Until his death, Brown was a writer on political and governmental subjects. Brown died in Lebanon, Ohio, February 24, 1923, and was interred in Miami Cemetery, Waynesville, Ohio.

== Sources ==
- United States Congress. "Seth W. Brown (id: B000943)". Biographical Directory of the United States Congress.
- Taylor, William Alexander; Taylor, Aubrey Clarence (1899). Ohio statesmen and annals of progress: from the year 1788 to the year 1900 ... Vol. 2. State of Ohio. p. 106.

U.S. House of Representatives
Preceded by George W. Hulick	Member of the U.S. House of Representatives from Ohio's 6th congressional district 1897–1901	Succeeded by Charles Q. Hildebrant
