= Jonas R. Emrie =

American politician

Jonas Reece Emrie
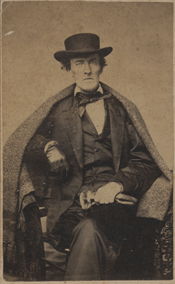

Member of the U.S. House of Representatives from Ohio's 6th district
- In office March 4, 1855 – March 3, 1857
- Preceded by: Andrew Ellison
- Succeeded by: Joseph R. Cockerill

Member of the Ohio Senate from Adams & Highland counties
- In office December 6, 1847 – December 2, 1849
- Preceded by: Tilberry Reid
- Succeeded by: Ruel Beeson

Personal details
- Born: April 25, 1812 Hillsboro, Ohio, US
- Died: June 5, 1869 (aged 57) Mound City, Illinois, US
- Resting place: Beech Grove Cemetery
- Party: Anti-Nebraska

Jonas Reece Emrie (April 25, 1812 – June 5, 1869) was a U.S. representative from Ohio.

Born in Hillsboro, Ohio, Emrie pursued preparatory studies. He studied law. He was admitted to the bar and commenced practice in Hillsboro, Ohio. He was editor and publisher of the Hillsboro Gazette 1839–1848 and 1854–1856. Leader in organizing the Hillsboro Female College. He was appointed postmaster of Hillsboro on April 8, 1839, and served until February 23, 1841. He served as member of the State senate in 1847 and 1848. First probate judge of Highland County 1851–1854.

Emrie was elected as an Anti-Nebraska candidate to the Thirty-fourth Congress (March 4, 1855 – March 3, 1857). He was an unsuccessful candidate for reelection in 1856 to the Thirty-fifth Congress. He moved to Mound City, Illinois, in 1857. He engaged in mercantile pursuits, conducted a newspaper, and practiced law. Police magistrate of the city in 1858. Township treasurer of schools. He served as master in chancery of Pulaski County, Illinois. He died in Mound City, Illinois, June 5, 1869. He was interred in Beech Grove Cemetery.

U.S. House of Representatives
Preceded by Andrew Ellison	Member of the U.S. House of Representatives from Ohio's 6th congressional district March 4, 1855-March 3, 1857	Succeeded by Joseph R. Cockerill
Ohio Senate
Preceded by Tilberry Reid	Senator from Adams & Highland counties December 6, 1847-December 2, 1849	Succeeded by Ruel Beeson
