= James G. Polk =

American politician

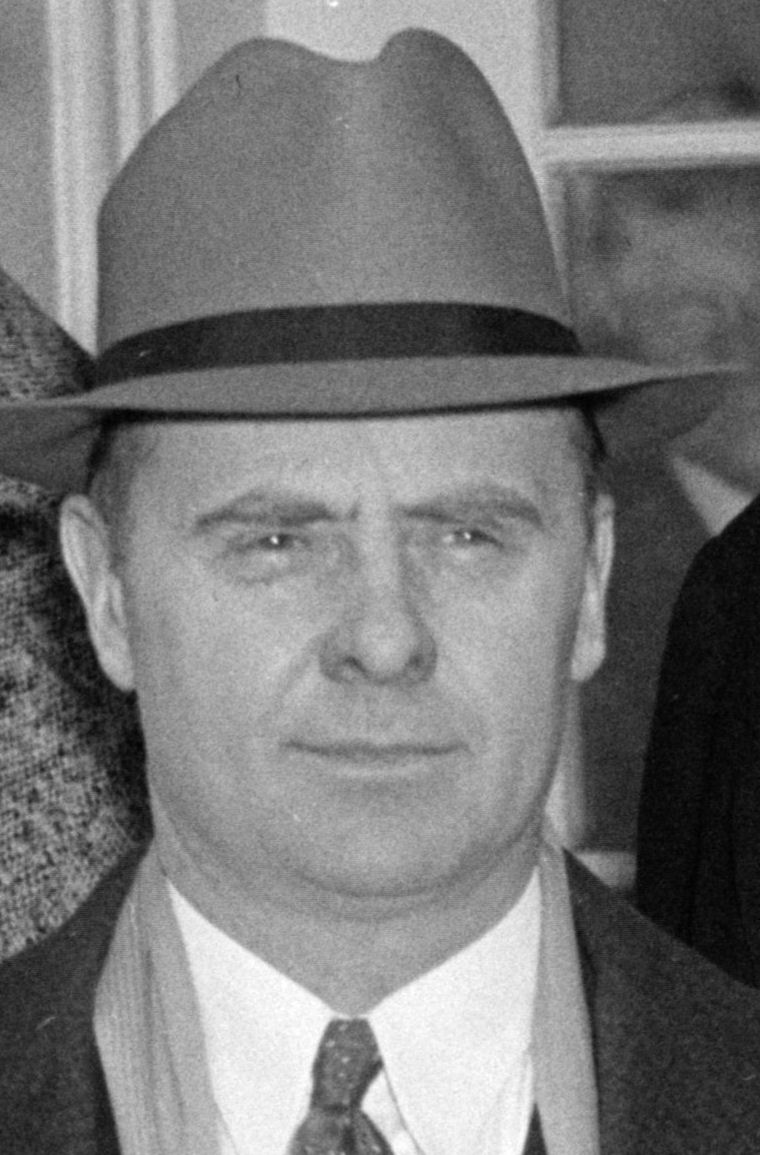
- Leaving White House, March 7, 1938.

Member of the U.S. House of Representatives from Ohio's 6th district
- In office March 4, 1931 – January 3, 1941
- Preceded by: Charles Cyrus Kearns
- Succeeded by: Jacob E. Davis
- In office January 3, 1949 – April 28, 1959
- Preceded by: Edward Oscar McCowen
- Succeeded by: Ward Miller

Personal details
- Born: James Gould Polk; October 6, 1896 Highland County, Ohio
- Died: April 28, 1959 (aged 62) Washington, D.C.
- Resting place: Highland Cemetery, Highland, Ohio
- Party: Democratic
- Relations: James K. Polk, distant cousin Leonidas Polk, distant cousin James H. Polk, William Polk (colonel), cousin
- Education: Ohio State University

James Gould Polk (October 6, 1896 – April 28, 1959) was a prominent U.S. politician of the Democratic Party during the middle of the 20th century.

A native of Highland County, Ohio, Polk grew up on a farm and graduated from high school in New Vienna, Ohio. He did not serve during World War I because of a physical disability, and graduated from Ohio State University in 1919.

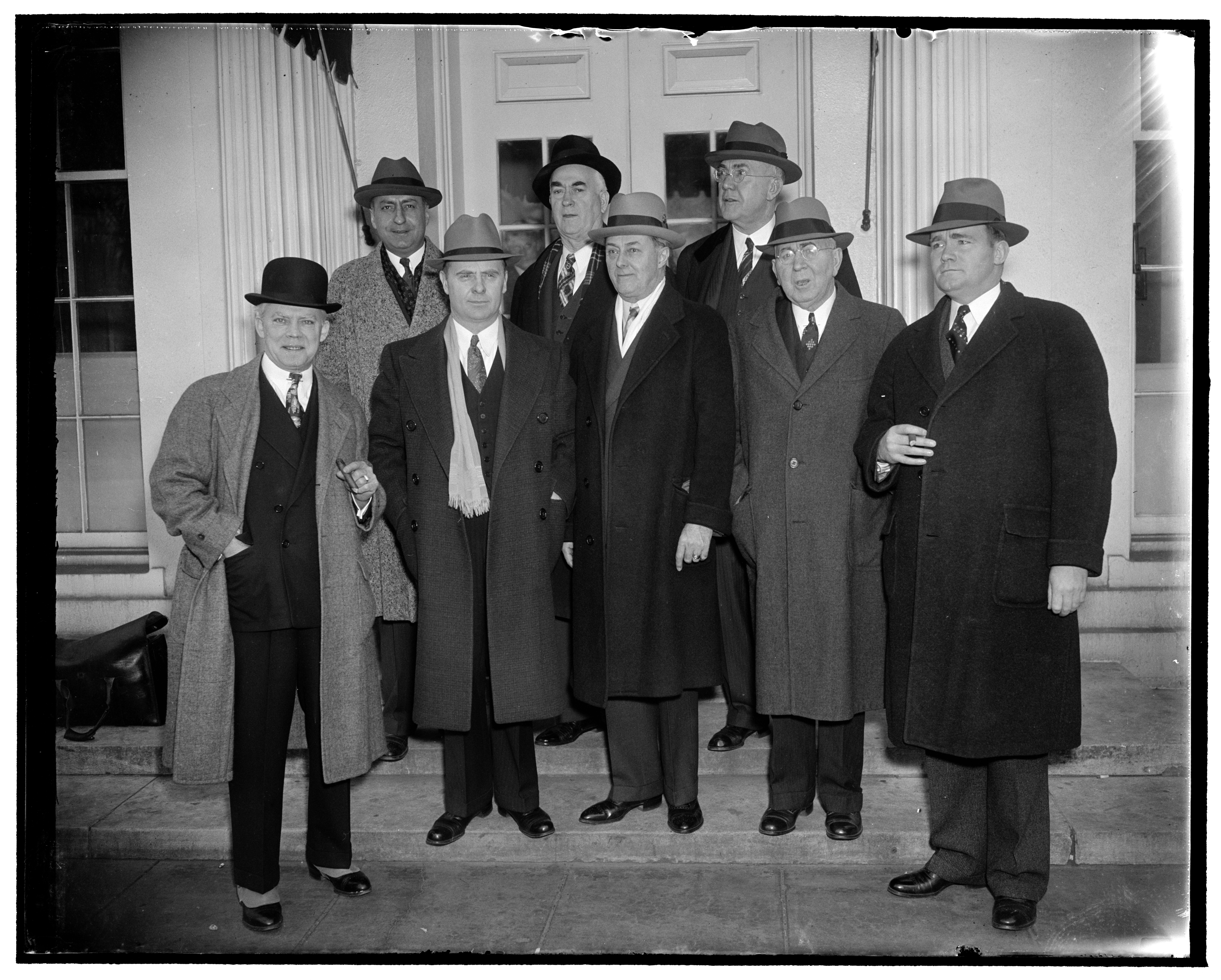
Group of legislators leaves White House after asking Franklin D. Roosevelt for $80,000,000 for flood control in Ohio Valley, March 7, 1938. front: l-r Joseph A. Dixon, James G. Polk, Eugene B. Crowe, G. W. Johnson, Lawrence E. Imhoff, rear l-r : Peter J. De Muth, Kent E. Keller, Brent Spence.

Polk worked as a school administrator in small towns in Ohio during the 1920s, and was first elected to office in 1930, as a U.S. Congressman from Ohio's 6th District. He won five elections in a row before stepping down in 1941.

During World War II, Polk worked as a special assistant in the U.S. Department of Agriculture in Washington, D.C.

After the war, Polk re-entered politics, and won back his old Congressional seat in the 1948 election. He remained in Congress until his death.

Polk died of cancer on April 28, 1959, in Washington, D.C. His remains are buried in Highland Cemetery in Highland, Ohio.

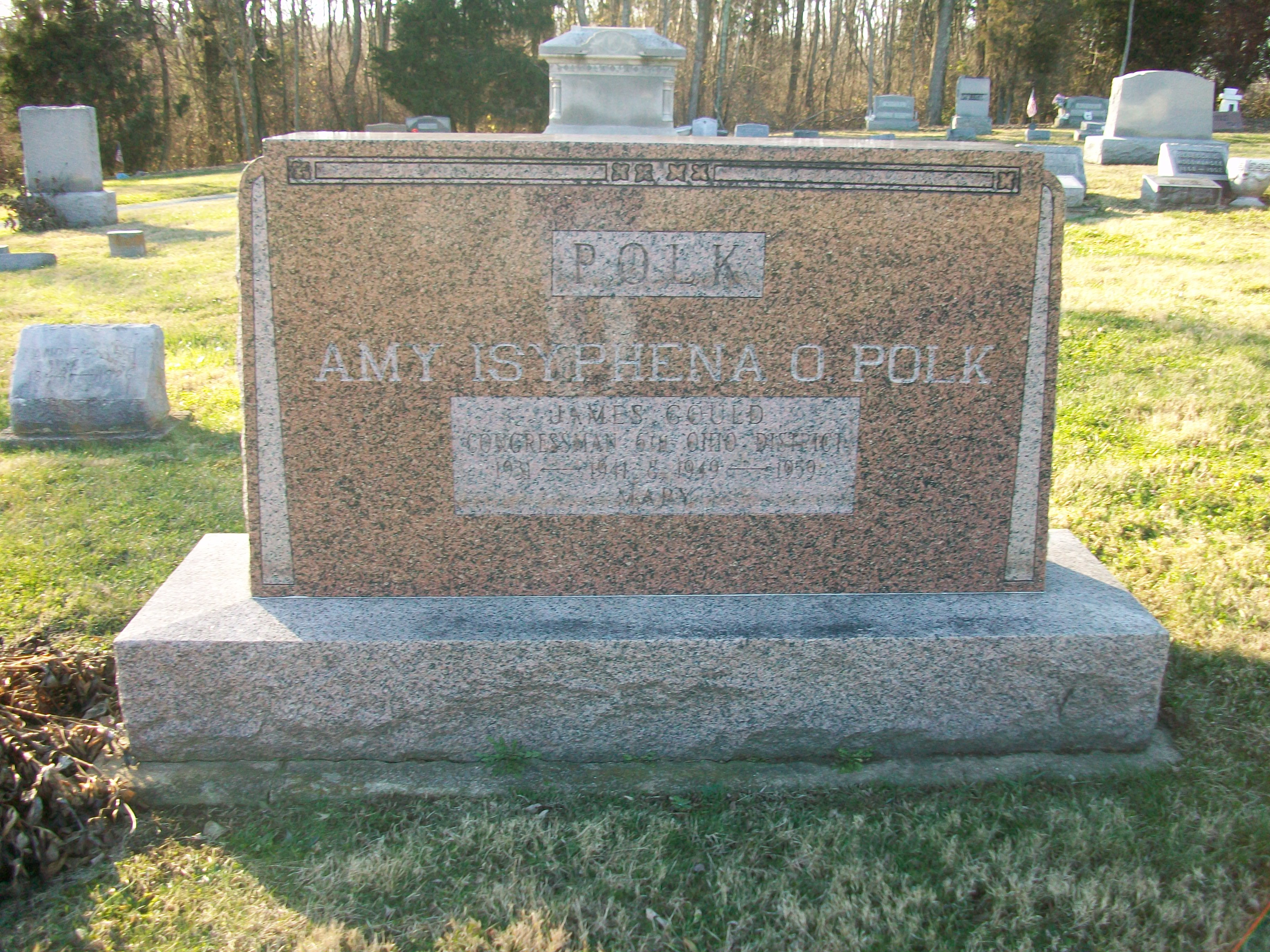
Headstone of James G. Polk located in the Highland Cemetery in Highland, Ohio.

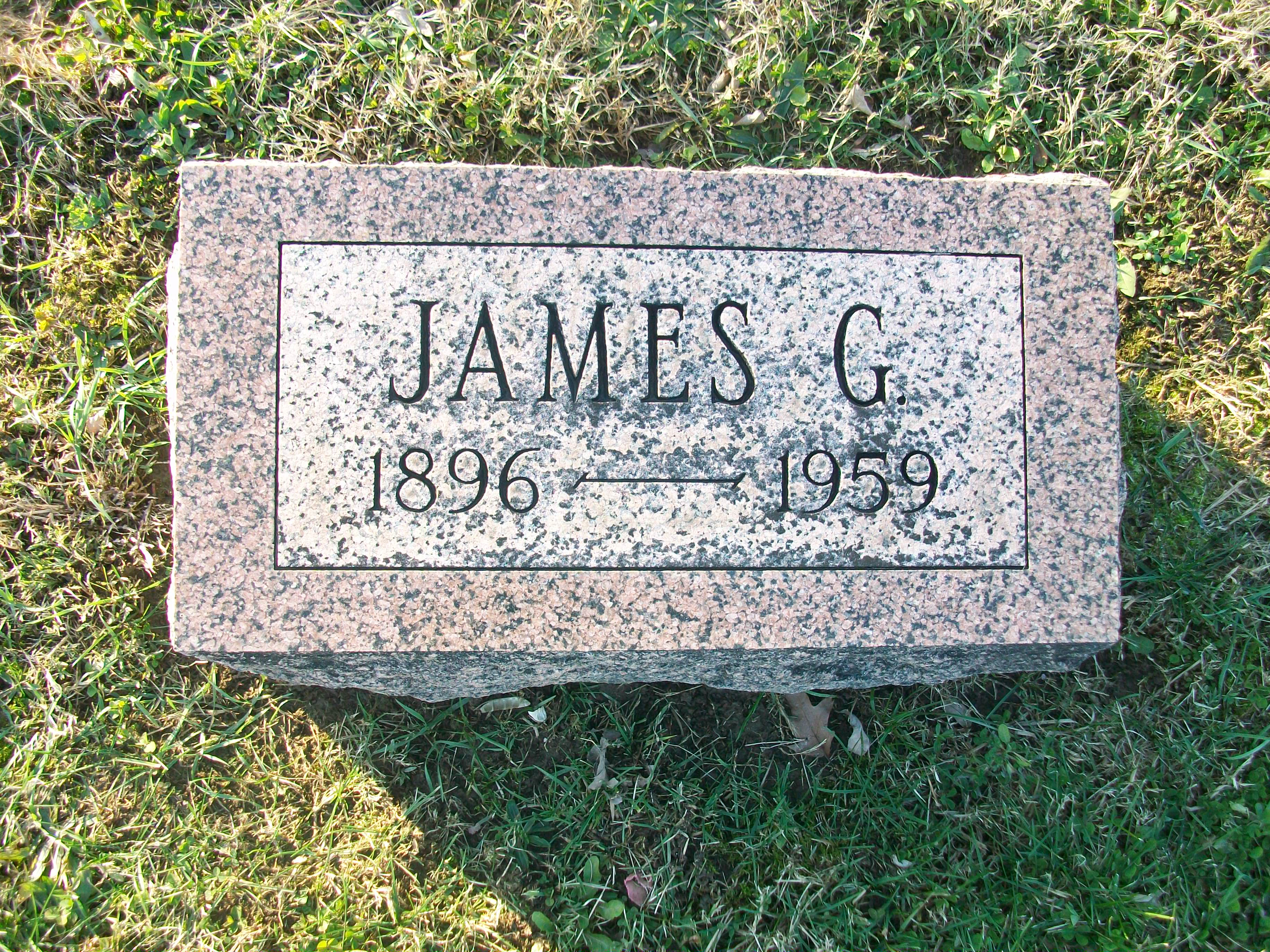
Gravemarker of James G. Polk located in the Highland Cemetery in Highland, Ohio.

== See also ==
- List of members of the United States Congress who died in office (1950–1999)

== Sources ==
- Biographical Directory of the United States Congress: POLK, James Gould

U.S. House of Representatives
Preceded by Charles C. Kearns	Member of the U.S. House of Representatives from Ohio's 6th congressional district 1931–1941	Succeeded by Jacob E. Davis
Preceded by Edward O. McCowen	Member of the U.S. House of Representatives from Ohio's 6th congressional district 1949–1959	Succeeded by Ward Miller
