= Bill Harsha =

American lawyer and politician (1921–2010)

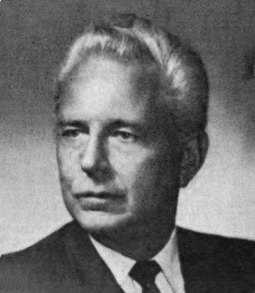

Member of the U.S. House of Representatives from Ohio's 6th district
- In office January 3, 1961 – January 3, 1981
- Preceded by: Ward Miller
- Succeeded by: Bob McEwen

Personal details
- Born: William Howard Harsha, Jr. January 1, 1921 Portsmouth, Ohio, U.S.
- Died: October 11, 2010 (aged 89) Portsmouth, Ohio, U.S.
- Resting place: Greenlawn Cemetery, Portsmouth
- Party: Republican
- Spouse: Rosemary L. Spellerberg (m. 1946)
- Education: Kenyon College; Case Western Reserve University School of Law

Military service
- Allegiance: United States
- Branch/service: United States Marine Corps
- Years of service: 1942–1944
- Battles/wars: World War II

William Howard Harsha Jr. (January 1, 1921 – October 11, 2010) was an American lawyer, politician, and World War II veteran who represented Ohio as a Republican in the United States House of Representatives from January 3, 1961, to January 3, 1981.

== Biography ==
Born in Portsmouth, Ohio, he graduated from Portsmouth High School in 1939. He received his B.A. from Kenyon College in Gambier, Ohio, in 1943, where he was initiated into Sigma Pi fraternity, and his LL.B. from Western Reserve University in Cleveland, Ohio, in 1947. From 1942 to 1944, he was in the United States Marine Corps.

After his admission to the bar on March 6, 1947, he was the city of Portsmouth's assistant solicitor until 1951, when he was elected Scioto County Prosecuting Attorney. He served one four-year term. In 1961, he was elected to Congress and served twenty years there. Harsha voted in favor of the Civil Rights Acts of 1964 and 1968, as well as the 24th Amendment to the U.S. Constitution and the Voting Rights Act of 1965. He was succeeded by Bob McEwen, who had managed two of his re-election campaigns. After his retirement from Congress, he was a consultant in Washington, D.C., from 1981 to 1986, when he returned to Portsmouth and resumed his law practice.

== Death ==
He died in 2010 in Portsmouth, Ohio, aged 89.

== Legacy ==
An artificial lake on the East Fork of the Little Miami River in Clermont County near Batavia is named for him (see East Fork State Park), as is the William H. Harsha Bridge, which spans the Ohio River between Ohio and Kentucky.

== Family ==
Harsha married Rosemary L. Spellerberg on June 24, 1946. Their son, William H. Harsha III, is a judge of the Ohio Court of Appeals for the Fourth Appellate District.

== Notes ==
U.S. House of Representatives
Preceded by Ward Miller	Member of the U.S. House of Representatives from Ohio's 6th congressional district 1961–1981	Succeeded by Bob McEwen
