= James M. Ritchie =

American politician (1829–1918)

James Monroe Ritchie

Member of the U.S. House of Representatives from Ohio's 6th district
- In office March 4, 1881 – March 3, 1883
- Preceded by: William D. Hill
- Succeeded by: William D. Hill

Personal details
- Born: July 28, 1829 Dunfermline, Scotland, U.K.
- Died: August 17, 1918 (aged 89) Toledo, Ohio, U.S.
- Resting place: Grafton Cemetery, Grafton, Ohio
- Party: Republican

James Monroe Ritchie (July 28, 1829 – August 17, 1918) was an American lawyer and politician who served one term as a U.S. representative from Ohio from 1881 to 1883. He was the father of Byron Foster Ritchie.

== Biography ==
Born in Dunfermline, Scotland, Ritchie immigrated to the United States in 1832 with his parents, who settled in St. Lawrence County, New York. His early schooling was limited and he received instruction at home from his father and mother. He studied law. He was admitted to the bar in 1858 and commenced practice in Toledo, Ohio. He served as delegate to the Republican National Convention in 1880.

=== Congress ===
Ritchie was elected as a Republican to the Forty-seventh Congress (March 4, 1881 – March 3, 1883). He was not a candidate for renomination in 1882.

=== Later career and death ===
He again resumed the practice of his profession in Toledo, Ohio, and died there August 17, 1918. He was interred in Grafton Cemetery, Grafton, Ohio.

== Sources ==
- United States Congress. "James M. Ritchie (id: R000274)". Biographical Directory of the United States Congress.

U.S. House of Representatives
Preceded by William D. Hill	Member of the U.S. House of Representatives from Ohio's 6th congressional district 1881–1883	Succeeded by William D. Hill
