= Texas, Ohio =

Unincorporated community in Ohio, U.S.

Coordinates: 41°25′25″N 83°57′06″W

Texas is an unincorporated community in Henry County, in the U.S. state of Ohio.

== History ==
A post office called Texas was established in 1846, and remained in operation until 1903. Texas was briefly considered to become county seat after a fire burned the courthouse in 1847. The community was named after the state of Texas.

A public ferry was used to connect the banks and the expense was paid by the county. On July 22, 1909, this ferry was sold by the commissioners to Theodore Wagner for $75.00 and it was run as a toll ferry. At one time there was a barrel factory, a handle factory, and a brick factory.
