= Highland, Ohio =

- Village
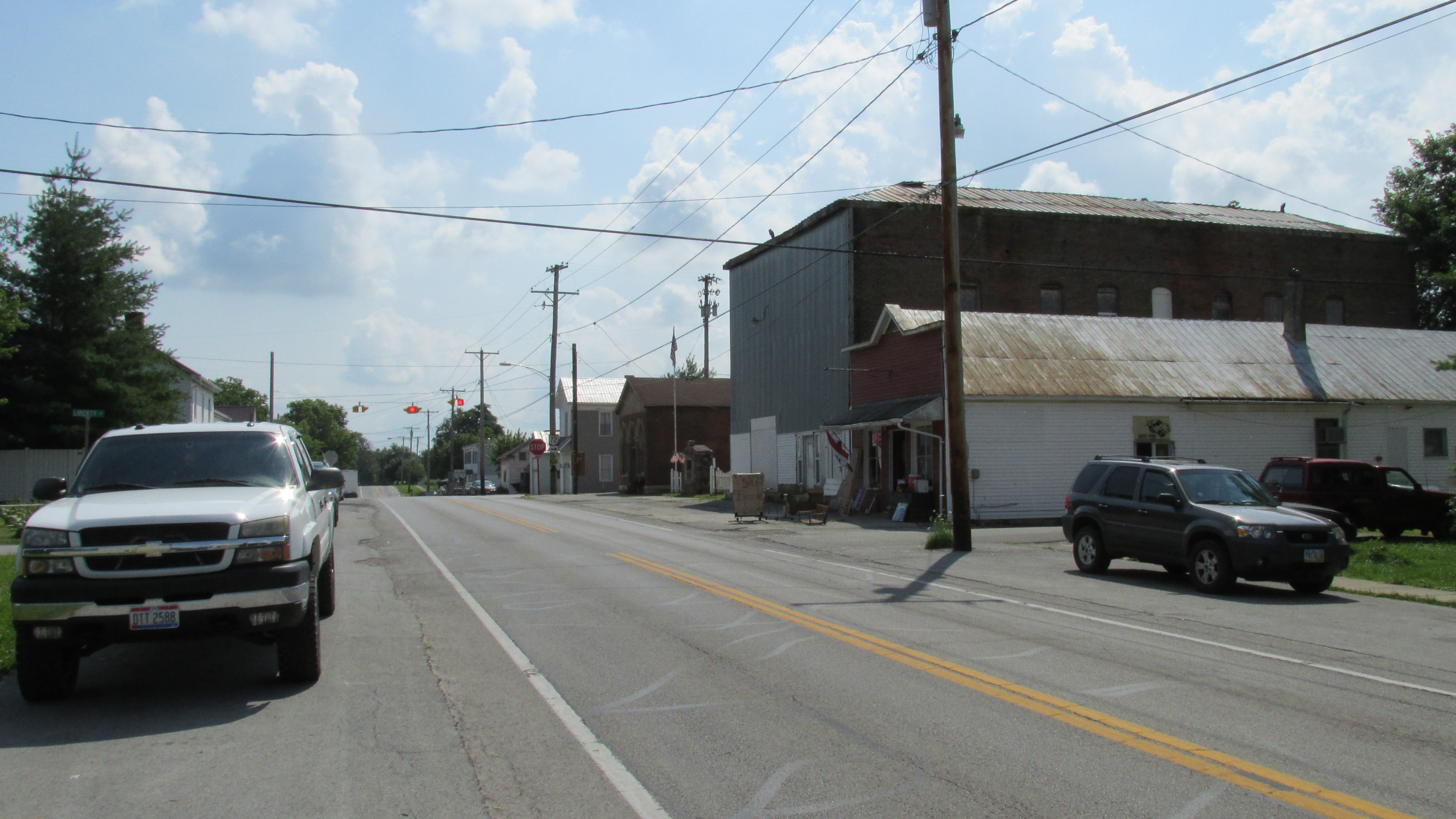
- Looking east on Main Street (Ohio State Route 28) in Highland

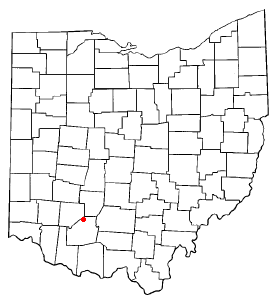
- Location of Highland, Ohio

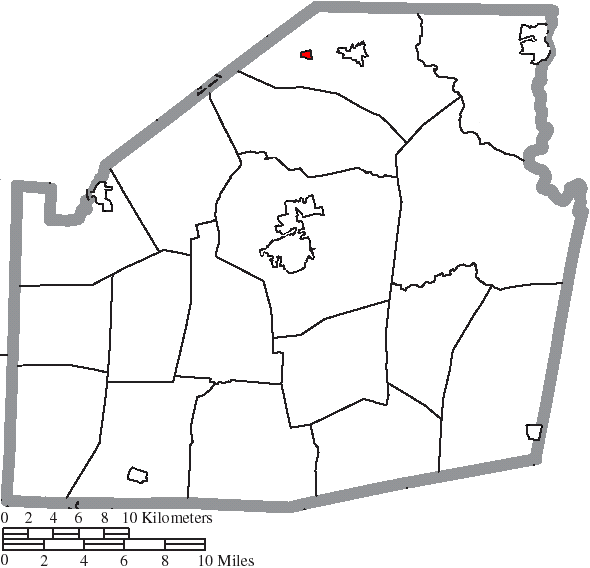
- Location of Highland in Highland County
- Coordinates: 39°20′40″N 83°35′51″W
- Country: United States
- State: Ohio
- County: Highland

Government
  - Mayor: Matthew Miller

Area
  - Total: 0.17 sq mi (0.44 km^{2})
  - Land: 0.17 sq mi (0.44 km^{2})
  - Water: 0 sq mi (0.00 km^{2})
- Elevation: 1,066 ft (325 m)

Population (2020)
  - Total: 232
  - Estimate (2023): 228
  - Density: 1,365/sq mi (527.2/km^{2})
- Time zone: UTC-5 (Eastern (EST))
  - Summer (DST): UTC-4 (EDT)
- ZIP code: 45132
- Area codes: 937, 326
- FIPS code: 39-35210
- GNIS feature ID: 1064836
- Website: https://villageofhighland.weebly.com/

Highland is a village in Fairfield Township, Highland County, Ohio, United States. The population was 232 at the 2020 census.

== History ==
Highland was originally called Lexington, and under the latter name laid out in 1816.

== Geography ==
According to the United States Census Bureau, the village has a total area of 0.17 square miles (0.44 km^{2}), all land.

== Demographics ==
Historical population
Census	Pop.	Note	%±
1880	139		—
1890	210		51.1%
1900	265		26.2%
1910	272		2.6%
1920	235		−13.6%
1930	231		−1.7%
1940	262		13.4%
1950	280		6.9%
1960	265		−5.4%
1970	243		−8.3%
1980	284		16.9%
1990	275		−3.2%
2000	283		2.9%
2010	254		−10.2%
2020	232		−8.7%
2023 (est.)	228	▼	−1.7%
U.S. Decennial Census

=== 2010 census ===
As of the census of 2010, there were 254 people, 93 households, and 65 families living in the village. The population density was 1,494.1 inhabitants per square mile (576.9/km^{2}). There were 105 housing units at an average density of 617.6 per square mile (238.5/km^{2}). The racial makeup of the village was 96.5% White, 0.8% African American, 1.2% Native American, and 1.6% from two or more races. Hispanic or Latino of any race were 2.8% of the population.

There were 93 households, of which 41.9% had children under the age of 18 living with them, 45.2% were married couples living together, 11.8% had a female householder with no husband present, 12.9% had a male householder with no wife present, and 30.1% were non-families. 25.8% of all households were made up of individuals, and 12.9% had someone living alone who was 65 years of age or older. The average household size was 2.73 and the average family size was 3.09.

The median age in the village was 33 years. 30.3% of residents were under the age of 18; 10.3% were between the ages of 18 and 24; 24.4% were from 25 to 44; 22% were from 45 to 64; and 13% were 65 years of age or older. The gender makeup of the village was 46.9% male and 53.1% female.

=== 2000 census ===
As of the census of 2000, there were 283 people, 108 households, and 77 families living in the village. The population density was 1,713.5 inhabitants per square mile (661.6/km^{2}). There were 115 housing units at an average density of 696.3 per square mile (268.8/km^{2}). The racial makeup of the village was 96.11% White, 0.71% African American, 0.35% from other races, and 2.83% from two or more races. Hispanic or Latino of any race were 0.35% of the population.

There were 108 households, out of which 36.1% had children under the age of 18 living with them, 57.4% were married couples living together, 8.3% had a female householder with no husband present, and 28.7% were non-families. 20.4% of all households were made up of individuals, and 6.5% had someone living alone who was 65 years of age or older. The average household size was 2.62 and the average family size was 3.03.

In the village, the population was spread out, with 25.8% under the age of 18, 11.3% from 18 to 24, 33.9% from 25 to 44, 19.8% from 45 to 64, and 9.2% who were 65 years of age or older. The median age was 33 years. For every 100 females there were 105.1 males. For every 100 females age 18 and over, there were 98.1 males.

The median income for a household in the village was $41,964, and the median income for a family was $47,500. Males had a median income of $30,000 versus $24,375 for females. The per capita income for the village was $14,005. About 5.1% of families and 10.1% of the population were below the poverty line, including 17.9% of those under the age of eighteen and 9.1% of those 65 or over.

== Notable people ==
- James G. Polk, U.S. congressman

== Gallery ==
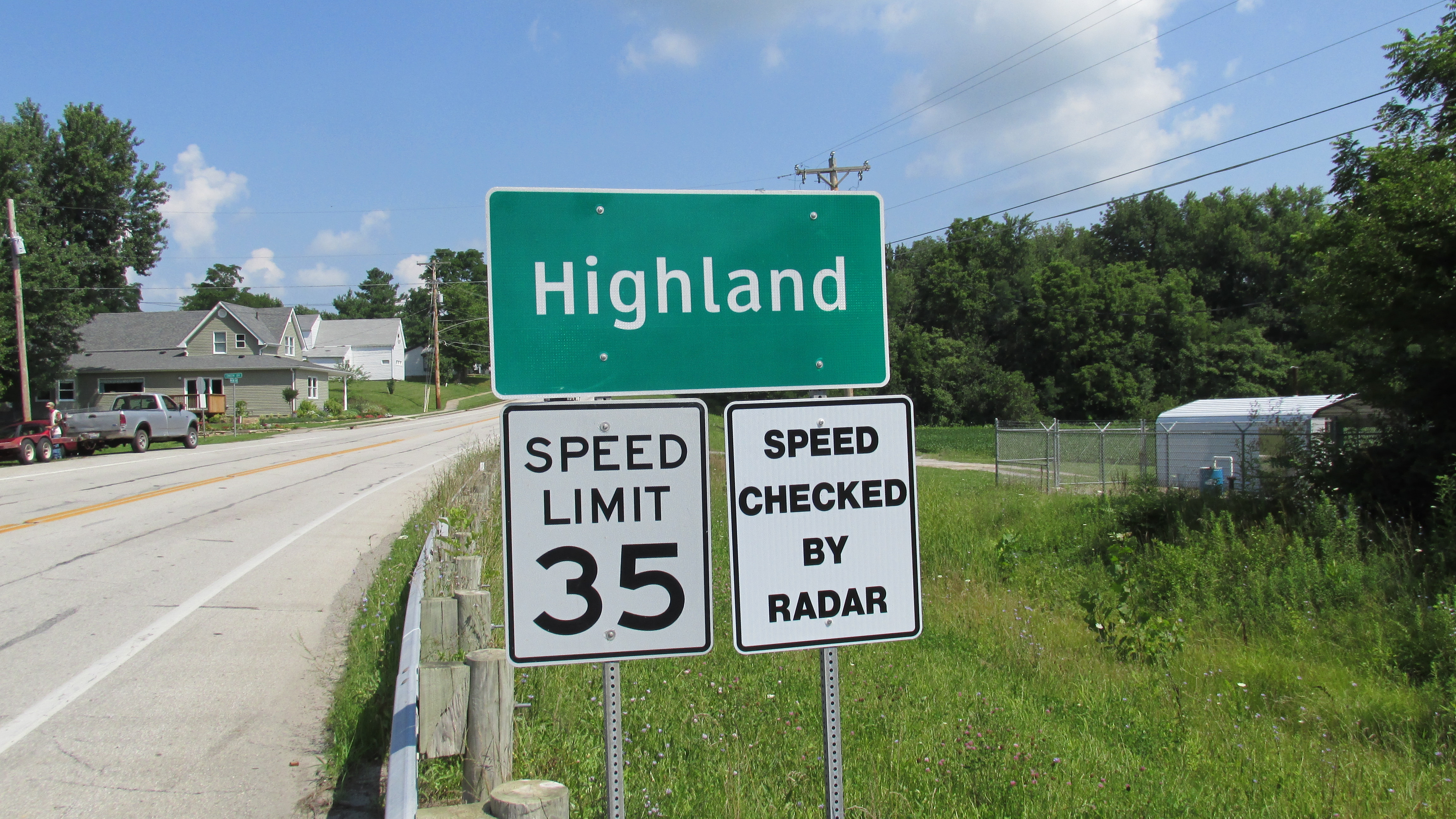
Highland community sign

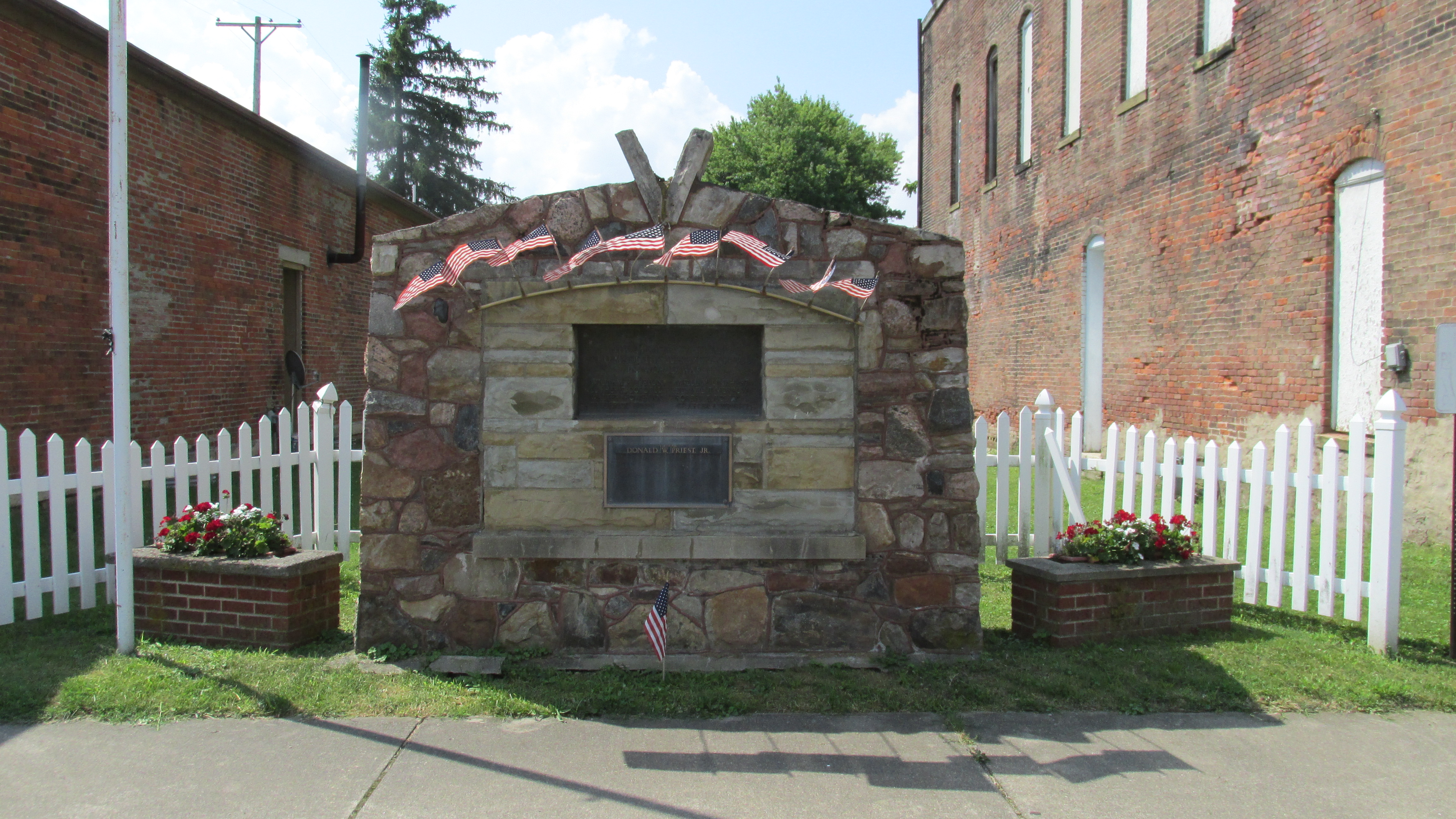
World War Two veterans memorial. Dedicated on November 21, 1942
