= Jacob E. Davis =

American politician

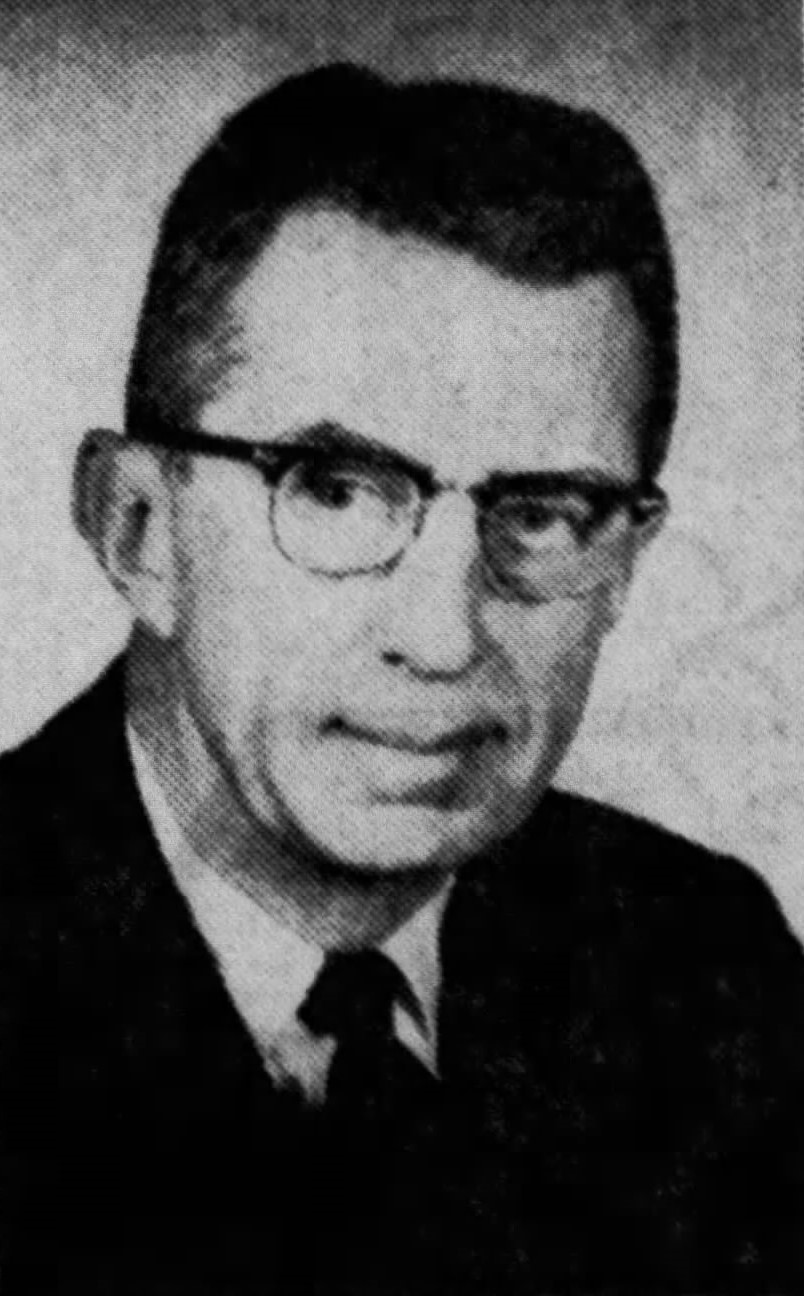

Member of the U.S. House of Representatives from Ohio's 6th district
- In office January 3, 1941 – January 3, 1943
- Preceded by: James G. Polk
- Succeeded by: Edward O. McCowen

Member of the Ohio House of Representatives
- In office 1935-1937

Personal details
- Born: October 31, 1905 Beaver, Ohio, US
- Died: February 28, 2003 (aged 97) Naples, Florida, US
- Resting place: Spring Grove Mausoleum
- Party: Democratic
- Education: Ohio State University (AB); Harvard Law School (JD)

Jacob Erastus Davis (October 31, 1905 – February 28, 2003) was a Democratic member of the U.S. House of Representatives from Ohio. He served a single term from 1941 to 1943.

== Early life and career ==
Jacob E. Davis was born in Beaver, Ohio. He graduated from Beaver High School in 1923. He received his A.B. from Ohio State University in Columbus, Ohio, in 1927, and J.D. from Harvard University in Cambridge, Massachusetts, in 1930. He worked as a lawyer in private practice, and served as prosecuting attorney of Pike County, Ohio, from 1931 to 1935. He was a member of the Ohio House of Representatives from 1935 to 1937, serving as speaker pro tempore and majority floor leader in 1937. He was common pleas judge of Pike County, Ohio, from 1937 to 1940.

== Congress ==
Davis was elected as a Democrat to the Seventy-seventh Congress. He was an unsuccessful candidate for reelection to the Seventy-eighth Congress in 1942.

== Later career and death ==
He was special assistant to the United States Secretary of the Navy from 1943 to 1944. He was vice president of Kroger Company of Cincinnati, Ohio, from 1945 to 1960 and president and CEO from 1961 to 1970.

He died on February 28, 2003, in Naples, Florida. Interment in Spring Grove Mausoleum in Cincinnati, Ohio.

U.S. House of Representatives
Preceded by James G. Polk	Member of the U.S. House of Representatives from Ohio's 6th congressional district 1941 - 1943	Succeeded by Edward O. McCowen
