= George W. Hulick =

American politician

George W. Huluck
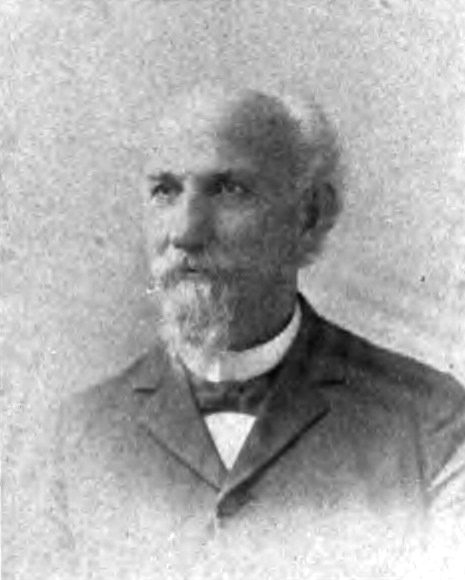

Member of the U.S. House of Representatives from Ohio's 6th district
- In office March 4, 1893 – March 4, 1897
- Preceded by: Dennis D. Donovan
- Succeeded by: Seth W. Brown

Personal details
- Born: George Washington Hulick; June 29, 1833 Batavia, Ohio, US
- Died: August 13, 1907 (aged 74) Batavia, Ohio, US
- Resting place: Union Cemetery
- Party: Republican
- Education: Farmers' College

George Washington Hulick (June 29, 1833 – August 13, 1907) was a teacher, lawyer, soldier, judge, and a two-term U.S. representative from Ohio from 1893 to 1897.

== Biography ==
Born in Batavia, Ohio, Hulick attended the public schools and graduated from Farmers' College, near Cincinnati. He took charge of Pleasant Hill Academy and taught for two years. Hulick then studied law and was admitted to the bar in 1857. He subsequently commenced his law practice in Batavia.

=== Civil War ===
During the Civil War, he enlisted as a private in Company E, Twenty-second Regiment, Ohio Volunteer Infantry on April 14, 1861. He was appointed as an orderly sergeant and afterward was elected as the captain of his company. Hulick was discharged August 16, 1861, when the regiment's three-month term of enlistment expired.

=== Political career ===
He then served as the probate judge of Clermont County, Ohio, from 1864 to 1867 and served nine years on the board of education. He served as delegate to the Republican National Convention in 1868.

Presidential elector for Hayes/Wheeler in 1876.

Hulick was elected as a Republican to the Fifty-third and Fifty-fourth Congresses (March 4, 1893 – March 3, 1897). During his time in Congress, Hulick served on the Naval Affairs Committee. He was an unsuccessful candidate for renomination at the Sixth District Convention in 1896, which took 401 ballots to nominate his successor Seth Brown.

He then resumed the practice of law in Batavia.

=== Death ===
He died in Batavia on August 13, 1907, and was interred in Union Cemetery.

== See also ==
U.S. House of Representatives
Preceded by Dennis D. Donovan	Member of the U.S. House of Representatives from Ohio's 6th congressional district 1893–1897	Succeeded by Seth W. Brown
