= 79th Ohio Infantry Regiment =

- Active: August 1862 to June 9, 1865
- Country: United States
- Allegiance: Union
- Branch: Infantry
- Engagements: Defense of Cincinnati; Atlanta campaign; Battle of Resaca; Battle of Kennesaw Mountain; Battle of Peachtree Creek; Siege of Atlanta; Sherman's March to the Sea; Carolinas campaign; Battle of Bentonville

The 79th Ohio Infantry Regiment, sometimes 79th Ohio Volunteer Infantry (or 79th OVI) was an infantry regiment in the Union Army during the American Civil War.

== Service ==
The 79th Ohio Infantry was organized at Camp Dennison near Cincinnati, Ohio in August 1862. It was mustered in for three years service under the command of Colonel Henry Gassaway Kennett.

The regiment was attached to Ward's Brigade, 12th Division, Army of the Ohio, to November 1862. Ward's Brigade, Post of Gallatin, Tennessee, Department of the Cumberland, to June 1863. 2nd Brigade, 3rd Division, Reserve Corps, Army of the Cumberland, to August 1863. Ward's Brigade, Nashville, Tennessee, Department of the Cumberland, to January 1864. 1st Brigade, 1st Division, XI Corps, Army of the Cumberland, to April 1864. 1st Brigade, 3rd Division, XX Corps, Army of the Cumberland, to June 1865.

The 79th Ohio Infantry mustered out of service at Washington, D.C., on June 9, 1865.

== Detailed service ==
Ordered to Kentucky September 3, 1862. Advance to Crittenden, Ky., September 7. thence moved to Louisville, Ky. March to Frankfort, Ky., October 3–9, 1862. Occupation of Frankfort October 9, and duty there until October 26. Expedition to Lawrenceburg in pursuit of Morgan October 10–13. March to Bowling Green, Ky., October 26-November 4, thence to Scottsville and to Gallatin November 25, and duty there until December 11. Moved to South Tunnel December 11, and duty there until February 1, 1863. Duty at Gallatin until June 1. Moved to Lavergne June 1, thence to Murfreesboro, Tenn., July 2, and to Lavergne July 29. To Nashville, Tenn., August 19, and duty there until February 24, 1864. March to Wauhatchie Valley, Tenn., February 24-March 10, and duty there until May 2. Atlanta Campaign May 2-September 8. Demonstration on Rocky Faced Ridge May 8–11. Battle of Resaca May 14–15. Cassville May 19. Advance on Dallas May 22–25. New Hope Church May 25. Operations on line of Pumpkin Vine Creek and battles about Dallas, New Hope Church and Allatoona Hills May 25-June 5. Operations about Marietta and against Kennesaw Mountain June 10-July 2. Pine Hill June 11–14. Lost Mountain June 15–17. Golgotha or Gilgal Church June 15. Muddy Creek June 17. Noyes Creek June 19. Kolb's Farm June 22. Assault on Kennesaw June 27. Ruff's Station July 4. Chattahoochoe River July 5–17. Peachtree Creek July 19–20. Siege of Atlanta July 22-August 25. Operations at Chattahoochie River Bridge August 26-September 2. Occupation of Atlanta September 2-November 15. March to the sea November 15-December 10. Siege of Savannah December 10–21. Campaign of the Carolinas January to April 1865. Occupation of Robertsville, S.C., January 30. Lawtonville February 2. Taylor's Hole Creek, Averysboro, N. C., March 16. Battle of Bentonville March 19–21. Occupation of Goldsboro March 24. Advance on Raleigh April 10–14. Occupation of Raleigh April 14. Bennett's House April 26. Surrender of Johnston and his army. March to Washington, D.C., via Richmond, Va., April 29-May 20. Grand Review of the Armies May 24.

== Casualties ==
The regiment engaged in numerous stiff fights during the Atlanta campaign in the summer of 1864; it saw the elephant in the face of heavy fire at Resaca, was hurled against enemy fortifications at Dallas, and won and held enemy trenches at the point of the bayonet at Gilgal Church. The regiment began the campaign with 600 men, but by the time Sherman's army reached Atlanta three months later, its strength had been reduced to 175.

== Commanders ==
- Colonel Henry Gassaway Kennett – resigned August 1, 1864
- Lieutenant Colonel Azariah Doan

== Notable members ==
- Henry Clarke Corbin - Adjutant General of the U.S. Army, 1898–1904

== See also ==
- List of Ohio Civil War units
- Ohio in the Civil War
