= Lynching of Jake Davis =

- Part of Jim Crow Era
- Map of Georgia state highlighting Miller County
- Date: July 14, 1922
- Location: Miller County, Georgia
- Participants: White mob
- Deaths: Jake Davis

Jake "Shake" Davis was a 62-year-old African-American man who was lynched in Miller County, Georgia by a white mob on July 14, 1922. According to the United States Senate Committee on the Judiciary it was the 38th of 61 lynchings during 1922 in the United States.

== Background ==
Miscegenation is the interbreeding of people who are considered to be members of different races and was heavily frowned upon in America. The historical taboo surrounding white–black relationships among American whites can be seen as a historical consequence of the oppression and racial segregation of African Americans. In many U.S. states, interracial marriage was already illegal when the term miscegenation was coined in 1863. Before that, it was called "amalgamation".

Interracial relationships were heavily frowned upon and legal bans on Interracial marriages weren't struck down until the Loving v. Virginia case. This was a landmark civil rights decision of the U.S. Supreme Court in which the Court ruled, on June 12, 1967, that laws banning interracial marriage violate the Equal Protection and Due Process Clauses of the Fourteenth Amendment to the U.S. Constitution. This case was necessary as bans on interracial relationships were not repealed like other Jim Crow laws by the Civil Rights Act of 1964.

== Lynching ==
Local media reported that the well-known, 62-year-old African-American, Jake Davis had a relationship with white 26-year-old Ethel Skittel. This relationship resulted in a child. When the Miller County, Georgia community found out about this relationship a white mob gathered, seized Davis and hanged him.

After the event the Miller County Liberal wrote that "hundreds of the citizens throughout the county regret this lynching. Many have said [Ethel Skittel] was guiltier than was Jake."

== National memorial ==
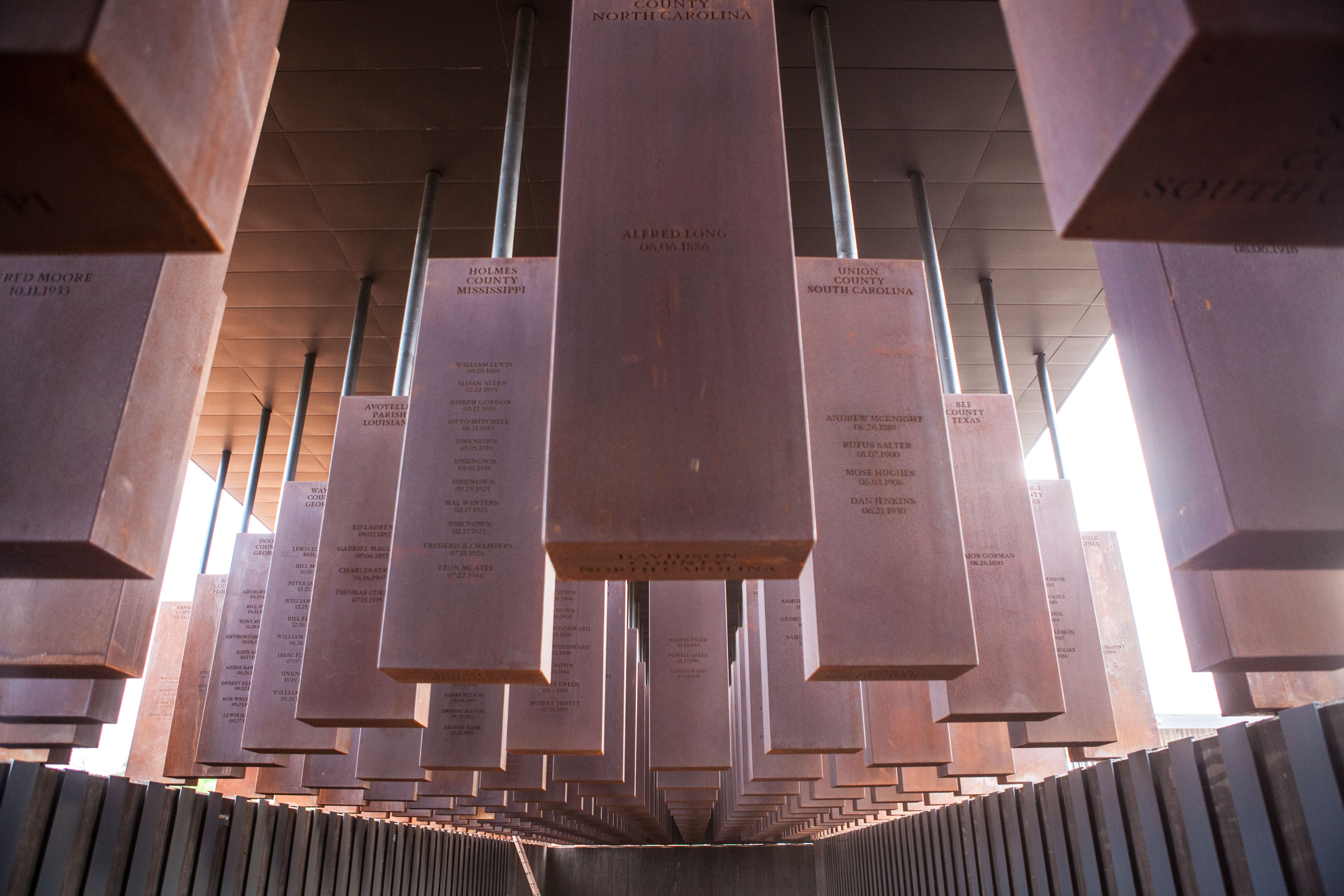
Memorial Corridor, National Memorial for Peace and Justice

The National Memorial for Peace and Justice opened in Montgomery, Alabama, on April 26, 2018. Featured among other things is the Memorial Corridor which displays 805 hanging steel rectangles, each representing the counties in the United States where a documented lynching took place and, for each county, the names of those lynched. The memorial hopes that communities, like Miller County, Georgia where Jake Davis was lynched, will take these slabs and install them in their own communities.

== See also ==
- List of lynching victims in the United States

== Bibliography ==
Notes

References

- Franzosi, Roberto; De Fazio, Gianluca; Vicari, Stefania (August 2012). "Ways of Measuring Agency: An Application of Quantitative Narrative Analysis to Lynchings in Georgia (1875—1930)". Sociological Methodology. 42. SAGE Publishing: 1–42. doi:10.1177/0081175012462370. ISSN 0081-1750. JSTOR 23409339. LCCN 68054940. OCLC 224478492. S2CID 61839342.
- Fredrickson, G. M. (2005). "Mulattoes and metis. Attitudes toward miscegenation in the United States and France since the seventeenth century". International Social Science Journal. 57 (183): 103–112. doi:10.1111/j.0020-8701.2005.00534.x.
- "Miller County Liberal". Miller County Liberal. Miller County, Georgia. July 19, 1922. OCLC 21793042.
- NPR (June 12, 2021). "June 12 Is Loving Day — When Interracial Marriage Finally Became Legal In The U.S." NPR.
- Robertson, Campbell (April 25, 2018). "A Lynching Memorial Is Opening. The Country Has Never Seen Anything Like It". The New York Times.
- Slade, Paul (2022). "White riot: a Georgia lynching". Planetslade.com.
- United States Senate Committee on the Judiciary (1926). "To Prevent and Punish the Crime of Lynching: Hearings Before the United States Senate Committee on the Judiciary, Subcommittee on S. 121, Sixty-Ninth Congress, First Session, on Feb. 16, 1926". United States Government Publishing Office.
- Yancey, George (March 22, 2007). "Experiencing Racism: Differences in the Experiences of Whites Married to Blacks and Non-Black Racial Minorities". Journal of Comparative Family Studies. 38 (2): 197–213. doi:10.3138/jcfs.38.2.197.

Number	Name	Date	Place	Method of lynching	Number of victims
1	Bill McAllister	January 8, 1922	Williamsburg, S.C.	Shot	1
2	Lincoln Hickson	January 8, 1922	Williamsburg, S.C.	Shot	1
3	Willie Jenkins	January 10, 1922	Eufaula, Alabama	Shot	1
4	Jake Brooks	January 14, 1922	Oklahoma City, Oklahoma	Hanged	1
5	Charles Strong	January 17, 1922	Mayo, Florida	Hanged	1
6	Will Bell	January 29, 1922	Pontotoc, Mississippi	Shot	1
7	Unidentified	January 29, 1922	Pontotoc, Mississippi	Shot	
8	Drew Conner (White)	January 28, 1922	Bolinger, Alabama	Burned	1
9	Will Thrasher	February 1, 1922	Crystal Springs, Mississippi	Hanged	1
10	Harry Harrison	February 2, 1922	Malvern, Arkansas	Shot	1
11	Manuel Duarte	February 2, 1922	Cameron County, Texas	Shot	1
12	P. Norman	February 11, 1922	Texarkana, Arkansas	Shot	1
13	Will Jones	February 13, 1922	Ellaville, Georgia	Shot	1
14	William Baker	March 8, 1922	Aberdeen, Mississippi	Hanged	1
15	Alfred Williams	March 12, 1922	Harlem, Georgia	Hanged	1
16	Brown Culpepper (White)	March 13, 1922	Holly Grove, Louisiana	Shot	1
17	Jerry Ingram	March 17, 1922	Crawford, Mississippi	Shot	1
18	Unidentified (white)	March 19, 1922	Okay, Oklahoma	Drowned	1
19	Alexander Smith	March 22, 1922	Gulfport, Mississippi	Hanged	1
20	Snap Curry	May 6, 1922	Kirvin, Texas	Burned	1
21	H. Varney (or Johnnie Cornish)	May 6, 1922	Kirvin, Texas	Burned	1
22	Mose Jones	May 6, 1922	Kirvin, Texas	Burned	1
23	Tom Cornish	May 8, 1922	Kirvin, Texas	Hanged	1
24	Thomas Early	May 17, 1922	Conroe, Texas	Burned	1
25	Charles Atkins	May 18, 1922	Davisboro, Georgia	Burned	1
26	Hullen Owens	May 19, 1922	Texarkana, Texas	Hanged (body burned)	1
27	Joe Winters	May 20, 1922	Conroe, Texas	Burned	1
28	Mose Bozier	May 20, 1922	Alleyton, Texas	Hanged	1
29	Gilbert Wilson	May 23, 1922	Bryan, Texas	Beaten to death	1
30	Jesse Thomas	May 26, 1922	Waco, Texas	Shot (body burned)	1
31	William Byrd	May 28, 1922	Brentwood, Georgia	Shot (body burned)	1
32	Robert Collins	June 20, 1922	Summit, Mississippi	Hanged	1
33	Warren Lewis	June 23, 1922	New Dacus, Texas	Hanged	1
34	James Harvey	July 1, 1922	Lanes Bridge, Georgia	Hanged	1
35	Joe Jordan	July 1, 1922	Lanes Bridge, Georgia	Hanged	1
36	Philip Tankard	July 5, 1922	Belhaven, North Carolina	Shot	1
37	Joe Pemberton	July 7, 1922	Benton, Louisiana	Hanged	1
38	Jake "Shake" Davis	July 14, 1922	Miller County, Georgia	Hanged	1
39	Oscar Mack	July 18, 1922	Orange County, Florida	Hanged (False report, Oscar Mack survived)	1
40	Will Anderson	July 24, 1922	Allentown, Georgia	Shot	1
41	John West	July 28, 1922	Guernsey, Arkansas	Shot	1
42	Gilbert Harris	August 1, 1922	Hot Springs, Arkansas	Hanged	1
43	John Glover	August 1, 1922	Holton,	Shot	1
44	Bayner Blackwell	August 6, 1922	Swansboro, North Carolina	Shot	1
45	John Steelman	August 23, 1922	Lambert, Mississippi	Burned	1
46	Thomas Rivers	August 30, 1922	Bossier Parish, Louisiana	Hanged	1
47	F. Watt Daniels (White)	August 1922	Mer Rouge, Louisiana	Ku-Klux Klan	1
48	Thomas F. Richards (White)	August 1922	Mer Rouge, Louisiana	Ku-Klux Klan	1
49	Jim Reed Long	September 2, 1922	Winder, Georgia	Ku-Klux Klan	1
50	O.J. Johnson	September 7, 1922	Newton, Texas	Hanged	1
51	Jim Johnston	September 28, 1922	Sandersville, Georgia	Hanged	1
52	Grover C. Everett	September 28, 1922	Abilene, Texas	Shot	1
53	John Brown	October 3, 1922	Montgomery, Alabama	Shot	1
54	Ed Hartley (white)	October 20, 1922	Camden, Tennessee	Shot	1
55	George Hartley (white)	October 20, 1922	Camden, Tennessee	Shot	1
56	Elias V. Zarate	November 11, 1922	Weslaco, Texas	Shot	1
57	Cupid Dickson / Cubrit Dixon	December 5, 1922	Madison, Florida	Shot	1
58	Charles Wright	December 8 ,1922	Perry, Florida	Burned	1
59	Less Smith	December 9, 1922	Morrilton, Arkansas	Burned	1
60	George Gay	December 11, 1922	Streetman, Texas	Hanged	1
61	Arthur Young	December 11, 1922	Perry, Florida	Hanged	1
