= List of former state routes in Ohio (142–219) =

This is a list of former state routes in Ohio since 1923 with route numbers from 142 through 219 inclusive.

== SR 142 (1923–1926) ==
State Route 142
- Location: Kerr–Hamden
- Existed: 1923–1926

SR 142 was a state route in southeastern Ohio that existed from 1923 until 1926. The route ran from Kerr, just outside Gallipolis to Hamden. After 1926, the entire route was replaced by SR 160, a route that exists today.

== SR 153 (1923–1931) ==
State Route 153
- Location: Wellsville–West Point
- Existed: 1923–1931

SR 153 was a route in Columbiana County, Ohio. The route existed from 1923 until 1931 when it became an extension of SR 45. The route ran from SR 7 in Wellsville to US 30 in West Point.

== SR 155 (1923–1926) ==
State Route 155
- Location: Sandyville–Minerva
- Existed: 1923–1926

SR 155 was a state route in Ohio between Sandyville and Minerva. The route was in existence from 1923 until 1926 when it was replaced by SR 80 which had been extended south. Today, SR 183 follows the entire route of the former SR 155.

== SR 156 ==
State Route 156
- Location: Nashport–Muskingum Township
- Existed: 1923–1962

SR 156 was a 6-mile-long (9.7 km) state highway in Muskingum County, Ohio. The route's eastern terminus had always been in Muskingum Township at SR 77 (now SR 60). At the time of its first designation in 1923, the route began east of Hanover in Licking County at SR 16. By 1930, SR 146 was extended from its former end in Zanesville to SR 16 leaving SR 156 to begin near Nashport. After being fully paved in 1946, the route would not experience any other changes until the route was deleted after 1962. Today, the road exists as Creamery Road, also known as Muskingum County Road 500.

Browse numbered routes
| ← SR 155 | OH | → SR 157 |

== SR 157 ==
State Route 157
- Location: Union Township
- Existed: 1923–1958

SR 157 was a state route in the vicinity of Buckeye Lake. First designated in 1923, the route ran from the point at which SR 79 currently ends at SR 37 on the Licking–Fairfield County line west of Buckeye Lake to US 40 (originally SR 1) near Hebron. No major changes would occur to the routing until the entire designation was removed around 1959. Most of the former route within Buckeye Lake and west of the village became (and still is) SR 79 while the balance of the route outside of the village is today known as Licking County Road 489.

Browse numbered routes
| ← SR 156 | OH | → SR 158 |

== SR 160 (1923–1926) ==
State Route 160
- Location: London–Delaware
- Existed: 1923–1926

SR 160 was a route in central Ohio that followed what is now US 42 between the cities of London and Delaware. The route existed from 1923 until 1926 when it was replaced in whole by US 42.

== SR 177 (1923–1926) ==
State Route 177
- Location: East Union Township–Orrville
- Existed: 1923–1926

SR 177 was a route that briefly existed in Wayne County from 1923 until 1925. The route served as a shortcut to and from Orrville and Wooster. After its deletion by 1926, the route was replaced by county roads.

== SR 177 (1926) ==
State Route 177
- Location: Washington Township
- Existed: 1926–1926

SR 177 was a short-lived state route in a now former section Washington Township, Lucas County. The route started at SR 6 (Detroit Avenue) north of the Toledo city limits and traveled due north along Crabb Road and Telegraph Road to the Michigan state line. The route only existed in 1926 before it was replaced by US 24.

== SR 177 (1927–1932) ==
State Route 177
- Location: Goshen Township–New Philadelphia
- Existed: 1927–1932

SR 177 was a route Tuscarawas County that existed from 1927 until 1932. It began in Goshen Township at SR 259 and headed north west towards New Philadelphia. By 1933, SR 16 took over the entire length of the route and today it is designated SR 416.

== SR 178 ==
State Route 178
- Location: Franklin Township–Plymouth
- Existed: 1923–1959

SR 178 was a state highway in Richland County connecting Franklin Township at SR 13 and Plymouth at SR 61 and SR 98. First designated in 1923, the route traveled north-northwest from its southern terminus towards Ganges and Shiloh. In the area of Shiloh, the route headed in a more northwesterly direction towards Plymouth. In the center of the town, the route ended. Throughout its history, no major changes occurred to its routing. After 1959, the segment between SR 13 and Shiloh was removed from the state highway system while SR 603, which originally had its western terminus at SR 178 near Shiloh, was extended over the remainder of the route to Plymouth. The former state-maintained section of the route is now known as Richland County Road 207 (Ganges-Five Points Road).

Browse numbered routes
| ← SR 177 | OH | → SR 179 |

== SR 180 (1923–1926) ==
State Route 180
- Location: Savannah–Fitchville
- Existed: 1923–1926

SR 180 was a short north-south state highway in Ohio that was in existence from 1923 until 1926. The route's southern terminus was in the village of Savannah at SR 60 and its northern terminus was at SR 30 (now SR 13) in Fitchville. In 1927, SR 180 was deleted when SR 6 was extended north. Today, the route is a part of US 250.

== SR 182 ==
State Route 182
- Location: Upper Sandusky–Nevada
- Length: 7.97 mi (12.83 km)
- Existed: 1923–c. 2005

SR 182 was a state highway that existed from 1923 until about 2005. The route served as an alternate route of US 30 between Upper Sandusky and Bucyrus. From 1923 until 1969, the route stretched between Upper Sandusky at US 30N (originally SR 5) to US 30N at a point between Oceola and Bucyrus. By 1971, the route's eastern terminus was moved to SR 231 in the village of Nevada. SR 182 was removed from the state highway system between 2005 and 2007, around the time the nearby US 30 expressway was completed between Upper Sandusky and Bucyrus.

== SR 183 (1923–1951) ==
State Route 183
- Location: Toledo
- Existed: 1923–1951

SR 183 was a state route in Lucas County, at the time northwest of the city limits of Toledo. For most of its history, the route began at SR 246 (Dorr Street) near Ottawa Hills and headed due north along Secor Road. Near the Michigan state line, the route made a turn to the left onto Whiteford Center Road before ending at the border. At the time of its first designation in 1923 and 1924, SR 183 started in western Toledo, headed west on Dorr Street and then turned north onto its routing as previously described. For the next two years, the route started near Maumee and traveled north along Byrne Road to the point of its long-time southern terminus. By 1947, most of the route became co-signed with Bypass US 23-24-25. After 1951, SR 183 was deleted and most of the route became signed solely as the bypass route. Today, most of the road exists as a municipally-maintained road as Toledo annexed the surrounding land including all of the areas through which the former SR 183 ran.

== SR 184 (1923–1941) ==
State Route 184
- Location: Grand Rapids–Tontogany
- Existed: 1923–1941

SR 184 was a state highway in western Wood County. The route, which existed from 1923 until 1941, was an east-west road that started at SR 65 (originally SR 110) near Grand Rapids to SR 64 east of Tontogany. After 1941, the entire route became an extension of SR 110 to Bowling Green. However, after the road of the former SR 183 was downgraded to a county highway, the road today exists as Wood County Road 184 (Kellogg Road).

== SR 185 (1923–1926) ==
State Route 185
- Location: McClure
- Existed: 1923–1926

SR 185 was a short state route in northern Henry County that existed from 1923 until 1926. For the first three years of the route, SR 185 started just north of McClure at SR 34 and SR 65 and had its northern terminus at SR 110 near the banks of the Maumee River. For the last year of its existence, the southern terminus was moved to the center of McClure when SR 34 and SR 65 were moved to a different alignment through northern Henry County. Within one year, the route was deleted and the road SR 185 occupied became a new alignment of SR 65.

== SR 185 (1927–1937) ==
State Route 185
- Location: Old Fort–Bellevue
- Existed: 1927–1937

SR 185 was a state route that existed from 1927 until 1937. For most of its history, the route was a five-mile-long (8.0 km) connector between SR 101 south of Clyde to US 20 west of Bellevue. In 1937, SR 185 was extended west along previously unnumbered highways through Green Springs to end at SR 53 near Old Fort. This extension was short-lived as within the year, an extended SR 113 was routed over the entire route of SR 185.

== SR 187 (1923–1930) ==
State Route 187
- Location: Leipsic–McComb
- Existed: 1923–1930

SR 187 was a state highway that served as a 11-mile-long (18 km) connector between Leipsic and McComb. The route existed from 1923 until 1930 when it was replaced by SR 113 as it was being extended east through the state.

== SR 188 (1923–1926) ==
State Route 188
- Location: Greensburg Township–Holgate
- Existed: 1923–1926

SR 188 was a state route in Putnam and Henry Counties in northwestern Ohio. First designated in 1923, the route started at SR 22 (now SR 15) in Greensburg Township, traveled north through Miller City and ended in downtown Holgate. This would be the routing of SR 188 throughout its three-year history, but after 1926, the entire route became a part of SR 33. Today, all of former SR 188 is the southernmost part of SR 108.

== SR 192 ==
State Route 192
- Location: Bryan–Springfield Township
- Existed: 1923–1955

SR 192 was an eight-mile-long (13 km) route in Williams County, located in the northwest corner of Ohio. The route was designated in 1923 along the route of the former SR 456, a route first signed in 1914. SR 192 started in Bryan, traveled east southeast through Pulaski Township before turning to due east and ending at SR 191 in Springfield Township. After 1953, the route was deleted from the state highway system. When SR 192 was deleted, the road outside of the Bryan city limits became Williams County Road 456, an ode to the route number from the 1910s.

Browse numbered routes
| ← SR 191 | OH | → SR 193 |

== SR 193 (1923–1938) ==
State Route 193
- Location: Hicksville
- Existed: 1923–1938

SR 193 was a short connector in and around Hicksville created in 1923. The route began at the Indiana state line where the road continues west as SR 8 and traveled southeast for about three miles (4.8 km) to end in downtown Hicksville at SR 2 and SR 18. After 1937, the entire route became a part of SR 18 when it was moved off of the SR 2 concurrency west of the village.

== SR 194 (1923–1926) ==
State Route 194
- Location: Payne–Paulding
- Existed: 1923–1926

SR 194 was a short state highway connecting the villages of Payne and Paulding from 1923 until 1926. The route had always been an unpaved dirt road throughout its short history. After 1926, the road was demoted to a county road but in 1937, the former SR 194 became a part of the state highway system again as a part of SR 500.

== SR 194 (1927–1969) ==
State Route 194
- Location: Willard
- Length: 4.13 mi (6.65 km)
- Existed: 1927–1969

SR 194 was a state highway in Huron County in the vicinity of Willard. Created in 1927, it ran east from the intersection of SR 99 and Tiffin Street east of Willard through New Haven Township to end at SR 61. Around 1933, the route was extended slightly to the west to head through downtown Willard on Tiffin Street and south along Main Street to end at SR 17 (later US 224) bringing the total length of the highway to 4.13 miles (6.65 km). By 1969, SR 194 (and SR 298 which itself ended at SR 194's western terminus) would be replaced by an extension of SR 103.

== SR 199 (1923) ==
State Route 199
- Location: Dawn
- Existed: 1923–1923

SR 199 was the short-lived designation for what is now SR 242 in Darke County. Numbered SR 199 in 1923 after being designated SR 464 for about nine years, the route was renumbered to SR 242 within one year of SR 199's designation.

== SR 200 (1923–1931) ==
State Route 200
- Location: Liberty Township–Neave Township
- Existed: 1923–1931

SR 200 was a state highway entirely in Darke County and in existence from 1923 until 1931. The route started at the Indiana state line in Liberty Township and traveled east through Palestine before ending at SR 121 in Neave Township. In 1932, US 36 was designated in Ohio and replaced the entire route of SR 200.

== SR 200 (1932–1936) ==
State Route 200
- Location: Lagrange–Belden
- Existed: 1932–1936

SR 200 was a short spur connecting the village of Lagrange to SR 57 in the community of Belden. The route was designated in 1932 along county roads and replaced in 1936 by an extension of SR 303.

== SR 200 (1938) ==
State Route 200
- Location: Medina–Parma
- Existed: 1938–1938

SR 200 was a short-lived alternate route of SR 3 between Medina and Parma that existed in 1938. SR 200 followed what had been SR 3 prior to 1938 while SR 3 was routed along US 42. Within one year, SR 3 moved back to its original alignment and SR 200 was therefore deleted.

== SR 207 (1923–1937) ==
State Route 207
- Location: Hanover–Fallsbury Township
- Existed: 1923–1937

SR 207 was a state route in eastern Licking County. The route was created in 1923 and followed the same alignment throughout its history. SR 207 began along SR 16 just west of Hanover and traveled northeast until reaching Perryton. At that point, the route turned in a more northerly direction and ended at SR 79 in Fallsbury Township. After 1937, the entire route became a northern extension of SR 668 and remained a part of that route until 1959. Today, all of the former SR 207 outside of the Hanover village limits is a part of Licking County Road 668.

== SR 210 (1923–1953) ==
State Route 210
- Location: Roscoe
- Existed: 1923–1953

SR 210 was a bypass of SR 16 in the vicinity of Coshocton. While SR 16 crossed the Muskingum River into downtown Coshocton, SR 210 traveled along the west bank of the river to end at SR 271 (now SR 541) in the community of Roscoe. The route was in existence from 1923 until 1953 when SR 16 was rerouted onto the entire length of SR 210.

Browse numbered routes
| ← SR 209 | OH | → SR 211 |

== SR 214 ==
State Route 214
- Location: Blaine–Bellaire
- Existed: 1923–1978

SR 214 was a route in northeastern Belmont County that existed from 1923 until 1978. The route started at an intersection with US 40 in Richland Township and headed southeast. After the completion of I-70, there was an interchange with SR 214 (exit 221) within intersection with US 40. SR 214 followed the top of a ridge while traveling through Richland and Pultney Townships before starting its descent into Bellaire. Instead of taking the direct route into downtown Bellaire on Central Street, SR 214 took a more winding route in order to have an easier descent into the village. The route ended at the intersection of Central Street and Noble Street in Bellaire. At the time, SR 7 was routed along Noble north of here and Central for one block east of this point.

The route had not changed its alignment during the time it was a state route. After the route was deleted from the state highway system, most of the route outside of Bellaire became Belmont County Road 214. Parts of SR 214 within downtown Bellaire became a part of the 1979 extension of SR 149 into Bellaire though SR 149 has since moved to a different alignment south of the village. Since the redesignation of the road to CR 214, an interchange with I-470 (exit 3) opened.

Browse numbered routes
| ← SR 213 | OH | → SR 215 |

== SR 219 (1923–1924) ==
State Route 219
- Location: Rome Township
- Existed: 1923–1924

SR 219 was a short-lived three-mile-long (4.8 km) alternate route to SR 7 in southern Rome Township, Lawrence County. The route existed from 1923 until 1924 before being replaced by an eastern extension of SR 243. Today, the route is no longer a part of the state highway system; SR 243 was truncated its intersection with SR 7 between Chesapeake and Proctorville and SR 7 was moved onto a bypass of the area.
