= Ohio State Route 211 =

State highway in Tuscarawas County, Ohio, US

State Route 211

Route information
- Maintained by ODOT
- Length: 1.23 mi (1.98 km)
- Existed: 1923–present

Major junctions
- West end: SR 39 in Dover
- East end: SR 800 in Dover

Location
- Country: United States
- State: Ohio
- Counties: Tuscarawas

Highway system
- Ohio State Highway System; Interstate; US; State; Scenic
← SR 210	→ SR 212

State Route 211 (SR 211) is a 1.23-mile-long (1.98 km) north–south state highway in the eastern portion of the U.S. state of Ohio. Though physically it runs in a northwesterly–southeasterly direction, according to the Ohio Department of Transportation (ODOT) and signage on the route itself its southern terminus is located north of its northern terminus. The unusual directional signage is a vestige of when SR 211 traveled further south acting as a bypass of New Philadelphia and Dover. The highway runs from its signed southern terminus at a signalized intersection with SR 39 on the border of the city of Dover and Dover Township, just one block east of exit 83 off the Interstate 77 (I-77)/U.S. Route 250 (US 250) freeway, to its signed northern terminus at a signalized intersection with SR 800 near downtown Dover.

== Route description ==
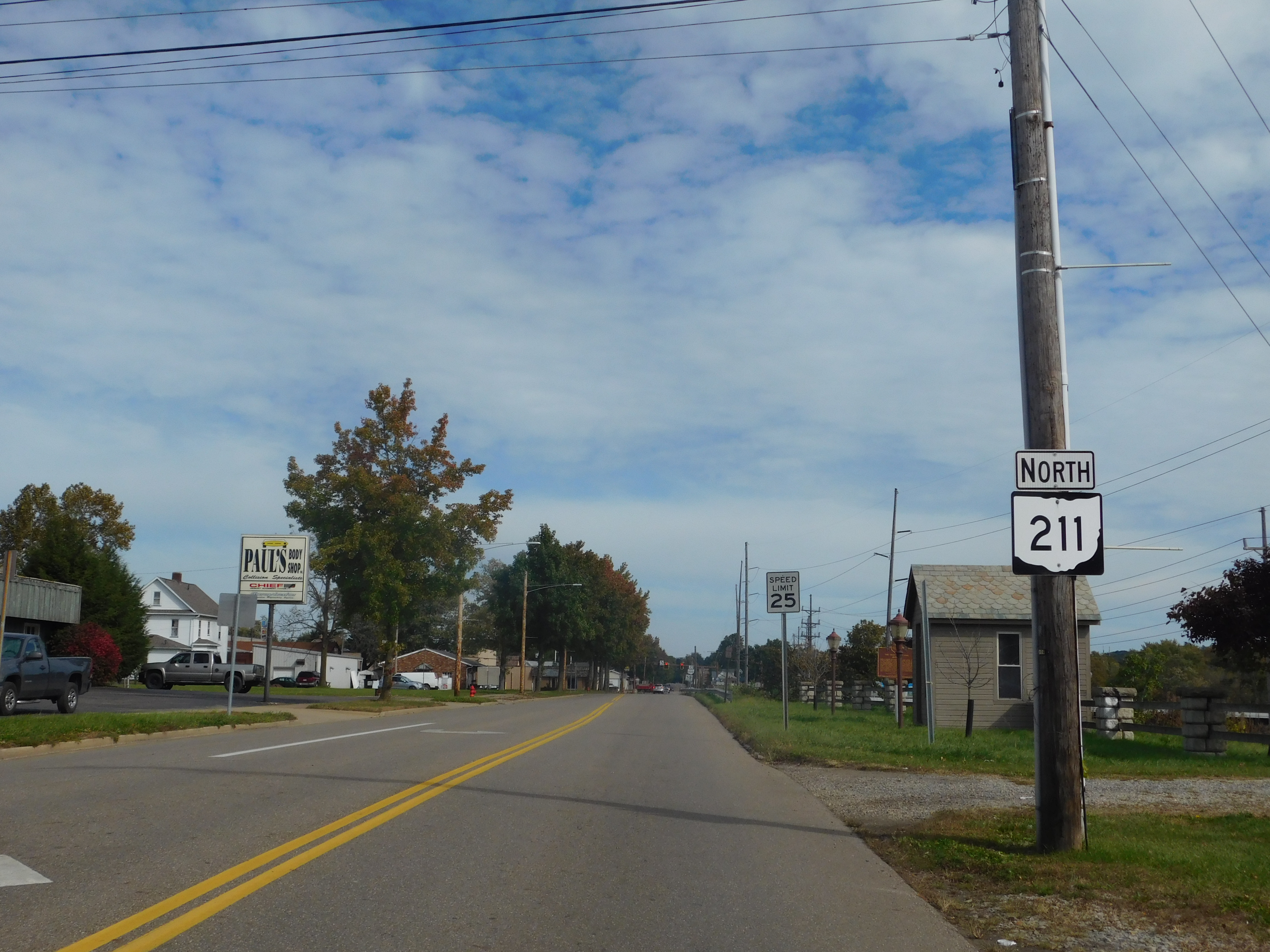
SR 211 northbound in Dover, approaching SR 800

SR 211 almost runs entirely within Dover in central Tuscarawas County. The highway begins at an intersection with SR 39 in Dover Township, about 200 feet (60 m) east of its interchange with I-77 and US 250. This intersection is surrounded by numerous commercial businesses including gas stations and fast food restaurants as a part of its closeness to the Interstate. It heads east and after crossing into the city and an R.J. Corman railroad at-grade, SR 211 follows Tuscarawas Avenue towards the southeast through a residential neighborhood of Dover. In addition to houses, it passes numerous churches, small businesses, and schools (including Tuscarawas Central Catholic High School and Dover High School). Before crossing the Tuscarawas River, SR 211 turns left to head northeast on Front Street for three blocks. At Wooster Street, SR 211 ends at a signalized intersection with SR 800. SR 800 heads to the southeast on Wooster Street over the river and northeast on Front Street.

The route is two-lanes in width for its entire route with the exception of turning lanes at some intersections and a center turn lane between SR 39 and Slingloff Avenue. SR 211 is not included as a part of the National Highway System.

== History ==
Since it was created in 1923, SR 211 has existed in the Dover vicinity. However, the original routing is much different than how it runs today. In 1923, SR 211 traveled from SR 20 later US 21 (now the intersection of SR 39 and Stonecreek Road) east of New Philadelphia north along the west banks of the Tuscarawas River and Sugar Creek before crossing Sugar Creek into Dover on Third Street ending at Tuscarawas Street (at the time carrying SR 39). In 1937, the route was extended south along the Tuscarawas River's bank to the community of South Side at SR 16 (the community is now a southern annexation of New Philadelphia and the intersecting state highway is now SR 416). The entire road was a dirt road until 1941 when the portion south of US 21 became a gravel road and an asphalt road to the north.

Around 1964, with the construction of I-77 commencing, SR 39 was relocated to bypass downtown Dover to the west. It was routed to travel on SR 211 north of US 21 leaving SR 211 only on the portion between SR 16 and US 21. Within a couple of years, US 250's relocation onto a freeway bypassing New Philadelphia obliterated the surface road between SR 16 and US 21 leading to the temporary retirement of the SR 211 designation. The designation resurfaced around 1971 when a state-maintained road connecting SR 39 and SR 800 was created in Dover, partly along what was previously SR 39. The route has not experienced any reroutings since the second designation.

== Major intersections ==
The entire route is in Dover, Tuscarawas County.

mi	km	Destinations	Notes
0.00	0.00	SR 39 to I-77 / US 250 – Uhrichsville, Marietta, Canton, Wooster	
1.23	1.98	SR 800 (Wooster Avenue / East Front Street)	
1.000 mi = 1.609 km; 1.000 km = 0.621 mi
