= Ohio State Route 800 =

State highway in eastern Ohio, US

State Route 800
- SR 800 highlighted in red

Route information
- Maintained by ODOT
- Length: 110.69 mi (178.14 km)
- Existed: 1969–present

Major junctions
- South end: SR 7 in Jackson Township
- I-70 / US 40 in Hendrysburg; US 22 near Smyrna; US 250 from Dennison to New Philadelphia; US 36 at Uhrichsville
- North end: I-77 in Canton

Location
- Country: United States
- State: Ohio
- Counties: Monroe, Belmont, Guernsey, Harrison, Tuscarawas, Stark

Highway system
- Ohio State Highway System; Interstate; US; State; Scenic
← SR 799	→ SR 807

State Route 800 (SR 800) is a north–south state highway in the eastern portion of the U.S. state of Ohio. Its southern terminus is at SR 7 in Jackson Township near New Matamoras, and its northern terminus is at its interchange with Interstate 77 in Canton.

Prior to 1969, SR 800 was part of SR 8. At that time, SR 8 between Akron and Canton was eliminated. The portion south of Canton was renumbered to SR 800.

== History ==
Most of SR 800 was first designated in 1923 as SR 48 south of Dennison and SR 8 north of Dennison. By 1927, the road from Fly to Dennison became a southern extension of SR 8. Except for a realignment onto the US 250 expressway between Dennison and New Philadelphia in the 1960s, no major changes to the routing of SR 8 occurred between 1927 and 1969.

In May 1968, the Ohio Department of Highways (predecessor to Ohio Department of Transportation) proposed the renumbering of SR 8 to SR 800. The renumbering took place to avoid long conflicts with the newly constructed Interstate Highway System in Ohio. SR 800 signs began appearing along the road in February 1969 with a six-month transition allowing for the removal of old SR 8 signs. The renumbering coincided with the renumbering of a section of SR 16 in the New Philadelphia area (it became SR 416). Except for a realignment of the route around the north side of Dennison by 1979, no other changes have occurred to SR 800's routing.

== Major intersections ==
County	Location	mi	km	Destinations	Notes
Monroe	Jackson Township	0.00	0.00	SR 7 – Clarington, Marietta	
Monroe	Center Township	14.55	23.42	SR 255 east – Laings, Sardis	Western terminus of SR 255
Monroe	Center Township	15.46	24.88	SR 26 south – Graysville, Marietta	Southern end of SR 26 concurrency
Monroe	Woodsfield	17.77	28.60	SR 78 (Court Street) – Caldwell, Lewisville, Clarington	
Monroe	Woodsfield	17.92	28.84	SR 26 north (North Main Street) / North Street – Jerusalem	Northern end of SR 26 concurrency
Monroe	Malaga Township	25.16	40.49	SR 145 – Miltonsburg, Lewisville, Jerusalem, Beallsville	
Belmont	Warren Township	33.48	53.88	SR 148 east / Water Works Road / Burkhart Road – Armstrong Mills, Powhatan Point	Western terminus of SR 148
Belmont	Barnesville	35.82	57.65	SR 147 west (Leatherwood Pike)	Southern end of SR 147 concurrency
Belmont	Barnesville	36.25	58.34	SR 147 east (Main Street)	Northern end of SR 147 concurrency
Belmont	Kirkwood Township	41.87– 42.08	67.38– 67.72	I-70 / US 40 – Wheeling, WV, Columbus	Exit 202 (I-70)
Guernsey	Londonderry Township	53.56	86.20	US 22 west – Cambridge	Southern end of US 22 concurrency
Harrison	Freeport Township	54.17	87.18	US 22 east – Cadiz	Northern end of US 22 concurrency
Harrison	Freeport	57.48	92.51	SR 342 west (Main Street) / Philadelphia Street – West Chester	Eastern terminus of SR 342
Harrison	Freeport Township	59.12	95.14	SR 799 east (Clendening Lake Road) – Tappan Lake Park, Clendening Lake	Western terminus of SR 799
Tuscarawas	Rush Township	68.07	109.55	SR 258 west – West Chester	Eastern terminus of SR 258
Tuscarawas	Union Township	75.18	120.99	US 250 east – Cadiz	Southern end of US 250 concurrency
Tuscarawas	Mill Township	75.75	121.91	North 2nd Street – Dennison	Interchange
Tuscarawas	Uhrichsville	76.55	123.20	US 36 west / North Water Street – Gnadenhutten, Newcomerstown, Uhrichsville	Interchange; eastern terminus of US 36
Tuscarawas	Uhrichsville	77.22	124.27	Southern end of freeway	
Tuscarawas	Midvale	79.74	128.33	CR 68 (Barnhill Road) – Midvale, Barnhill	
Tuscarawas	Goshen Township	81.49	131.15	US 250 Bus. / SR 259 (East High Avenue / Reiser Avenue) / CR 62 – Schoenbrunn	
Tuscarawas	Goshen Township	83.62	134.57	US 250 west / SR 416 south (South Broadway Street) – Wooster, Tuscarawas	Northern end of US 250 concurrency; southern end of SR 416 concurrency
Tuscarawas	Goshen Township	83.62	134.57	Northern end of freeway	
Tuscarawas	New Philadelphia	84.85	136.55	US 250 Bus. east / SR 39 east (East High Avenue) / SR 416 north (North Broadway Street)	Northern end of SR 416 concurrency; southern end of US 250 Bus. / SR 39 concurrency
Tuscarawas	New Philadelphia	85.20	137.12	US 250 Bus. west / SR 39 west (West High Avenue) to 4th Street SW / I-77	Northern end of US 250 Bus. / SR 39 concurrency
Tuscarawas	Dover	87.99	141.61	SR 211 south (West Front Street) to North Wooster Avenue / I-77	Northern terminus of SR 211
Tuscarawas	Dover Township	90.75	146.05	SR 416 south – New Philadelphia	Northern terminus of SR 416
Tuscarawas	Fairfield Township	94.79	152.55	SR 212 west – Zoar	Southern end of SR 212 concurrency
Tuscarawas	Sandy Township	95.19	153.19	SR 212 east – Sherrodsville	Northern end of SR 212 concurrency
Tuscarawas	Sandy Township	99.97	160.89	SR 183 east / CR 108 (Cross Roads Road) – Minerva, Sandyville	Western terminus of SR 183
Stark	Canton	109.96– 110.14	176.96– 177.25	I-77 / Cleveland Avenue SW – Downtown Canton, Marietta	Exit 103 (I-77); access to I-77 south via Cleveland Avenue SW and Bolivar Road SW
1.000 mi = 1.609 km; 1.000 km = 0.621 mi: Concurrency terminus
