= List of former state routes in Ohio (1–49) =

This is a list of former state routes in Ohio since 1923 with route numbers from 1 through 49 inclusive.

== SR 1 (1912–1926) ==
State Route 1
- Location: New Paris–Bridgeport
- Existed: 1912–1926

SR 1, formerly known as Inter-county Highway 1 until 1921 and State Highway 1 in 1922, was the designation for the National Road and National Old Trails Road through central Ohio between 1912 and 1926. US 40 was first signed along the length of the route in 1926 and became the road's only designation by 1927.

== SR 1 (1961–1965) ==
State Route 1
- Location: Cincinnati-Conneaut
- Existed: 1961–1965

SR 1 was the designation for a proposed toll road connecting Cincinnati and Pennsylvania that existed between 1961 and 1965. As the freeway portions were not built yet, SR 1 was routed along local roads until a corresponding freeway section was completed. SR 1 generally followed what is now I-75 between Cincinnati and Dayton, SR 4 between Dayton and Fairborn, US 40 and I-70 between Fairborn and Columbus, I-71 between Columbus and Cleveland, and I-90 between Cleveland and the Pennsylvania state line at Conneaut.

== SR 5 (1923–1931) ==
State Route 5
- Location: Delphos-Wooster
- Existed: 1923–1931

SR 5 was the designation for what is now current routing of US 30 across Ohio. When it was first designated in 1923, SR 5 ran from the Indiana state line in Benton Township to the West Virginia state line in East Liverpool. In 1927, following the designation of US 30, the long segments of SR 5 that overlapped US 30 were removed leaving the section between Delphos and Wooster, Ohio, though it did overlap US 42 between Mansfield and Ashland, what was then SR 6 (now US 250) between Ashland and Plain Township, and US 30 to Wooster. The route was truncated at its eastern end to Mansfield by 1929 removing the additional overlaps. By 1932, SR 5 became part of the newly designated northern alternate route of US 30, US 30N.

== SR 6 (1923–1926) ==
State Route 6
- Location: Cincinnati-Toledo
- Existed: 1923–1926

SR 6 was the route of what became US 25 through western Ohio connecting Cincinnati and Toledo, Ohio at the Michigan state line between 1923 and 1926.

== SR 6 (1927–1928) ==
State Route 6
- Location: Bridgeport-Norwalk
- Existed: 1927–1928

SR 6 was the route of is now US 250 between Bridgeport and Norwalk for two years from 1927 to 1928.

== SR 6 (1929-1931) ==
State Route 6
- Location: Cleveland-Painesville
- Existed: 1929–1931

SR 6 was the designation for what is now SR 283 between Cleveland and Painesville along the Lake Erie shoreline. The route existed between 1929 and 1931 following the route's former designation of SR 175 but was renumbered due to the addition of US 6 in the state.

== SR 9 (1923-1930) ==
State Route 9
- Location: Cincinnati-Pioneer
- Existed: 1923–1930

SR 9 was the route of what is now U.S. Route 127 in Ohio between Cincinnati and Bryan and SR 15 between Bryan and the Michigan state line near Pioneer.

== SR 10 (1923-1926) ==
State Route 10
- Location: Delphos-Plain Township
- Existed: 1923–1926

SR 10 was the route that follows what is now SR 309 between Delphos and Ontario and US 30 between Ontario and the community of Jefferson (within Plain Township, Wayne County) at what was SR 5. The route existed from 1923 until 1926 when it was replaced by US 30.

== SR 10 (1927-1931) ==
State Route 10
- Location: Washington Court House-Zanesville
- Existed: 1927–1931

SR 10 was the route that replaced SR 40 in 1927 due to the designation of US 40. The route ran from Washington Court House to Zanesville by way of Circleville and Lancaster. By 1932, US 22 was extended from its previous terminus in Cambridge to Cincinnati taking over all of SR 10.

== SR 10 (1932) ==
State Route 10
- Location: Aberdeen-Toledo
- Existed: 1932–1932

SR 10 was a short-lived designation for the road that became US 68 in 1932. The entire route was concurrent with other routes for its entire length: with US 52 and US 62 between Aberdeen and Ripley, completely concurrent with SR 221 to Georgetown (SR 221 had been moved to its current alignment within one year), SR 53 to Kenton, SR 31 to Findlay, US 25 to Perrysburg, and US 23 for the remainder to Toledo.

== SR 11 (1923–1935) ==
State Route 11
- Location: Gallipolis–New Paris
- Existed: 1923–1935

SR 11 was the designation that now carries US 35 through Ohio. It existed from 1923 through 1935.

== SR 13 (1923–1926) ==
State Route 13
- Location: Bridgeport-Cleveland
- Existed: 1923–1926

SR 13 was the route that carries US 250 between Bridgeport and Dover and US 21 from Dover to Cleveland. The two U.S. routes replaced the three-year-old SR 13 in 1926.

== SR 15 (1912–1926) ==
State Route 15
- Location: Cleveland–Williamsfield
- Existed: 1912–1926

SR 15, formerly known as Inter-county Highway 15 until 1921 and State Highway 15 in 1922,' was an original state route that traveled between Cleveland and the Pennsylvania state line near Williamsfield. The entire length of the route became US 322 in 1926.

== SR 16 (1923–1926) ==
State Route 16
- Location: Cleveland–Coitsville Township
- Existed: 1923–1926

SR 16 was the route that ran along modern-day US 422 between Cleveland and Coitsville Township at the Pennsylvania state line (east of Youngstown). The route existed from 1923 and 1926. Unlike US 422, SR 16 traveled through Niles with SR 169 bypassed the city.

== SR 17 (1923–1933) ==
State Route 17
- Location: Harrison Township–Lowellville
- Existed: 1923–1933

SR 17 was a route that existed between 1923 and 1935. Prior to 1926, SR 17 started at the Indiana state line near Hicksville and traveled east across Ohio (mostly along modern-day SR 18 between Hicksville and Tiffin and US 224 east of there) before ending at the Pennsylvania state line near Lowellville. In 1927, the route was changed to follow what is now the entirety of US 224 through Ohio. SR 17 was removed in favor of US 224 in 1933.

== SR 19 (1923–1931) ==
State Route 19
- Location: Columbus–Masury
- Existed: 1923–1931

SR 19 carried what is now mostly US 62 between Columbus and the Pennsylvania state line near Masury. It existed from 1923 through 1931.

== SR 20 (1923–1931) ==
State Route 20
- Location: Columbus–East Liverpool
- Existed: 1923–1926

SR 20 was a route that ran from Columbus to East Liverpool by way of Newark, Coshocton, and New Philadelphia. The modern route of SR 20 consists of SR 16 from Columbus to Coshocton, the former US 36 between Coshocton and Newcomerstown, the old US 21 between Newcomerstown and New Philadelphia, and SR 39 from New Philadelphia to East Liverpool. The route existed from 1923 to 1926.

== SR 21 (1923–1926) ==
State Route 21
- Location: Columbus–Findlay
- Existed: 1923–1926

SR 21 ran from Columbus to Findlay between 1923 and 1926. In 1926, the route was renumbered to SR 31 due to the addition of US 21 in the eastern part of the state. Today, the route consists of the old routing of US 33 between Columbus and Marysville, SR 31 between Marysville and Kenton, and US 68 to Findlay.

== SR 22 (1923–1926) ==
State Route 22
- Location: Marion–Indiana state line
- Existed: 1923–1926

SR 22 was a route that ran from Marion to the Indiana state line in Van Wert County between 1923 and 1926. In 1926, the route was renumbered to US 23 from Marion to Carey, SR 15 between Carey and Ney, and the entire length of SR 249.

== SR 23 (1923–1926) ==
State Route 23
- Location: Columbia–Lacarne
- Existed: 1923–1926

SR 23 was a route in northwestern Ohio that existed between 1923 and 1926. Today, the route runs along US 20 from the Indiana state line to northwestern Toledo, SR 120 through Toledo, and SR 2 from Toledo to its intersection with SR 163 between Lacarne and Port Clinton.

== SR 24 (1923–1926) ==
State Route 24
- Location: Hillsboro–Pomeroy
- Existed: 1923–1926

SR 24 was the designation for what became SR 124 through southern Ohio between Hillsboro and Pomeroy. The route existed from 1923 to 1926.

== SR 25 (1923–1926) ==
State Route 25
- Location: Cincinnati–Friendship
- Existed: 1923–1926

SR 25 was the designation for what became SR 125 through southern Ohio between Cincinnati and Friendship at what was then SR 7 (now US 52). The route was in existence from 1923 to 1926.

== SR 27 (1923–1926) ==
State Route 27
- Location: Cincinnati–Logan
- Existed: 1923–1926

SR 27 was the designation of a route in southern Ohio from 1923 through 1926. The route now consists of US 50 from Cincinnati to Milford, SR 28 from Milford to Chillicothe, SR 159 north of Chillicothe, SR 180 to Enterprise, and US 33 into Logan.

== SR 28 (1923–1926) ==
State Route 28
- Location: Cincinnati–West Jefferson
- Existed: 1923–1926

SR 28 was the state highway that traveled between Cincinnati and West Jefferson. It existed from 1923 to 1926 and was replaced in 1926 by US 42 from Cincinnati to London, and SR 142 for the remainder of the route.

== SR 30 (1923–1926) ==
State Route 30
- Location: Chauncey–Sandusky
- Existed: 1923–1926

SR 30 was a north-south state highway that nearly crossed the length of Ohio. The route existed from 1923 through 1926 and was replaced by SR 13 that year. Most of the route from Chauncey to Milan still follows SR 13 except for the section north of Milan, now US 250 carries the former route into Sandusky.

== SR 31 (1923–1926) ==
State Route 31
- Location: Antwerp–Toledo
- Existed: 1923–1926

SR 31 was the route that became US 24 between the Indiana state line near Antwerp to downtown Toledo. The route existed from 1923 through 1926.

== SR 32 (1923–1937) ==
State Route 32
- Location: Washington Township–Marysville
- Existed: 1923–1937

SR 32 was the designation for the route that generally follows what is now SR 29 from the Indiana state line near Wabash (within Washington Township, Mercer County) to St. Marys and US 33 from there to Marysville. The route passed through Celina, St. Marys, Wapakoneta, Russells Point, Bellefontaine, and Marysville during the route's existence from 1923 through 1937.

== SR 33 ==
State Route 33
- Location: Lima–Chesterfield Township
- Existed: 1923–1937

SR 33 was the predecessor to SR 108 in northwestern Ohio. From its first designation in 1923 through 1929, the route started in Lima and traveled north through Ottawa, Napoleon, and Wauseon before ending at the Michigan state line in rural Chesterfield Township, Fulton County. By 1930, the route's southern end had been truncated to Ottawa (the former route south of there became SR 65). The route would exist in this configuration for another seven years before being renumbered to SR 108 due to the addition of US 33.

== SR 35 ==
State Route 35
- Location: Malaga–Salem
- Existed: 1923–1934

SR 35 was the designation for what is now the entirety of SR 9 between Armstrongs Mills and Salem. The route also included what is now SR 145 from Malaga to its northern terminus, and SR 148 between SR 145 and SR 9. The route existed from 1923 through 1934 when it was renumbered due to the addition of US 35 in Ohio.

== SR 36 (1923–1931) ==
State Route 36
- Location: Wooster–Kinsman Township
- Existed: 1923–1931

SR 36 was the route that preceded the designation of SR 5 between Wooster and community of Cornelion within Kinsman Township at the Pennsylvania state line. The route existed from 1923 through 1931. Though by 1932 most of route was renumbered to SR 5 due to the existence of US 36, today the route follows SR 585 from Wooster to Norton, local roads through Norton, Barberton, Akron, and Cuyahoga Falls; SR 59 through Kent and Ravenna, and SR 5 to Kinsman. North of Kinsman however, SR 36 traveled northeast to Cornelion on modern-day Trumbull County Road 360 while SR 5 when it was created in 1932 travels along the route it still follows.

== SR 40 (1923–1926) ==
State Route 40
- Location: Washington Court House-Zanesville
- Existed: 1923–1926

SR 40 was the section of modern-day US 22 between Washington Court House and Zanesville. The route existed from 1923 until 1926 when it was renumbered to SR 10 due to the designation of US 40 through Ohio.

== SR 42 (1923–1926) ==
State Route 42
- Location: Marion-Liberty Township
- Existed: 1923–1926

SR 42 was a state route across central Ohio that existed from 1923 through 1926. By 1927, the route had been renumbered to SR 95 due to the addition of US 42 but today, many routes follow the old route. The modern routing of SR 42 follows SR 95 from Marion to Fredericktown, SR 13 south to Mount Vernon, US 36 to SR 715, the length of SR 715, US 36 again to Coshocton, SR 541 to Kimbolton, and local roads to what was then SR 8 (later US 21).

== SR 47 (1923–1931) ==
State Route 47
- Location: Union Township-Findlay
- Existed: 1923–1931

SR 47 was a route across central Ohio. When it was first created in 1923 and through 1929, the route ran from Granville at SR 16 to SR 67 in Marseilles. In 1930, the route was extended at both ends; the route was extended slightly south to US 40 near Hebron and was extended north along local roads to Findlay. The extension was only in place for two years because it was replaced by an extended SR 37.

== SR 48 (1923–1926) ==
State Route 48
- Location: Fly-Dennison
- Existed: 1923–1926

SR 48 was a state route through southeastern Ohio that existed from 1923 to 1926. The route ran from Fly to Dennison along what is now the southernmost section of SR 800. The route was renumbered in 1926 by a relocated SR 8, SR 800's predecessor.

== SR 49 (1923–1926) ==
State Route 49
- Location: Cambridge-Steubenville
- Existed: 1923–1926

SR 49 was a state route that connected Cambridge and Steubenville from 1923 through 1926. The route was replaced by US 22 by 1927.
