= List of former state routes in Ohio =

There are eight lists of former state routes in the U.S. state of Ohio:

- List of former state routes in Ohio (1–49)
- List of former state routes in Ohio (50–130)
- List of former state routes in Ohio (142–219)
- List of former state routes in Ohio (223–270)
- List of former state routes in Ohio (271–352)
- List of former state routes in Ohio (354–568)
- List of former state routes in Ohio (569–673)
- List of former state routes in Ohio (675–824)

== See also ==
- List of state routes in Ohio
