= U.S. Route 250 in Ohio =

Section of U.S. Numbered Highway in Ohio, US

U.S. Route 250
- Route of US 250 in Ohio highlighted in red

Route information
- Maintained by ODOT
- Length: 161.81 mi (260.41 km)
- Existed: 1926–present

Major junctions
- West end: US 6 in Sandusky
- SR 2 in Perkins Township; I-80 / I-90 / Ohio Turnpike in Avery; US 20 in Norwalk; US 224 in Ruggles; US 42 in Ashland; I-71 in Ashland; US 30 in Wooster; I-77 from Strasburg to New Philadelphia; US 36 in Uhrichsville; US 22 in Cadiz
- East end: US 40 / US 250 at the West Virginia state line in Bridgeport

Location
- Country: United States
- State: Ohio
- Counties: Erie, Huron, Ashland, Wayne, Stark, Tuscarawas, Harrison, Jefferson, Belmont

Highway system
- United States Numbered Highway System; List; Special; Divided; Ohio State Highway System; Interstate; US; State; Scenic
← SR 250	→ SR 251

U.S. Route 250 (US 250) is a United States Numbered Highway that runs from Sandusky, Ohio to Richmond, Virginia. Within the state of Ohio, the route runs from US 6 in Sandusky to the West Virginia border at Bridgeport.

== Route description ==
In Ohio, U.S. 250 is an important cross-state corridor linking Sandusky (on Lake Erie) to Bridgeport (on the Ohio River). From a regional/traffic perspective, the route can roughly be divided into five sections linking major regions and routes of the state:

- US 6 in Sandusky to US 20 at Norwalk
- US 20 at Norwalk to US 30 at Wooster
- US 30 at Wooster to I-77 at Strasburg
- I-77 at New Philadelphia to US 22 at Cadiz
- US 22 at Cadiz to I-70 at Bridgeport

=== Sandusky to Norwalk ===
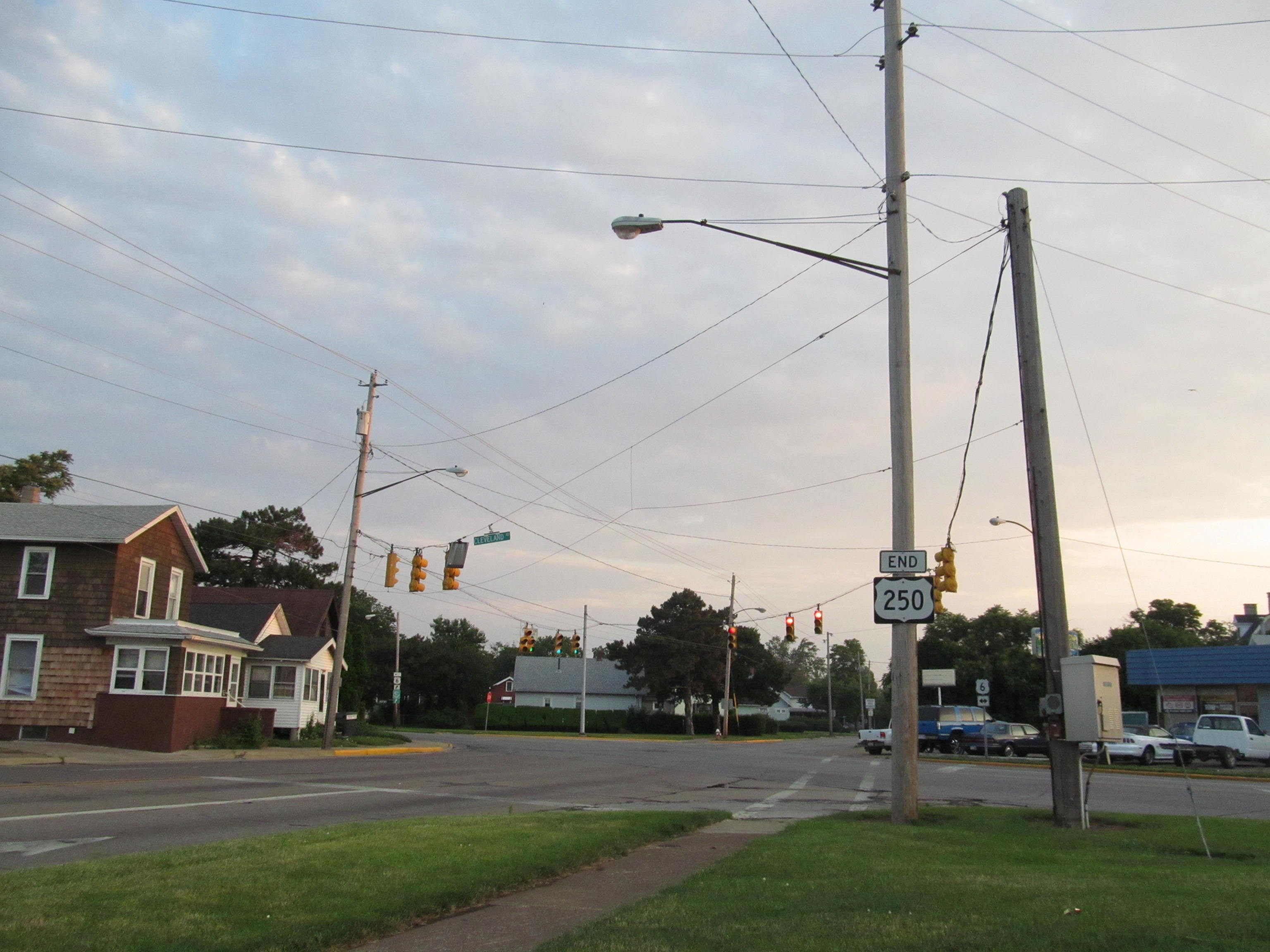
Western terminus in Sandusky

US 250 begins in Sandusky, Ohio at an intersection with US 6 (Cleveland Road). It begins carrying the name Sycamore Line, but US 250 leaves this road shortly for Milan Road. This part of the route carries much traffic connecting to the Ohio Turnpike, and during the summer, people bound for Cedar Point. It is the most heavily developed section of the road, lined with big box stores, a regional shopping mall, an outlet mall, and numerous hotels, indoor waterparks and restaurants.

US 250 crosses I-90 and SR 2 as it travels south and eventually crosses the Ohio Turnpike on Interstate 80. It then picks up SR 13 before passing west of Milan. After a short stretch, it enters Norwalk on Milan Avenue. It turns onto League Street and travels southwest to Whittlesey Avenue, which becomes Benedict Avenue as the street travels southeast through the center of the city.

=== Norwalk to Wooster ===
Much of this section of the route is rural and two-lane, but it carries a high level of truck and regular traffic. US 250 exits Norwalk and crosses US 20/SR 18 (Norwalk Bypass) at a diamond interchange. The route heads in a generally southeasterly direction until Fitchville, where it enters on Wooster Street. SR 13 finally separates from US 250 before the latter turns onto Mill Street Extension, turning south off said road shortly after.

US 250 continues southeast until it meets SR 60, and the two routes enter Savannah on North Main Street and pass straight through town. They continue together toward Ashland, where it meets an intersection with Cottage Street. SR 60 continues south on Cottage Street, while US 250 turns east, meeting US 42 east of the city and forming an overlap as it turns south. Upon meeting Main Street, US 250 leaves US 42 at an intersection and turns east. It passes through sparse development outside the city until it interchanges with I-71.

US 250 continues east on Ashland Road in open countryside, passing through small communities. West of Wooster, US 250 enters US 30, carrying the name Lincoln Way, and bypasses the city to the south, exiting at a partial cloverleaf interchange which sends it south on SR 83. US 250 then turns east on Dover Road south of the city.

=== Wooster to Strasburg ===
On Dover Road, US 250 follows a two-lane alignment as it passes through mostly open fields on its path to Strasburg. The route forms the main streets of several communities as it passes through them, such as Apple Creek, Mount Eaton, and Wilmot. It intersects SR 21 just before entering town, which it does on Wooster Avenue. This densely populated stretch of US 250 in Strasburg has been proposed for a bypass, but the project has not been selected for further work as of 2008.

After passing through Strasburg, US 250 enters I-77. The two routes then travel south concurrent with one another.

=== New Philadelphia to Cadiz ===
I-77 and US 250 travel in a southern direction until reaching New Philadelphia. The two highways form a bypass of the city, with the concurrency forming the west side and US 250 along forming the south side, as I-77 separates from US 250 in the southwest corner of the city. SR 800 joins the freeway at Broadway outside of New Philadelphia as it follows the Dennison/Uhrichsville freeway bypass of US 250. The two routes follow a four-lane, divided highway toward Uhrichsville, where US 250/SR 800 turns west at an interchange with US 36. At the end of the dual highway, SR 800 turns south toward Dennison, and US 250 turns northeast, initially following a two-lane, curvy alignment eastward into Harrison County toward the unincorporated community of Station 15 in Monroe Township, past the terminal intersection of SR 151, then southeast through Station 15, en route to Cadiz.

Approximately one-third of the way between Station 15 and Cadiz, US 250 follows Tappan Reservoir for several miles on a series of causeways built during the construction of the lake by the Muskingum Watershed Conservancy District in the 1930s. This route is generally of good quality (albeit without shoulders), although ODOT is studying replacement or upgrade through its Macro-Corridors Project. Near Cadiz, it merges onto the Cadiz Bypass, where it runs concurrent with US 22. It then turns onto Lincoln Avenue and passes through the city of Cadiz. US 250 then turns onto Market Street and follows it south out of town.

=== Cadiz to Bridgeport ===
From Cadiz, US 250's name changes to Cadiz–Harrisville Road, heading south-southeast. Shortly after exiting the city, US 250 begins to curve and wind sharply, with several hairpin turns. For much of this distance, the road is surrounded by dense residential areas and runs on ridge tops. After it passes through Harrisville, the road becomes less curvy but is fronted densely with homes for almost the remainder of its route within the state, save the forest at its south end, where it features another hairpin curve. It continues southeast to Bridgeport, where it features a partial interchange with SR 7. US 250 then joins US 40 and crosses the Ohio River into West Virginia.

The poor alignment of this section of the highway, along with the fact that it runs through Cadiz as opposed to bypassing it, limits the usefulness of this section of the road as a through route. To resolve these issues, the Ohio Department of Transportation is developing plans to construct a Super 2 replacement for this route. A bypass of Cadiz was planned for construction in 2004, although it has not been built as of 2017. The new route is to roughly parallel SR 9 and SR 331, running from Cadiz to a point near Saint Clairsville. At this point, it is expected that US 250 will be realigned to follow I-70 east to Wheeling, West Virginia.

== Major intersections ==
County	Location	mi	km	Destinations	Notes
Erie	Sandusky	0.00	0.00	US 6 / LECT (Cleveland Road) – Oak Harbor, Cleveland	Western terminus of US 250
Erie	Sandusky	0.58	0.93	Cedar Point (Butler Street)	interchange
Erie	Perkins Township	3.93	6.32	SR 2 – Cleveland, Toledo	Interchange; Exit 138 (SR 2)
Erie	Milan Township	9.62	15.48	I-80 / I-90 / Ohio Turnpike – Cleveland, Toledo	Interchange; Exit 118 (I-80)
Erie	Milan Township	10.63	17.11	SR 13 north – Huron, Cedar Point	West end of SR 13 concurrency
Erie	Milan Township	11.18	17.99	SR 113 west – Bellevue	West end of SR 113 concurrency
Erie	Milan	11.75	18.91	SR 113 east (Church Street) / Shawmill Road – Milan Business District, North Ridgeville	East end of SR 113 concurrency
Huron	Norwalk	15.81	25.44	SR 61 (Main Street)	
Huron	Norwalk	17.39	27.99	US 20 / SR 18 – Toledo, Cleveland	Interchange
Huron	Fitchville Township	27.34	44.00	SR 162 west – North Fairfield	West end of SR 162 concurrency
Huron	Fitchville	27.98	45.03	SR 13 south – Mansfield	east end of SR 13 overlap
Huron	Fitchville Township	28.32	45.58	SR 162 east – New London	East end of SR 162 concurrency
Ashland	Ruggles Township	33.92	54.59	US 224 – Napoleon, Akron, Mogadore	
Ashland	Clear Creek Township	38.59	62.10	SR 60 north – New London	West end of SR 60 concurrency
Ashland	Savannah	39.14	62.99	SR 545 south (Crowell Street) – Olivesburg, Mansfield	Northern terminus of SR 545
Ashland	Savannah	39.49	63.55	SR 302 east (McClaine Street) – Nankin	Western terminus of SR 302
Ashland	Ashland	45.03	72.47	SR 60 south (Cottage Street) / Faultless Drive – Ashland	East end of SR 60 concurrency
Ashland	Ashland	45.51	73.24	SR 511 – Rochester, Ashland	
Ashland	Ashland	46.18	74.32	SR 58 north – Ashland	Southern terminus of SR 58; interchange
Ashland	Ashland	47.28	76.09	US 42 north – Medina	West end of US 42 concurrency
Ashland	Ashland	48.26	77.67	US 42 south / SR 96 west – Mansfield, Ashland	East end of US 42 concurrency
Ashland	Montgomery Township	49.92	80.34	I-71 – Cleveland, Columbus	Exit 186 (I-71)
Ashland	Perry Township	52.30	84.17	SR 89 – Polk, Jeromesville	
Wayne	Plain Township	64.25	103.40	US 30 west – Mansfield	West end of US 30 concurrency; interchange; westbound exit and eastbound entrance
Wayne	Plain Township			west end of freeway	
Wayne	Wooster	67.31	108.32	SR 3 south (Columbus Avenue) – Loudonville	West end of SR 3 concurrency
Wayne	Wooster	68.15	109.68	SR 302 (Madison Avenue)	
Wayne	Wooster Township	69.32	111.56	Sylvan Road / East Lincoln Way	
Wayne	Wooster Township	69.60	112.01	US 30 east / SR 3 north / SR 83 north to SR 585 – Canton, Medina, Lodi	East end of US 30 and SR 3 concurrencies; west end of SR 83 concurrency
Wayne	Wooster Township			east end of freeway	
Wayne	Wooster Township	71.09	114.41	SR 83 south – Millersburg	East end of SR 83 concurrency; interchange
Wayne	East Union Township	77.20	124.24	Carr Road (CR 94A)	former SR 94
Wayne	Mount Eaton	83.97	135.14	SR 94 north / SR 241 south – Millersburg	West end of SR 241 concurrency; southern terminus of SR 94
Wayne	Mount Eaton	84.11	135.36	SR 241 north – Massillon	East end of SR 241 concurrency
Stark	Wilmot	88.58	142.56	US 62 west	West end of US 62 concurrency
Stark	Wilmot	88.65	142.67	US 62 east	East end of US 62 concurrency
Stark	Sugar Creek Township	90.82	146.16	SR 212 east – Beach City	Western terminus of SR 212
Tuscarawas	Franklin Township	91.73	147.63	SR 93 north – Beach City	West end of SR 93 concurrency
Tuscarawas	Franklin Township	92.89	149.49	SR 93 south – Sugarcreek	East end of SR 93 concurrency
Tuscarawas	Franklin Township	93.73	150.84	SR 21 north – Massillon	Southern terminus of SR 21
Tuscarawas	Franklin Township	96.81	155.80	I-77 north – Canton	west end of I-77 overlap; US 250 west follows exit 87
Tuscarawas	Franklin Township			west end of freeway	
Tuscarawas	Dover Township	99.61	160.31	Schneiders Crossing Road – Dover	I-77 exit 85
Tuscarawas	Dover Township	101.23	162.91	SR 39 / SR 211 – Sugarcreek, Dover	I-77 exit 83
Tuscarawas	Goshen Township	103.82	167.08	I-77 south / SR 39 (US 250 Bus. east) – Marietta, New Philadelphia	east end of I-77 overlap; US 250 east follows exit 81
Tuscarawas	New Philadelphia	105.62	169.98	SR 800 north / SR 416 – New Philadelphia, Tuscarawas	West end of SR 800 concurrency
Tuscarawas	Goshen Township	108.67	174.89	US 250 Bus. west / SR 259 – Schoenbrunn	
Tuscarawas	Goshen Township	110.41	177.69	Midvale, Barnhill	
Tuscarawas	Uhrichsville			east end of freeway	
Tuscarawas	Uhrichsville	113.36	182.44	US 36 west – Uhrichsville, Gnadenhutten, Newcomerstown	Eastern terminus of US 36; interchange
Tuscarawas	Uhrichsville			west end of freeway	
Tuscarawas	Mill Township	114.40	184.11	Dennison	
Tuscarawas	Union Township			east end of freeway	
Tuscarawas	Union Township	114.99	185.06	SR 800 south – Barnesville, Freeport, Dennison	East end of SR 800 concurrency
Harrison	Monroe Township	119.44	192.22	SR 151 east – Bowerston, Scio	Western terminus of SR 151
Harrison	Stock Township	127.95	205.92	SR 646 east – Scio	Western terminus of SR 646
Harrison	Cadiz Township	136.30	219.35	US 22 west – Cambridge	West end of US 22 concurrency; interchange
Harrison	Cadiz Township	137.51	221.30	US 22 east / SR 9 north – Steubenville, Scio, Carrollton	East end of US 22 concurrency; west end of SR 9 concurrency; interchange
Harrison	Cadiz	138.66	223.15	SR 9 south	East end of SR 9 concurrency
Harrison	Short Creek Township	147.69	237.68	SR 519 west – New Athens	Eastern terminus of SR 519
Jefferson	Mount Pleasant Township	150.94	242.91	SR 150 east – Mt. Pleasant, Dillonvale	Western terminus of SR 150
Belmont	Bridgeport	161.66	260.17	SR 7 north – Martins Ferry	interchange
Belmont	Bridgeport	161.75	260.31	US 40 west (SR 7A south) / SR 7 south (via SR 767 south) to I-70 – Bellaire, Bridgeport	west end of US 40 concurrency
Belmont	Bridgeport	161.82	260.42	US 40 east / US 250 south – Wheeling	West Virginia state line (Bridgeport Bridge over the Ohio River)
1.000 mi = 1.609 km; 1.000 km = 0.621 mi: Concurrency terminus; Tolled

U.S. Route 250
Previous state: Terminus	Ohio	Next state: West Virginia
