= Ohio State Route 259 =

State highway in Tuscarawas County, Ohio, US

State Route 259

Route information
- Maintained by ODOT
- Length: 4.41 mi (7.10 km)

Major junctions
- East end: SR 416 in Goshen Township
- US 250 / SR 800 in New Philadelphia
- West end: SR 39 in New Philadelphia

Location
- Country: United States
- State: Ohio
- Counties: Tuscarawas

Highway system
- Ohio State Highway System; Interstate; US; State; Scenic
← SR 258	→ SR 260

State Route 259 (SR 259, OH 259) is a 4.41-mile (7.10 km) long state highway in central Tuscarawas County, Ohio. The route runs from its eastern terminus at SR 416 in Goshen Township to its western terminus at SR 39 in New Philadelphia.

== Route description ==
SR 259 begins at a stop-controlled intersection with SR 416 in Goshen Township, just outside the community of Goshen. The route heads north immediately crossing the Tuscarawas River and has a grade crossing with a railroad. The route enters New Philadelphia and is surrounded by various warehouses and Ohio Department of Transportation offices. At County Route 125, SR 259 turns right onto Reiser Avenue. After 0.9 miles (1.4 km), the route reaches Brightwood Road and the ramps to and from the southbound lanes of the US 250 and SR 800 freeway. SR 259 turns northwest onto East High Avenue, becomes co-signed with US 250 Business, and crosses over the freeway. The route passes the northbound ramps of the freeway before entering the Schoenbrunn section of New Philadelphia. With the exception of passing Harry Clever Field, the route goes through mostly residential neighborhoods of New Philadelphia. The route ends at a signalized intersection of SR 39 and 4th Street. SR 39 continues ahead on East High Avenue but turns onto Beaver Avenue heading east.

No part of SR 259 is included within the National Highway System.

== History ==
SR 256 was first designated between 1925 and 1926 on an alignment between Gnadenhutten at US 36 and Schoenbrunn at what was then US 250, SR 8, and SR 16. Most of this route is currently SR 416, but also followed modern-day CR 125 into Schoenbrunn. Between 1932 and 1933, SR 16 took over SR 259 south of Goshen leaving the route only 2-mile (3.2 km) long. This routing would remain intact until about 1965 when the US 250 freeway was built; this allowed SR 259 to be extended to SR 39. Since then, no major changes in alignments have occurred.

== Major intersections ==
The entire route is in Tuscarawas County.

Location	mi	km	Destinations	Notes
Goshen Township	0.00	0.00	SR 416	
New Philadelphia	1.38	2.22	US 250 / SR 800 – Uhrichsville, Wooster	Interchange
New Philadelphia	4.41	7.10	SR 39 (East High Avenue / Beaver Avenue) / 4th Avenue – Carrollton, Millersburg	
1.000 mi = 1.609 km; 1.000 km = 0.621 mi
