= Robert Skimin =

Robert Skimin (July 30, 1929 – May 9, 2011) was a U.S. Army officer, artist, and Pulitzer Prize-nominated and award-winning author of both fiction and historical books.

== Military career ==
Born in Belden, Ohio, Skimin became an army aviator during the Korean War. He was awarded the Purple Heart, the Bronze Star, and the Army Commendation Medal with Oak Leaf Cluster.

== Author ==
Skimin has written a number of books of both factual and alternate history. The Library of Congress lists 14 titles to date. He has received several awards, including induction into the El Paso Writers Hall of Fame, and received the Ohiana Book Award in 1984 for Chikara. In 1993, he earned a Pulitzer Prize nomination for Apache Autumn with most other titles being best sellers.

His last work was a book series called Danny Drumm's Heroes: Author speaks of series on YouTube.

- Volume 1: Johnny Clem - This book introduces the narrator, a Civil War drummer boy, and his dog Shadow. It tells the story of one of the many drummer boys in the Civil War who later became a two-star general, John Clem.
- Volume 2: America's Beginnings - The Spaniards - Danny Drumm narrates the early exploration of the Americas.
- Volume 3: The Early Settlement of New Mexico - This book is largely about the Spaniard's conquest of New Mexico and touches on the Indian rebellions.
- Volume 4: "The Pilgrims" - and the Indians they met and the unrest with the colonies.
- Volume 5: about battles and presidents. In the works, not yet released.

Skimin died on May 9, 2011, in El Paso, Texas, aged 81. He was buried at Fort Bliss National Cemetery.

=== Bibliography ===
Skimin published both novels and nonfiction.

- Los Toros (The Story of Bullfighting) (nonfiction, 1973)
- The Booze Game (memoir, 1976)
- The Rhodesian Sellout (nonfiction, 1977)
- Soldier for Hire (series of adventure novels; Skimin wrote four books in the series, while other writers contributed to the series)
  - Zulu Blood (1981)
  - Trojan in Iran (1981)
  - U.N. Sabotage (1981)
  - Bloodletting! (1982)
- Chikara! (historical novel, 1984)
- Gray Victory (alternate history novel, 1988)
- Renegade Lightning (written with Ferdie Pacheco) (historical novel, 1992)
- Apache Autumn (historical novel, 1993)
- Ulysses: A Biographical Novel of U.S. Grant (historical novel, 1994)
- The River and the Horsemen: A Novel of the Little Bighorn (historical novel, 1999)
- Custer's Luck (written with William E. Moody) (alternate history novel, 2000)
- Footprints of Heroes: From the American Revolution to the War in Iraq (nonfiction, 2005)
- Danny Drumm's Heroes (four juvenile history books, 2006–2009)
