= Malaga, Ohio =

Unincorporated community in Ohio, U.S.

Coordinates: 39°51′17″N 81°08′57″W

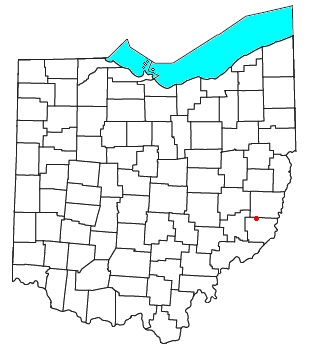
Location of Malaga, Ohio

Malaga (/məˈlɑːɡə/ mə-LAH-gə) is an unincorporated community in northern Malaga Township, Monroe County, Ohio, United States. Malaga has a ZIP code of 43747 (Jerusalem, as there is no post office in Malaga). It lies at the intersection of State Routes 145 and 800.

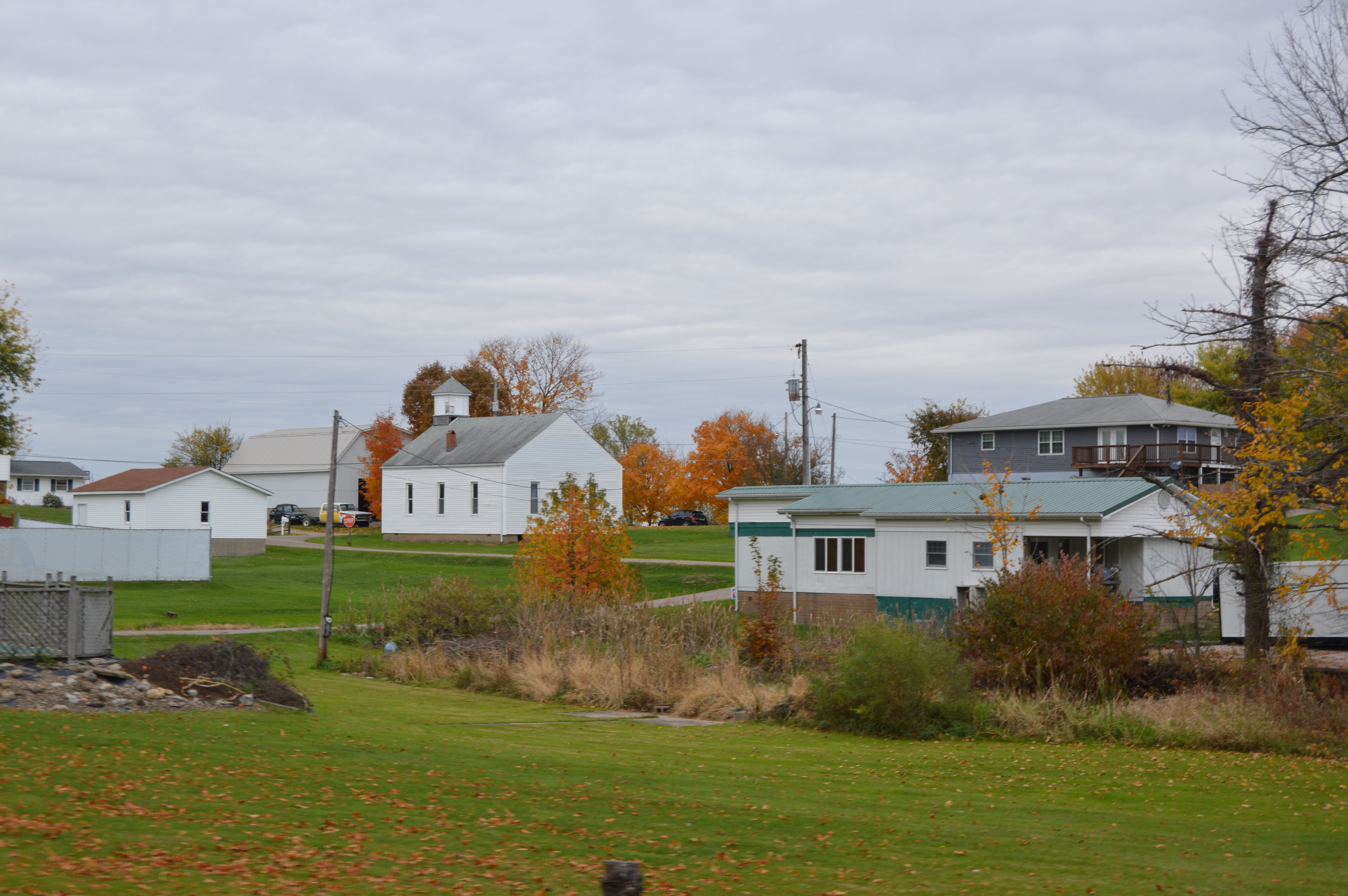
Houses and a church in Malaga

The community was named after Málaga, in Spain.
