= Hugh Talbot Patrick =

American neurologist

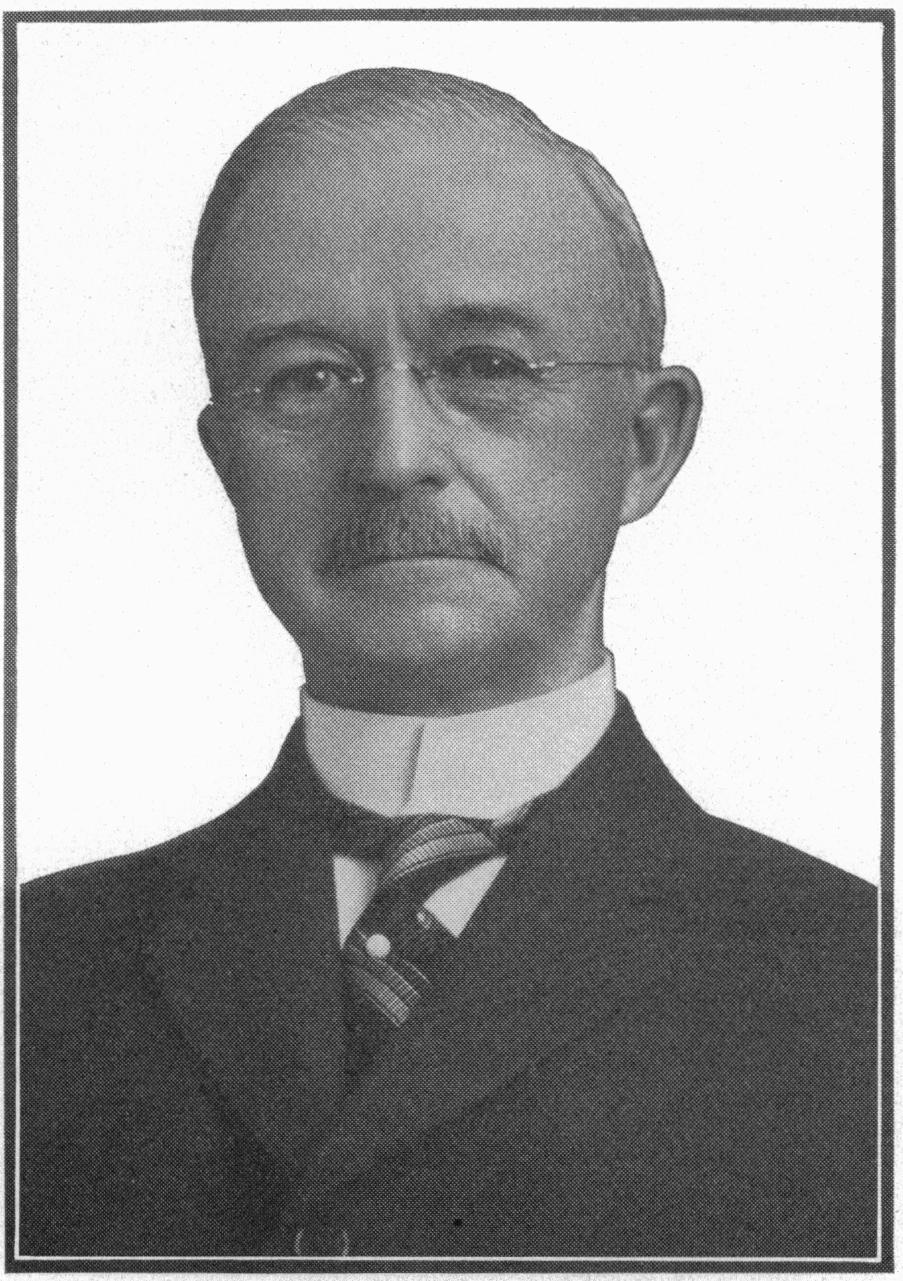
Hugh Talbot Patrick

Hugh Talbot Patrick (May 11, 1860 – January 5, 1939) was an American neurologist.

Patrick graduated in medicine from the Bellevue Hospital Medical College in 1884. In 1891, he traveled to Europe where he studied neurology in Berlin under Emanuel Mendel. In 1898, he was appointed Associate Professor at the medical school of Northwestern University. Patrick is Founder of the Chicago Neurological Society.

== Personal life ==
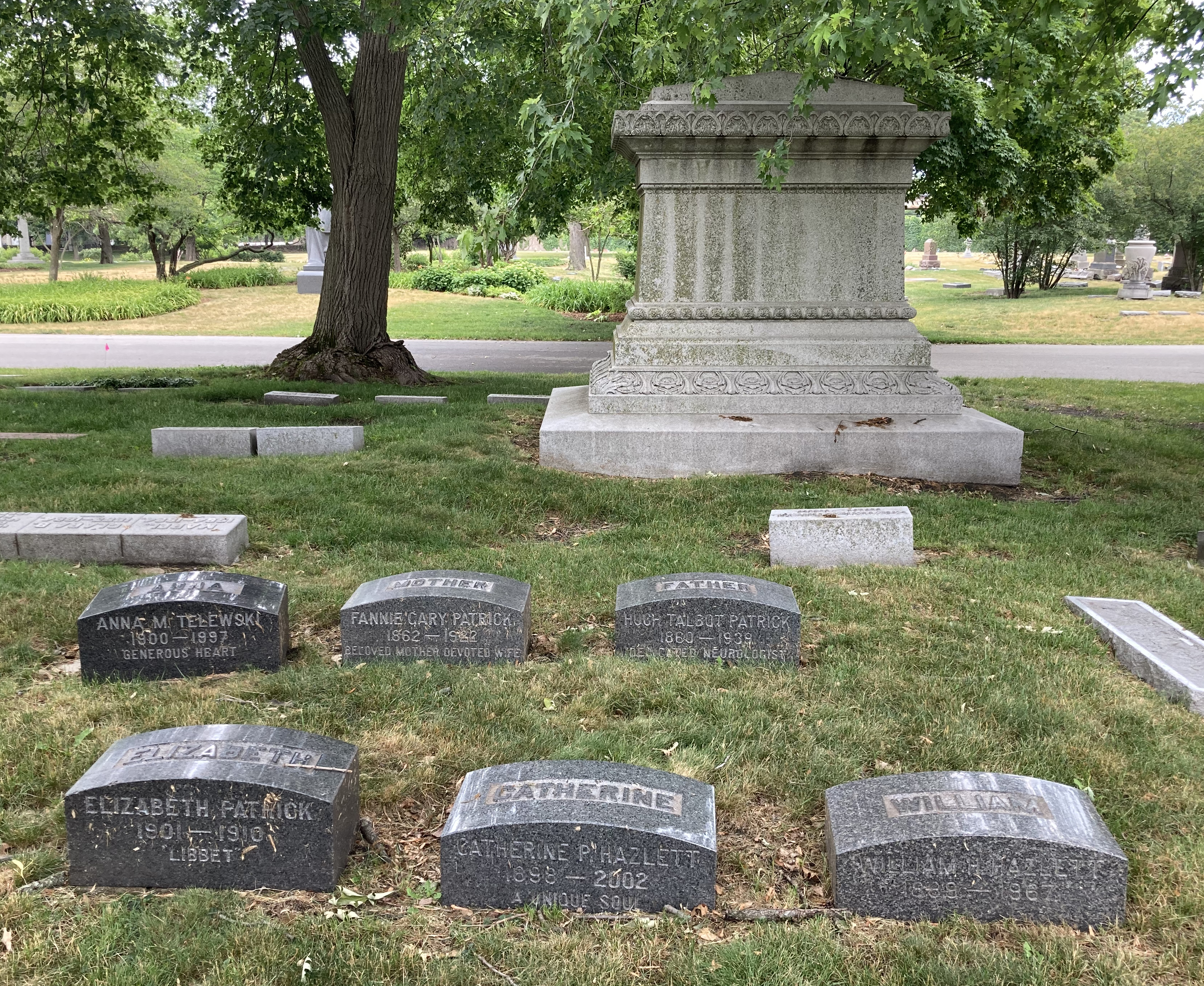
Patrick's grave at Graceland Cemetery

Hugh Talbot Patrick was born in New Philadelphia, Ohio on May 11, 1860. He was married April 28, 1896 to Fannie E. Gary. They had three children: Talbot, Catherine, and Elizabeth Patrick.

He died in Chicago on January 5, 1939, and was buried at Graceland Cemetery.

== Works ==
- The Bryson Symptom in Exophthalmic Goitre (1895)
- Remarks on Spinal Irritation (1897)
- Anaesthesia of the Trunk in Locomotor Ataxia (1897)
- Parkinson's Disease. A Clinical Study of One Hundred and Forty-six Cases

== Bibliography ==
- Lewis J. Pollock. "Hugh Talbot Patrick 1860–1939". Am J Psychiatry 95:1257-1258, 1939 doi:10.1176/appi.ajp.95.5.1257
