= Henry Schriver =

American politician

Member of the Ohio House of Representatives from the 75th district
- In office January 3, 1967 – December 31, 1968
- Preceded by: None (First)
- Succeeded by: Don Pease

Personal details
- Born: October 13, 1914 Belden, Ohio
- Died: March 27, 2011 (aged 96) Grafton, Ohio
- Party: Republican

Henry Haley Schriver (October 13, 1914 – March 27, 2011) was a former member of the Ohio House of Representatives.
