= Sandyville, Ohio =

- CDP
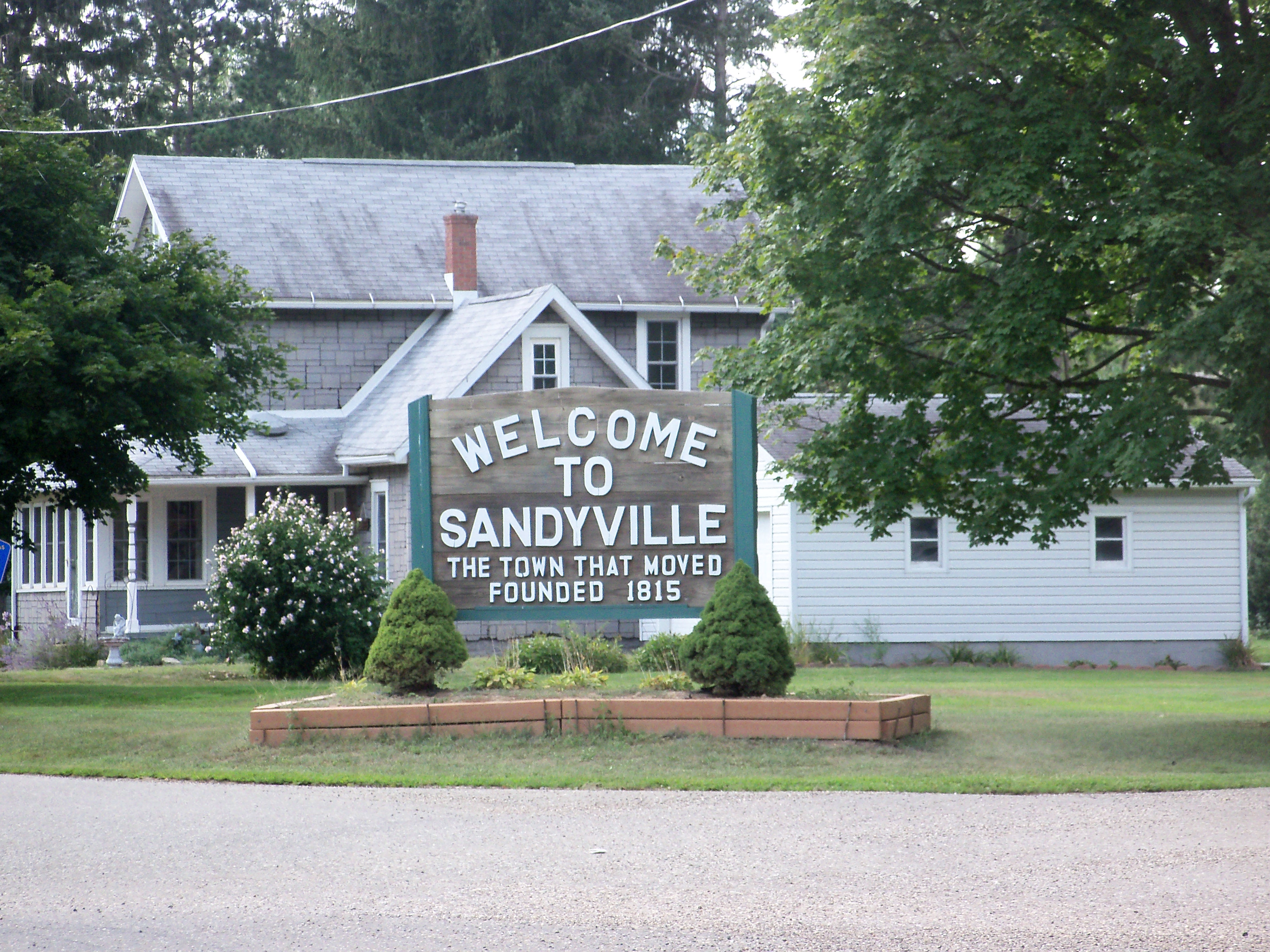
- Sign at five-way intersection

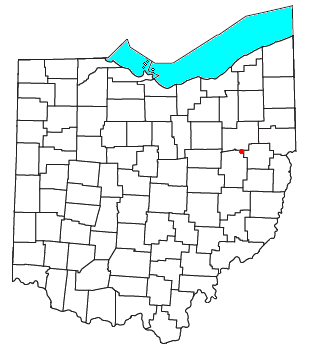
- Location of Sandyville, Ohio
- Coordinates: 40°38′49″N 81°22′01″W
- Country: United States
- State: Ohio
- County: Tuscarawas
- Township: Sandy
- Elevation: 991 ft (302 m)

Population (2020)
  - Total: 350
- Time zone: UTC-5 (Eastern (EST))
  - Summer (DST): UTC-4 (EDT)
- ZIP code: 44671
- GNIS feature ID: 2628966

Sandyville is an unincorporated community and census-designated place in northern Sandy Township, Tuscarawas County, Ohio, United States. It has a post office with the ZIP code 44671. It lies along State Route 800 between Canton and New Philadelphia. The population was 350 at the 2020 census.

== History ==
Sandyville was laid out and platted in 1815. The community takes its name from nearby Sandy Creek. A post office called Sandyville has been in operation since 1816. The village was originally located a half-mile south next to Sandy Creek, but decided to move to its present site in the 1930s after the Muskingum Watershed Conservancy District announced plans to build a series of dams in the region that would have put the town inside a flood plain. About 30 homes, the town hall, post office and several businesses were physically moved uphill to the new site between 1937 and 1938.
