= Ohio State Route 416 =

State highway in Tuscarawas County, Ohio, US

State Route 416

Route information
- Maintained by ODOT
- Length: 14.98 mi (24.11 km)
- Existed: 1969–present

Major junctions
- South end: US 36 near Gnadenhutten
- US 250 / SR 39 / SR 800 in New Philadelphia
- North end: SR 800 near Dover

Location
- Country: United States
- State: Ohio
- Counties: Tuscarawas

Highway system
- Ohio State Highway System; Interstate; US; State; Scenic
← SR 412	→ SR 420

State Route 416 (SR 416) is a north–south state highway in the east-central portion of Ohio. The southern terminus of State Route 416 is at a T-intersection with U.S. Route 36 just west of Gnadenhutten. Its northern terminus is at a T-intersection with State Route 800 approximately 2 miles (3.2 km) east of Dover.

== Route description ==
All of State Route 416 is situated within Tuscarawas County. No portion of this state highway is included within the National Highway System.

== History ==
As a result of the truncation of State Route 16 to Coshocton in 1969, State Route 416 was created in that year. Prior to then, State Route 16 ran concurrently with U.S. Route 36 heading east from Coshocton to just west of Gnadenhutten. where it then turned north and followed the entire length of what is now State Route 416 up to and endpoint at then State Route 8, which is now designated State Route 800. In 1969, State Route 16 was truncated to its current endpoint at U.S. Route 36/State Route 83 in Coshocton. The portion of what was State Route 16 from U.S. Route 36 near Gnadenhutten to State Route 800 east of Dover was given the designation of State Route 416. No changes have taken place to the routing of this highway since its debut.

== Major intersections ==
The entire route is in Tuscarawas County.

Location	mi	km	Destinations	Notes
Clay Township	0.00	0.00	US 36	
Goshen Township	7.87	12.67	SR 259 west	Eastern terminus of SR 259
New Philadelphia	10.85	17.46	US 250 / SR 800 south – Uhrichsville, Wooster	Interchange; southern end of SR 800 concurrency
New Philadelphia	11.54	18.57	SR 39 / SR 800 north (High Street)	Northern end of SR 800 concurrency
Dover Township	14.98	24.11	SR 800 – Dover, Mineral City	
1.000 mi = 1.609 km; 1.000 km = 0.621 mi: Concurrency terminus
