= Ohio State Route 39 =

East-west state highway in Ohio, US

State Route 39
- SR 39 highlighted in red

Route information
- Maintained by ODOT
- Length: 154.28 mi (248.29 km)
- Existed: 1924–present

Major junctions
- West end: SR 103 near New Washington
- US 30 in Mansfield; I-71 near Mansfield; SR 3 / SR 60 in Loudonville; US 62 from Millersburg to Berlin; I-77 in Dover; I-77 / US 250 in New Philadelphia; SR 9 / SR 43 / SR 332 in Carrollton; US 30 / SR 7 / SR 11 in East Liverpool
- East end: PA 68 near East Liverpool

Location
- Country: United States
- State: Ohio
- Counties: Crawford, Richland, Ashland, Holmes, Tuscarawas, Carroll, Columbiana

Highway system
- Ohio State Highway System; Interstate; US; State; Scenic
← SR 38	→ US 40

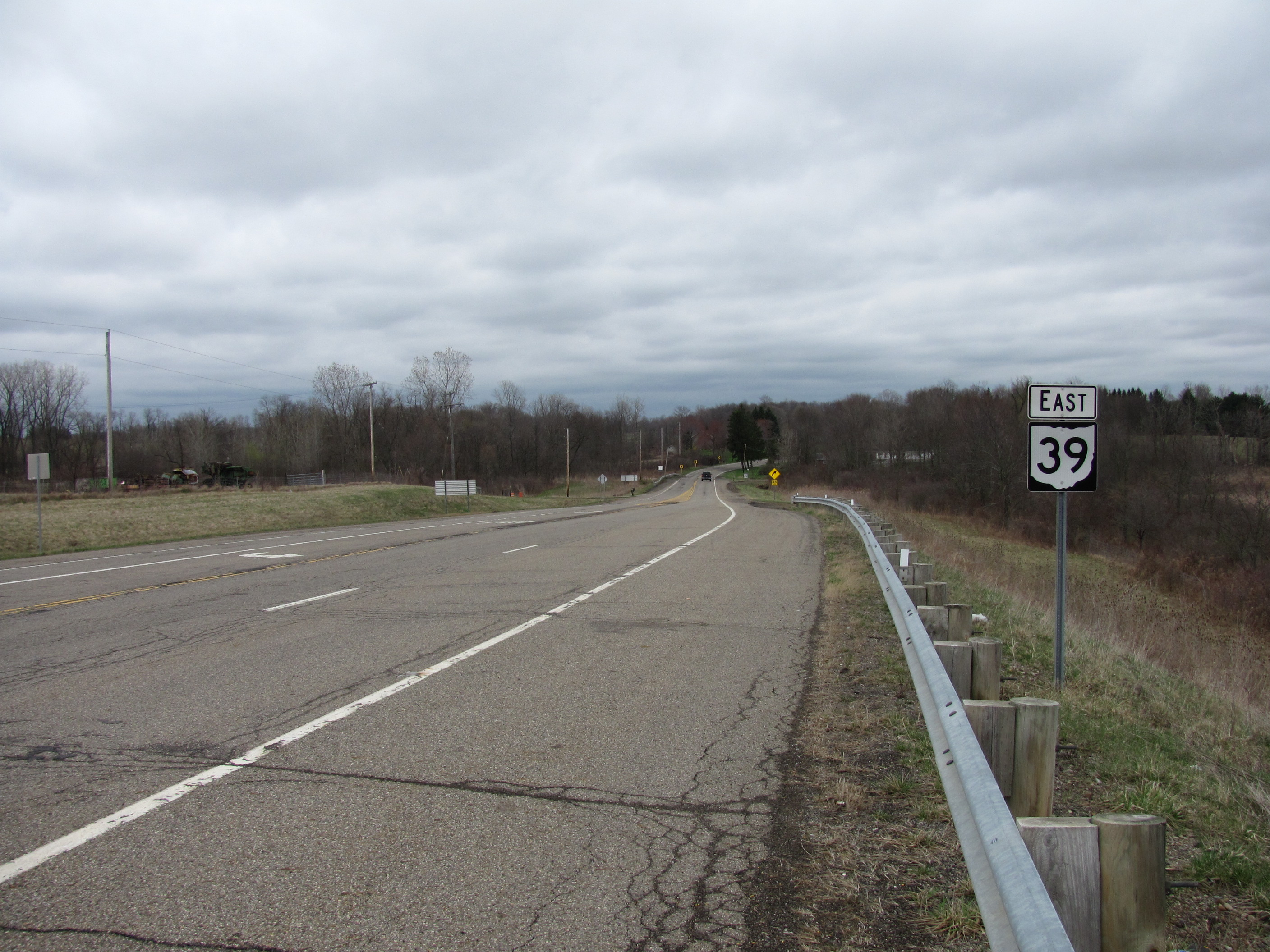
Eastbound near Mansfield, Ohio

State Route 39 (SR 39) is a primarily east–west running state highway in north-central and northeastern portion of the U.S. state of Ohio. The route runs through seven counties on its approximately 155-mile (249 km) trip through the region. Its western terminus is at State Route 103 near New Washington, and its eastern terminus is at PA 68 near East Liverpool.

== Route Description ==
=== Columbiana County ===
Ohio State Route 39 has an eastern terminus at the Pennsylvania state line near East Liverpool, Ohio. It then continues as a two-laned road through residential areas of East Liverpool. It widens into a four lane road just east of the interchange with US 30, and proceeds northwest as a freeway around downtown East Liverpool.

== History ==
SR 39 was commissioned in 1923, originally routed from Shelby to Dover. In 1927 the highway was extended to the current eastern terminus at the Pennsylvania state line, along mostly the former route of SR 20. The route was extended to its current northern terminus at SR 103, in 1939. Between 1969 and 1971 the road between Shelby and Mansfield became a four-lane highway. In 1974, the route between Wellsville and East Liverpool was upgraded to a four-lane highway.

== Junctions ==
County	Location	mi	km	Destinations	Notes
Crawford	Auburn Township	0.00	0.00	SR 103	Western terminus of SR 39
Crawford	Tiro	3.15	5.07	SR 98	SR 98 crosses southwest-northeast.
Crawford	Vernon Township	5.87	9.45	SR 598	SR 598 crosses north–south.
Richland	Sharon Township	8.75	14.08	SR 96	SR 96 joins from the southwest.
Richland	Shelby	11.04	17.77	SR 61	SR 61 crosses north–south
Richland	Shelby	11.32	18.22	SR 96	SR 96 leaves to the east, SR 39 heads southward.
Richland	Mansfield	21.45	34.52	US 30	Full-access interchange with US 30, exit 129.
Richland	Mansfield	22.81	36.71	SR 13	SR 13 South (one way) heads south, SR 39 turns east.
Richland	Mansfield	22.94	36.92	SR 13	SR 13 North (one way) crosses.
Richland	Mansfield	23.41	37.67	SR 545	SR 545 begins to the north (Southern terminus).
Richland	Mansfield	23.72	38.17	US 42	US 42 crosses southwest-northeast.
Richland	Mansfield	24.01	38.64	SR 430	SR 430 joins from the west.
Richland	Madison Township	24.99	40.22	SR 430	SR 430 leaves to the east.
Richland	Madison Township	26.77	43.08	I-71	Full-access interchange with I-71, exit 173.
Richland	Monroe Township	32.58	52.43	SR 603	SR 603 crosses north–south
Ashland	Green Township	36.60	58.90	SR 511	SR 511 begins to the north (Southern terminus).
Ashland	Perrysville	39.01	62.78	SR 95	SR 95 crosses southwest-northeast
Ashland	Loudonville	44.30	71.29	SR 3	SR 3 joins from the south.
Ashland	Loudonville	44.45	71.54	SR 3 SR 60	SR 3 leaves to the north, SR 60 joins from the north.
Holmes	Washington Township	50.70	81.59	SR 179	SR 179 begins to the north (Southern terminus).
Holmes	Nashville	51.51	82.90	SR 514	SR 514 crosses southwest-northeast.
Holmes	Monroe Township	56.60	91.09	SR 60; SR 754	SR 60 leaves to the south. SR 754 leaves to the north (Southern terminus).
Holmes	Millersburg	62.40	100.42	US 62; SR 83	US 62 joins from the south. SR 83 crosses north–south.
Holmes	Millersburg	62.52	100.62	SR 241	SR 241 begins to the north (Southern terminus).
Holmes	Berlin Township	67.51	108.65	SR 557	SR 557 begins to the south (Northern terminus).
Holmes	Berlin	69.21	111.38	US 62	US 62 leaves to the northeast.
Holmes	Walnut Creek	73.29	117.95	SR 515	SR 515 begins to the north (Southern terminus).
Tuscarawas	Sugarcreek	78.36	126.11	SR 93	SR 93 crosses north–south.
Tuscarawas	Dover	87.41	140.67	SR 516	SR 516 begins to the northwest (Southern terminus).
Tuscarawas	Dover	87.58	140.95	I-77	Full-access interchange with I-77, exit 83.
Tuscarawas	Dover	87.67	141.09	SR 211	SR 211 begins to the south (Northern terminus).
Tuscarawas	New Philadelphia	90.31	145.34	I-77; US 250	Full-access interchange. I-77/US 250 North run concurrent, exit 81. Split on-ramp to I-77 South and US 250 South.
Tuscarawas	New Philadelphia	91.79	147.72	SR 800	SR 800 joins from the north.
Tuscarawas	New Philadelphia	92.14	148.28	SR 416; SR 800	SR 416 crosses north–south. SR 800 leaves to the south.
Tuscarawas	New Philadelphia	92.48	148.83	SR 259	SR 259 begins to the south (Northern terminus).
Carroll	Sherrodsville	104.31	167.87	SR 212	SR 212 joins from the south.
Carroll	Monroe Township	105.01	169.00	SR 212	SR 212 leaves to the northwest.
Carroll	Dellroy	109.51	176.24	SR 542	Intersection where SR 542 runs to the north and west, and SR 39 to the south and east.
Carroll	Carrollton	117.01	188.31	SR 43	SR 43 joins from the north
Carroll	Carrollton	117.43	188.99	SR 9 SR 332	SR 9 joins from the north. SR 332 begins to the south (Northern terminus).
Carroll	Carrollton	117.94	189.81	SR 9 SR 43	SR 9/SR 43 leave to the south.
Carroll	Mechanicstown	126.17	203.05	SR 524	SR 524 begins to the south (Northern terminus).
Columbiana	Salineville	132.33	212.96	SR 644	SR 644 begins to the north (Southern terminus).
Columbiana	Salineville	132.96	213.98	SR 164	SR 164 joins from the south.
Columbiana	Washington Township	135.49	218.05	SR 164	SR 164 leaves to the north.
Columbiana	Wellsville	144.99	233.34	SR 7	SR 7 joins from the south.
Columbiana	Wellsville	146.93	236.46	SR 45	SR 45 begins to the north (Southern terminus).
Columbiana	East Liverpool	149.49	240.58	US 30; SR 7 SR 11	SR 7 leaves to the north. US 30/SR 11 cross north–south and SR 39 joins it to the south.
Columbiana	East Liverpool	151.10	243.17	US 30; SR 11	US 30/SR 11 leaves to the south into West Virginia; SR 11 ends at the West Virginia line on US 30.
Columbiana	East Liverpool	154.28	248.29	PA 68	Eastern terminus of SR 39 at Pennsylvania state line
1.000 mi = 1.609 km; 1.000 km = 0.621 mi: Concurrency terminus
