= Midvale, Ohio =

- Village
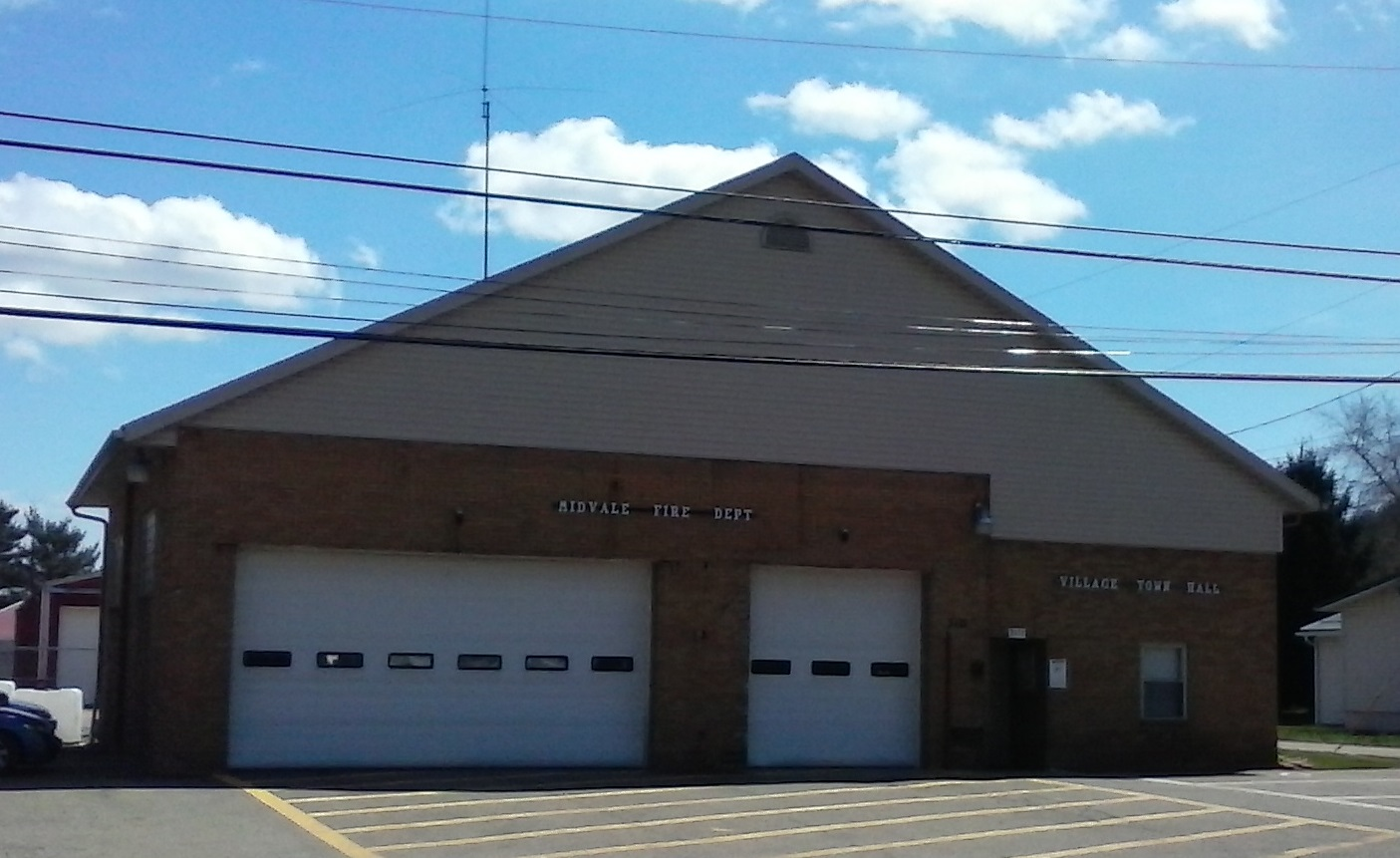
- Town Hall

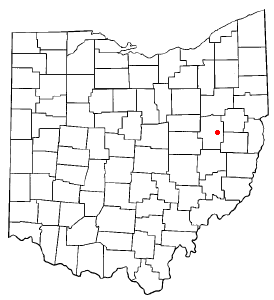
- Location of Midvale, Ohio

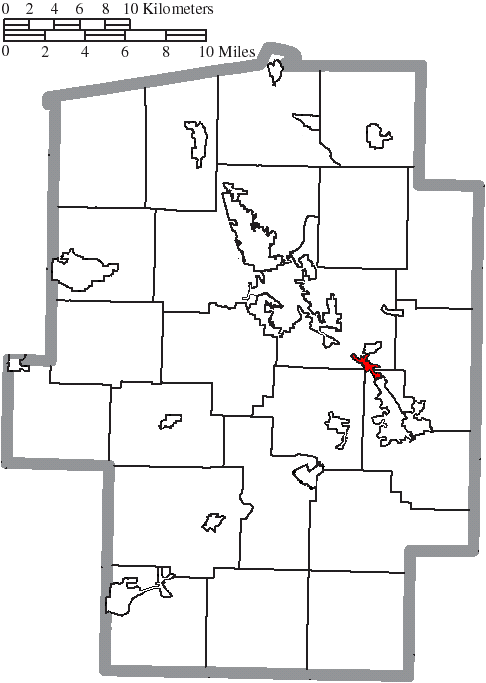
- Location of Midvale in Tuscarawas County
- Coordinates: 40°26′17″N 81°22′26″W
- Country: United States
- State: Ohio
- County: Tuscarawas
- Townships: Goshen, Mill, & Warwick

Area
  - Total: 0.74 sq mi (1.91 km^{2})
  - Land: 0.74 sq mi (1.91 km^{2})
  - Water: 0 sq mi (0.00 km^{2})
- Elevation: 873 ft (266 m)

Population (2020)
  - Total: 673
  - Density: 914.6/sq mi (353.14/km^{2})
- Time zone: UTC-5 (Eastern (EST))
  - Summer (DST): UTC-4 (EDT)
- ZIP code: 44653
- Area code: 330
- FIPS code: 39-49966
- GNIS feature ID: 2399338

Midvale is a village in Tuscarawas County, Ohio, United States. The population was 673 at the 2020 census.

== History ==
Midvale was platted in 1888. The village was named for its location halfway between New Philadelphia and Uhrichsville.

== Geography ==
According to the United States Census Bureau, the village has a total area of 0.76 square miles (1.97 km^{2}), all land.

== Demographics ==
Historical population
Census	Pop.	Note	%±
1930	667		—
1940	670		0.4%
1950	632		−5.7%
1960	683		8.1%
1970	636		−6.9%
1980	654		2.8%
1990	575		−12.1%
2000	547		−4.9%
2010	754		37.8%
2020	673		−10.7%
U.S. Decennial Census

=== 2010 census ===
As of the census of 2010, there were 754 people, 279 households, and 201 families living in the village. The population density was 992.1 inhabitants per square mile (383.1/km^{2}). There were 291 housing units at an average density of 382.9 per square mile (147.8/km^{2}). The racial makeup of the village was 98.0% White, 0.8% African American, 0.4% from other races, and 0.8% from two or more races. Hispanic or Latino of any race were 1.2% of the population.

There were 279 households, of which 42.7% had children under the age of 18 living with them, 47.3% were married couples living together, 15.4% had a female householder with no husband present, 9.3% had a male householder with no wife present, and 28.0% were non-families. 20.8% of all households were made up of individuals, and 8.3% had someone living alone who was 65 years of age or older. The average household size was 2.70 and the average family size was 3.04.

The median age in the village was 33.7 years. 29% of residents were under the age of 18; 8% were between the ages of 18 and 24; 28.5% were from 25 to 44; 23.9% were from 45 to 64; and 10.7% were 65 years of age or older. The gender makeup of the village was 49.7% male and 50.3% female.

=== 2000 census ===
As of the census of 2000, there were 547 people, 213 households, and 156 families living in the village. The population density was 897.5 inhabitants per square mile (346.5/km^{2}). There were 226 housing units at an average density of 370.8 per square mile (143.2/km^{2}). The racial makeup of the village was 98.72% White, and 1.28% from two or more races. Hispanic or Latino of any race were 0.37% of the population.

There were 213 households, out of which 31.0% had children under the age of 18 living with them, 57.7% were married couples living together, 10.8% had a female householder with no husband present, and 26.3% were non-families. 22.5% of all households were made up of individuals, and 9.9% had someone living alone who was 65 years of age or older. The average household size was 2.57 and the average family size was 3.01.

In the village, the population was spread out, with 24.9% under the age of 18, 9.3% from 18 to 24, 28.9% from 25 to 44, 25.0% from 45 to 64, and 11.9% who were 65 years of age or older. The median age was 37 years. For every 100 females there were 100.4 males. For every 100 females age 18 and over, there were 93.9 males.

The median income for a household in the village was $26,944, and the median income for a family was $33,750. Males had a median income of $27,813 versus $15,417 for females. The per capita income for the village was $14,975. About 14.1% of families and 12.2% of the population were below the poverty line, including 10.4% of those under age 18 and 11.1% of those age 65 or over.

== Notable person ==
- Frank Baumholtz - former MLB outfielder
