= Belden, Ohio =

Unincorporated community in Ohio, U.S.

Coordinates: 41°14′17″N 82°01′24″W

Belden is an unincorporated community in Lorain County, in the U.S. state of Ohio.

== History ==
Belden was originally called Rawsonville. A post office called Rawsonville was established in 1852, the name was changed to Belden in 1876, and the post office closed in 1902. The present name is derived from Bildad Beldin, a pioneer settler.

== Notable people ==
- Henry Schriver (1914–2011), former member of the Ohio House of Representatives
- Robert Skimin (1929–2011), former Army officer and author
