= Lacarne, Ohio =

- Unincorporated community
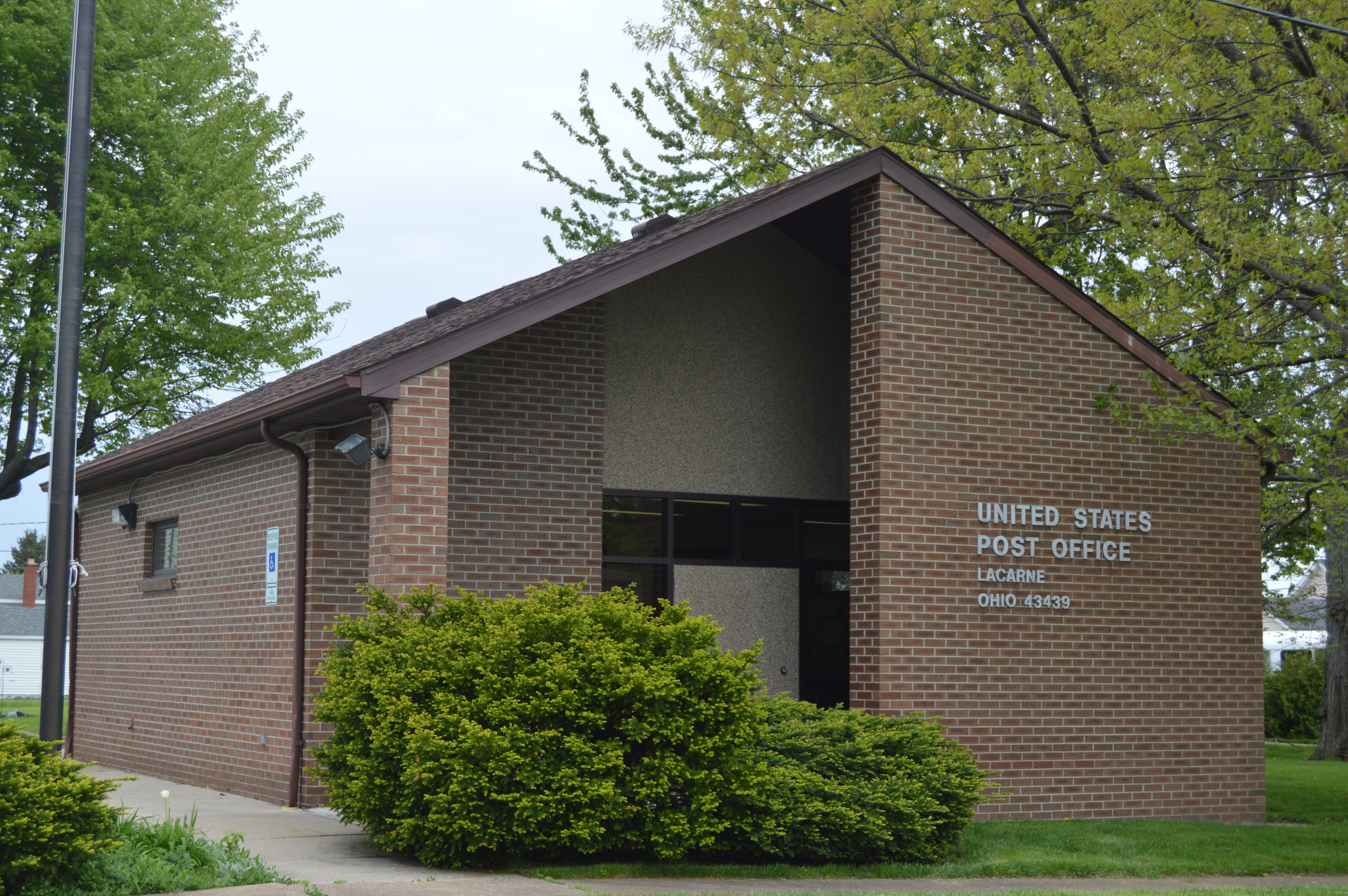
- Post office

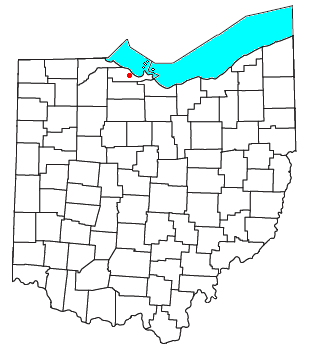
- Location of Lacarne, Ohio
- Coordinates: 41°30′57″N 83°02′32″W
- Country: United States
- State: Ohio
- County: Ottawa
- Township: Erie
- Elevation: 577 ft (176 m)
- Time zone: UTC-5 (Eastern (EST))
  - Summer (DST): UTC-4 (EDT)
- ZIP codes: 43439
- GNIS feature ID: 1064958

Lacarne is an unincorporated community in southwestern Erie Township, Ottawa County, Ohio, United States. It has a post office with the ZIP code 43439.

The community most likely bears the French surname of a pioneer settler.
