= West Chester, Tuscarawas County, Ohio =

Unincorporated community in Ohio, U.S.

Coordinates: 40°14′01″N 81°20′39″W

West Chester is an unincorporated community in Tuscarawas County, in the U.S. state of Ohio.

== History ==
West Chester was laid out and platted in 1814. An old variant name of West Chester was Cadwallader. A post office called Cadwallader was established in 1828, and remained in operation until 1918.
