= Barnhill, Ohio =

- Village
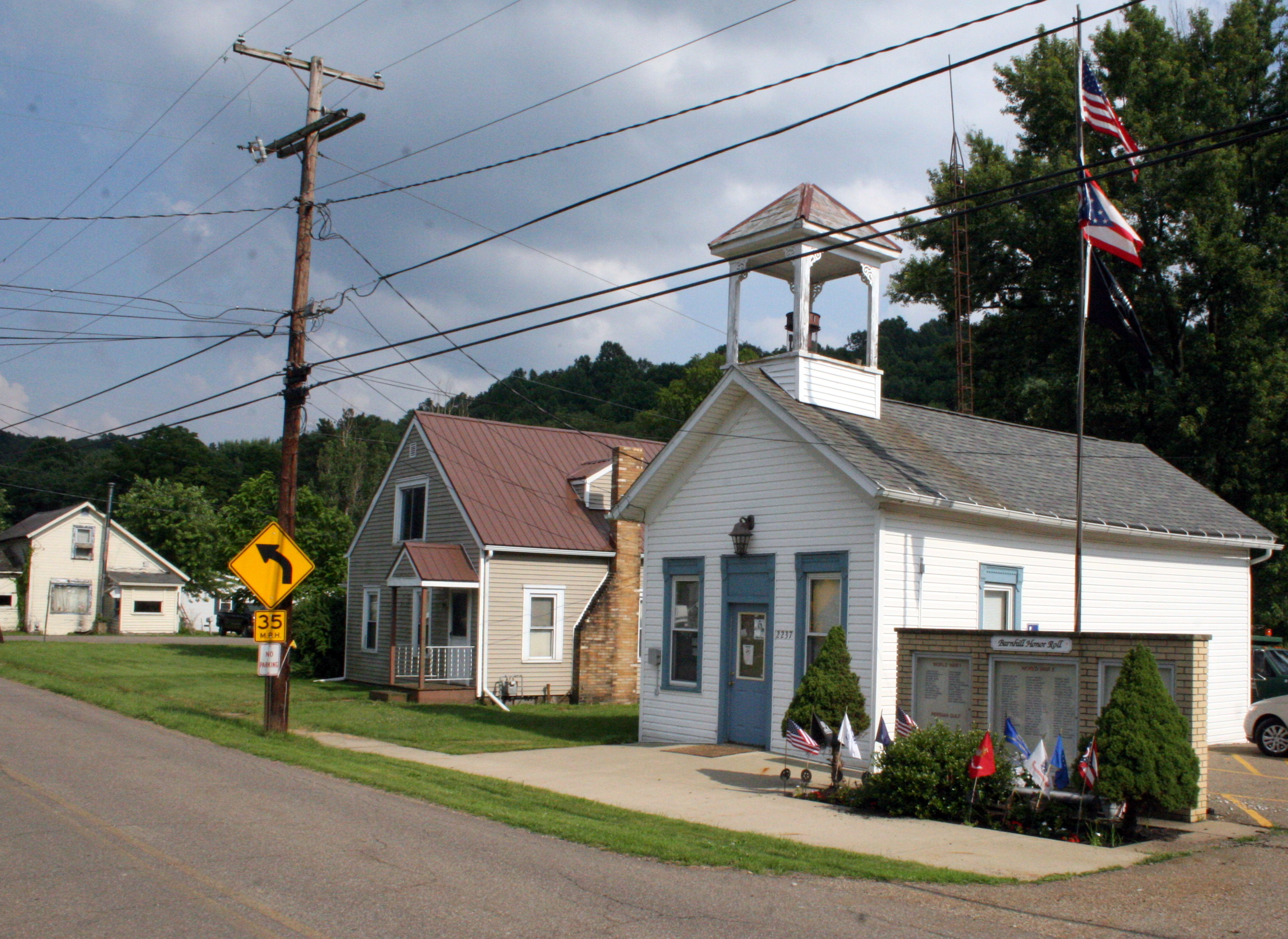
- Barnhill Village Hall

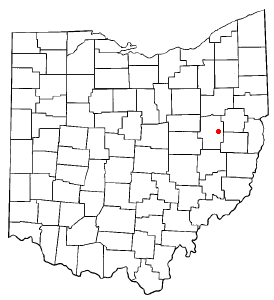
- Location of Barnhill, Ohio

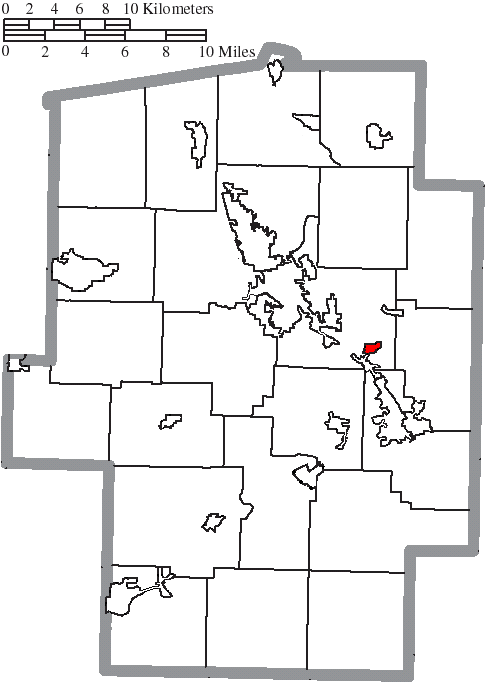
- Location of Barnhill in Tuscarawas County
- Coordinates: 40°27′00″N 81°22′18″W
- Country: United States
- State: Ohio
- County: Tuscarawas
- Township: Goshen

Government
  - Mayor: Mike Ohler

Area
  - Total: 0.38 sq mi (0.99 km^{2})
  - Land: 0.38 sq mi (0.99 km^{2})
  - Water: 0 sq mi (0.00 km^{2})
- Elevation: 896 ft (273 m)

Population (2020)
  - Total: 383
  - Estimate (2023): 376
  - Density: 1,003.5/sq mi (387.46/km^{2})
- Time zone: UTC-5 (Eastern (EST))
  - Summer (DST): UTC-4 (EDT)
- FIPS code: 39-03940
- GNIS feature ID: 2398035

Barnhill is a village in Tuscarawas County, Ohio, United States. The population was 383 at the 2020 census.

== Geography ==
According to the United States Census Bureau, the village has a total area of 0.36 square miles (0.93 km^{2}), all land.

== Demographics ==
Historical population
Census	Pop.	Note	%±
1890	969		—
1900	811		−16.3%
1910	506		−37.6%
1920	513		1.4%
1930	438		−14.6%
1940	394		−10.0%
1950	392		−0.5%
1960	350		−10.7%
1970	339		−3.1%
1980	327		−3.5%
1990	313		−4.3%
2000	364		16.3%
2010	396		8.8%
2020	383		−3.3%
2023 (est.)	376	▼	−1.8%
U.S. Decennial Census

=== 2010 census ===
As of the census of 2010, there were 396 people, 146 households, and 109 families living in the village. The population density was 1,100.0 inhabitants per square mile (424.7/km^{2}). There were 157 housing units at an average density of 436.1 per square mile (168.4/km^{2}). The racial makeup of the village was 98.2% White, 0.8% African American, 0.5% Native American, and 0.5% from two or more races. Hispanic or Latino of any race were 1.5% of the population.

There were 146 households, of which 37.0% had children under the age of 18 living with them, 47.9% were married couples living together, 13.7% had a female householder with no husband present, 13.0% had a male householder with no wife present, and 25.3% were non-families. 19.2% of all households were made up of individuals, and 8.2% had someone living alone who was 65 years of age or older. The average household size was 2.71 and the average family size was 2.97.

The median age in the village was 36.8 years. 27.5% of residents were under the age of 18; 6.6% were between the ages of 18 and 24; 28.3% were from 25 to 44; 25.6% were from 45 to 64; and 12.1% were 65 years of age or older. The gender makeup of the village was 50.3% male and 49.7% female.

=== 2000 census ===
As of the census of 2000, there were 364 people, 134 households, and 99 families living in the village. The population density was 984.8 inhabitants per square mile (380.2/km^{2}). There were 144 housing units at an average density of 389.6 per square mile (150.4/km^{2}). The racial makeup of the village was 98.35% White, 0.55% African American, and 1.10% from two or more races. Hispanic or Latino of any race were 0.27% of the population.

There were 134 households, out of which 34.3% had children under the age of 18 living with them, 54.5% were married couples living together, 16.4% had a female householder with no husband present, and 25.4% were non-families. 21.6% of all households were made up of individuals, and 9.0% had someone living alone who was 65 years of age or older. The average household size was 2.72 and the average family size was 3.07.

In the village, the population was spread out, with 28.8% under the age of 18, 8.8% from 18 to 24, 27.2% from 25 to 44, 26.1% from 45 to 64, and 9.1% who were 65 years of age or older. The median age was 32 years. For every 100 females there were 91.6 males. For every 100 females age 18 and over, there were 85.0 males.

The median income for a household in the village was $26,563, and the median income for a family was $30,625. Males had a median income of $28,750 versus $18,594 for females. The per capita income for the village was $12,374. About 13.9% of families and 19.5% of the population were below the poverty line, including 25.6% of those under age 18 and 11.1% of those age 65 or over.
