= Ohio State Route 16 =

East-west state highway in Ohio, US

State Route 16

Route information
- Maintained by ODOT
- Length: 70.46 mi (113.39 km)
- Existed: 1926–present

Major junctions
- West end: US 40 in Columbus
- US 23 / US 33 / US 62 / SR 3 in Columbus; I-71 in Columbus; I-270 in Columbus
- East end: US 36 near Coshocton

Location
- Country: United States
- State: Ohio
- Counties: Franklin, Licking, Muskingum, Coshocton

Highway system
- Ohio State Highway System; Interstate; US; State; Scenic
← SR 15	→ SR 17
← US 20	→ US 20A

State Route 16 (SR 16) is an east–west highway running from Columbus to Coshocton. Its western terminus is at Civic Center Drive (formerly U.S. Route 33) in Downtown Columbus, and its eastern terminus is at US 36. For much of its run through Licking County, and its entire run through Franklin County, State Route 16 follows the path of Columbus' Broad Street. West of Drexel Avenue in Bexley, the route is cosigned with U.S. Route 40 until its endpoint just east of the Scioto River.

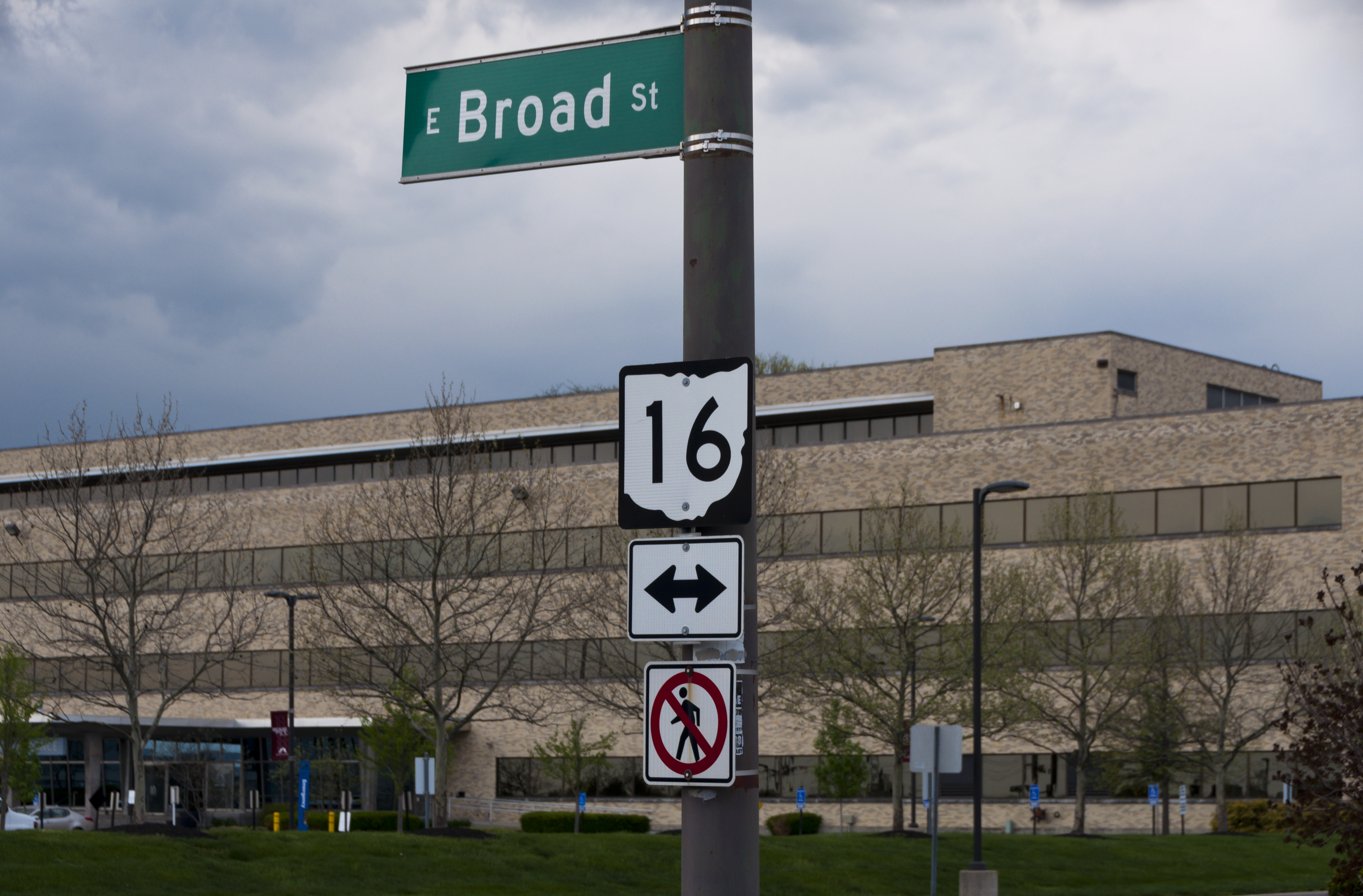
Ohio State Route 16 (Broad Street) Sign east of I-270

== History ==
The State Route 16 designation was originally applied to the routing carrying U.S. Route 422; when that route was created, SR 16 moved to the routing that had carried State Route 20. SR 16 was rerouted at its east end after the creation of US 36, then later truncated to Coshocton, with the eastern end becoming State Route 416.

== Major intersections ==
County	Location	mi	km	Exit	Destinations	Notes
Franklin	Columbus	0.00	0.00		US 40 west (Broad Street) / Civic Center Drive	Western end of US 40 concurrency
Franklin	Columbus	0.32	0.51		US 23 south / US 33 east / US 62 west / SR 3 south (3rd Street)	Western end of US 62 westbound concurrency
Franklin	Columbus	0.41	0.66		US 23 north / US 33 west / US 62 / SR 3 north (4th Street)	Western end of US 62 eastbound concurrency
Franklin	Columbus	1.08– 1.14	1.74– 1.83		I-71 to I-670 west – Cincinnati, Cleveland	Exit 108B (I-71)
Franklin	Columbus	2.85	4.59		US 62 east (Nelson Road)	Eastern end of US 62 concurrency
Franklin	Bexley	3.57	5.75		US 40 east (Drexel Avenue)	Eastern end of US 40 concurrency
Franklin	Whitehall	6.97	11.22		SR 317 (Hamilton Road)	
Franklin	Columbus	7.80– 8.31	12.55– 13.37		I-270 – Wheeling, W.Va., Cleveland	Exit 39 (I-270)
Licking	Pataskala	17.73	28.53		SR 310 south (South Main Street) to I-70 – Kirkersville	Western end of SR 310 concurrency
Licking	Pataskala	17.84	28.71		SR 310 north (Hazelton-Etna Road) / Township Road – Johnstown	Eastern end of SR 310 concurrency
Licking	Granville Township	26.56– 26.65	42.74– 42.89		SR 37 west to SR 161 – Johnstown, New Albany, Granville	Interchange, western end of SR 37 concurrency
Licking	Granville Township	26.65	42.89	Western end of freeway		
Licking	Granville Township	26.87– 27.23	43.24– 43.82	27	SR 37 east / SR 661 – Granville, Lancaster	Interchange; eastern end of SR 37 concurrency; southern terminus of SR 661
Licking	Granville Township	27.60	44.42		River Road (TR 131)	no access across SR 16 (right-in/right-out)
Licking	Granville–Newark line	29.24– 29.94	47.06– 48.18	29	Thornwood Crossing	
Licking	Newark	30.25	48.68	30	Granville Road	Westbound exit only
Licking	Newark	30.49– 31.17	49.07– 50.16	—	Country Club Drive / Church Street	Westbound entrance via West Church Street
Licking	Newark	31.96– 32.27	51.43– 51.93	—	North 21st Street	
Licking	Newark	32.50– 33.02	52.30– 53.14	—	SR 79 south – Heath	Western end of SR 79 concurrency
Licking	Newark	32.93	53.00	—	North 11th Street	Westbound exit; eastbound entrance
Licking	Newark	33.27– 33.63	53.54– 54.12	—	SR 13 (South 4th Street / North Hudson Avenue)	
Licking	Newark	34.07	54.83	—	North Buena Vista Street	Former eastbound exit and westbound entrance; closed in 2012
Licking	Newark	34.39– 34.64	55.35– 55.75	—	SR 79 north (North Cedar Street) – Nellie	Eastern end of SR 79 concurrency
Licking	Newark	35.24– 35.55	56.71– 57.21	—	O'Bannon Avenue	
Licking		36.15– 39.45	58.18– 63.49	At-grade intersections for 3.3 miles (5.3 km)		
Licking	Hanover Township	43.12– 43.42	69.39– 69.88		SR 146 east / CR 273 (Toboso Road) – Hanover, Zanesville	Western terminus of SR 146
Muskingum	Jackson Township	46.40– 46.94	74.67– 75.54	47	SR 586 – Mount Vernon, Frazeysburg, Zanesville	
Muskingum	Jackson Township	51.15– 52.09	82.32– 83.83	52	Old Riley Road – Frazeysburg	
Muskingum	Cass Township	55.46– 56.20	89.25– 90.45	56	SR 60 – Dresden, Zanesville, Warsaw	
Muskingum	Cass Township	57.08	91.86	Eastern end of freeway		
Coshocton	Jackson Township	67.16	108.08		SR 83 south – New Concord	Western end of SR 83 concurrency
Coshocton	Coshocton	69.81– 70.06	112.35– 112.75	70	SR 541 (West Chestnut Street) – Roscoe Village, Coshocton	
Coshocton	Tuscarawas Township	70.46	113.39		US 36 / SR 83 north to I-77 – Warsaw, Mount Vernon, Canal Lewisville	Eastern end of SR 83 concurrency
1.000 mi = 1.609 km; 1.000 km = 0.621 mi: Concurrency terminus; Incomplete access
