= New Philadelphia, Ohio =

- City
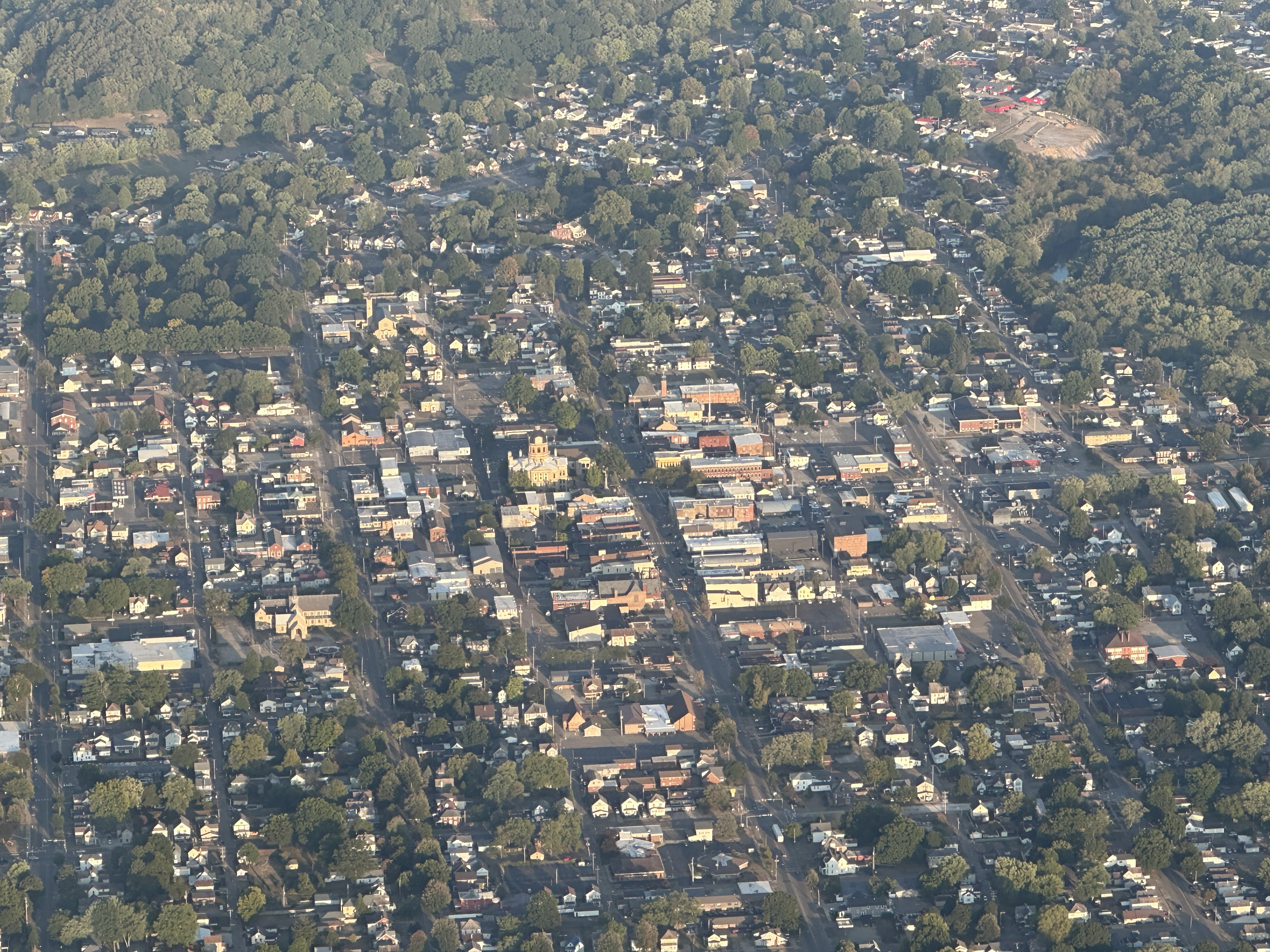
- Downtown New Philadelphia from an aerial perspective
- Interactive map of New Philadelphia, Ohio
- Location within Ohio Location within the United States
- Coordinates: 40°29′30″N 81°26′28″W
- Country: United States
- State: Ohio
- County: Tuscarawas
- Incorporated: February 12, 1833
- Named after: Philadelphia

Government
  - Mayor: Joel Day

Area
  - Total: 8.25 sq mi (21.37 km^{2})
  - Land: 8.15 sq mi (21.12 km^{2})
  - Water: 0.097 sq mi (0.25 km^{2})
- Elevation: 899 ft (274 m)

Population (2020)
  - Total: 17,677
  - Density: 2,168/sq mi (837.1/km^{2})
- Time zone: UTC-5 (Eastern (EST))
  - Summer (DST): UTC-4 (EDT)
- ZIP code: 44663
- Area code: 330
- FIPS code: 39-55216
- GNIS feature ID: 1087060
- Website: newphilaoh.com

New Philadelphia is a city in Tuscarawas County, Ohio, United States, and its county seat. The county's largest city, New Philadelphia lies along the Tuscarawas River. Its population was 17,677 at the 2020 census. It is a principal city in the New Philadelphia–Dover micropolitan area, about 70 miles (110 km) south of Cleveland.

In 1772, the Moravian Christians founded the community of Schoenbrunn in the area, which was the first settlement of the Northwest Territory. The pacifist Christian settlement was subsequently abandoned during the American Revolution. After the area was resettled in 1804, because of the presence of coal and clay, early industry in the city centered on mining interests and the manufacture of steel, canned goods, roofing tile, sewer pipe, bricks, vacuum cleaners, stovepipes, carriages, flour, brooms, and pressed, stamped, and enameled goods.

== History ==
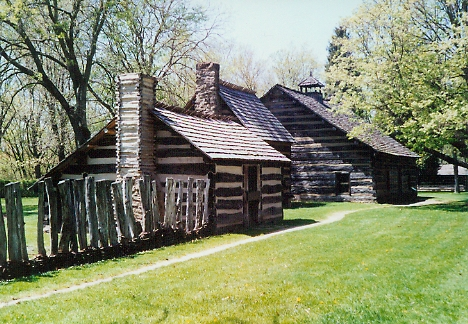
Reconstructed Moravian village of Schoenbrunn

The Moravian Church, under the leadership of David Zeisberger, founded Schoenbrunn ("beautiful spring"), also known as Welhik Tuppeek ("the best spring"), in 1772 as a Christian mission to the Delaware Indians. Schönbrunn was two miles south-east of present-day New Philadelphia, Ohio. The settlement grew to include 60 dwellings and more than 300 inhabitants, both Munsee and Germans, who drew up Ohio's first civil code and built its first Christian church and schoolhouse. Problems associated with the American Revolution prompted Schoenbrunn's closing in 1777.

John Knisely, who was from Pennsylvania, wanted to settle in a location where game was more plentiful and was welcomed by the Christian Indians of Goshen; he returned to Ohio in 1804 with his family and 33 other pioneers, hiring surveyor John Wells to plot out the modern city of New Philadelphia in the same grid style as Philadelphia, Pennsylvania.

In 1833, New Philadelphia contained county buildings, a printing office, several stores, and five taverns.

== Geography ==
New Philadelphia is located along the Tuscarawas River. It lies within the ecoregion of the Western Allegheny Plateau. According to the United States Census Bureau, the city has a total area of 8.39 square miles (21.73 km^{2}), of which 0.17 sq mi (0.44 km^{2}) is covered by water.

New Philadelphia's design was based on the design of Philadelphia, Pennsylvania. The two main streets in the city are High Avenue and Broadway, both of which were named after two main streets from Philadelphia, although Philadelphia's High Avenue was renamed Market Street in 1858. "The High Street" was the familiar name of the principal street in nearly every English town at the time Philadelphia was founded, and Broad Street is the closest street name in Philadelphia to Broadway.

=== Climate ===
New Philadelphia has a humid continental climate, Dfa on climate maps.

Climate data for New Philadelphia, Ohio (Harry Clever Field) 1991–2020 normals, extremes 1948–present
Month	Jan	Feb	Mar	Apr	May	Jun	Jul	Aug	Sep	Oct	Nov	Dec	Year
Record high °F (°C)	71 (22)	78 (26)	85 (29)	90 (32)	94 (34)	99 (37)	102 (39)	99 (37)	96 (36)	91 (33)	81 (27)	76 (24)	102 (39)
Mean daily maximum °F (°C)	36.9 (2.7)	40.2 (4.6)	50.0 (10.0)	63.1 (17.3)	72.7 (22.6)	80.4 (26.9)	83.8 (28.8)	82.4 (28.0)	76.2 (24.6)	64.5 (18.1)	51.9 (11.1)	41.3 (5.2)	61.9 (16.6)
Daily mean °F (°C)	28.9 (−1.7)	31.5 (−0.3)	40.0 (4.4)	51.3 (10.7)	61.1 (16.2)	69.5 (20.8)	73.1 (22.8)	71.3 (21.8)	64.7 (18.2)	53.5 (11.9)	42.5 (5.8)	33.8 (1.0)	51.8 (11.0)
Mean daily minimum °F (°C)	20.9 (−6.2)	22.7 (−5.2)	30.0 (−1.1)	39.5 (4.2)	49.5 (9.7)	58.5 (14.7)	62.5 (16.9)	60.3 (15.7)	53.2 (11.8)	42.4 (5.8)	33.2 (0.7)	26.3 (−3.2)	41.6 (5.3)
Record low °F (°C)	−22 (−30)	−15 (−26)	−5 (−21)	10 (−12)	20 (−7)	30 (−1)	40 (4)	36 (2)	30 (−1)	18 (−8)	4 (−16)	−16 (−27)	−22 (−30)
Average precipitation inches (mm)	2.62 (67)	2.27 (58)	3.05 (77)	3.78 (96)	3.77 (96)	4.23 (107)	3.74 (95)	3.65 (93)	2.97 (75)	3.16 (80)	2.70 (69)	2.73 (69)	38.67 (982)
Average precipitation days (≥ 0.01 in)	12.7	12.1	12.7	14.1	15.7	14.9	15.0	14.9	15.0	14.4	11.5	13.0	166.0
Source: NOAA

== Demographics ==
Historical population
Census	Pop.	Note	%±
1820	236		—
1850	1,413		—
1870	3,143		—
1880	3,070		−2.3%
1890	4,456		45.1%
1900	6,213		39.4%
1910	8,542		37.5%
1920	10,718		25.5%
1930	12,365		15.4%
1940	12,328		−0.3%
1950	12,948		5.0%
1960	14,241		10.0%
1970	15,184		6.6%
1980	16,921		11.4%
1990	15,698		−7.2%
2000	17,056		8.7%
2010	17,288		1.4%
2020	17,677		2.3%

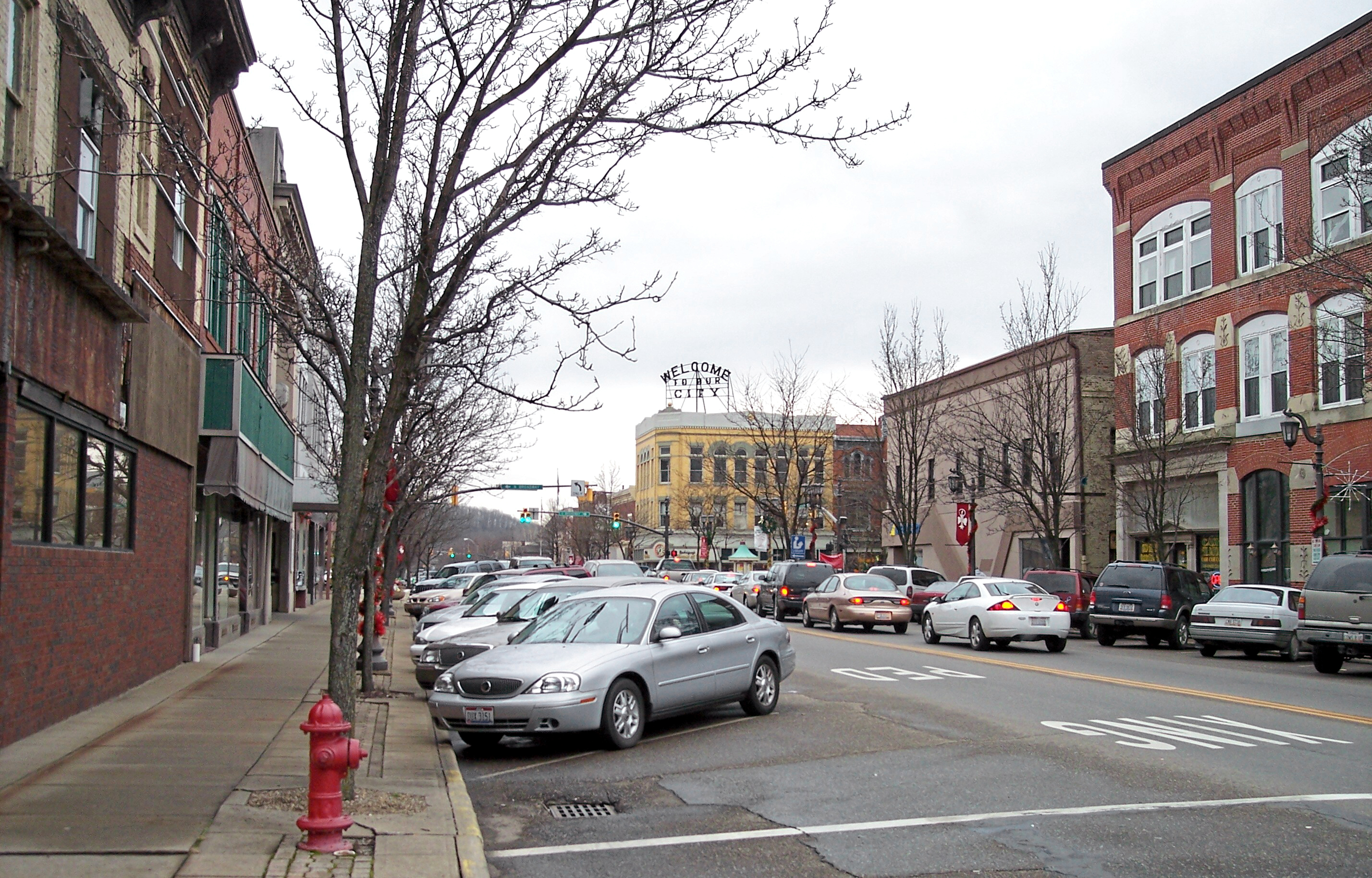
Downtown New Philadelphia

=== 2020 census ===
As of the 2020 census, New Philadelphia had a population of 17,677. The median age was 40.4 years, 21.6% of residents were under the age of 18, and 19.7% of residents were 65 years of age or older. For every 100 females there were 97.1 males, and for every 100 females age 18 and over there were 96.8 males age 18 and over.

99.2% of residents lived in urban areas, while 0.8% lived in rural areas.

There were 7,613 households in New Philadelphia, of which 25.7% had children under the age of 18 living in them. Of all households, 41.5% were married-couple households, 20.5% were households with a male householder and no spouse or partner present, and 28.9% were households with a female householder and no spouse or partner present. About 33.6% of all households were made up of individuals and 14.7% had someone living alone who was 65 years of age or older.

There were 8,122 housing units, of which 6.3% were vacant. The homeowner vacancy rate was 1.5% and the rental vacancy rate was 8.0%.

Racial composition as of the 2020 census
Race	Number	Percent
White	15,251	86.3%
Black or African American	197	1.1%
American Indian and Alaska Native	446	2.5%
Asian	120	0.7%
Native Hawaiian and Other Pacific Islander	2	0.0%
Some other race	770	4.4%
Two or more races	891	5.0%
Hispanic or Latino (of any race)	1,619	9.2%

=== 2000 census ===
As of the 2000 census, 17,056 people, 7,338 households, and 4,659 families lived in the city. The population density was 2,188.0 inhabitants per square mile (844.8/km^{2}). The 7,796 housing units had an average density of 1,000.1 per square mile (386.1/km^{2}). The racial makeup of the city was 96.89% White, 0.97% African American, 0.18% Native American, 0.49% Asian, 0.06% Pacific Islander, 0.49% from other races, and 0.93% from two or more races. Hispanics or Latinos of any race were 1.33% of the population.

Of the 7,338 households, 28.0% had children under 18 living with them, 48.9% were married couples living together, 11.3% had a female householder with no husband present, and 36.5% were not families. About 31.7% of all households were made up of individuals, and 13.2% had someone living alone who was 65 or older. The average household size was 2.30 and the average family size was 2.88.

In the city, the age distribution was 23.0% under 18, 9.4% from 18 to 24, 28.2% from 25 to 44, 23.7% from 45 to 64, and 15.8% who were 65 or older. The median age was 38 years. For every 100 females, there were 90.7 males. For every 100 females 18 and over, there were 87.1 males.

The median income for a household in the city was $33,235, and for a family was $42,896. Males had a median income of $32,157 versus $20,363 for females. The per capita income for the city was $18,745. About 7.7% of families and 10.2% of the population were below the poverty line, including 12.7% of those under 18 and 6.2% of those 65 or over.

== Economy ==
The city's main retail center is in and around New Towne Mall, which opened in 1988.

== Arts and culture ==
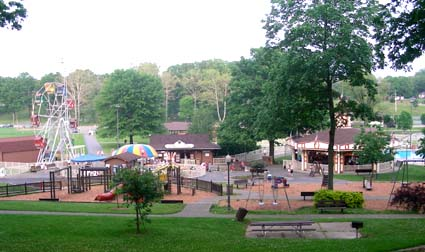
Tuscora Park in New Philadelphia features a carousel, Ferris wheel, and other rides.

Tuscora Park is a municipal park that features a carousel, ferris wheel, miniature railroad, roller coaster, swing ride, and kiddie rides, along with miniature golf, playgrounds, a swimming pool, and batting cages. Tuscora Park was originally built as a project of the Works Progress Administration; original stone work gates, paths, and retaining walls still adorn the park. The park is now the home of the Park Place Teen Center, a facility for high school students that provides entertainment of all types. It is managed by nonprofit RTY Inc. The organization frequently hires high school and college students to operate rides and sell tickets.

The Summer Showcase is held in the Tuscora Park Amphitheater. Events at the amphitheater include Sunday church services, plays, and concerts featuring local talent. The First Town Days, which includes a Grand Parade and fireworks display, runs on the weekend leading up to the Fourth of July. On the last day of the First Town Days festival, the park hosts the U.S. Air Force Band of Flight, which plays in the amphitheater.

Around 1940, New Philadelphia purchased the Herschell-Spillman carousel secondhand. It includes 36 carved wooden jumping horses, two chariots, and 428 individual lights. The center panels are adorned with 14 original oil paintings. Music is provided by a Wurlitzer #153 military band organ. The carousel is 40 feet in diameter and weighs 10 tons. It was manufactured in 1928 by the Spillman Manufacturing Company of North Tonawanda, New York. David Miller is well known for his 40 years of service on the Tuscora Park Carousel.

The Tuscarawas County Public Library in New Philadelphia is the main branch in its library system.

== Education ==
Children in New Philadelphia are served by the New Philadelphia City School District, which includes five elementary schools, one middle school, and New Philadelphia High School. The private Tuscarawas Central Catholic High School is also located in the city.

Kent State University at Tuscarawas, a regional campus of Kent State University, is located in the city. The campus covers 180 acres (73 ha) with four buildings; it opened in 1968 and enrolls about 2,000 students. The campus offers 11 bachelor's and 15 associate degree programs, and students can begin any of the nearly 300 degree programs offered by Kent State. Kent State Tuscarawas is unique in that it is locally owned, the only locally owned regional campus in Ohio. The Tuscarawas Performing Arts Center is also located on the KSU/T Campus.

== Infrastructure ==
=== Transportation ===
Interstate 77 passes west of New Philadelphia's city center. U.S. Route 250 passes through the west and south sides of New Philadelphia. Ohio State Route 39 and Ohio State Route 800 also run through the city.

Harry Clever Field is a city-owned airport in the southeastern part of the city, two nautical miles (2.3 mi; 3.7 km) southeast of the city center, adjacent to the Kent State University Tuscarawas Campus and Schoenbrunn Village. It is open to small aircraft and has maintenance and fueling services on site, as well as an airport courtesy car.

Into the early 1950s, the Baltimore and Ohio Railroad ran a six-day-a-week passenger train from Wheeling, West Virginia, through New Philadelphia en route to Akron and Cleveland.

== Notable people ==
- Elizabeth Dejeans, novelist
- A. Victor Donahey, former Ohio governor, U.S senator
- William Donahey, illustrator, The Teenie Weenies
- Norman Bel Geddes, industrial designer
- Cie Grant, former National Football League player for the New Orleans Saints
- Chad Hackenbracht, racing driver
- Woody Hayes, football coach for Ohio State University
- William Helmick, former member of the U.S House of Representatives
- Esther Nelson Karn, poet
- Emma C. Laugenour, philanthropist and social reformer
- Dave Leggett, football player for the Ohio State Buckeyes and the Chicago Cardinals
- John Mackey, composer
- Bill Moffit, composer
- William H. Nicklas, church architect
- Hugh Talbot Patrick, pioneering neurologist
- Lenny Simonetti, professional football player
- Victor Sterki, physician, malacologist, naturalist, research associate Carnegie Museum of Natural History
- J. Foster Wilkin, Ohio Supreme Court justice
- Robert Nugen Wilkin, federal judge and Ohio Supreme Court justice
