= Black band =

Black band or Blackband may refer to:

- Black armband, a signifier that the wearer is in mourning
- Black Band (anarchism), groups of militant anarchist miners
- Black band disease, a coral disease
- Black Band (landsknechts), a formation of 16th century mercenaries
- Blackband, Ohio, an unincorporated community in Tuscarawas County
- Black Band (resistance group), a German anarcho-syndicalist paramilitary organization
- Black Bands, a company of Italian mercenaries formed and commanded by Giovanni de' Medici during the Italian Wars
- Black (Bangladeshi band), a Bangladeshi rock band

== See also ==
- Black Hand (disambiguation)
