= Wainwright, Ohio =

Wainwright, Ohio may refer to:

- Wainwright, Jackson County, Ohio
- Wainwright, Tuscarawas County, Ohio
