= Postboy =

Postboy or Post boy may refer to:

- Postboy (ship), an Australian trading vessel 1874–1905
- Postboy, Ohio, US, an unincorporated community
- Postilion, a person who guides a horse-drawn coach while mounted on the horse
- Boston Post-Boy, an American newspaper 1734–1754
- Mailboy, a worker in a mailroom (US) or post room (UK)
