= Eastport =

Eastport may refer to:

== Places ==
=== Canada ===
- Eastport, Newfoundland and Labrador, Canada
- Eastport Peninsula, Newfoundland, Canada

=== United States ===
- Eastport, Idaho
- Eastport, Maine
- Maritime Republic of Eastport, known as simply Eastport, Annapolis, Maryland
- Eastport, Michigan
- Eastport, Mississippi
- Eastport, New York
- Eastport, Ohio, an unincorporated community

== Other uses ==
- Eastport-Kingsgate Border Crossing, between Canada and the USA
- USS Eastport (1862), a steamer
- EastPort UK, a trading name for the Great Yarmouth Port Company
- Piney Point phosphate plant, leased to industrial tenants under the name Eastport
