= Three Legs Town, Ohio =

- Ghost town
- Location within Ohio
- Coordinates: 40°25′38″N 81°22′08″W
- Country: United States
- State: Ohio
- County: Tuscarawas
- Elevation: 840 ft (260 m)
- Time zone: UTC-5 (Eastern (EST))
  - Summer (DST): UTC-4 (EDT)
- GNIS feature ID: 1054356

Three Legs Town was an unincorporated community in Tuscarawas County, Ohio, United States. It was located near the mouth of Stillwater Creek.

According to Native American legend, it was apparently named after the village's chief who had a third leg. After the chief was killed, the town was abandoned.
