= Columbia, Ohio =

Columbia, Ohio may refer to:

- Columbia, Tuscarawas County, Ohio, an unincorporated community
- Columbia, Williams County, Ohio, an unincorporated community
- Columbia Township, Hamilton County, Ohio
- Columbia Township, Lorain County, Ohio
- Columbia Township, Meigs County, Ohio
- Columbia, part of the now-merged Columbia-Tusculum, Cincinnati
