= Dennison, Ohio =

- Village
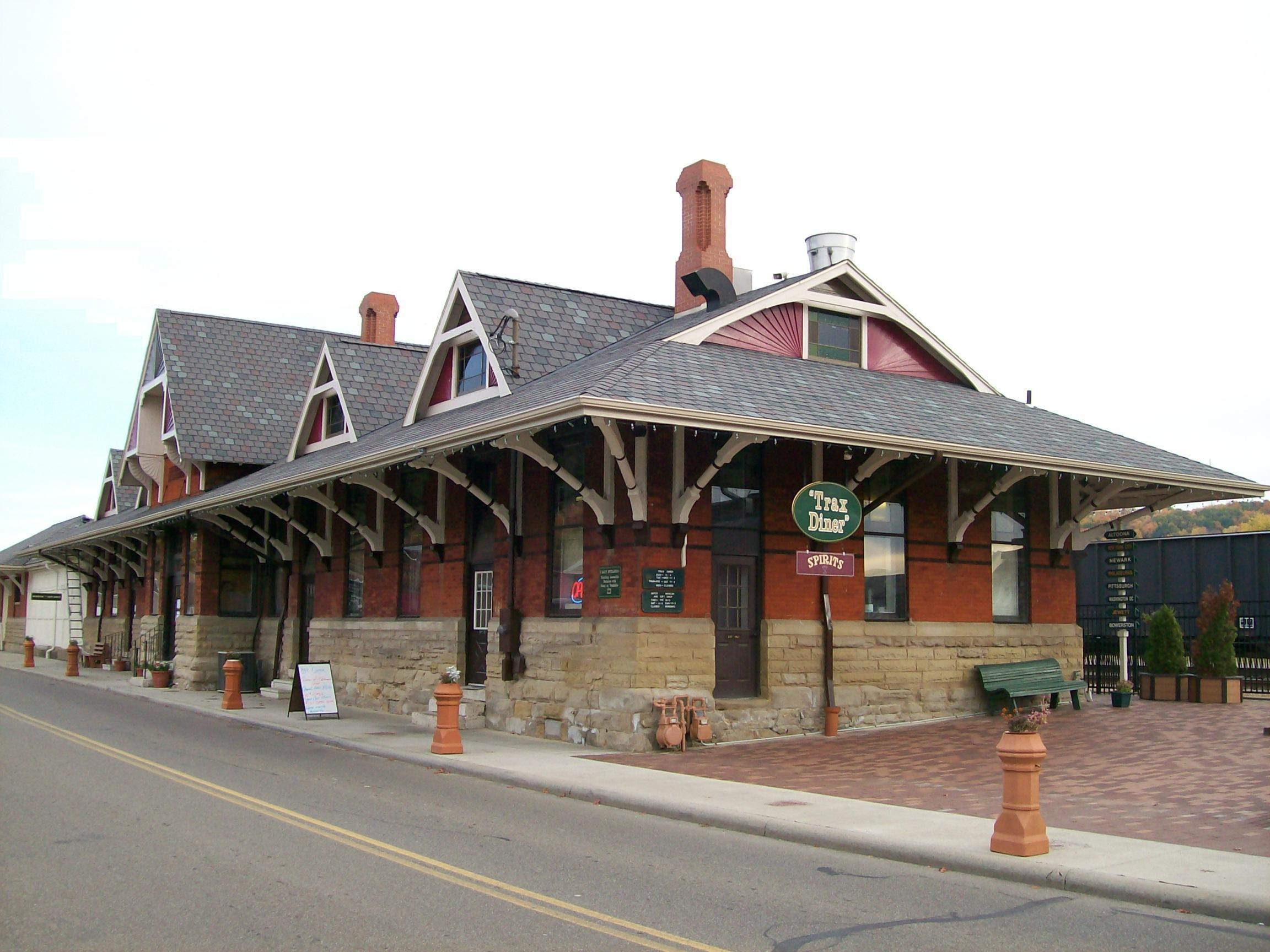
- The old Pennsylvania Railroad Depot, a National Historic Landmark

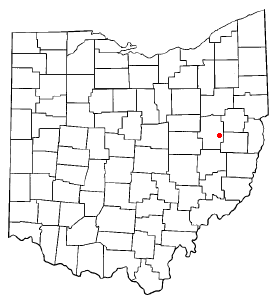
- Location of Dennison, Ohio

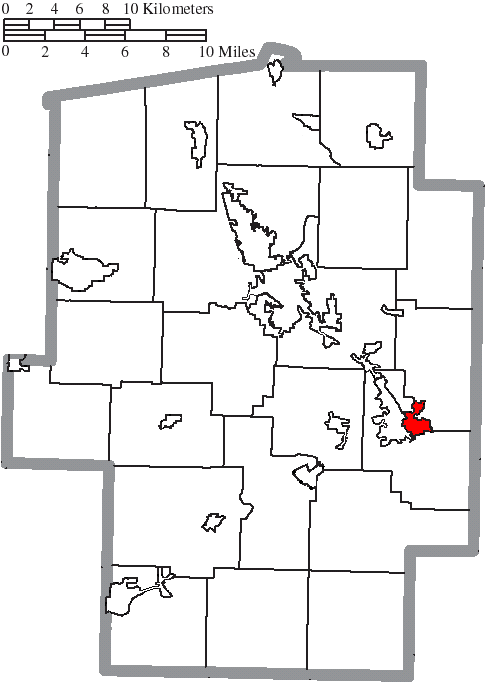
- Location of Dennison in Tuscarawas County
- Coordinates: 40°23′52″N 81°19′38″W
- Country: United States
- State: Ohio
- County: Tuscarawas
- Townships: Mill, Union

Area
  - Total: 1.38 sq mi (3.57 km^{2})
  - Land: 1.38 sq mi (3.57 km^{2})
  - Water: 0 sq mi (0.00 km^{2})
- Elevation: 863 ft (263 m)

Population (2020)
  - Total: 2,709
  - Estimate (2023): 2,653
  - Density: 1,962.7/sq mi (757.81/km^{2})
- Time zone: UTC-5 (Eastern (EST))
  - Summer (DST): UTC-4 (EDT)
- ZIP code: 44621
- Area code: 740
- FIPS code: 39-21714
- GNIS feature ID: 2398712
- Website: https://villageofdennison.org/

Dennison is a village in Tuscarawas County, Ohio, United States. The population was 2,709 at the 2020 census.

== History ==
The confluence of coal and railroads drove the development of Dennison. It is located at the midpoint between Pittsburgh and Columbus -- 100 miles (160 km) from each. At the time, locomotives needed water every 100 miles (160 km), so Dennison was a natural refilling location. The Dennison Coal Company had mines south of town.

In 1864, The Pittsburgh, Cincinnati & St. Louis Railway decided to locate the country's largest railroad shops and yards in Dennison. Dennison Land Company laid out the town of Dennison in 1865 and purchased land expressly for the town. The railyards spanned 40 acres (160,000 m^{2}). Demand for passenger service led to construction of a station in 1873. Thousands moved to the area for jobs in the roundhouses, turntables and foundries. At its peak, 3,000 people worked in the railyards. The Pennsylvania Railroad Company eventually subsumed the Pittsburgh, Cincinnati & St. Louis Railway.

The village incorporated in 1873, and was named for governor William Dennison.

During World War I, the Red Cross operated a canteen from a boxcar. Canteen volunteers prepared coffee and sandwiches for troops traveling through by train.

In 1922, a strike marked the end of the golden era of Dennison. During World War II, the Dennison Canteen operated from March 19, 1942, to April 8, 1946. Initially in a gas station on Center and Fifth Street, it moved to the depot restaurant and was dubbed "Dreamsville".

The last passenger train service stopped in 1968. The last freight train stop in Dennison was in 1982. Freight trains still roll through, but they no longer stop in Dennison.

== Geography ==
According to the United States Census Bureau, the village has a total area of 1.35 square miles (3.50 km^{2}), all land.

=== Climate ===
Climate data for Dennison, Ohio (1991–2020 normals, extremes 1909–present)
Month	Jan	Feb	Mar	Apr	May	Jun	Jul	Aug	Sep	Oct	Nov	Dec	Year
Record high °F (°C)	75 (24)	78 (26)	86 (30)	93 (34)	99 (37)	101 (38)	105 (41)	105 (41)	101 (38)	93 (34)	82 (28)	72 (22)	105 (41)
Mean daily maximum °F (°C)	35.7 (2.1)	39.6 (4.2)	49.6 (9.8)	62.6 (17.0)	73.0 (22.8)	81.1 (27.3)	84.8 (29.3)	83.3 (28.5)	76.5 (24.7)	64.2 (17.9)	51.4 (10.8)	40.5 (4.7)	61.9 (16.6)
Daily mean °F (°C)	27.6 (−2.4)	30.5 (−0.8)	38.9 (3.8)	50.2 (10.1)	60.7 (15.9)	69.1 (20.6)	73.1 (22.8)	71.4 (21.9)	64.2 (17.9)	52.5 (11.4)	41.8 (5.4)	32.9 (0.5)	51.1 (10.6)
Mean daily minimum °F (°C)	19.6 (−6.9)	21.4 (−5.9)	28.3 (−2.1)	37.7 (3.2)	48.4 (9.1)	57.1 (13.9)	61.4 (16.3)	59.4 (15.2)	51.9 (11.1)	40.8 (4.9)	32.2 (0.1)	25.2 (−3.8)	40.3 (4.6)
Record low °F (°C)	−33 (−36)	−22 (−30)	−11 (−24)	5 (−15)	18 (−8)	30 (−1)	38 (3)	33 (1)	26 (−3)	11 (−12)	−9 (−23)	−24 (−31)	−33 (−36)
Average precipitation inches (mm)	3.13 (80)	2.51 (64)	3.53 (90)	3.90 (99)	3.78 (96)	4.43 (113)	4.13 (105)	4.06 (103)	3.39 (86)	3.28 (83)	3.12 (79)	3.10 (79)	42.36 (1,076)
Average precipitation days (≥ 0.01 in)	11.5	9.8	11.8	13.5	14.1	12.1	10.6	9.6	9.2	10.7	10.6	11.7	135.2
Source: NOAA

== Demographics ==
Historical population
Census	Pop.	Note	%±
1870	828		—
1880	1,518		83.3%
1890	2,925		92.7%
1900	3,763		28.6%
1910	4,008		6.5%
1920	5,524		37.8%
1930	4,529		−18.0%
1940	4,413		−2.6%
1950	4,432		0.4%
1960	4,158		−6.2%
1970	3,506		−15.7%
1980	3,398		−3.1%
1990	3,282		−3.4%
2000	2,992		−8.8%
2010	2,655		−11.3%
2020	2,709		2.0%
2023 (est.)	2,653	▼	−2.1%
U.S. Decennial Census

=== 2010 census ===
As of the census of 2010, there were 2,655 people, 1,043 households, and 693 families living in the village. The population density was 1,966.7 inhabitants per square mile (759.3/km^{2}). There were 1,194 housing units at an average density of 884.4 per square mile (341.5/km^{2}). The racial makeup of the village was 96.8% White, 1.0% African American, 0.4% Native American, 0.2% Asian, 0.2% from other races, and 1.4% from two or more races. Hispanic or Latino of any race were 1.0% of the population.

There were 1,043 households, of which 34.7% had children under the age of 18 living with them, 45.5% were married couples living together, 14.7% had a female householder with no husband present, 6.2% had a male householder with no wife present, and 33.6% were non-families. 28.1% of all households were made up of individuals, and 13.5% had someone living alone who was 65 years of age or older. The average household size was 2.54 and the average family size was 3.09.

The median age in the village was 35.5 years. 26.6% of residents were under the age of 18; 8.3% were between the ages of 18 and 24; 27.7% were from 25 to 44; 25.3% were from 45 to 64; and 12.2% were 65 years of age or older. The gender makeup of the village was 48.8% male and 51.2% female.

=== 2000 census ===
As of the census of 2000, there were 2,992 people, 1,132 households, and 822 families living in the village. The population density was 2,174.5 inhabitants per square mile (839.6/km^{2}). There were 1,233 housing units at an average density of 896.1 per square mile (346.0/km^{2}). The racial makeup of the village was 96.19% White, 1.64% African American, 0.20% Native American, 0.10% Asian, 0.10% Pacific Islander, 0.37% from other races, and 1.40% from two or more races. Hispanic or Latino of any race were 1.00% of the population.

There were 1,132 households, out of which 36.7% had children under the age of 18 living with them, 52.8% were married couples living together, 14.0% had a female householder with no husband present, and 27.3% were non-families. 24.3% of all households were made up of individuals, and 12.7% had someone living alone who was 65 years of age or older. The average household size was 2.62 and the average family size was 3.09.

In the village, the population was spread out, with 28.1% under the age of 18, 10.0% from 18 to 24, 27.5% from 25 to 44, 20.3% from 45 to 64, and 14.1% who were 65 years of age or older. The median age was 34 years. For every 100 females there were 95.7 males. For every 100 females age 18 and over, there were 91.1 males.

The median income for a household in the village was $29,020, and the median income for a family was $32,168. Males had a median income of $27,679 versus $19,490 for females. The per capita income for the village was $13,389. About 12.3% of families and 17.2% of the population were below the poverty line, including 25.6% of those under age 18 and 12.5% of those age 65 or over.

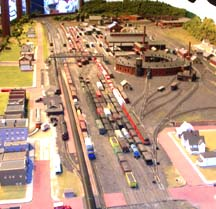
This model of the Dennison Depot and Railyard is a current exhibit at the Dennison Railroad Depot Museum.

== Notable people ==
- Greg DiDonato, politician
- C. Paul Stocker, inventor and engineer
