= Yorktown, Ohio =

Unincorporated community in Ohio, U.S.

Coordinates: 40°26′48″N 81°30′55″W

Yorktown is an unincorporated community in Tuscarawas County, in the U.S. state of Ohio.

== History ==
A post office called Yorktown was established in 1881, and remained in operation until 1884. Besides the post office, Yorktown had a station on the Marietta and Pittsburgh Railroad.
