= Lorain Products Corporation =

Telecommunications industry from Lorain, Ohio, USA

- Type: Manufacturing
- Industry: Telecommunications
- Founded: 1936; 90 years ago
- Founder: C. Paul Stocker
- Headquarters: Lorain, Ohio, U.S.
- Area served: Worldwide
- Products: Sub-Cycle; Flotrol
- Owner: C. Paul Stocker
- Number of employees: 1,000
- Parent: Reliance Electric

Lorain Products Corporation was a power equipment supplier located in Lorain, Ohio. The company was cofounded by inventor and electrical engineer, C. Paul Stocker in 1936. Stocker is credited with hundreds of patents, the most notable being the Sub-Cycle static frequency converter and Flotrol battery chargers and power supply units.

While considered small (at their height they employed roughly 1,000 people), the innovative and entrepreneurial company was competitive in the telecommunications and telephony field. They were known for making quality charging, ringing, and power supply equipment, and for being a company with integrity. The company grew from a small operation to having multiple factories not only in Lorain, but also Mexico and Canada. The company maintained contracts with the U.S. Government, Western Electric, General Telephone, and the Bell System.

In 1956, Stocker was awarded that status of Fellow by the American Institute of Electrical Engineers. In tandem with Stocker's retirement, the company was merged with Reliance Electric of Cleveland, Ohio in 1973. At the time, Lorain Product Corporations' annual sales were estimated at $25 million.

== The Stockers ==
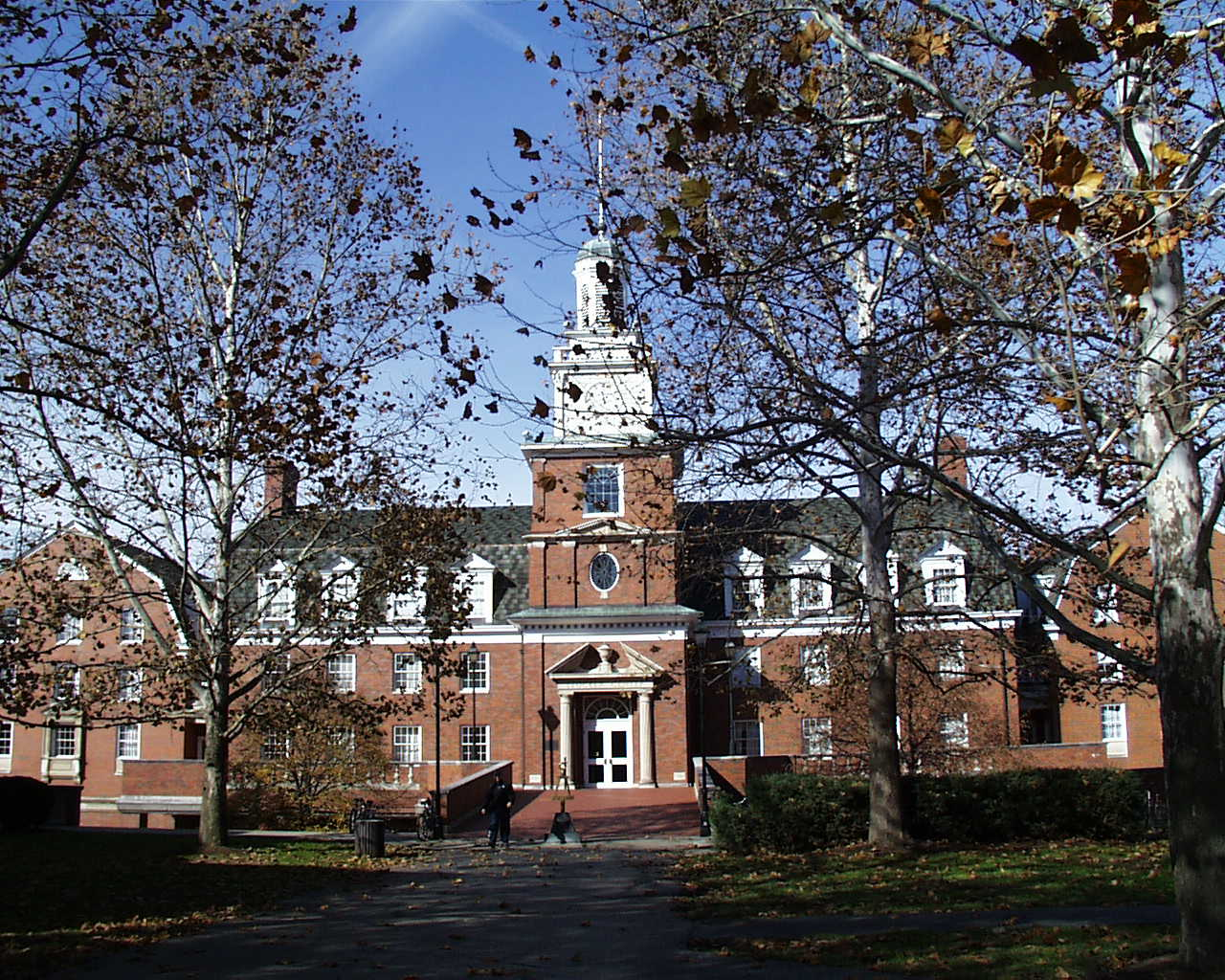
Stocker

C. Paul Stocker was born in Dennison, Ohio. Both graduates of Ohio University, C. Paul Stocker (1926) and his wife Beth Stocker (1928) made significant donations to their alma mater, and established the C. Paul and Beth K. Stocker Engineering and Technology Center in 1986. After C. Paul Stocker's passing, his wife Beth founded the Stocker Foundation in Lorain County, Ohio in 1979.
