= Wolf, Ohio =

Unincorporated community in Ohio, US

Coordinates: 40°19′18″N 81°34′17″W

Wolf is an unincorporated community in Tuscarawas County, in the U.S. state of Ohio.

== History ==
An old variant name was Wolfs Station. Wolf's Station was laid out in 1874 by Enoch G. Wolf, and named for him. A post office called Wolfs Station was established in 1874, the name was changed to Wolf in 1882, and the post office closed in 1940. Besides the post office, Wolf had a station on the Cleveland and Marietta Railroad.
