= Mount Tabor, Ohio =

Unincorporated community in Ohio, U.S.

Coordinates: 40°31′12″N 81°22′23″W

Mount Tabor is an unincorporated community in Tuscarawas County, in the U.S. state of Ohio.

== History ==
The first settlement at Mount Tabor was made in 1830. A variant name was Tabor. A post office called Tabor was established in 1850, and remained in operation until 1863.

Antebellum Tabor was described as "an Oberlin town", where "the people were all wonderfully devoted to the cause of free Kansas." That is, they were anti-slavery.
