= Goshen, Tuscarawas County, Ohio =

Unincorporated community in Ohio, U.S.

Coordinates: 40°26′37″N 81°24′35″W

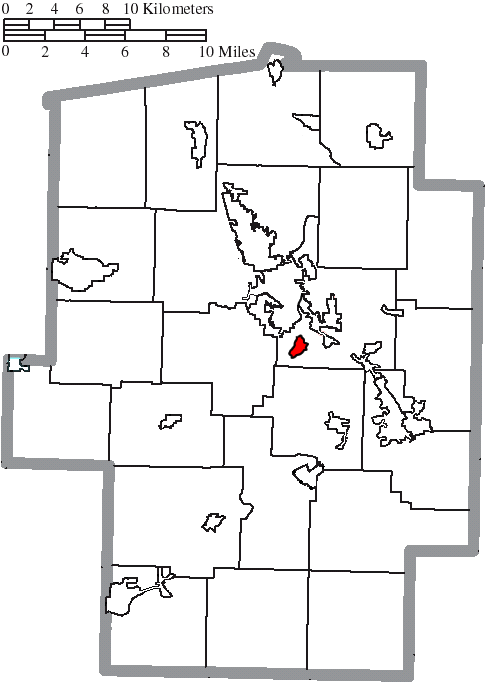
Location of Goshen, Ohio

Goshen is an unincorporated community in Tuscarawas County, in the U.S. state of Ohio.

== History ==
Goshen was originally built up chiefly by Germans. An old variant name of Goshen was Beidler. A post office called Beidler was established in 1888, and remained in operation until 1916.
