= Dennison station =

- Pennsylvania Railroad Depot And Baggage Room
- U.S. National Register of Historic Places
- U.S. National Historic Landmark
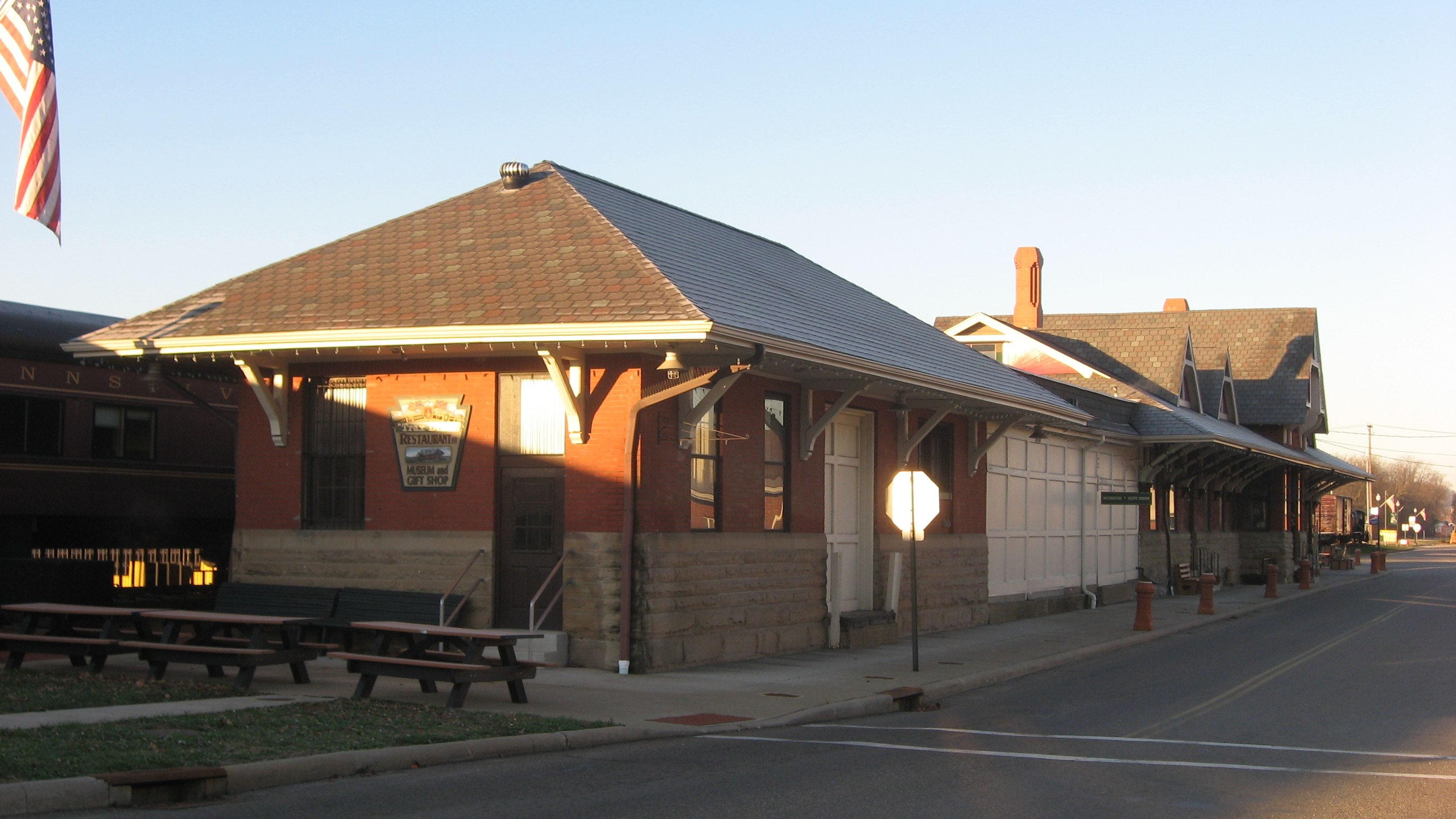

- Location within Ohio Location within the United States
- Location: 400 Center St., Dennison, Ohio
- Coordinates: 40°23′31″N 81°19′56″W
- Area: 2 acres (0.81 ha)
- Built by: Pennsylvania Railroad
- NRHP reference No.: 76001536

Significant dates
- Added to NRHP: September 8, 1976
- Designated NHL: June 17, 2011

Dennison is a historic railway station located at 400 Center Street in Dennison, Ohio. The depot was built between 1884 and 1900, and the baggage room was built circa 1912. The station is located midway between Dennison and Uhrichsville, Ohio, and served both communities.

The depot is best known as the home of the Dennison Depot Salvation Army Servicemen's Canteen during World War II. The canteen, which operated from 1942 through 1946, served refreshments to troop trains passing through Dennison. Dennison native Lucille Nussdorfer proposed the canteen; the Salvation Army and a citizens' committee operated it under the direction of Salvation Army Captain Edward Johnson. As Dennison was a division point on the Pennsylvania Railroad, every train that passed through Dennison stopped there; since the canteen workers vowed to serve every soldier passing through the station, the canteen ultimately served 1.3 million soldiers, 13% of the U.S. forces. 4,000 volunteers, the majority of them women from the surrounding area, worked the canteen during the war; the canteen was the third-largest Salvation Army canteen in the nation. The canteen became well known among soldiers, and its fame spread across the eastern U.S.; it appeared in newspapers as far away as Pittsfield, Massachusetts, was compared favorably to canteens in New York City and Chicago, and led Captain Johnson to become a recognizable figure on the East Coast. Soldiers nicknamed Dennison "Dreamsville, U.S.A.", a reference to an ideal small town in a Glenn Miller song.

The station was added to the National Register of Historic Places on September 8, 1976, as the Pennsylvania Railroad Depot and Baggage Room. It was designated as a National Historic Landmark on June 17, 2011. It is now a local history museum, the Dennison Railroad Depot Museum.

Preceding station	Pennsylvania Railroad	Following station
Gnadenhutten toward St. Louis	St. Louis – Pittsburgh	Bowerston toward Pittsburgh
