= Columbia, Tuscarawas County, Ohio =

Unincorporated community in Ohio, U.S.

Coordinates: 40°34′30″N 81°30′25″W

Columbia is an unincorporated community in Franklin Township and Dover Township, Tuscarawas County, Ohio Franklin Township, Dover Township, Tuscarawas County, Ohio, United States. It is located near Strasburg, Parral, and Dover. Despite part of it being in Franklin Township, Columbia uses Dover's Zip Code, 44622. Columbia was named after brick manufacturer that built the neighborhood for its workers in the early 20th century.
