= Henry Law Farm Historic District =

Historic district in Ohio, United States

- U.S. National Register of Historic Places
- U.S. Historic district
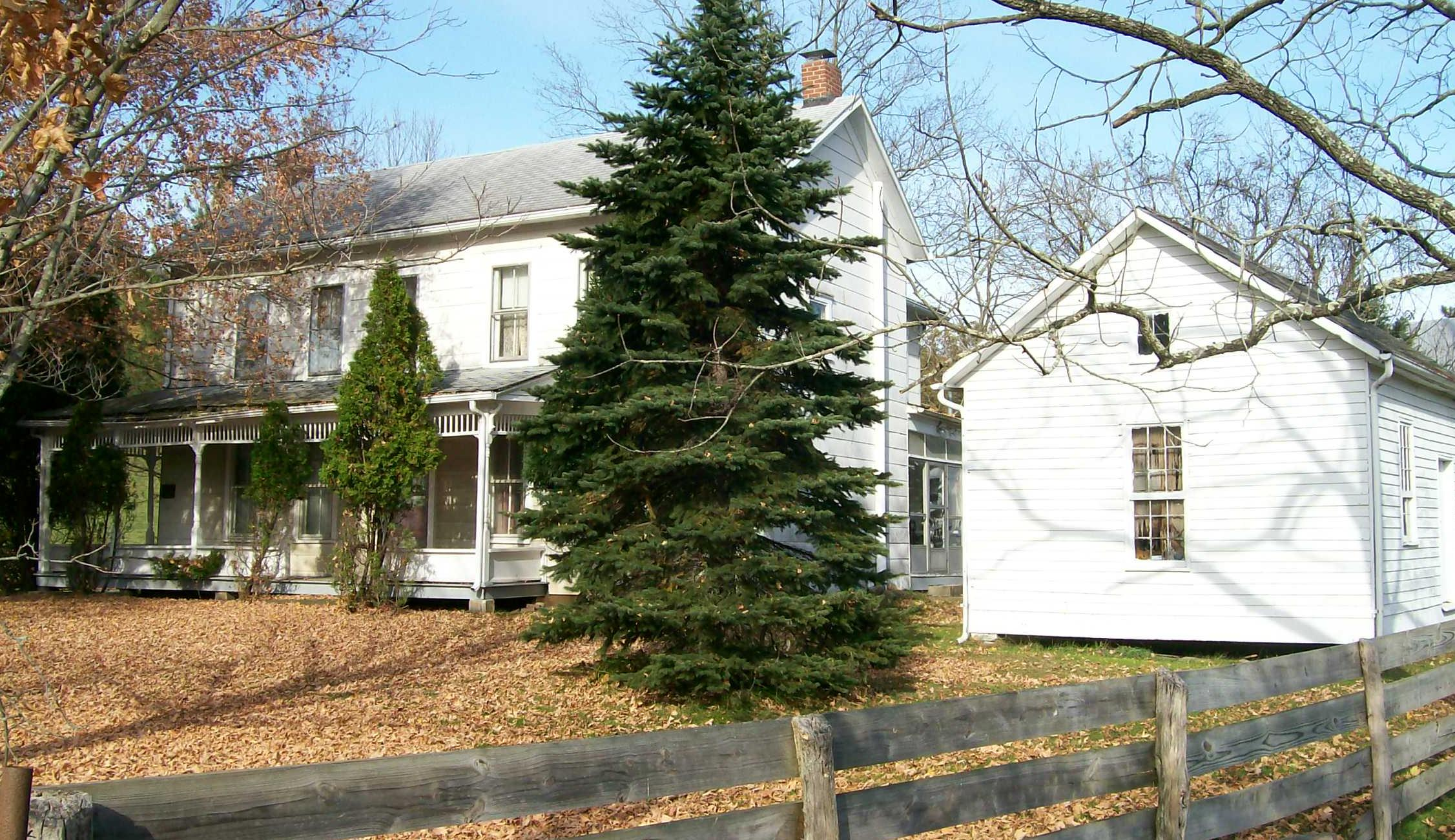
- The house on the Henry Law Farm.

- Location within Ohio Location within the United States
- Location: Monroe Township, Harrison County, Ohio, USA
- Nearest city: Uhrichsville, Ohio
- Coordinates: 40°22′19″N 81°14′26″W
- Area: 280 acres (110 ha)
- Built: 1846
- Architect: Henry Law
- Architectural style: Mid 19th Century Revival
- NRHP reference No.: 02000882
- Added to NRHP: August 22, 2002

The Henry Law Farm Historic District is a farmstead located at the junction of Reed Road and Plum Run Road near Tappan Lake in Harrison County, Ohio, United States. It was named a historic district and added to the National Register in 2002.

== History ==
Henry Law, a teacher originally from County Tyrone in Northern Ireland, emigrated to Harrison County in 1826 with his father and brother. Once settled he began his life as a farmer and raised cattle and sheep, as well as a multitude of crops. He met and married the former Elizabeth McMillan, also from Ireland.

Soon after their 1839 wedding, the Laws moved into a log cabin farmhouse at the source of Plum Run in Monroe Township, and in 1846 they relocated to the present property. They were the parents of eleven children, all of whom survived into adulthood, and of whom the oldest son (fourth oldest child) was John Quincy Law. John inherited the farm when his father died in 1869, and expanded the house when he added a kitchen in the downstairs and a living room and two bedrooms in the upstairs. John married Ella Scott, who was the grand daughter of Brigadier General Samuel Scott, a veteran of the War of 1812 and daughter of Josiah Scott and Rachel Vance Scott, who was a descendant of the Vans family from Dirleton Castle in Scotland and Laird Barnbarroch. The couple would raise six children.

John Quincy followed in his fathers footsteps and became a teacher, and later a member of the school board. He also served on the Board of Directors at the Dennison National Bank. When John Quincy died in 1927 the property passed to his third child, Frank Vance Law, but he didn't take title until 1931. Frank resided at the home until his death in 1956, and the property passed into the possession of his sister Eliza Rachel Law (Lida) and his brother Jay Quincy. Lida died shortly thereafter in 1958, and Jay became the sole owner.

Jay worked the land until his death in 1964, when he named his niece, Ella Virginia Reed Huss, as the heir of the Law Farm. Ella maintained the home and assisted in the formation of the Law Reed Huss Farm Foundation in 2001, and also aided in the petition to place the farm on the National Register, which it did so in the same year as her death, in 2002. The entry also placed the Ernest and Lena Reed Farm, as well as 280 acres (1.1 km^{2}) of land on the register as well. The farm is still functional and raises crops as well as Shorthorn and Angus cattle.
