= Glasgow, Tuscarawas County, Ohio =

Unincorporated community in Ohio, U.S.

Coordinates: 40°18′31″N 81°33′02″W

Glasgow is an unincorporated community in Tuscarawas County, in the U.S. state of Ohio.

== History ==
Glasgow had its start when Scottish investors built a blast furnace there. The town site was laid out and platted in 1873.
