= Warwick Township, Tuscarawas County, Ohio =

Township in Ohio, US

- Township
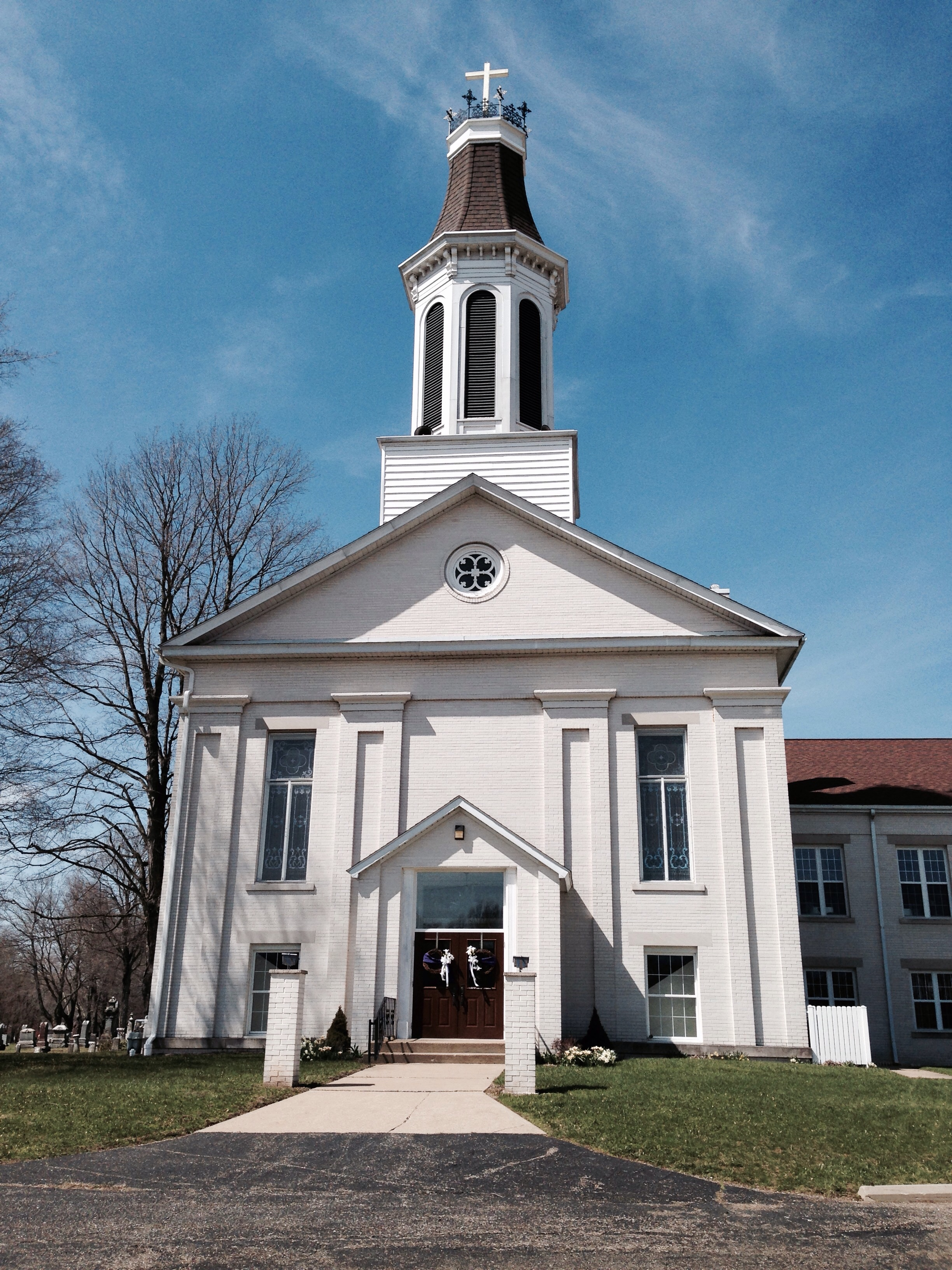
- Sharon Moravian Church, north of Tuscarawas

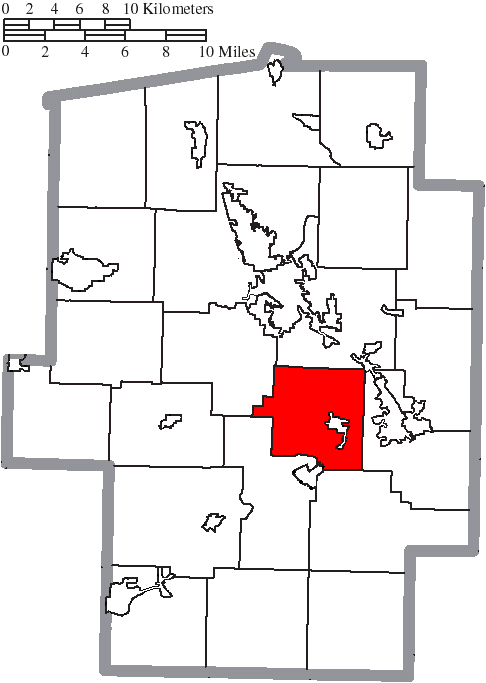
- Location of Warwick Township in Tuscarawas County
- Coordinates: 40°23′55″N 81°24′25″W
- Country: United States
- State: Ohio
- County: Tuscarawas

Area
  - Total: 21.9 sq mi (56.6 km^{2})
  - Land: 21.4 sq mi (55.5 km^{2})
  - Water: 0.42 sq mi (1.1 km^{2})
- Elevation: 1,020 ft (310 m)

Population (2020)
  - Total: 2,827
  - Density: 132/sq mi (50.9/km^{2})
- Time zone: UTC-5 (Eastern (EST))
  - Summer (DST): UTC-4 (EDT)
- FIPS code: 39-81060
- GNIS feature ID: 1087069

Warwick Township is one of the twenty-two townships of Tuscarawas County, Ohio, United States. The 2020 census found 2,827 people in the township.

== Geography ==
Located in the east central part of the county, it borders the following townships:

- Goshen Township - north
- Mill Township - east
- Rush Township - south
- Clay Township - southwest
- York Township - northwest

Several populated places are located in Warwick Township:

- Tuscarawas, a village in the center
- Wainwright, an unincorporated community in the north
- Part of Gnadenhutten, a village in the south

== Name and history ==
Warwick Township was established April 1, 1819. It is the only Warwick Township statewide.

== Government ==
The township is governed by a three-member board of trustees, who are elected in November of odd-numbered years to a four-year term beginning on the following January 1. Two are elected in the year after the presidential election and one is elected in the year before it. There is also an elected township fiscal officer, who serves a four-year term beginning on April 1 of the year after the election, which is held in November of the year before the presidential election. Vacancies in the fiscal officership or on the board of trustees are filled by the remaining trustees.
