= Monroe Township, Harrison County, Ohio =

Township in Ohio, US

- Township
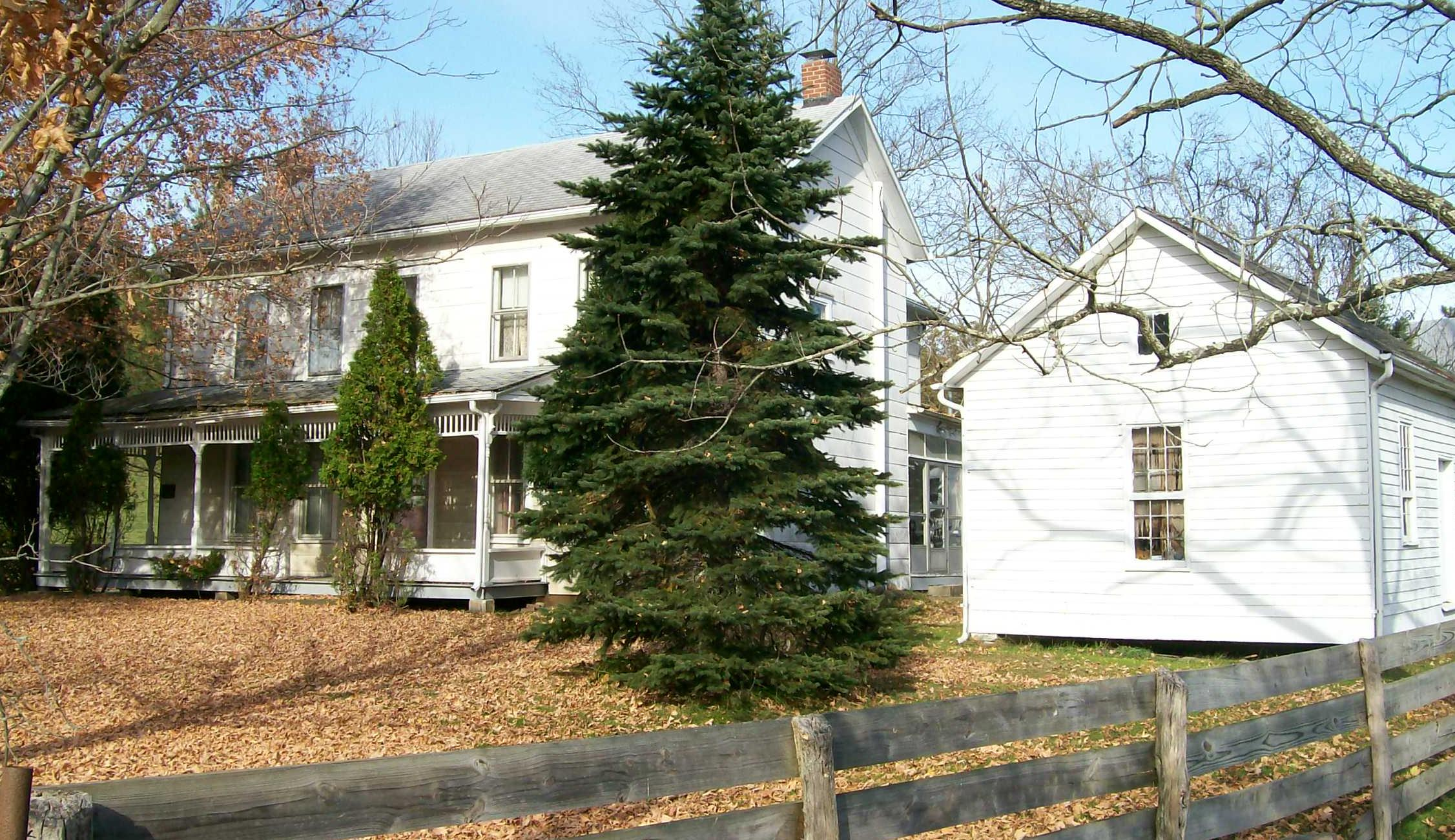
- Buildings at the Henry Law Farm

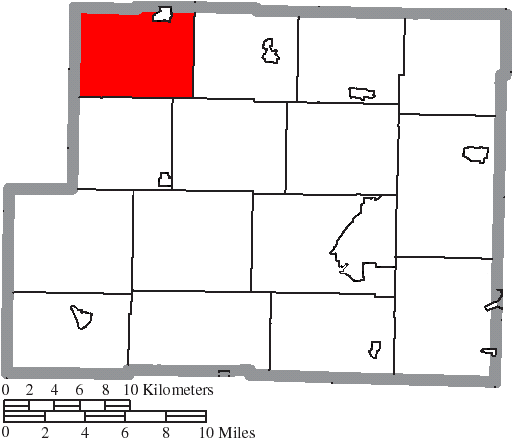
- Location of Monroe Township in Harrison County
- Coordinates: 40°23′48″N 81°12′24″W
- Country: United States
- State: Ohio
- County: Harrison

Area
  - Total: 26.3 sq mi (68.1 km^{2})
  - Land: 26.3 sq mi (68.1 km^{2})
  - Water: 0 sq mi (0.0 km^{2})
- Elevation: 1,191 ft (363 m)

Population (2020)
  - Total: 1,095
  - Density: 41.6/sq mi (16.1/km^{2})
- Time zone: UTC-5 (Eastern (EST))
  - Summer (DST): UTC-4 (EDT)
- FIPS code: 39-51394
- GNIS feature ID: 1086278

Monroe Township is one of the fifteen townships of Harrison County, Ohio, United States. The 2020 census found 1,095 people in the township.

== Geography ==
Located in the northwestern corner of the county, it borders the following townships:

- Orange Township, Carroll County - north
- Perry Township, Carroll County - northeast
- North Township - east
- Stock Township - southeast
- Franklin Township - south
- Mill Township, Tuscarawas County - southwest
- Union Township, Tuscarawas County - northwest

The village of Bowerston is located in northeastern Monroe Township.

== Name and history ==
It is one of twenty-two Monroe Townships statewide.

== Government ==
The township is governed by a three-member board of trustees, who are elected in November of odd-numbered years to a four-year term beginning on the following January 1. Two are elected in the year after the presidential election and one is elected in the year before it. There is also an elected township fiscal officer, who serves a four-year term beginning on April 1 of the year after the election, which is held in November of the year before the presidential election. Vacancies in the fiscal officership or on the board of trustees are filled by the remaining trustees.
