= Lock Seventeen, Ohio =

Unincorporated community in Ohio, U.S.

Coordinates: 40°21′22″N 81°27′20″W

Lock Seventeen is an unincorporated community in Tuscarawas County, in the U.S. state of Ohio.

== History ==
Lock Seventeen had its start when a lock was built on the nearby Ohio and Erie Canal in 1829. The lock was known as Lock Seventeen, hence the name. A post office called Lock Seventeen was established in 1862, and remained in operation until 1895.
