= Postboy Creek =

Stream in Ohio, U.S.

Coordinates: 40°13′28″N 81°34′58″W

Postboy Creek is a stream in the U.S. state of Ohio. The nearby community of Postboy, Ohio takes its name from the creek.

Postboy Creek was named in memory of William Cartmell, a young mail carrier (post boy). Cartmell was murdered in a robbery in 1825, a crime for which the perpetrator was later hanged.

== See also ==
- List of rivers of Ohio
