= Hartwood, Ohio =

Unincorporated community in Ohio, U.S.

Coordinates: 40°16′43″N 81°29′02″W

Hartwood is an unincorporated community in Tuscarawas County, in the U.S. state of Ohio.

== History ==
A post office called Hartwood was established in 1900, and discontinued in 1902. Besides the post office, Hartwood has the Hartwood Methodist Protestant Church, founded in the 1830s.
