= Union Township, Tuscarawas County, Ohio =

Township in Ohio, US

- Township
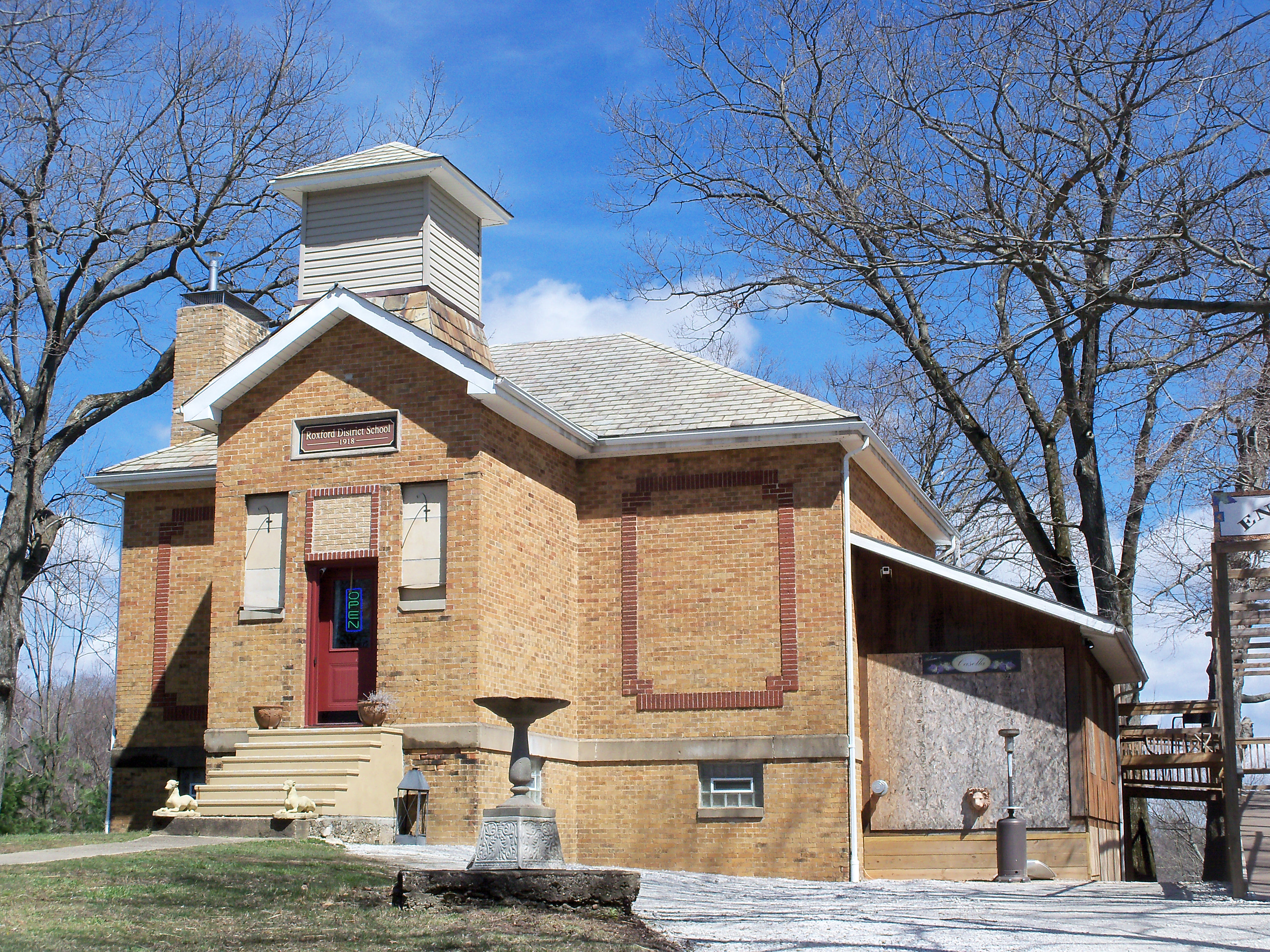
- Former Roxford District School, now a winery

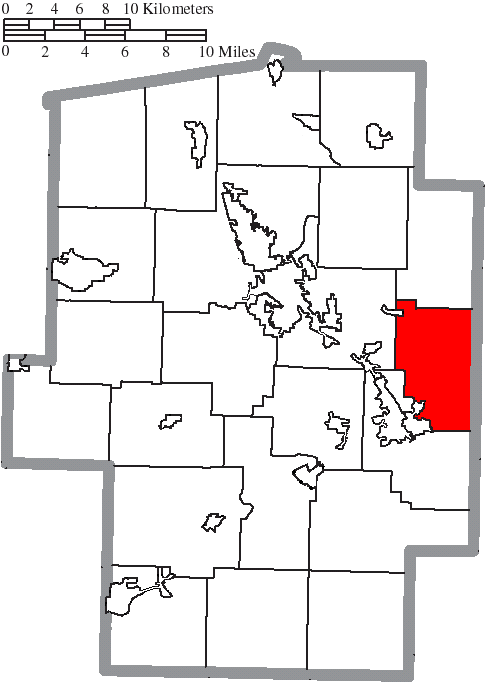
- Location of Union Township in Tuscarawas County
- Coordinates: 40°26′4″N 81°18′41″W
- Country: United States
- State: Ohio
- County: Tuscarawas

Area
  - Total: 22.2 sq mi (57.4 km^{2})
  - Land: 22.2 sq mi (57.4 km^{2})
  - Water: 0 sq mi (0.0 km^{2})
- Elevation: 988 ft (301 m)

Population (2020)
  - Total: 1,449
  - Density: 65.4/sq mi (25.2/km^{2})
- Time zone: UTC-5 (Eastern (EST))
  - Summer (DST): UTC-4 (EDT)
- FIPS code: 39-78568
- GNIS feature ID: 1087067

Union Township is one of the twenty-two townships of Tuscarawas County, Ohio, United States. The 2020 census found 1,449 people in the township.

== Geography ==
Located in the eastern part of the county, it borders the following townships:

- Warren Township - north
- Orange Township, Carroll County - northeast
- Monroe Township, Harrison County - southeast
- Mill Township - south
- Goshen Township - west

Two villages are located in Union Township: part of Dennison in the southwest, and part of Roswell in the northwest.

== Name and history ==
It is one of twenty-seven Union Townships statewide.

== Government ==
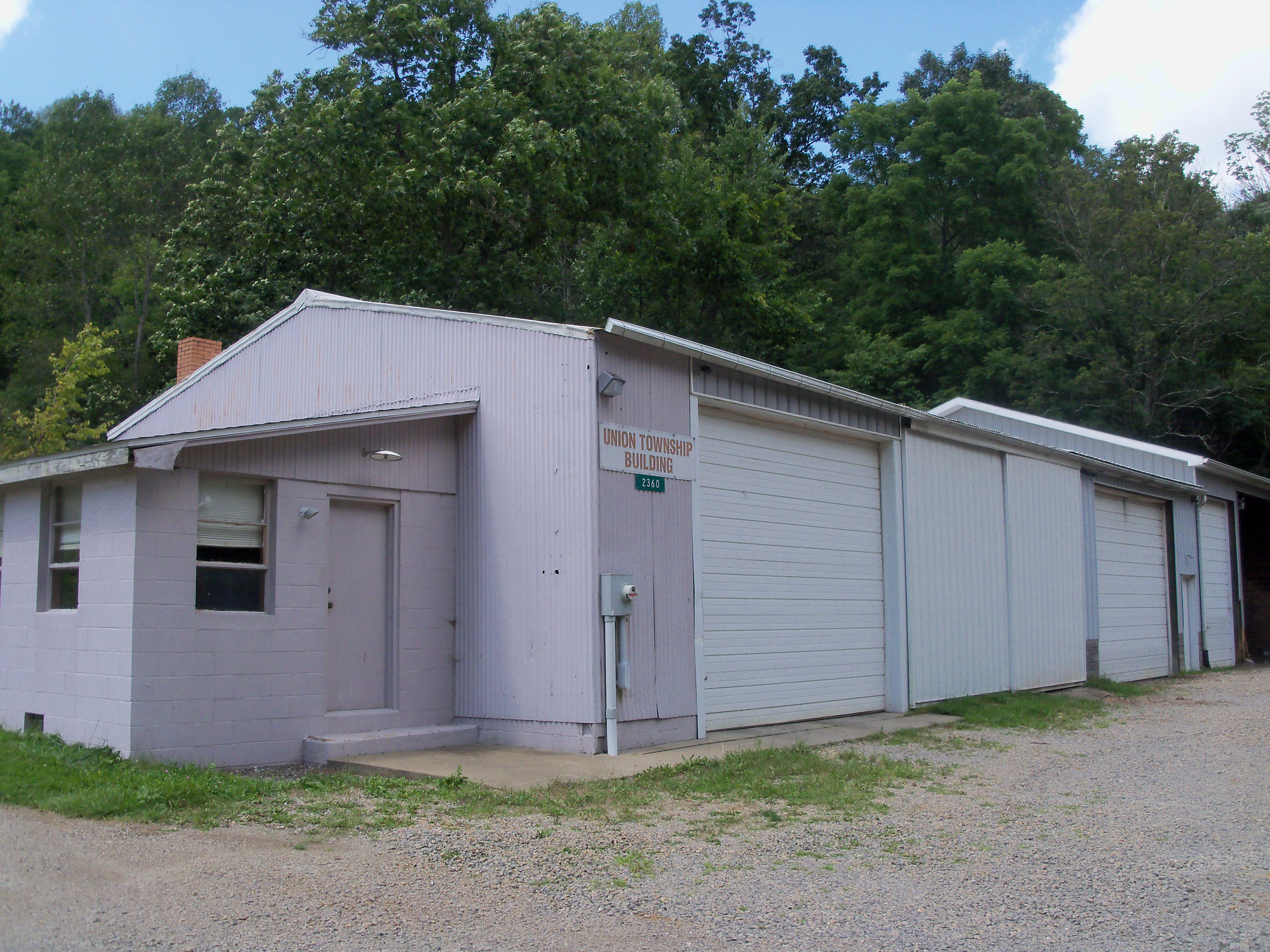
Union Township Town Hall

The township is governed by a three-member board of trustees, who are elected in November of odd-numbered years to a four-year term beginning on the following January 1. Two are elected in the year after the presidential election and one is elected in the year before it. There is also an elected township fiscal officer, who serves a four-year term beginning on April 1 of the year after the election, which is held in November of the year before the presidential election. Vacancies in the fiscal officership or on the board of trustees are filled by the remaining trustees.
