= Bernice, Ohio =

- Unincorporated community
- Location within Ohio Location within the United States
- Coordinates: 40°15′52″N 81°31′09″W
- Country: United States
- State: Ohio
- County: Tuscarawas
- Elevation: 824 ft (251 m)
- Time zone: UTC-5 (Eastern (EST))
  - Summer (DST): UTC-4 (EDT)
- Area code: 330
- GNIS feature ID: 1064423

Bernice is an unincorporated community in rural Washington Township, Tuscarawas County, Ohio, United States. It is located on State Route 258 outside Newcomerstown. It is intersected by Washington Township's Dog and Sleepy Elm roads. Dunlap Creek, a tributary of the Tuscarawas River, flows through Bernice.
