= Goshen Township, Tuscarawas County, Ohio =

Township in Ohio, US

- Township
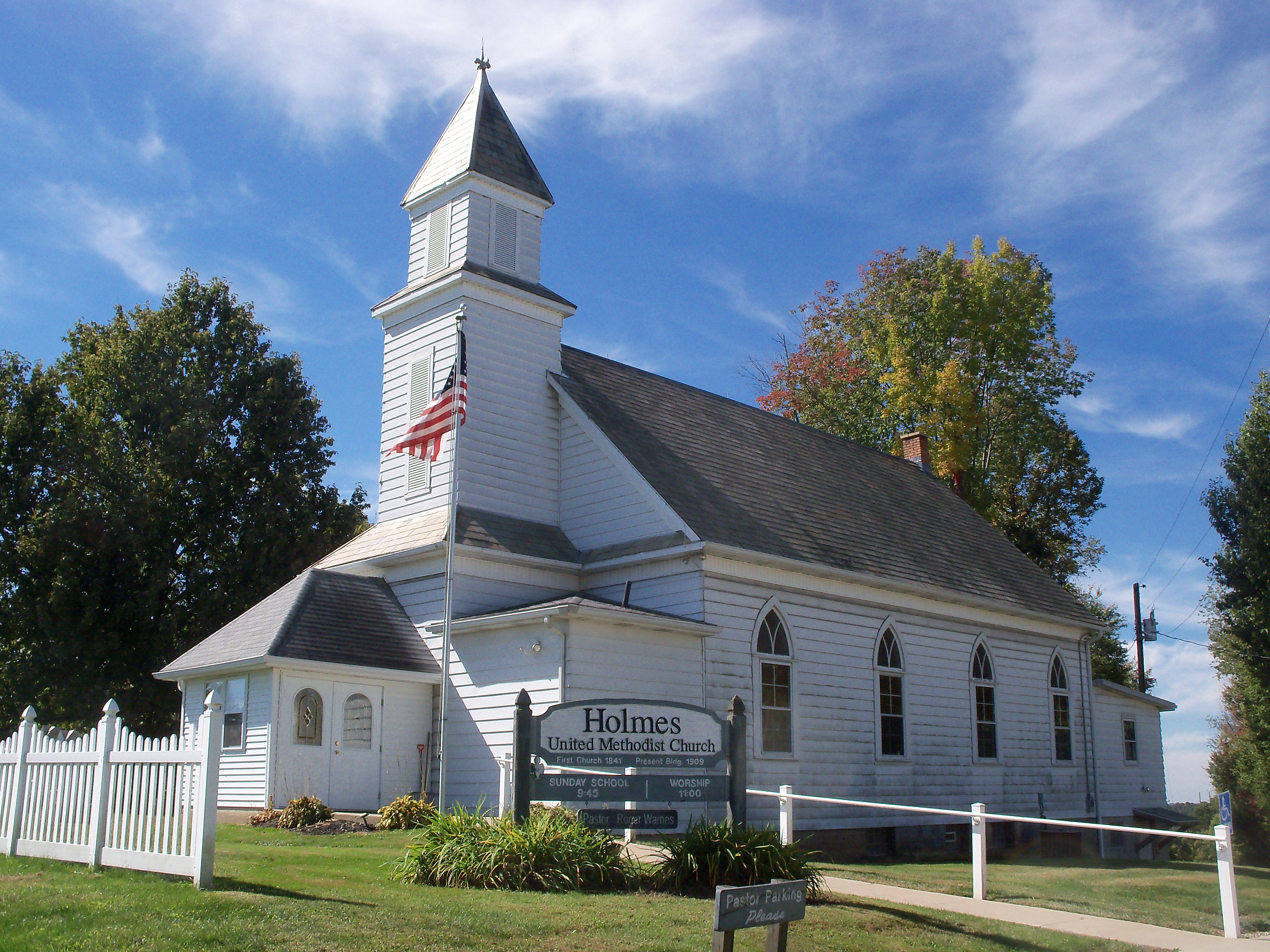
- Holmes United Methodist Church

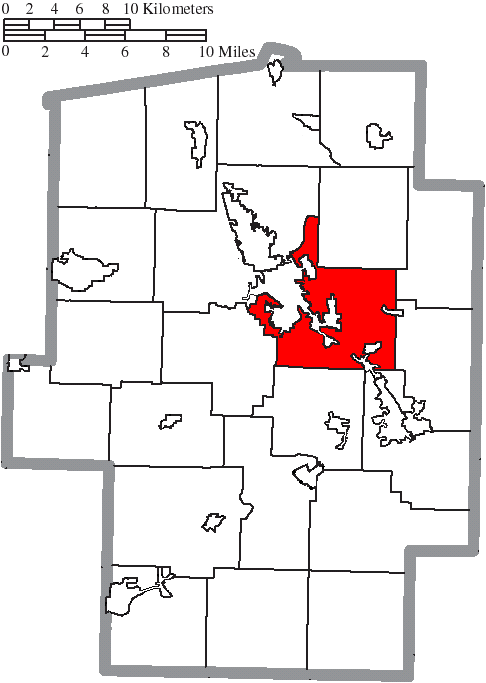
- Location of Goshen Township in Tuscarawas County
- Coordinates: 40°27′56″N 81°24′28″W
- Country: United States
- State: Ohio
- County: Tuscarawas

Area
  - Total: 27.1 sq mi (70.3 km^{2})
  - Land: 26.8 sq mi (69.3 km^{2})
  - Water: 0.39 sq mi (1.0 km^{2})
- Elevation: 955 ft (291 m)

Population (2020)
  - Total: 5,081
  - Density: 190/sq mi (73.3/km^{2})
- Time zone: UTC-5 (Eastern (EST))
  - Summer (DST): UTC-4 (EDT)
- FIPS code: 39-31066
- GNIS feature ID: 1087056

Goshen Township is one of the twenty-two townships of Tuscarawas County, Ohio, United States. The 2020 census found 5,081 people in the township.

== Geography ==
Located in the east central part of the county, it borders the following townships:

- Fairfield Township - north
- Warren Township - northeast
- Union Township - east
- Mill Township - southeast
- Warwick Township - south
- York Township - southwest
- Dover Township - northwest

Several municipalities are located in Goshen Township:

- The city of New Philadelphia, the county seat of Tuscarawas County, in the center and northwest
- Part of the village of Barnhill, in the southeast
- Part of the village of Midvale, in the southeast
- Part of the village of Roswell, in the east

== Name and history ==
Goshen Township is named after the Land of Goshen, whose name was meant to imply fertility of the soil. It is one of seven Goshen Townships statewide. The township was established in 1808.

Within the township's boundaries is the old village of Goshen which was one of the settlements of the Christian Munsee.

== Government ==
The township is governed by a three-member board of trustees, who are elected in November of odd-numbered years to a four-year term beginning on the following January 1. Two are elected in the year after the presidential election and one is elected in the year before it. There is also an elected township fiscal officer, who serves a four-year term beginning on April 1 of the year after the election, which is held in November of the year before the presidential election. Vacancies in the fiscal officership or on the board of trustees are filled by the remaining trustees. The current trustees are Bob Hausermann, Lisa Allen, and Dan Hodges, and the fiscal officer is Laura Engled.
