= Rockford, Tuscarawas County, Ohio =

Unincorporated community in Ohio, U.S.

Coordinates: 40°28′37″N 81°18′30″W

Rockford is an unincorporated community in Tuscarawas County, in the U.S. state of Ohio.

== History ==
Rockford was laid out and platted in 1816.
