= Barrs Mills, Ohio =

Unincorporated community in Ohio, U.S.

Coordinates: 40°32′55″N 81°37′24″W

Barrs Mills is an unincorporated community in Tuscarawas County, in the U.S. state of Ohio.

== History ==
A post office called Barrs Mills was established in 1873, and remained in operation until 1956. The namesake Barr's Mills was a mill operated by David Barr on Sugar Creek.
