= Mill Township, Tuscarawas County, Ohio =

Township in Ohio, US

- Township
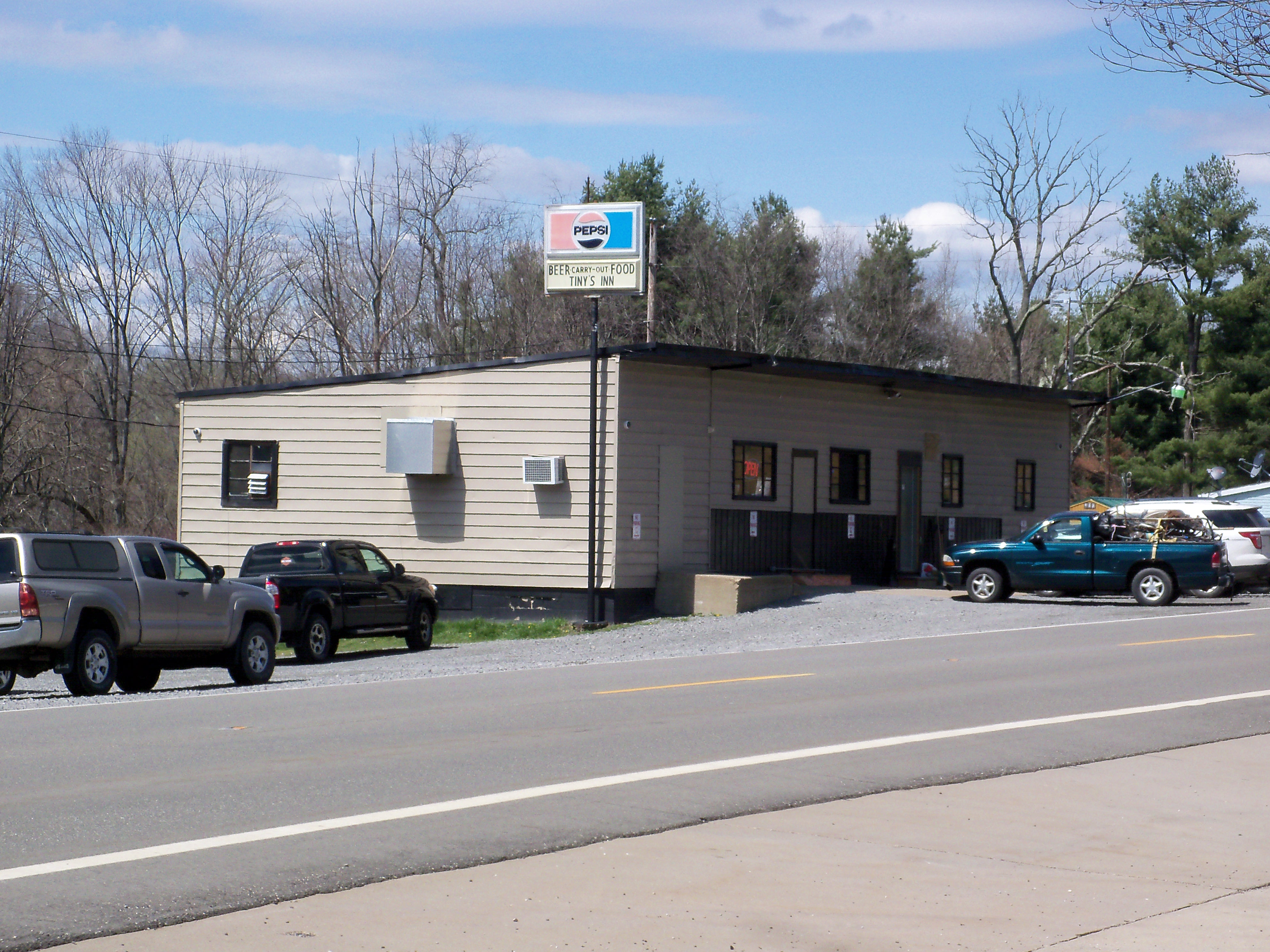
- Roadhouse on Route 800

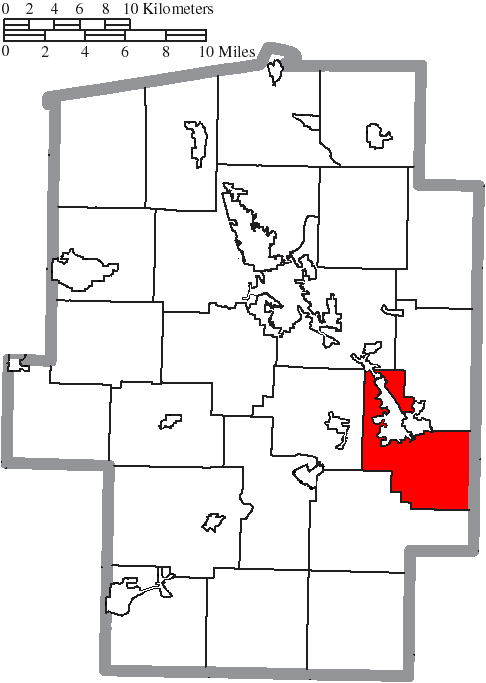
- Location of Mill Township in Tuscarawas County
- Coordinates: 40°23′36″N 81°20′33″W
- Country: United States
- State: Ohio
- County: Tuscarawas

Area
  - Total: 25.6 sq mi (66.2 km^{2})
  - Land: 25.5 sq mi (66.0 km^{2})
  - Water: 0.077 sq mi (0.2 km^{2})
- Elevation: 860 ft (262 m)

Population (2020)
  - Total: 9,782
  - Density: 384/sq mi (148.2/km^{2})
- Time zone: UTC-5 (Eastern (EST))
  - Summer (DST): UTC-4 (EDT)
- FIPS code: 39-50232
- GNIS feature ID: 1087059

Mill Township is one of the twenty-two townships of Tuscarawas County, Ohio, United States. The 2020 census found 9,782 people in the township

== Geography ==
Located in the eastern part of the county, it borders the following townships:

- Union Township - north
- Monroe Township, Harrison County - northeast
- Franklin Township, Harrison County - southeast
- Rush Township - south
- Warwick Township - west
- Goshen Township - northwest

Several municipalities are located in Mill Township:

- Part of the village of Dennison, in the north
- Part of the village of Midvale, in the northwest
- The city of Uhrichsville, in the center

== Name and history ==
It is the only Mill Township statewide.

== Government ==
The township is governed by a three-member board of trustees, who are elected in November of odd-numbered years to a four-year term beginning on the following January 1. Two are elected in the year after the presidential election and one is elected in the year before it. There is also an elected township fiscal officer, who serves a four-year term beginning on April 1 of the year after the election, which is held in November of the year before the presidential election. Vacancies in the fiscal officership or on the board of trustees are filled by the remaining trustees.
