= Roswell, Ohio =

- Village
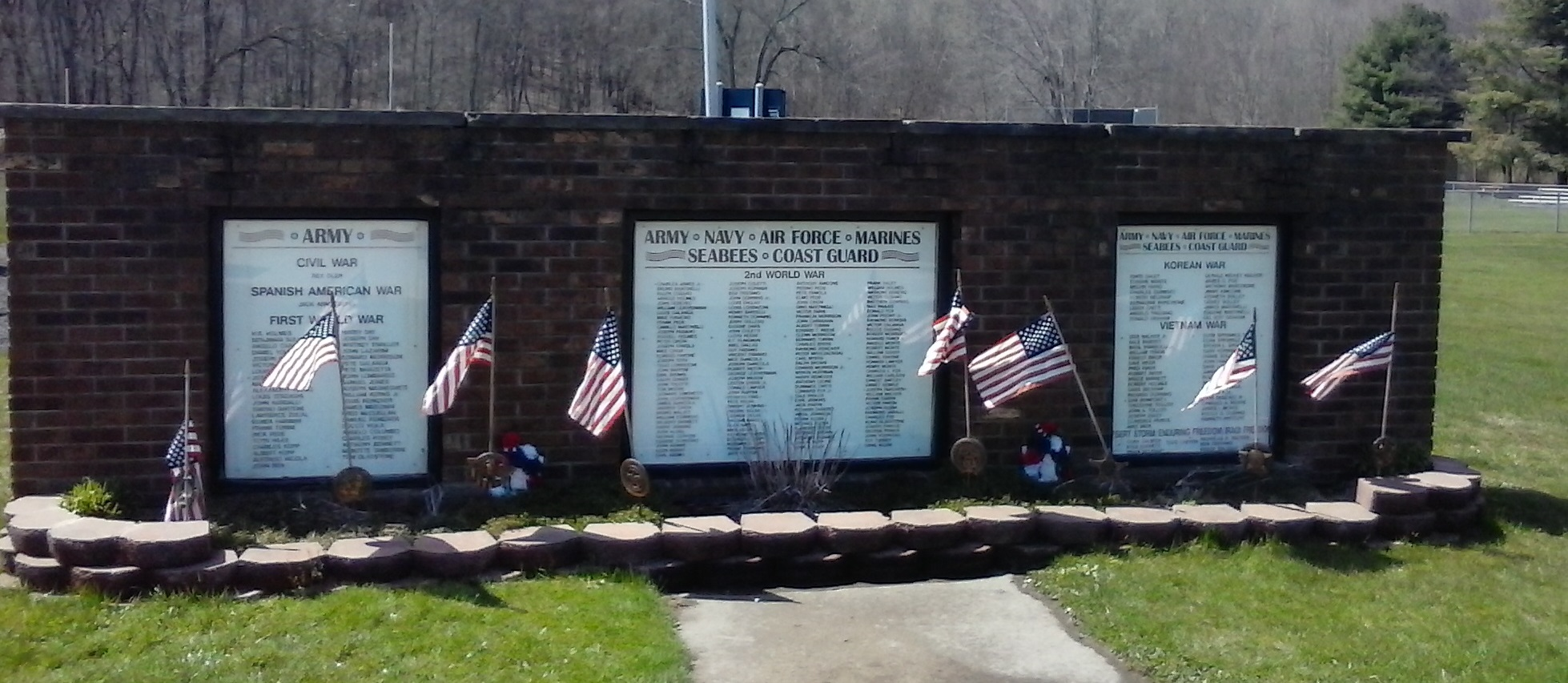
- War veterans are commemorated in this park

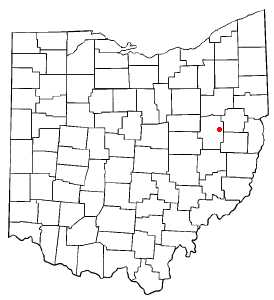
- Location of Roswell, Ohio

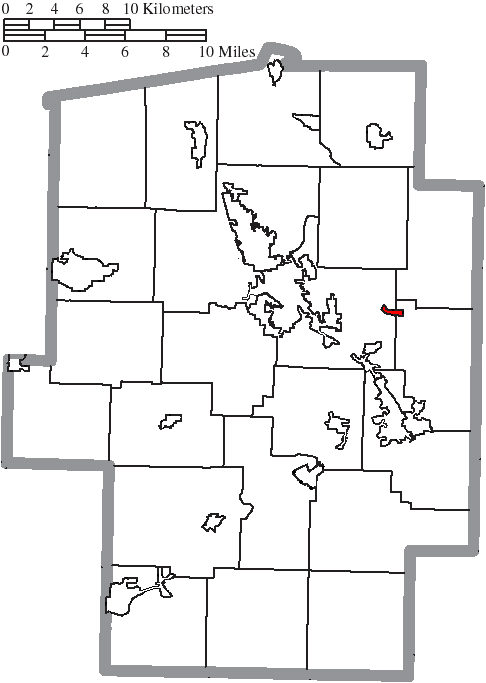
- Location of Roswell in Tuscarawas County
- Coordinates: 40°28′33″N 81°20′53″W
- Country: United States
- State: Ohio
- County: Tuscarawas
- Townships: Goshen, Union

Area
  - Total: 0.28 sq mi (0.72 km^{2})
  - Land: 0.28 sq mi (0.72 km^{2})
  - Water: 0 sq mi (0.00 km^{2})
- Elevation: 1,014 ft (309 m)

Population (2020)
  - Total: 219
  - Density: 784.6/sq mi (302.95/km^{2})
- Time zone: UTC-5 (Eastern (EST))
  - Summer (DST): UTC-4 (EDT)
- FIPS code: 39-68742
- GNIS feature ID: 2399128

Roswell is a village in Tuscarawas County, Ohio, United States. The population was 219 at the 2020 census.

== Geography ==
According to the United States Census Bureau, the village has a total area of 0.26 square miles (0.67 km^{2}), all land.

== Demographics ==
Historical population
Census	Pop.	Note	%±
1910	514		—
1920	420		−18.3%
1930	286		−31.9%
1940	283		−1.0%
1950	267		−5.7%
1960	379		41.9%
1970	317		−16.4%
1980	264		−16.7%
1990	257		−2.7%
2000	276		7.4%
2010	219		−20.7%
2020	219		0.0%
U.S. Decennial Census

=== 2010 census ===
As of the census of 2010, there were 219 people, 85 households, and 59 families living in the village. The population density was 842.3 inhabitants per square mile (325.2/km^{2}). There were 98 housing units at an average density of 376.9 per square mile (145.5/km^{2}). The racial makeup of the village was 98.6% White, 0.5% African American, 0.5% from other races, and 0.5% from two or more races. Hispanic or Latino of any race were 0.5% of the population.

There were 85 households, of which 40.0% had children under the age of 18 living with them, 47.1% were married couples living together, 15.3% had a female householder with no husband present, 7.1% had a male householder with no wife present, and 30.6% were non-families. 25.9% of all households were made up of individuals, and 10.6% had someone living alone who was 65 years of age or older. The average household size was 2.58 and the average family size was 3.02.

The median age in the village was 34.1 years. 28.3% of residents were under the age of 18; 10.8% were between the ages of 18 and 24; 23.7% were from 25 to 44; 27.8% were from 45 to 64; and 9.1% were 65 years of age or older. The gender makeup of the village was 47.5% male and 52.5% female.

=== 2000 census ===
As of the census of 2000, there were 276 people, 91 households, and 72 families living in the village. The population density was 1,014.1 inhabitants per square mile (391.5/km^{2}). There were 98 housing units at an average density of 360.1 per square mile (139.0/km^{2}). The racial makeup of the village was 99.28% White and 0.72% Pacific Islander.

There were 91 households, out of which 48.4% had children under the age of 18 living with them, 65.9% were married couples living together, 5.5% had a female householder with no husband present, and 19.8% were non-families. 15.4% of all households were made up of individuals, and 5.5% had someone living alone who was 65 years of age or older. The average household size was 3.03 and the average family size was 3.33.

In the village, the population was spread out, with 32.2% under the age of 18, 7.6% from 18 to 24, 35.5% from 25 to 44, 17.8% from 45 to 64, and 6.9% who were 65 years of age or older. The median age was 33 years. For every 100 females there were 109.1 males. For every 100 females age 18 and over, there were 101.1 males.

The median income for a household in the village was $27,000, and the median income for a family was $27,500. Males had a median income of $26,500 versus $17,115 for females. The per capita income for the village was $10,627. About 11.8% of families and 21.6% of the population were below the poverty line, including 33.3% of those under the age of eighteen and 7.1% of those 65 or over.
