= Newport, Tuscarawas County, Ohio =

Unincorporated community in Ohio, U.S.

Newport
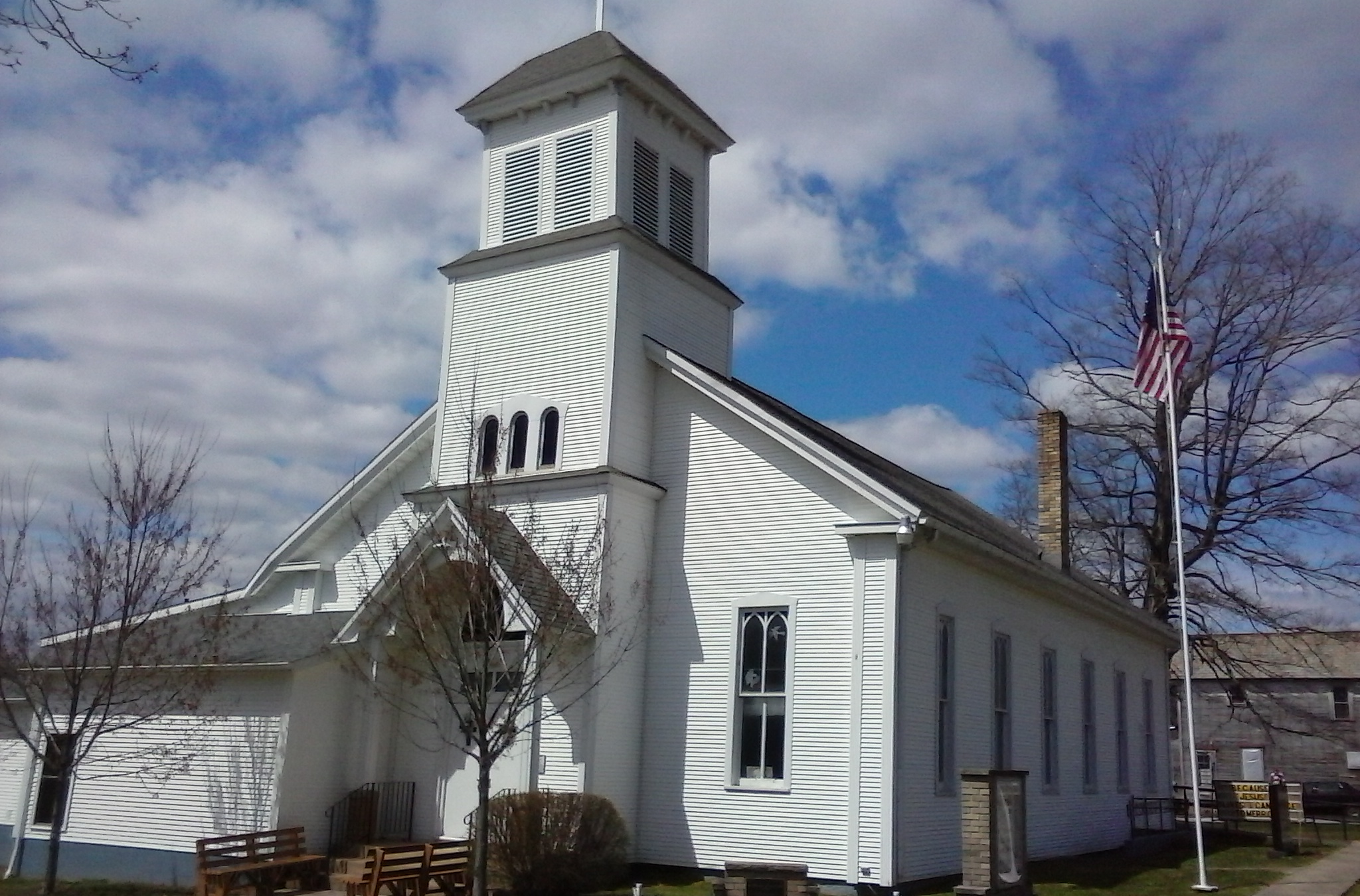
- Methodist Church

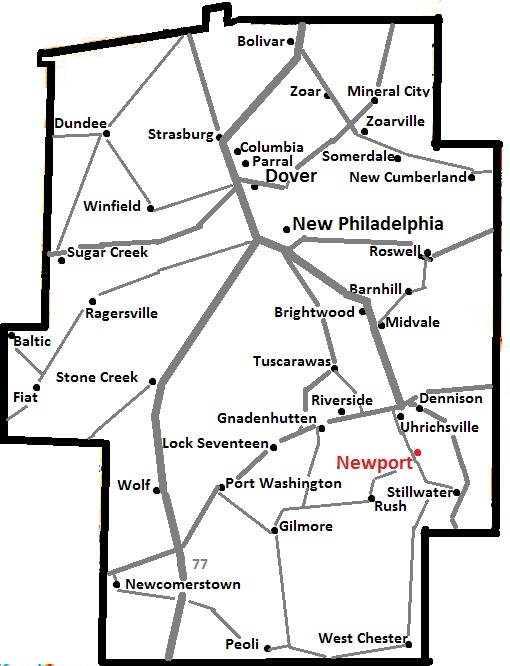
- Location of Barnhill, Ohio

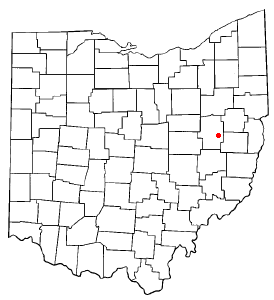
- Location of Newport in Tuscarawas County
- Coordinates: 40°21′33″N 81°20′34″W
- Elevation: 267 m (876 ft)
- GNIS feature ID: 1065148

Newport is a small unincorporated community located in Tuscarawas County.

It is actually 3.1 miles South from the center of Uhrichsville, Ohio. It is in the Eastern Time Zone (UTC-5) observes Daylight Saving Time and is in the Uhrichsville, Ohio ZIP Code of 44683.

Today it is strictly a rural neighborhood with one church, the Newport Methodist Church.

== History ==
Newport was laid out in 1833. The post office at Newport was called Tracy. The Tracy post office was established in 1880, and remained in operation until 1918.
