= Tuscarawas County, Ohio =

County in Ohio, United States

- County
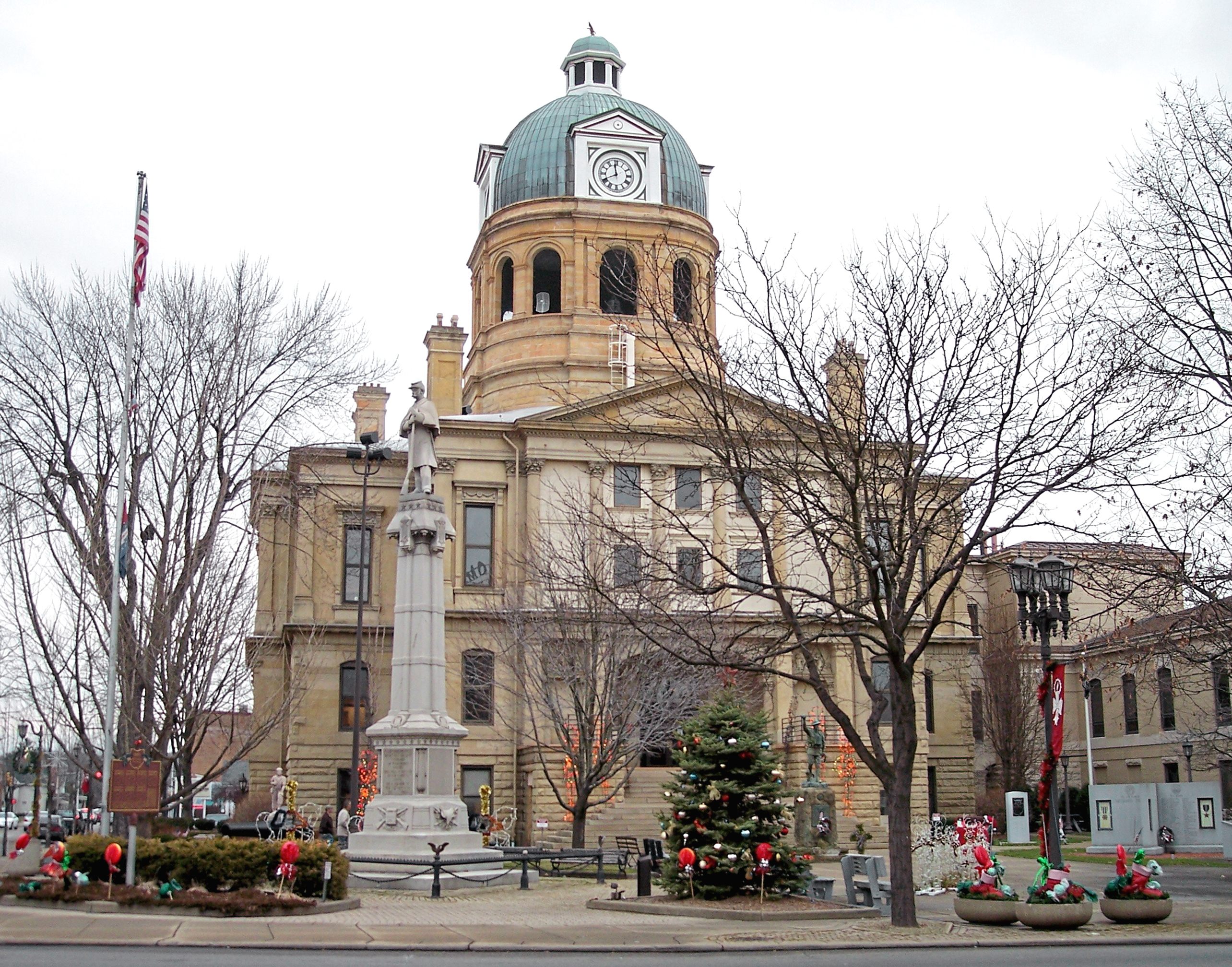
- Tuscarawas County Courthouse

- Flag Seal

- Location within the U.S. state of Ohio
- Coordinates: 40°27′N 81°28′W
- Country: United States
- State: Ohio
- Founded: March 15, 1808
- Named for: Delaware Indian word variously translated as "old town" or "open mouth".
- Seat: New Philadelphia
- Largest city: New Philadelphia

Area
  - Total: 571 sq mi (1,480 km^{2})
  - Land: 568 sq mi (1,470 km^{2})
  - Water: 3.8 sq mi (9.8 km^{2}) 0.7%

Population (2020)
  - Total: 93,263
  - Estimate (2025): 92,373 ▼
  - Density: 163/sq mi (63/km^{2})
- Time zone: UTC−5 (Eastern)
  - Summer (DST): UTC−4 (EDT)
- Congressional districts: 6th, 12th
- Website: www.co.tuscarawas.oh.us

Tuscarawas County (/ˌtʌskəˈrɑːwəs/ TUS-kə-RAH-wəs) is a county located in the northeastern part of the U.S. state of Ohio. As of the 2020 census, the population was 93,263. Its county seat is New Philadelphia. Its name is a Delaware Indian word variously translated as "old town" or "open mouth". Tuscarawas County comprises the New Philadelphia–Dover, OH Micropolitan Statistical Area, which is also included in the Cleveland–Akron–Canton, OH Combined Statistical Area.

== History ==
For years, European-American colonists on the East Coast did not know much about the territory west of the Appalachian Mountains except for reports from a few explorers and fur traders who ventured into the area. In 1750, Christopher Gist of the Ohio Land Company explored the Tuscarawas Valley. His report of the area hinted at some natural riches and friendly American Indians.

In 1761 Moravian missionaries set out from Bethlehem, Pennsylvania, to set up a mission in the Tuscarawas Valley. Christian Frederick Post, David Zeisberger, and John Heckewelder met with Chief Netawatwees of the western Delaware Indians, also known as the Lenape. He invited them to the tribal village he had founded, Gekelemukpechunk (present-day Newcomerstown, Ohio). He granted the missionaries permission to build a cabin near the junction of the Sandy Creek and Tuscarawas River, in present-day Stark County and begin evangelizing the natives. While they were successful in baptizing dozens of converts, they were forced to abandon the mission in 1763 during the French and Indian War (part of the Seven Years' War).

Again, at the request of Chief Netawatwees in 1771, David Zeisberger returned to found additional missions in the Tuscarawas Valley. In the spring of 1772, near the present site of New Philadelphia, Ohio, Zeisberger, along with five converted Indian families established the mission of Schoenbrunn (beautiful spring), also known as Welhik Tuppeek (best spring). They built a school house and a chapel. In August of that year, John Heckawelder brought an additional 250 converted Christian Delawares into the village.

In late summer 1772, they established a second settlement, Gnadenhütten (cabins of grace), located about 10 miles (16 km) from Schoenbrunn. On October 17, 1772, Zeisberger conducted the first religious service at Gnadenhutten. In 1776, Chief Netawatwes donated land for another settlement, Lichtenau (meadow of light), near present-day Coshocton, then the principal Delaware village in the region.

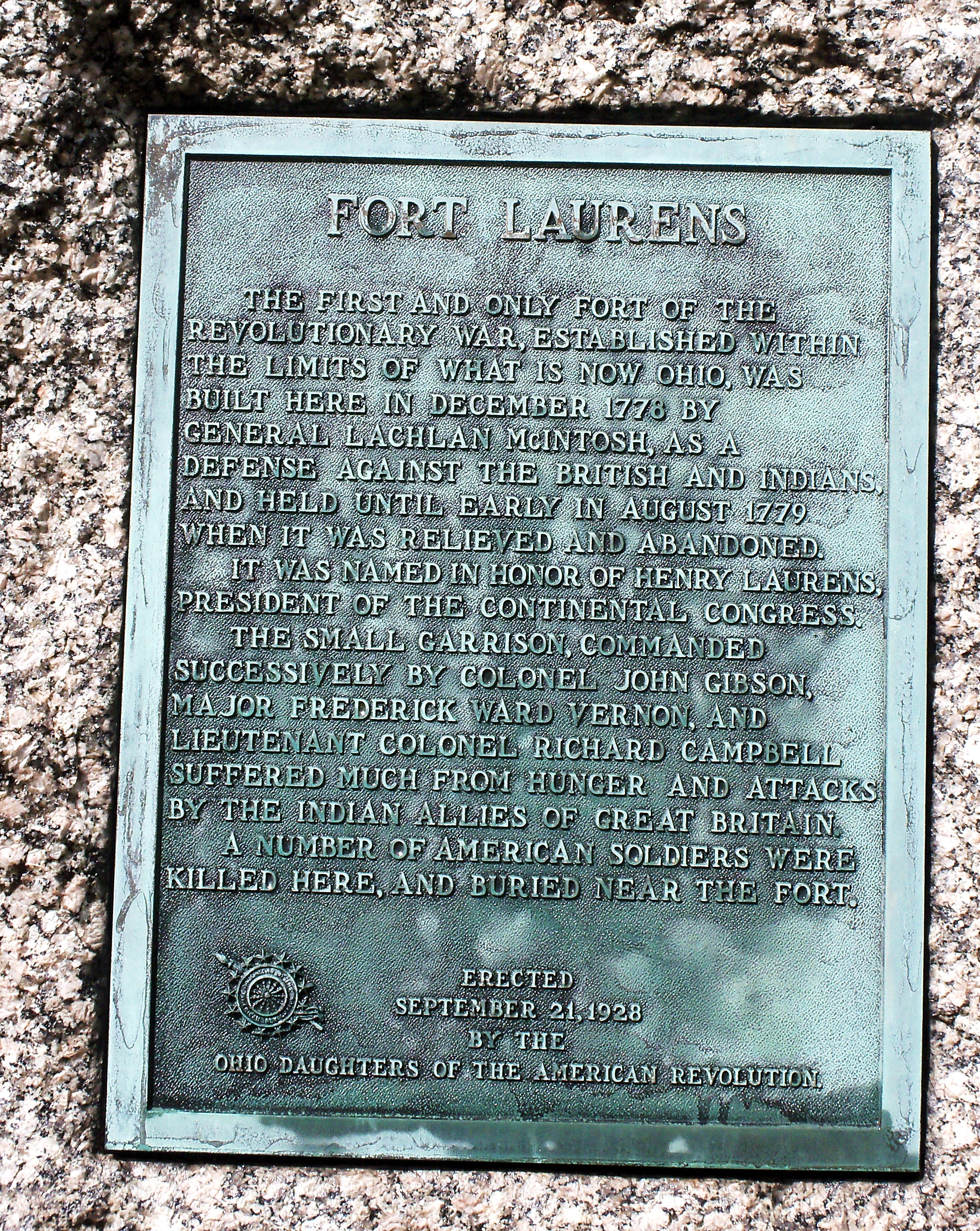
Built in 1778, Fort Laurens was the only military fort built in the state of Ohio during the Revolutionary War, located on the west bank on the Tuscarawas River near the town of Bolivar.

The American Revolutionary War brought the demise of these first settlements. The Delawares, who at the time populated much of eastern Ohio, were divided over their loyalties, with many in the west allied with the British out of Fort Detroit and many in the east allied with the Americans out of Fort Pitt. Delawares were involved in skirmishes against both sides, but by 1781 the American sense was that the Delawares were allying with the British. In response, Colonel Daniel Brodhead of the American forces led an expedition out of Fort Pitt and on April 19, 1781, destroyed the settlement of Coshocton. Surviving residents fled to the north. Colonel Brodhead's forces left the Delawares at the other Moravian mission villages unmolested, but the actions set the stage for raised tensions in the area.

In September 1781, British forces and Indian allies, primarily Wyandot and Delaware, forced the Christian Indians and missionaries from the remaining Moravian villages. The Indian allies took their prisoners further west toward Lake Erie to a new village, called Captive Town, on the Sandusky River. The British took the missionaries David Zeisberger and John Heckewelder under guard back to Fort Detroit, where the two men were tried (but eventually acquitted) on charges of treason against the British Crown.

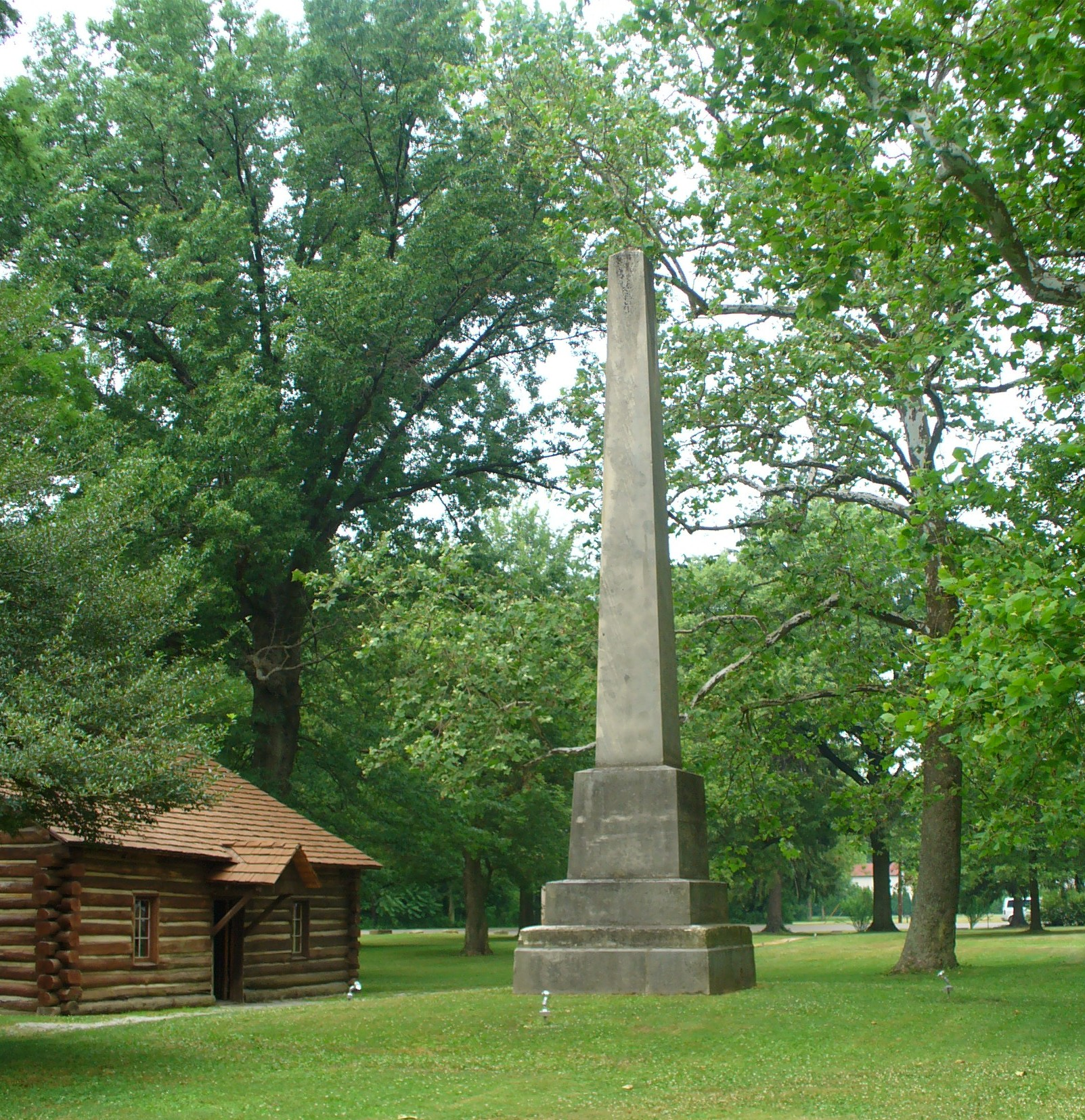
Monument commemorating the Moravian Christian Indian Martyrs who were massacred in 1782 at the mission settlement of Gnadenhutten.

The Indians at Captive Town were going hungry because of insufficient rations, and in February 1782, more than 100 returned to their old Moravian villages to harvest the crops and collect the stored food they had been forced to leave behind. In early March 1782, 160 Pennsylvania militia led by Lieutenant Colonel David Williamson raided the villages and garrisoned the Indians in the village of Gnadenhütten, accusing them of taking part in raids into Pennsylvania. Although the Delawares rejected the charges as they were pacifist Christians, the militia held a council and voted to kill them. The next morning on March 8, the militia tied up the Indians, stunned them with mallet blows to the head, and killed them with fatal scalping cuts. In all, the militia murdered and scalped 28 men, 29 women, and 39 children. They piled the bodies of the Moravian Christian Lenape and Moravian Christian Mahicans in the mission buildings and burned the village down. They also burned the other abandoned Moravian villages in the area.

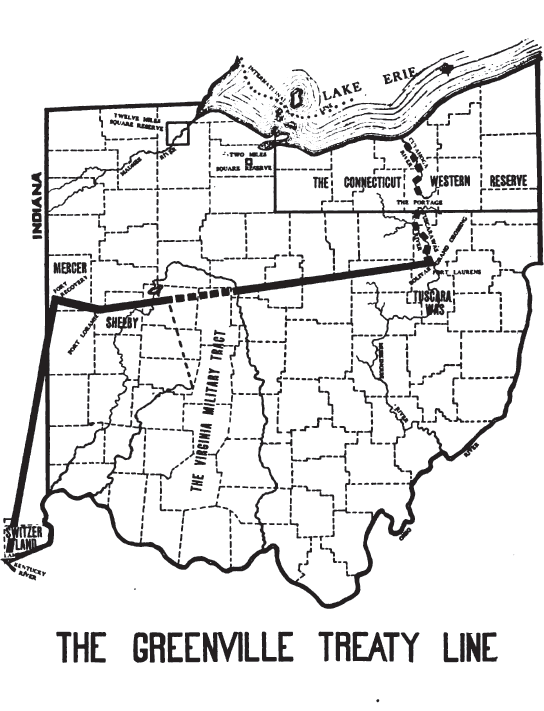
The Treaty of Greenville map of 1795.

This action, which came to be known as the Gnadenhutten massacre, caused an outright frontier war to break out between the Delawares and the Americans. After several years of ongoing campaigns by the natives to terrorize and keep out further American settlers, a brutal campaign by US General "Mad Anthony" Wayne from Fort Washington (now Cincinnati) was carried out in late 1793, eventually resulting in the Treaty of Greenville being signed in 1795 between the US government and the local natives. The Treaty ceded the eastern two-thirds of current-day Ohio to white settlers and once again opened up the territory for white settlement.

In October 1798, David Zeisberger, the same Moravian missionary who had founded many of the original missions in the 1770s, returned to the Tuscarawas Valley to found a new mission, Goshen, from where he continued his work to evangelize the local natives with the Christian gospel. Over the next several years, farmer settlers from Pennsylvania came trickling into the area, and by 1808, the first permanent settlement, New Philadelphia, was founded near the Goshen mission. After the War of 1812, Goshen declined as a mission until it was disbanded in 1824.

Tuscarawas County was formed from Muskingum County on February 15, 1808.

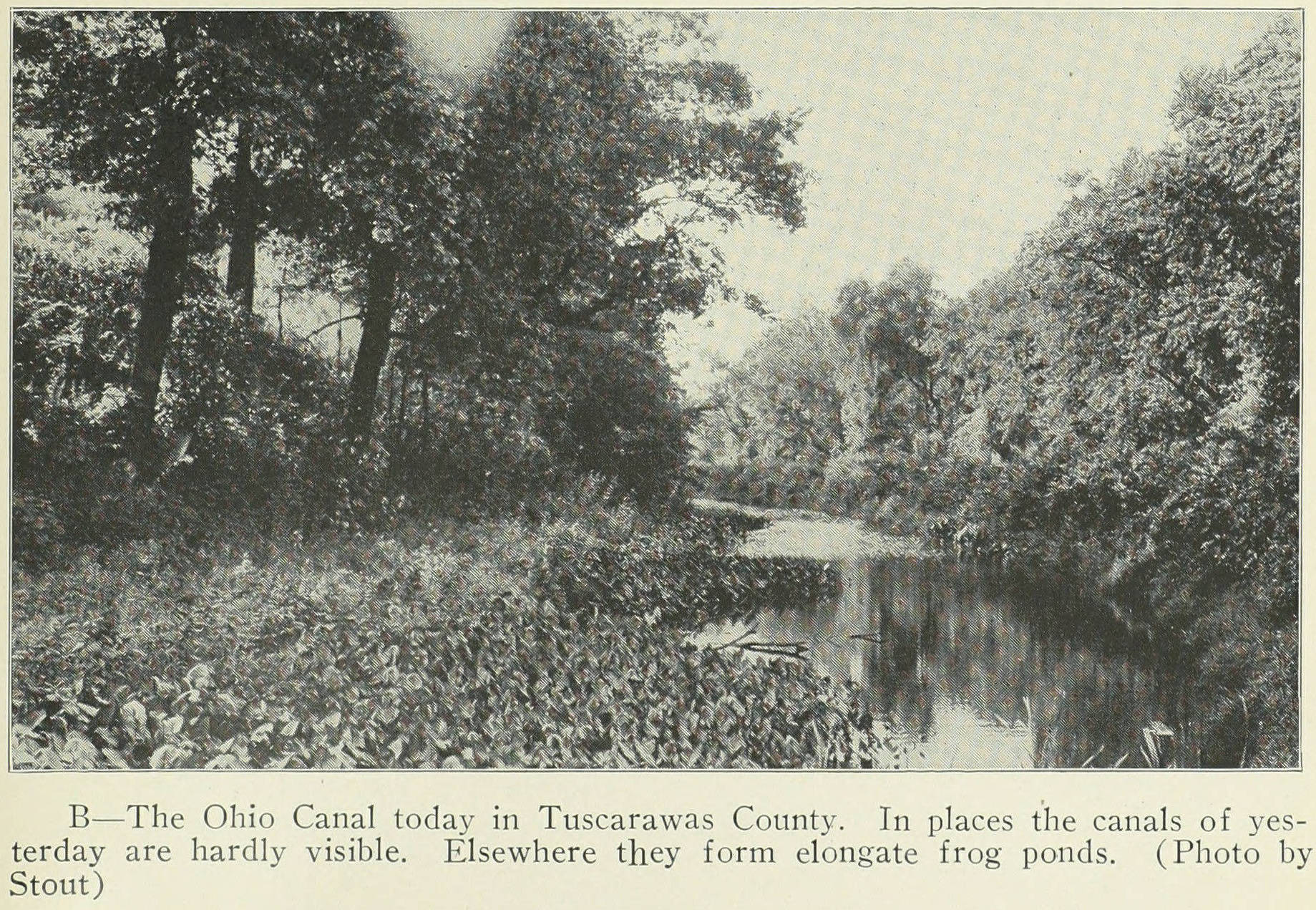
Ohio and Erie Canal seen in Tuscarawas County from Geography of Ohio, 1923

In the late 1820s, Tuscarawas County was chosen to be on the route of the Ohio and Erie Canal, a man-made waterway linking Lake Erie (via Cleveland) to the Ohio River (via Portsmouth, Ohio). Construction from Massillon, Ohio to Canal Dover, Ohio was completed in 1829. Construction from Canal Dover, Ohio to Newark, Ohio was completed in 1830. A total of 15 locks were built in Tuscarawas County, entering the county line on an aqueduct north of Zoar, Ohio on Lock 7 to Newcomerstown, Ohio, exiting the county below Lock 21. In 1848, the feeder Sandy and Beaver Canal was completed, linking Bolivar, Ohio to the Ohio River at Glasgow, Pennsylvania. With the rise of railroads, and a massive flood in 1913, the canal system was abandoned. Three years later, the city of Canal Dover shortened its name Dover to 1916.

== Geography ==
According to the U.S. Census Bureau, the county has a total area of 571 square miles (1,480 km^{2}), of which 568 square miles (1,470 km^{2}) is land and 3.8 square miles (9.8 km^{2}) (0.71%) is water.

=== Adjacent counties ===
- Stark County (north)
- Carroll County (northeast)
- Harrison County (southeast)
- Guernsey County (south)
- Coshocton County (southwest)
- Holmes County (northwest)

== Demographics ==
Historical population
| Census | Pop. | Note | %± |
|---|---|---|---|
| 1810 | 3,045 | | — |
| 1820 | 8,328 | | 173.5% |
| 1830 | 14,298 | | 71.7% |
| 1840 | 25,631 | | 79.3% |
| 1850 | 31,761 | | 23.9% |
| 1860 | 32,463 | | 2.2% |
| 1870 | 33,840 | | 4.2% |
| 1880 | 40,198 | | 18.8% |
| 1890 | 46,618 | | 16.0% |
| 1900 | 53,751 | | 15.3% |
| 1910 | 57,035 | | 6.1% |
| 1920 | 63,578 | | 11.5% |
| 1930 | 68,193 | | 7.3% |
| 1940 | 68,816 | | 0.9% |
| 1950 | 70,320 | | 2.2% |
| 1960 | 76,789 | | 9.2% |
| 1970 | 77,211 | | 0.5% |
| 1980 | 84,614 | | 9.6% |
| 1990 | 84,090 | | −0.6% |
| 2000 | 90,852 | | 8.0% |
| 2010 | 92,582 | | 1.9% |
| 2020 | 93,263 | | 0.7% |
| 2025 (est.) | 92,373 | ▼ | −1.0% |
U.S. Decennial Census; 1790-1960 1900-90; 1990-2000 2020 2025

Age pyramid of Tuscarawas County, based on 2000 census information.

=== Racial and ethnic composition ===
Tuscarawas County, Ohio – Racial and ethnic composition Note: the US Census treats Hispanic/Latino as an ethnic category. This table excludes Latinos from the racial categories and assigns them to a separate category. Hispanics/Latinos may be of any race.
| Race / Ethnicity (NH = Non-Hispanic) | Pop. 1980 | Pop. 1990 | Pop. 2000 | Pop. 2010 | Pop. 2020 | % 1980 | % 1990 | % 2000 | % 2010 | % 2020 |
|---|---|---|---|---|---|---|---|---|---|---|
| White alone (NH) | 83,413 | 82,911 | 88,576 | 88,614 | 84,979 | 98.58% | 98.60% | 97.43% | 95.71% | 91.12% |
| Black or African American alone (NH) | 647 | 623 | 655 | 696 | 697 | 0.76% | 0.74% | 0.72% | 0.75% | 0.75% |
| Native American or Alaska Native alone (NH) | 83 | 136 | 145 | 133 | 117 | 0.10% | 0.16% | 0.16% | 0.14% | 0.13% |
| Asian alone (NH) | 175 | 184 | 220 | 286 | 306 | 0.21% | 0.22% | 0.24% | 0.31% | 0.33% |
| Native Hawaiian or Pacific Islander alone (NH) | x | x | 39 | 72 | 29 | x | x | 0.04% | 0.08% | 0.03% |
| Other race alone (NH) | 44 | 8 | 39 | 40 | 169 | 0.05% | 0.01% | 0.04% | 0.04% | 0.18% |
| Mixed race or Multiracial (NH) | x | x | 528 | 974 | 3,004 | x | x | 0.58% | 1.05% | 3.22% |
| Hispanic or Latino (any race) | 252 | 228 | 650 | 1,767 | 3,962 | 0.30% | 0.27% | 0.71% | 1.91% | 4.25% |
| Total | 84,614 | 84,090 | 90,852 | 92,582 | 93,263 | 100.00% | 100.00% | 100.00% | 100.00% | 100.00% |

=== 2020 census ===
As of the 2020 census, the county had a population of 93,263. The median age was 41.6 years; 22.7% of residents were under the age of 18 and 20.1% were 65 years of age or older. For every 100 females there were 97.9 males, and for every 100 females age 18 and over there were 96.4 males age 18 and over.

The racial makeup of the county was 91.9% White, 0.8% Black or African American, 1.0% American Indian and Alaska Native, 0.3% Asian, <0.1% Native Hawaiian and Pacific Islander, 1.9% from some other race, and 4.1% from two or more races. Hispanic or Latino residents of any race comprised 4.2% of the population.

50.2% of residents lived in urban areas, while 49.8% lived in rural areas.

There were 37,711 households in the county, of which 28.4% had children under the age of 18 living in them. Of all households, 50.8% were married-couple households, 17.8% were households with a male householder and no spouse or partner present, and 24.0% were households with a female householder and no spouse or partner present. About 28.0% of all households were made up of individuals and 13.7% had someone living alone who was 65 years of age or older.

There were 40,817 housing units, of which 7.6% were vacant. Among occupied housing units, 70.3% were owner-occupied and 29.7% were renter-occupied. The homeowner vacancy rate was 1.3% and the rental vacancy rate was 8.0%.

=== 2010 census ===
As of the 2010 United States census, there were 92,582 people, 36,965 households, and 25,318 families residing in the county. The population density was 163.1 inhabitants per square mile (63.0/km^{2}). There were 40,206 housing units at an average density of 70.8 units per square mile (27.3 units/km^{2}). The racial makeup of the county was 96.6% white, 0.8% black or African American, 0.3% Asian, 0.3% American Indian, 0.2% Pacific islander, 0.7% from other races, and 1.2% from two or more races. Those of Hispanic or Latino origin made up 1.9% of the population. In terms of ancestry, 38.0% were German, 16.0% were Irish, 10.9% were English, 7.7% were American, and 7.6% were Italian. 94.7% spoke English, 1.4% Spanish, 1.1% German, and 2.0% another West Germanic language.

Of the 36,965 households, 30.6% had children under the age of 18 living with them, 54.0% were married couples living together, 9.8% had a female householder with no husband present, 31.5% were non-families, and 26.6% of all households were made up of individuals. The average household size was 2.47 and the average family size was 2.97. The median age was 40.9 years.

The median income for a household in the county was $42,081 and the median income for a family was $51,330. Males had a median income of $40,490 versus $27,193 for females. The per capita income for the county was $20,536. About 9.2% of families and 12.8% of the population were below the poverty line, including 17.7% of those under age 18 and 10.2% of those age 65 or over.

=== 2000 census ===
As of the census of 2000, there were 90,914 people, 35,653 households, and 25,313 families residing in the county. The population density was 160 inhabitants per square mile (62/km^{2}). There were 38,113 housing units at an average density of 67 units per square mile (26/km^{2}). The racial makeup of the county was 97.87% White, 0.73% Black or African American, 0.17% Native American, 0.24% Asian, 0.05% Pacific Islander, 0.21% from other races, and 0.73% from two or more races. Hispanic or Latino of any race were 0.71% of the population. 95.3% spoke English, 1.3% German and 1.1% Spanish as their first language.

There were 35,653 households, out of which 32.30% had children under the age of 18 living with them, 58.10% were married couples living together, 9.30% had a female householder with no husband present, and 29.00% were non-families. 24.90% of all households were made up of individuals, and 11.50% had someone living alone who was 65 years of age or older. The average household size was 2.52 and the average family size was 3.01.

In the county, the age distribution of the population shows 25.40% under the age of 18, 8.00% from 18 to 24, 28.10% from 25 to 44, 23.60% from 45 to 64, and 15.00% who were 65 years of age or older. The median age was 38 years. For every 100 females there were 95.10 males. For every 100 females age 18 and over, there were 91.40 males.

The median income for a household in the county was $35,489, and the median income for a family was $41,677. Males had a median income of $31,963 versus $20,549 for females. The per capita income for the county was $17,276. About 7.20% of families and 9.40% of the population were below the poverty line, including 12.20% of those under age 18 and 7.80% of those age 65 or over.

=== Amish and Mennonite communities ===
In 2020, the Amish and Mennonite population was 3,496 or 3.7% of the total population

== Politics ==
Prior to 1912, Tuscarawas County was a Democratic Party stronghold in presidential elections. But starting with the 1916 election, the county had become a bellwether county until 2012, only backing losing candidates in 1960 and 1968. Starting with the 2012 election, the county began to swing markedly to the right, and is now solidly Republican.

United States presidential election results for Tuscarawas County, Ohio
| Year | Republican | | Democratic | | Third party(ies) | |
| Year | No. | % | No. | % | No. | % |
|---|---|---|---|---|---|---|
| 1856 | 3,007 | 52.93% | 2,656 | 46.75% | 18 | 0.32% |
| 1860 | 3,136 | 51.72% | 2,846 | 46.93% | 82 | 1.35% |
| 1864 | 3,049 | 49.47% | 3,114 | 50.53% | 0 | 0.00% |
| 1868 | 3,145 | 47.82% | 3,432 | 52.18% | 0 | 0.00% |
| 1872 | 3,178 | 46.96% | 3,586 | 52.99% | 3 | 0.04% |
| 1876 | 3,574 | 43.95% | 4,545 | 55.89% | 13 | 0.16% |
| 1880 | 4,096 | 45.33% | 4,844 | 53.61% | 96 | 1.06% |
| 1884 | 4,394 | 44.96% | 5,215 | 53.36% | 165 | 1.69% |
| 1888 | 4,730 | 45.23% | 5,484 | 52.44% | 243 | 2.32% |
| 1892 | 4,746 | 42.97% | 5,715 | 51.74% | 584 | 5.29% |
| 1896 | 6,235 | 47.15% | 6,898 | 52.16% | 92 | 0.70% |
| 1900 | 6,355 | 47.19% | 6,867 | 50.99% | 245 | 1.82% |
| 1904 | 7,203 | 55.76% | 4,979 | 38.55% | 735 | 5.69% |
| 1908 | 6,717 | 47.29% | 6,775 | 47.69% | 713 | 5.02% |
| 1912 | 3,417 | 27.34% | 4,978 | 39.84% | 4,101 | 32.82% |
| 1916 | 5,404 | 38.96% | 7,608 | 54.84% | 860 | 6.20% |
| 1920 | 11,908 | 51.96% | 10,167 | 44.36% | 844 | 3.68% |
| 1924 | 13,573 | 56.97% | 5,566 | 23.36% | 4,686 | 19.67% |
| 1928 | 20,494 | 74.34% | 6,805 | 24.68% | 269 | 0.98% |
| 1932 | 12,369 | 41.36% | 16,648 | 55.67% | 888 | 2.97% |
| 1936 | 10,317 | 31.30% | 21,991 | 66.71% | 657 | 1.99% |
| 1940 | 14,675 | 43.57% | 19,004 | 56.43% | 0 | 0.00% |
| 1944 | 14,357 | 47.01% | 16,184 | 52.99% | 0 | 0.00% |
| 1948 | 11,873 | 44.27% | 14,799 | 55.19% | 145 | 0.54% |
| 1952 | 18,620 | 53.27% | 16,332 | 46.73% | 0 | 0.00% |
| 1956 | 19,876 | 60.63% | 12,908 | 39.37% | 0 | 0.00% |
| 1960 | 20,637 | 56.20% | 16,083 | 43.80% | 0 | 0.00% |
| 1964 | 9,962 | 29.66% | 23,623 | 70.34% | 0 | 0.00% |
| 1968 | 14,102 | 43.44% | 15,617 | 48.11% | 2,742 | 8.45% |
| 1972 | 18,413 | 59.07% | 12,255 | 39.32% | 501 | 1.61% |
| 1976 | 14,279 | 44.84% | 16,880 | 53.01% | 682 | 2.14% |
| 1980 | 15,708 | 52.21% | 12,117 | 40.27% | 2,261 | 7.52% |
| 1984 | 19,366 | 59.13% | 13,149 | 40.14% | 239 | 0.73% |
| 1988 | 17,145 | 54.28% | 14,185 | 44.90% | 259 | 0.82% |
| 1992 | 13,179 | 35.72% | 14,787 | 40.08% | 8,928 | 24.20% |
| 1996 | 13,388 | 38.52% | 15,244 | 43.86% | 6,123 | 17.62% |
| 2000 | 19,549 | 52.67% | 15,879 | 42.78% | 1,690 | 4.55% |
| 2004 | 23,829 | 55.54% | 18,853 | 43.94% | 224 | 0.52% |
| 2008 | 20,454 | 47.50% | 21,498 | 49.93% | 1,105 | 2.57% |
| 2012 | 22,242 | 53.35% | 18,407 | 44.15% | 1,044 | 2.50% |
| 2016 | 26,918 | 64.70% | 12,188 | 29.29% | 2,500 | 6.01% |
| 2020 | 30,458 | 69.09% | 12,889 | 29.24% | 740 | 1.68% |
| 2024 | 30,652 | 70.94% | 12,032 | 27.84% | 527 | 1.22% |

United States Senate election results for Tuscarawas County, Ohio1
| Year | Republican | | Democratic | | Third party(ies) | |
| Year | No. | % | No. | % | No. | % |
|---|---|---|---|---|---|---|
| 2024 | 27,395 | 64.25% | 13,501 | 31.67% | 1,740 | 4.08% |

== Communities ==
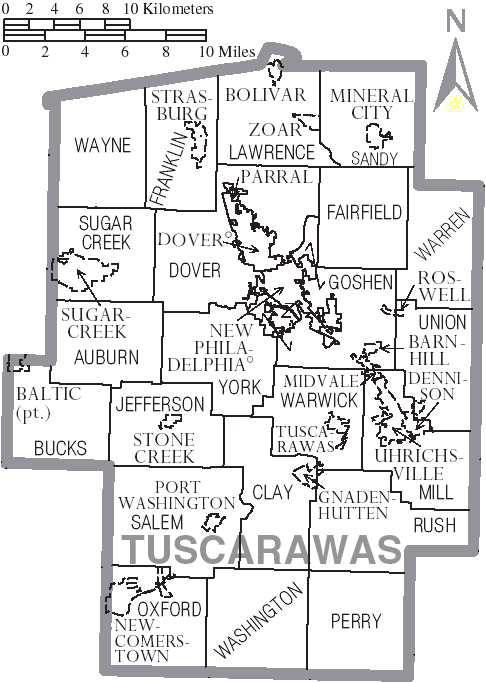
Map of Tuscarawas County, Ohio with municipal and township labels

=== Cities ===
- Dover
- New Philadelphia (county seat)
- Uhrichsville

=== Villages ===
- Baltic
- Barnhill
- Bolivar
- Dennison
- Gnadenhutten
- Midvale
- Mineral City
- Newcomerstown
- Parral
- Port Washington
- Roswell
- Stone Creek
- Strasburg
- Sugarcreek
- Tuscarawas
- Zoar

=== Townships ===
- Auburn
- Bucks
- Clay
- Dover
- Fairfield
- Franklin
- Goshen
- Jefferson
- Lawrence
- Mill
- Oxford
- Perry
- Rush
- Salem
- Sandy
- Sugar Creek
- Union
- Warren
- Warwick
- Washington
- Wayne
- York

=== Census-designated places ===
- Dundee
- Sandyville
- Wilkshire Hills

=== Unincorporated communities ===
- Barrs Mills
- Bernice
- Blackband
- Columbia
- Eastport
- Gilmore
- Glasgow
- Goshen
- Hartwood
- Lock Seventeen
- Mount Tabor
- New Cumberland
- Newport
- Peoli
- Postboy
- Ragersville
- Rockford
- Schoenbrunn
- Somerdale
- Stillwater
- Wainwright
- West Chester
- Winfield
- Wolf
- Yorktown
- Zoarville

== Notable people ==
- Samuel G. Cosgrove, sixth governor of the state of Washington
- William Clarke Quantrill, Confederate guerrilla leader during the American Civil War.
- Cy Young, Major League Baseball Hall of Famer
- Woody Hayes, Ohio State football coach

== See also ==
- National Register of Historic Places listings in Tuscarawas County, Ohio
