= Postboy, Ohio =

Unincorporated community in Ohio, U.S.

Coordinates: 40°13′37″N 81°35′03″W

Postboy is an unincorporated community in Tuscarawas County, in the U.S. state of Ohio.

== History ==
A post office called Post Boy was established in 1879, the name was changed to Postboy in 1893, and the post office closed in 1926. The community takes its name from nearby Postboy Creek.
