= Blackband, Ohio =

Unincorporated community in Ohio, U.S.

Coordinates: 40°25′33″N 81°32′31″W

Blackband is an unincorporated community in Tuscarawas County, in the U.S. state of Ohio.

== History ==
Blackband had its start when the railroad was extended to that point. A post office called Blackband was established in 1873.
