= Tuscarawas, Ohio =

- Village
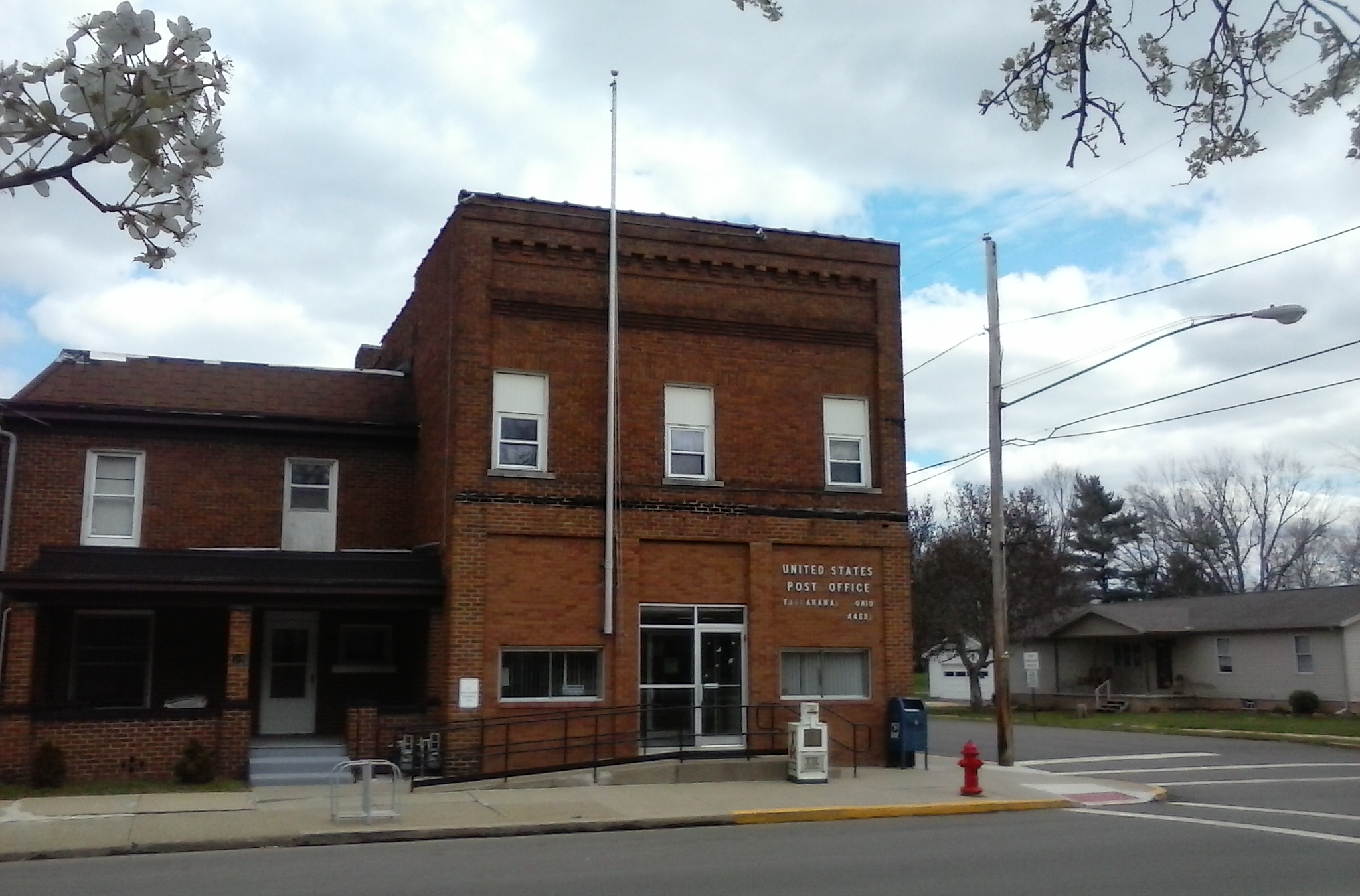
- Post Office

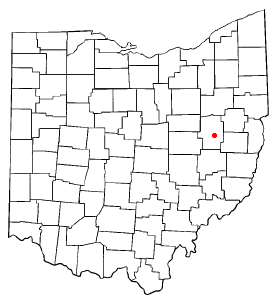
- Location of Tuscarawas, Ohio

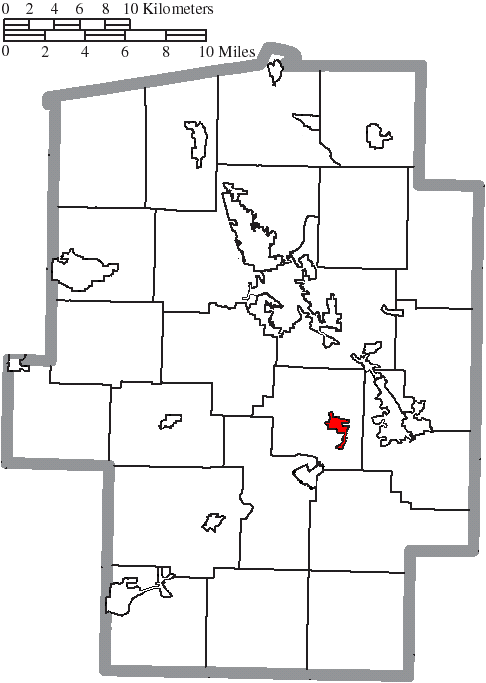
- Location of Tuscarawas in Tuscarawas County
- Coordinates: 40°23′36″N 81°24′02″W
- Country: United States
- State: Ohio
- County: Tuscarawas
- Township: Warwick

Area
  - Total: 0.75 sq mi (1.94 km^{2})
  - Land: 0.73 sq mi (1.90 km^{2})
  - Water: 0.015 sq mi (0.04 km^{2})
- Elevation: 840 ft (260 m)

Population (2020)
  - Total: 1,035
  - Density: 1,411.1/sq mi (544.82/km^{2})
- Time zone: UTC-5 (Eastern (EST))
  - Summer (DST): UTC-4 (EDT)
- ZIP code: 44682
- Area code: 740
- FIPS code: 39-77924
- GNIS feature ID: 2400010
- Website: https://www.tuscvg.org/

Tuscarawas (/ˌtʌskəˈrɑːwəs/ TUS-kə-RAH-wəs), originally Trenton, is a village in Tuscarawas County, Ohio, United States. The population was 1,035 at the 2020 census.

== History ==
According to Chester Hale Sipe (1880), the town was founded in 1756 by Tamaqua, also known as King Beaver. Sipe says: "As early as 1756, [Tamaqua] established the town of Tuscarawas, on the river of the same name in Ohio, a town which was later known as King Beaver's Town. There he died in 1771."

A post office called Tuscarawas has been in operation since 1828. The village derives its name from the Tuscarora Indians.

== Geography ==
Tuscarawas is located along the Tuscarawas River.

According to the United States Census Bureau, the village has a total area of 0.74 square miles (1.92 km^{2}), of which 0.71 square miles (1.84 km^{2}) is land and 0.03 square miles (0.08 km^{2}) is water.

== Demographics ==
Historical population
Census	Pop.	Note	%±
1890	391		—
1900	412		5.4%
1910	471		14.3%
1920	499		5.9%
1930	631		26.5%
1940	663		5.1%
1950	700		5.6%
1960	817		16.7%
1970	830		1.6%
1980	917		10.5%
1990	826		−9.9%
2000	934		13.1%
2010	1,056		13.1%
2020	1,035		−2.0%
U.S. Decennial Census

=== 2010 census ===
As of the census of 2010, there were 1,056 people, 439 households, and 274 families living in the village. The population density was 1,487.3 inhabitants per square mile (574.2/km^{2}). There were 475 housing units at an average density of 669.0 per square mile (258.3/km^{2}). The racial makeup of the village was 99.0% White, 0.1% African American, 0.5% Asian, and 0.5% from two or more races. Hispanic or Latino of any race were 0.4% of the population.

There were 439 households, of which 29.2% had children under the age of 18 living with them, 52.4% were married couples living together, 5.2% had a female householder with no husband present, 4.8% had a male householder with no wife present, and 37.6% were non-families. 32.3% of all households were made up of individuals, and 19.1% had someone living alone who was 65 years of age or older. The average household size was 2.41 and the average family size was 3.08.

The median age in the village was 39.9 years. 24.1% of residents were under the age of 18; 6.9% were between the ages of 18 and 24; 24.1% were from 25 to 44; 28% were from 45 to 64; and 17% were 65 years of age or older. The gender makeup of the village was 49.8% male and 50.2% female.

=== 2000 census ===
As of the census of 2000, there were 934 people, 373 households, and 271 families living in the village. The population density was 1,318.1 inhabitants per square mile (508.9/km^{2}). There were 396 housing units at an average density of 558.9 per square mile (215.8/km^{2}). The racial makeup of the village was 98.82% White, 0.21% Asian, and 0.96% from two or more races. Hispanic or Latino of any race were 0.11% of the population.

There were 373 households, out of which 32.7% had children under the age of 18 living with them, 58.4% were married couples living together, 9.7% had a female householder with no husband present, and 27.3% were non-families. 24.7% of all households were made up of individuals, and 13.9% had someone living alone who was 65 years of age or older. The average household size was 2.50 and the average family size was 2.95.

In the village, the population was spread out, with 25.1% under the age of 18, 6.7% from 18 to 24, 28.2% from 25 to 44, 22.1% from 45 to 64, and 18.0% who were 65 years of age or older. The median age was 39 years. For every 100 females there were 92.2 males. For every 100 females age 18 and over, there were 91.8 males.

The median income for a household in the village was $35,592, and the median income for a family was $43,646. Males had a median income of $30,288 versus $20,357 for females. The per capita income for the village was $15,806. About 4.5% of families and 7.4% of the population were below the poverty line, including 7.0% of those under age 18 and 9.8% of those age 65 or over.

== Education ==
Indian Valley Middle School is located in Tuscarawas. Tuscarawas is served by a branch of the Tuscarawas County Public Library.
