= Wainwright, Tuscarawas County, Ohio =

Unincorporated community in Ohio, U.S.

Coordinates: 40°24′55″N 81°25′31″W

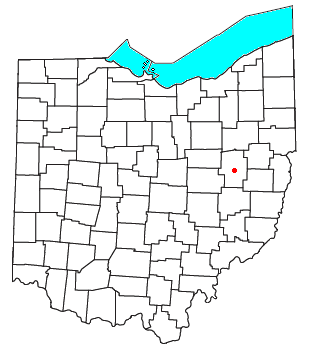
Location of Wainwright in Tuscarawas County, Ohio

Wainwright is an unincorporated community in northern Warwick Township, Tuscarawas County, Ohio, United States. It lies along Wainwright Road, between Tuscarawas and New Philadelphia.

== History ==
A post office called Wainwright has been in operation since 1895. Wainwright originally was a mining community and the Wainwright Coal Company operated there.
