= Parral, Ohio =

- Village
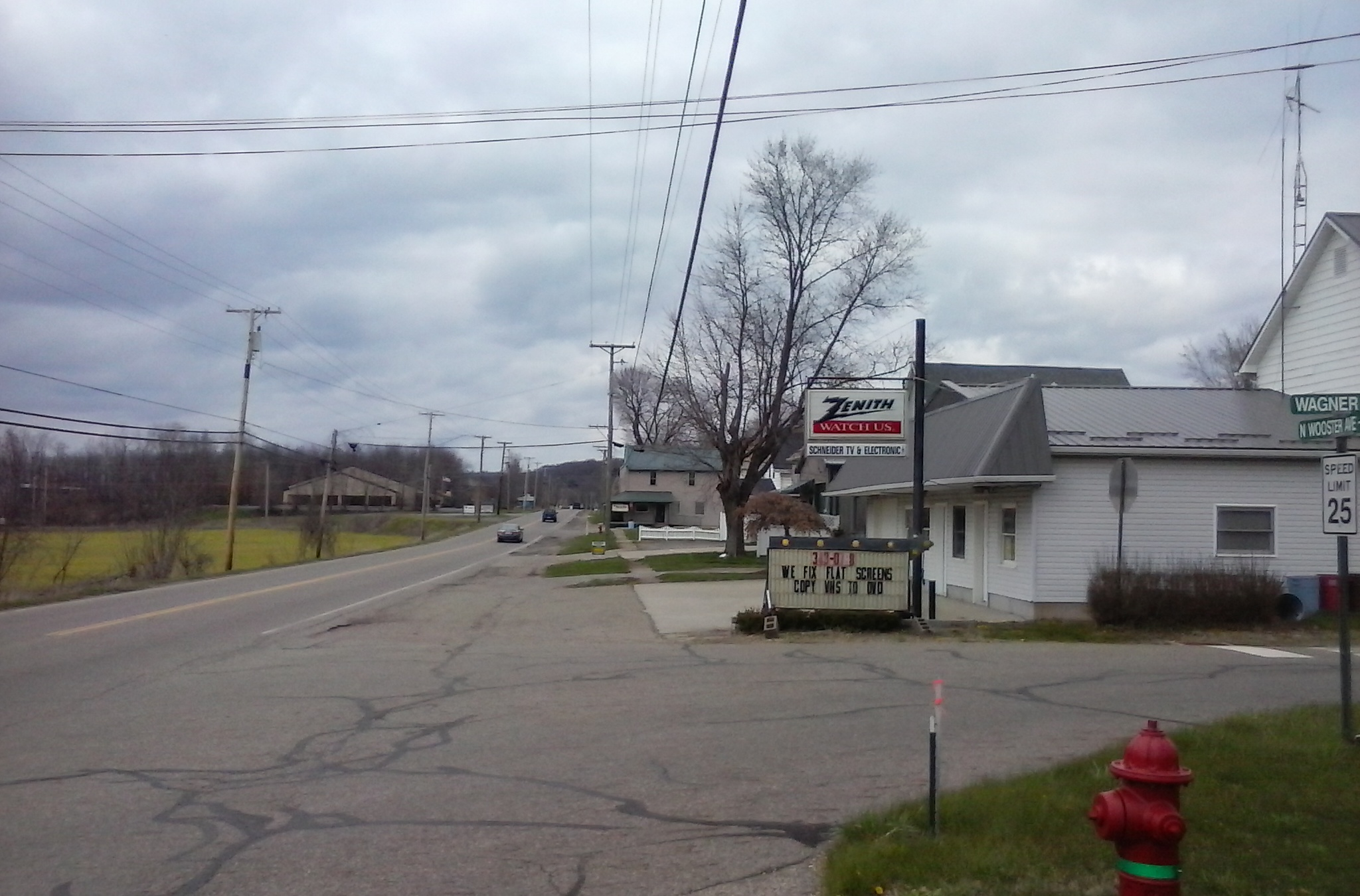
- Wooster Avenue

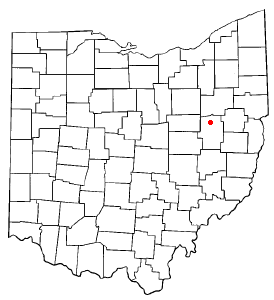
- Location of Parral, Ohio

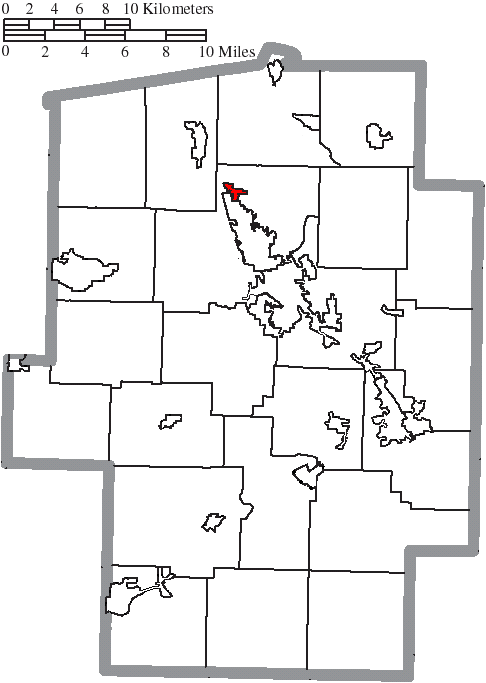
- Location of Parral in Tuscarawas County
- Coordinates: 40°33′39″N 81°29′42″W
- Country: United States
- State: Ohio
- County: Tuscarawas
- Township: Dover

Area
  - Total: 0.18 sq mi (0.47 km^{2})
  - Land: 0.18 sq mi (0.47 km^{2})
  - Water: 0 sq mi (0.00 km^{2})
- Elevation: 922 ft (281 m)

Population (2020)
  - Total: 205
  - Density: 1,141.3/sq mi (440.67/km^{2})
- Time zone: UTC-5 (Eastern (EST))
  - Summer (DST): UTC-4 (EDT)
- ZIP code: 44622
- Area code: 330
- FIPS code: 39-61056
- GNIS feature ID: 2399627

Parral is a village in Tuscarawas County, Ohio, United States. The population was 205 at the 2020 census.

== History ==
Parral was laid out in 1900, and named after Parral, Mexico. A post office called Parral was established in 1902, and remained in operation until 1915.

== Geography ==
According to the United States Census Bureau, the village has a total area of 0.18 square miles (0.47 km^{2}), all land.

== Demographics ==
Historical population
Census	Pop.	Note	%±
1930	205		—
1940	205		0.0%
1950	199		−2.9%
1960	268		34.7%
1970	271		1.1%
1980	259		−4.4%
1990	255		−1.5%
2000	241		−5.5%
2010	218		−9.5%
2020	205		−6.0%
U.S. Decennial Census

=== 2010 census ===
As of the census of 2010, there were 218 people, 100 households, and 65 families living in the village. The population density was 1,211.1 inhabitants per square mile (467.6/km^{2}). There were 106 housing units at an average density of 588.9 per square mile (227.4/km^{2}). The racial makeup of the village was 95.0% White, 0.5% African American, 1.8% from other races, and 2.8% from two or more races. Hispanic or Latino of any race were 2.3% of the population.

There were 100 households, of which 22.0% had children under the age of 18 living with them, 51.0% were married couples living together, 8.0% had a female householder with no husband present, 6.0% had a male householder with no wife present, and 35.0% were non-families. 32.0% of all households were made up of individuals, and 14% had someone living alone who was 65 years of age or older. The average household size was 2.18 and the average family size was 2.71.

The median age in the village was 49 years. 17.4% of residents were under the age of 18; 8.6% were between the ages of 18 and 24; 17.9% were from 25 to 44; 36.2% were from 45 to 64; and 19.7% were 65 years of age or older. The gender makeup of the village was 51.8% male and 48.2% female.

=== 2000 census ===
As of the census of 2000, there were 241 people, 106 households, and 71 families living in the village. The population density was 1,332.1 inhabitants per square mile (514.3/km^{2}). There were 107 housing units at an average density of 591.4 per square mile (228.3/km^{2}). The racial makeup of the village was 99.17% White and 0.83% from two or more races.

There were 106 households, out of which 28.3% had children under the age of 18 living with them, 58.5% were married couples living together, 6.6% had a female householder with no husband present, and 32.1% were non-families. 27.4% of all households were made up of individuals, and 9.4% had someone living alone who was 65 years of age or older. The average household size was 2.27 and the average family size was 2.78.

In the village, the population was spread out, with 22.4% under the age of 18, 2.1% from 18 to 24, 29.9% from 25 to 44, 29.0% from 45 to 64, and 16.6% who were 65 years of age or older. The median age was 42 years. For every 100 females there were 113.3 males. For every 100 females age 18 and over, there were 114.9 males.

The median income for a household in the village was $35,833, and the median income for a family was $41,023. Males had a median income of $34,250 versus $12,361 for females. The per capita income for the village was $18,021. About 4.0% of families and 7.0% of the population were below the poverty line, including 3.5% of those under the age of eighteen and none of those 65 or over.
