= Eastport, Ohio =

Unincorporated community in Ohio, U.S.

Coordinates: 40°25′33″N 81°21′11″W

Eastport is an unincorporated community in Tuscarawas County, in the U.S. state of Ohio.

== History ==
Eastport was laid out and platted in 1833. A post office called Eastport was established in 1835, and remained in operation until 1849.
