= Ohio State Route 342 =

State highway in eastern Ohio, US

State Route 342

Route information
- Maintained by ODOT
- Length: 5.27 mi (8.48 km)

Major junctions
- West end: SR 258 in Perry Township
- East end: SR 800 in Freeport

Location
- Country: United States
- State: Ohio
- Counties: Tuscarawas, Harrison

Highway system
- Ohio State Highway System; Interstate; US; State; Scenic
← SR 341	→ SR 343

State Route 342 (SR 342) is a 5.27-mile-long (8.48 km) state highway in eastern Ohio. The short route connects SR 258 in the Perry Township community of West Chester to SR 800 in the village of Freeport.

== Route description ==
The state highway begins at an intersection in the center of West Chester, a community within Perry Township. SR 258 continues to the north and west of this intersection; West Chester South Road heads south. SR 342 travels due east for the 0.4-mile-long (0.64 km) portion of the route within Tuscarawas County but then shifts east-southeast as it enters Harrison County. The route travels through hilly terrain but mainly stays near the tops of ridges except when it descends into valleys in order to cross the Atkinson Creek and the Stillwater Creek. At the Stillwater Creek bridge, the route enters the village of Freeport. Within Freeport, SR 342 winds its way through the center of the village on Westchester Road, North High Street, and West Main Street. At the intersection of Main Street and Philadelphia Street, SR 342 terminates as SR 800 continues to the south and east of this intersection.

== History ==
The road connecting West Chester and Freeport (at what was then-designated SR 8) was added to the state highway system as SR 342 around 1933. The road was gravel-paved from its inception until it was paved with asphalt between 1953 and 1955. No other major changes have occurred to the route since then.

== Major intersections ==
County	Location	mi	km	Destinations	Notes
Tuscarawas	Perry Township	0.00	0.00	SR 258 / West Chester South Road – Peoli, Stillwater	
Harrison	Freeport	5.27	8.48	SR 800 (East Main Street / Philadelphia Street) – Dennison, Barnesville	
1.000 mi = 1.609 km; 1.000 km = 0.621 mi
