= Ohio State Route 258 =

State highway in eastern Ohio, US

State Route 258

Route information
- Maintained by ODOT
- Length: 25.64 mi (41.26 km)

Major junctions
- West end: US 36 in Newcomerstown
- East end: SR 800 in Stillwater

Location
- Country: United States
- State: Ohio
- Counties: Tuscarawas, Guernsey, Harrison

Highway system
- Ohio State Highway System; Interstate; US; State; Scenic
← SR 257	→ SR 259

State Route 258 (SR 258, OH 258) is a state highway that runs 25.64 miles (41.26 km) in eastern Ohio. It travels from US 36 in Newcomerstown to SR 800 in Rush Township community of Stillwater. Most of the route is in Tuscarawas County but the route briefly enters Guernsey and Harrison Counties.

== Route description ==
SR 258 begins at a signalized intersection with US 36 in Newcomertown, Tuscarawas County. This intersection is about 2 miles (3.2 km) west of I-77's exit 65. The route heads south as Piling Street before crossing the Tuscarawas River and turning east. The route parallels the river and farmland until it crosses under I-77 without an interchange. The route heads southeast into more hilly terrain. After climbing a hill, SR 258 turns left. On this alignment, the route generally stays on the hills' ridges as it passes the community of Peoli and briefly dips into Guernsey County. Now heading northeast, SR 258 reenters Tuscarawas County and enters the small community of West Chester. In the center of town, SR 258 reaches the western terminus of SR 342; at this stop-controlled intersection, SR 258 heads north and begins a descent to a valley. As it travels in a flat area curving around surrounding hills, the route enters Harrison County. The route reenters Tuscarawas County one last time before curving northeast and southeast in the community of Stillwater where it ends at a stop-controlled intersection with SR 800.

No segments of SR 258 are included within the National Highway System.

== History ==
SR 258 was first designated around 1926 on an alignment between Washington Township at US 21 and SR 8 in Stillwater. This routing would remain intact until it was extended to Newcomerstown between 1967 and 1969. US 21 was removed from the state highway system upon the completion of I-77 and SR 258 was signed along the former US 21 routing from Washington Township to Newcomerstown. Also around this time, SR 8 at SR 258's eastern terminus became SR 800. Since then, there have been no major changes along the route.

== Major intersections ==
County	Location	mi	km	Destinations	Notes
Tuscarawas	Newcomerstown	0.00	0.00	US 36 to I-77 – Coshocton, Port Washington	
Guernsey	No major junctions				
Tuscarawas	Perry Township	17.94	28.87	SR 342 east / West Chester South Road – Freeport	Western terminus of SR 342
Harrison	No major junctions				
Tuscarawas	Rush Township	25.64	41.26	SR 800 – Freeport, Dennison	
1.000 mi = 1.609 km; 1.000 km = 0.621 mi
