= Ohio State Route 799 =

State highway in Harrison County, Ohio, US

State Route 799

Route information
- Maintained by ODOT
- Length: 6.05 mi (9.74 km)
- Existed: 1949–present

Major junctions
- West end: SR 800 near Freeport
- East end: CR 21 / CR 60 near Deersville

Location
- Country: United States
- State: Ohio
- Counties: Harrison

Highway system
- Ohio State Highway System; Interstate; US; State; Scenic
← SR 798	→ SR 800

State Route 799 (SR 799) is an east–west state highway located in the eastern portion of the U.S. state of Ohio. The highway runs from its western terminus at a T-intersection with SR 800 approximately 1.25 miles (2.01 km) northeast of Freeport to its eastern terminus at its intersection with Redeye Road (County Road 60 or CR 60) about three miles (4.8 km) south of Deersville. Continuing north from SR 799's eastern terminus is Mallarnee Road (CR 21).

SR 799 was created in the late 1940s. This two-lane spur route was established to improve access to the Clendening Lake region. In addition, it provides an improved route from SR 800 to the village of Deersville. SR 799 is designated as a part of the Tappan-Moravian Trail Scenic Byway.

== Route description ==
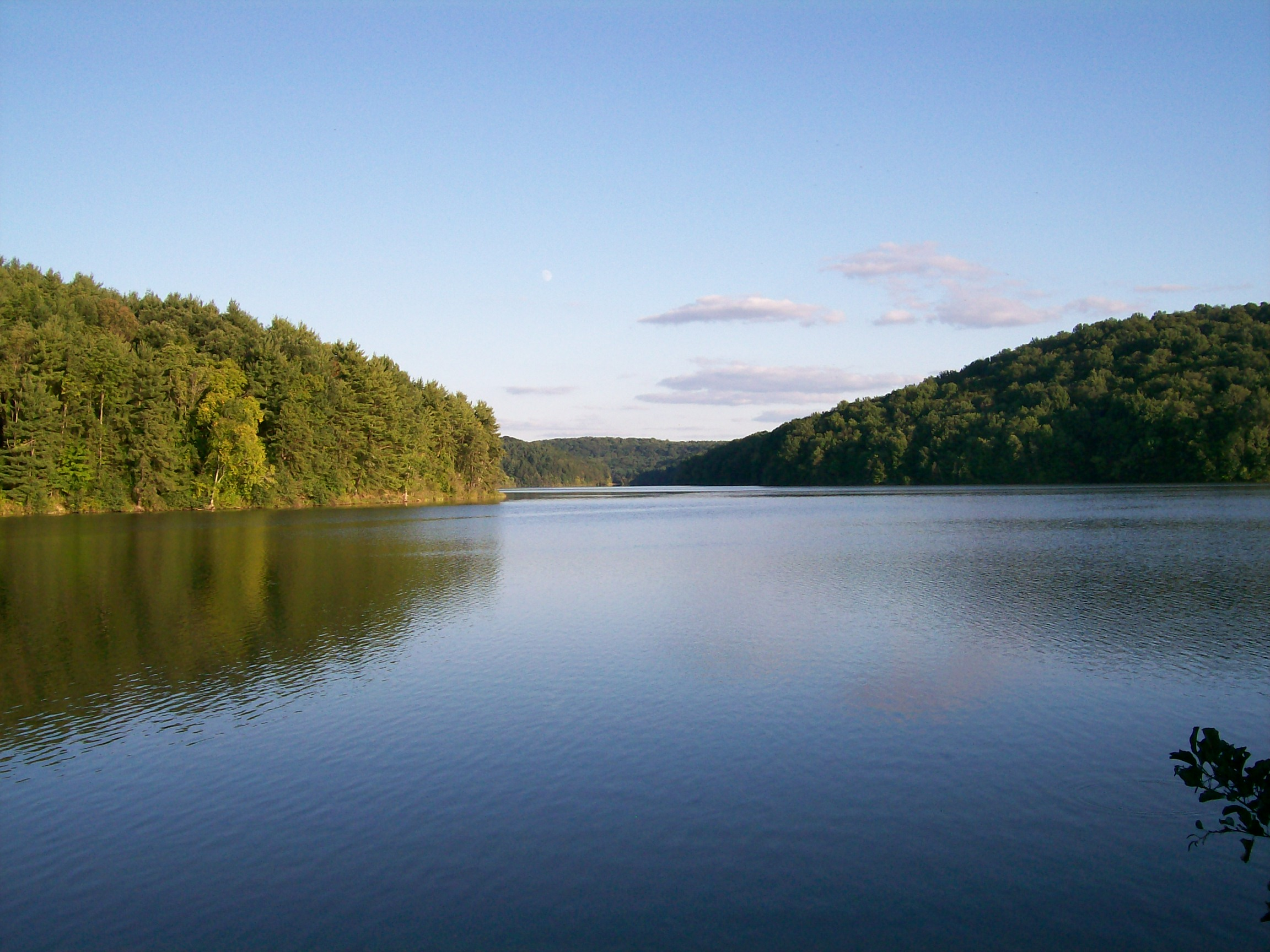
Clendening Lake from SR 799

This state highway exists entirely within the western part of Harrison County. SR 799 is not a part of the National Highway System.

SR 799 begins at a T-intersection with SR 800 in Washington Township 1.25 miles (2.01 km) northeast of Freeport. From this point, passing first amidst some open fields before entering into a more forested terrain, with the occasional house appearing along the way, SR 799 roughly parallels the Clendening Lake shoreline about one-quarter mile (0.40 km) to the south, in the process entering Nottingham Township, dipping briefly into Moorefield Township before turning north, re-entering Nottingham Township, and then following Clendening Lake's eastern edge. SR 799 crosses small bays formed by the lake twice, and comes to an end at its intersection with CR 60 (Redeye Road) just past the lake's northernmost extent. The road continues another three miles (4.8 km) north to Deersville as CR 21 (Mallarnee Road).

== History ==
SR 799 was designated in 1949. The highway has been a spur route since its inception, following the same alignment through the Clendening Lake vicinity from that point to this very day. It has not experienced any major changes to its routing since it was established.

== Major intersections ==
The entire route is in Harrison County.

Location	mi	km	Destinations	Notes
Washington Township	0.00	0.00	SR 800 – Freeport, Dennison	
Nottingham Township	6.05	9.74	CR 21 (Mallarnee Road) / CR 60 (Redeye Road)	
1.000 mi = 1.609 km; 1.000 km = 0.621 mi
