= Wheeling Township, Ohio =

Wheeling Township, Ohio may refer to:

- Wheeling Township, Belmont County, Ohio
- Wheeling Township, Guernsey County, Ohio
