= National Register of Historic Places listings in Harrison County, Ohio =

Location of Harrison County in Ohio

This is a list of the National Register of Historic Places listings in Harrison County, Ohio.

It is intended to be a complete list of the properties and districts on the National Register of Historic Places in Harrison County, Ohio, United States. The locations of National Register properties and districts for which the latitude and longitude coordinates are included below, may be seen in a Google map.

There are 7 properties and districts listed on the National Register in the county.

This National Park Service list is complete through NPS recent listings posted March 14, 2025.

== Current listings ==
	Name on the Register	Image	Date listed	Location	City or town	Description
1	Deersville Historic District	Deersville Historic District	October 27, 2004 (#04001199)	Roughly along W. Main St. from 230 W. Main St. to 212 W. Main St. 40°18′28″N 81°11′21″W	Deersville	
2	Franklin College Building No. 5	Franklin College Building No. 5	May 8, 1987 (#87000687)	Main St. 40°11′15″N 80°59′47″W	New Athens	
3	Harrison County Courthouse	Harrison County Courthouse	July 18, 1974 (#74001524)	Courthouse Sq. 40°16′22″N 80°59′53″W	Cadiz	
4	Harrison National Bank	Harrison National Bank	December 23, 1993 (#93001438)	101 E. Market St. 40°16′22″N 80°59′48″W	Cadiz	
5	Henry Law Farm Historic District	Henry Law Farm Historic District	August 22, 2002 (#02000882)	87675 Reed Rd. 40°22′25″N 81°14′22″W	Monroe Township	
6	Ourant's School	Ourant's School	March 17, 1994 (#94000241)	Ourant Rd. west of Cadiz; 40°17′14″N 81°07′36″W	Nottingham Township	
7	John Reaves House	John Reaves House	July 15, 1977 (#77001068)	Public Sq. 40°12′37″N 81°16′04″W	Freeport	

== See also ==
- List of National Historic Landmarks in Ohio
- Listings in neighboring counties: Belmont, Carroll, Guernsey, Jefferson, Tuscarawas
- National Register of Historic Places listings in Ohio
