= Peoli, Ohio =

Unincorporated community in Ohio, U.S.

Coordinates: 40°13′38″N 81°26′18″W

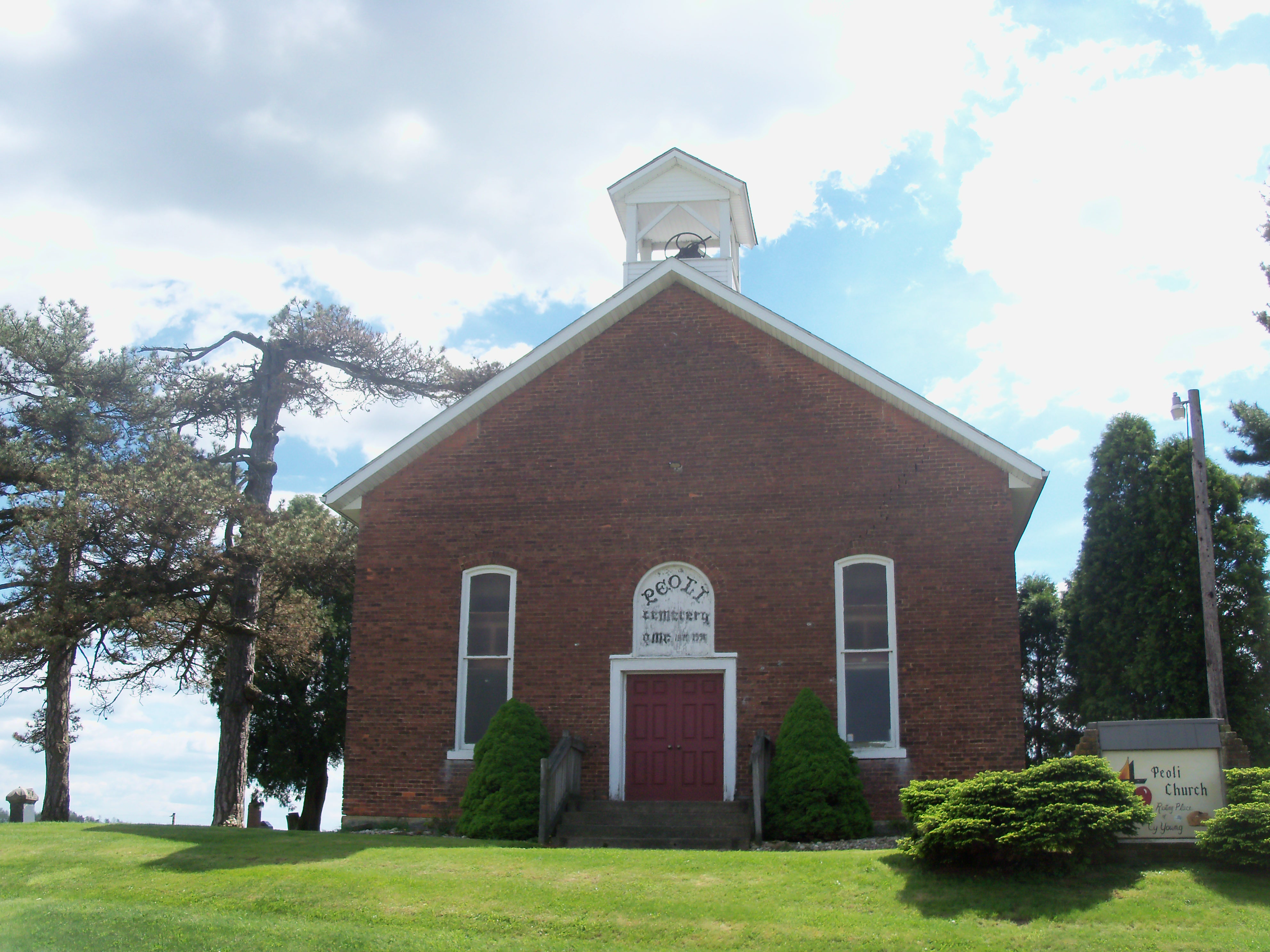
Former United Methodist Church next to graveyard with tombstone of Cy Young

Peoli is an unincorporated community in Washington Township, Tuscarawas County, Ohio, United States. It is located along State Route 258.

== Location and history ==
Situated between Newcomerstown and Freeport, Peoli is made up of approximately ten houses and includes the Peoli Church (1870 – c. 1991), and the Peoli Cemetery—the final resting place of baseball legend Cy Young. Young's house still stands outside of Peoli; it is owned by the Amish community and is currently home to their livestock.

Peoli was originally called Newtown, and under the latter name was laid out in 1817. A post office called Peoli was established in 1846, and remained in operation until 1956, the year after Young's death.

== Geography and demographics ==
Peoli lies in a rural area, the surrounding terrain consisting of many hills, ridges and valleys.

There are many farms between Peoli and Newcomerstown to the west and Birmingham to the south. There are two tin shops in the Peoli area, one on State Route 258 and one located on a county road just south of the Tuscarawas–Guernsey county line.

Peoli has a large number of Amish people. In 2008 there were two districts of Swartzentruber Amish in the Peoli – Port Washington area.
