= Washington Township, Guernsey County, Ohio =

Township in Ohio, US

- Township
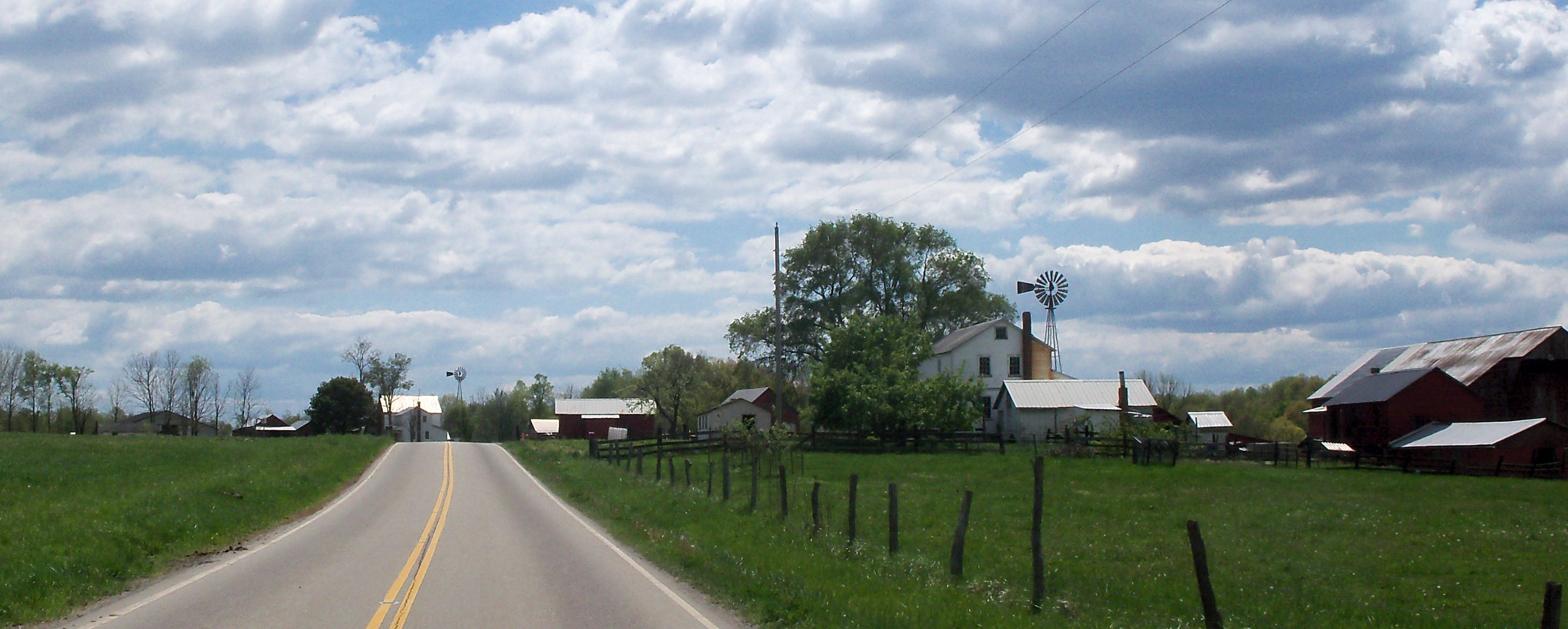
- Amish farms on Route 258

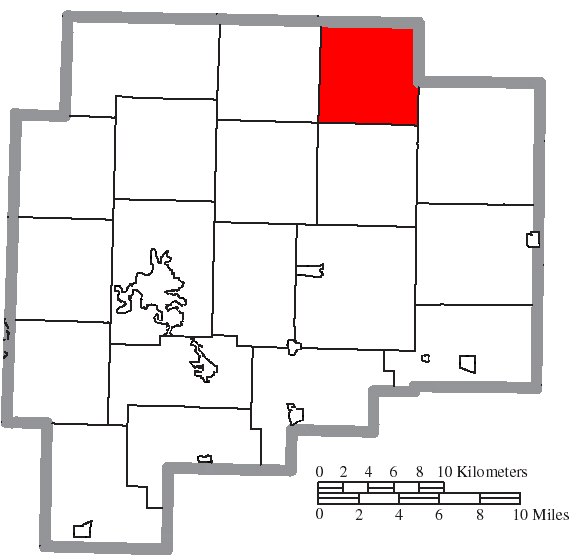
- Location of Washington Township in Guernsey County
- Coordinates: 40°10′38″N 81°23′16″W
- Country: United States
- State: Ohio
- County: Guernsey

Area
  - Total: 24.69 sq mi (63.95 km^{2})
  - Land: 24.66 sq mi (63.87 km^{2})
  - Water: 0.031 sq mi (0.08 km^{2})
- Elevation: 896 ft (273 m)

Population (2020)
  - Total: 478
  - Density: 19.4/sq mi (7.48/km^{2})
- Time zone: UTC-5 (Eastern (EST))
  - Summer (DST): UTC-4 (EDT)
- FIPS code: 39-81256
- GNIS feature ID: 1086192

Washington Township is one of the nineteen townships of Guernsey County, Ohio, United States. As of the 2020 census the population was 478.

== Geography ==
Located in the northeastern part of the county, it borders the following townships:

- Perry Township, Tuscarawas County – north
- Freeport Township, Harrison County – northeast
- Londonderry Township – southeast
- Madison Township – south
- Jefferson Township – southwest corner
- Monroe Township – west

No municipalities are located in Washington Township.

== Name and history ==
Washington Township was organized in 1823. It is one of forty-three Washington Townships statewide.

== Government ==
The township is governed by a three-member board of trustees, who are elected in November of odd-numbered years to a four-year term beginning on the following January 1. Two are elected in the year after the presidential election and one is elected in the year before it. There is also an elected township fiscal officer, who serves a four-year term beginning on April 1 of the year after the election, which is held in November of the year before the presidential election. Vacancies in the fiscal officership or on the board of trustees are filled by the remaining trustees.
