= Smyrna, Ohio =

Unincorporated community in Ohio, U.S.

Coordinates: 40°10′18″N 81°14′37″W

Smyrna is an unincorporated community in Freeport Township, Harrison County, in the U.S. state of Ohio. Smyrna is located in southeast Freeport Township next to the southern boundary of the township and county.

== History ==
Smyrna was platted in 1817.

The Smyrna Post Office (at latitude 40° 10' 20" N, longitude 81° 14' 39" W) was established on 12 February 1827 and discontinued on 31 July 1907; mail service has since been provided by the Freeport post office.
