= Marion Reed =

American politician and minister

Marion D. Reed (born 6 March 1860) was an American politician and Congregationalist minister.

Reed was born on 6 March 1860 and raised in Guernsey, Ohio, until the age of sixteen. He was then educated in the common schools of Corydon, Iowa. Upon graduating, Reed became a schoolteacher. Subsequently, he operated a granary and a general store for four years. After divesting from his business interests, Reed studied theology at Oberlin College. Reed began his career as a Congregationalist minister in 1890, when he returned to Iowa and served as a missionary in Ida and Sac Counties. Reed relocated to Exira in 1893. Shortly thereafter, he was elected to the Iowa House of Representatives as a Republican legislator from District 34, which he served until 1896.
