= Washington Township, Harrison County, Ohio =

Township in Ohio, US

- Township
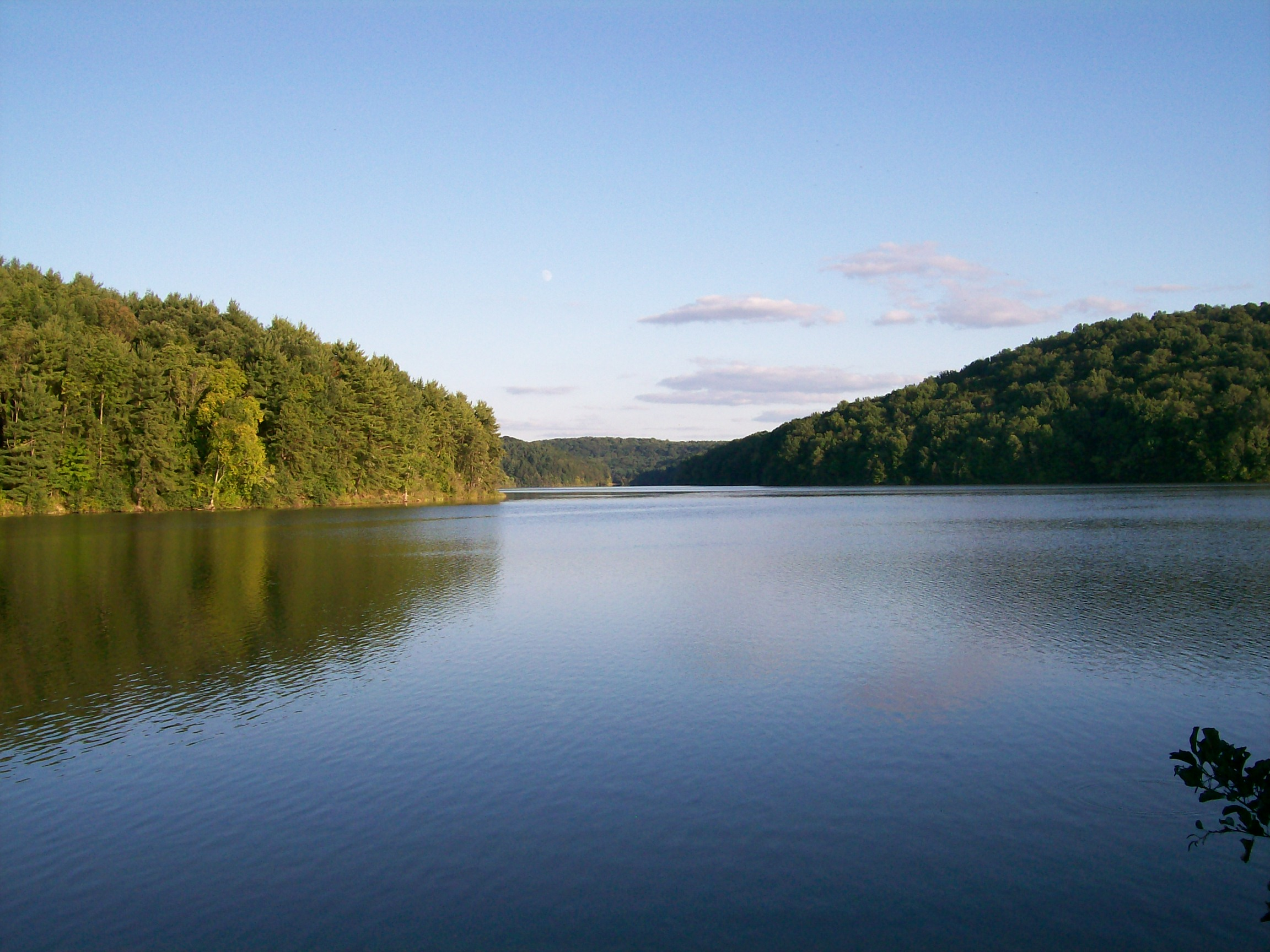
- Clendening Lake from State Route 799

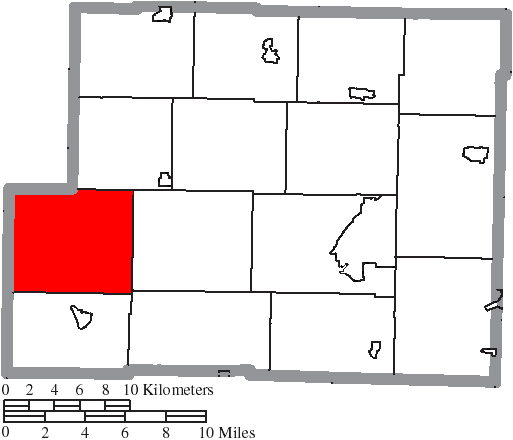
- Location of Washington Township in Harrison County
- Coordinates: 40°16′1″N 81°16′49″W
- Country: United States
- State: Ohio
- County: Harrison

Area
  - Total: 31.6 sq mi (81.9 km^{2})
  - Land: 30.3 sq mi (78.5 km^{2})
  - Water: 1.3 sq mi (3.4 km^{2})
- Elevation: 860 ft (262 m)

Population (2020)
  - Total: 640
  - Density: 21/sq mi (8.2/km^{2})
- Time zone: UTC-5 (Eastern (EST))
  - Summer (DST): UTC-4 (EDT)
- FIPS code: 39-81312
- GNIS feature ID: 1086285

Washington Township is one of the fifteen townships of Harrison County, Ohio, United States. As of the 2020 census the population was 640.

== Geography ==
Located in the western part of the county, it borders the following townships:

- Franklin Township - northeast
- Nottingham Township - east
- Moorefield Township - southeast
- Freeport Township - south
- Perry Township, Tuscarawas County - southwest
- Rush Township, Tuscarawas County - northwest

No municipalities are located in Washington Township, although the census-designated place of Tippecanoe is located at the center of the township.

== Name and history ==
It is one of forty-three Washington Townships statewide.

== Government ==
The township is governed by a three-member board of trustees, who are elected in November of odd-numbered years to a four-year term beginning on the following January 1. Two are elected in the year after the presidential election and one is elected in the year before it. There is also an elected township fiscal officer, who serves a four-year term beginning on April 1 of the year after the election, which is held in November of the year before the presidential election. Vacancies in the fiscal officership or on the board of trustees are filled by the remaining trustees.
