= Tippecanoe, Ohio =

- Census-designated place
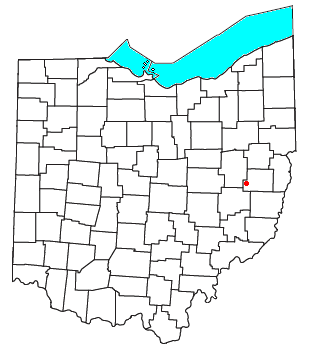
- Location of Tippecanoe, Ohio
- Coordinates: 40°16′26″N 81°16′52″W
- Country: United States
- State: Ohio
- County: Harrison
- Township: Washington

Area
  - Total: 0.54 sq mi (1.39 km^{2})
  - Land: 0.54 sq mi (1.39 km^{2})
  - Water: 0 sq mi (0.00 km^{2})
- Elevation: 1,060 ft (320 m)

Population (2020)
  - Total: 83
  - Density: 154.6/sq mi (59.68/km^{2})
- Time zone: UTC-5 (Eastern (EST))
  - Summer (DST): UTC-4 (EDT)
- ZIP code: 44699
- Area code: 740
- FIPS code: 39-76890
- GNIS feature ID: 2628978

Tippecanoe is an unincorporated community and census-designated place (CDP) in central Washington Township, Harrison County, Ohio, United States. It is located along State Route 800 in the valley of Stillwater Creek, a north-flowing tributary of the Tuscarawas River. It had a post office until 2011 with the ZIP code 44699. The population was 83 at the 2020 census.

== History ==
Tippecanoe was platted in 1840. The community derives its name from the county namesake General William Henry Harrison's nickname, Tippecanoe, which, in turn, was derived from his heroism at the Battle of Tippecanoe, November 7, 1811. A post office was established at Tippecanoe in 1841, and remained in operation until it was discontinued in 2011.

== Geography ==
Tippecanoe is in southwestern Harrison County, 12 miles (19 km) south of Uhrichsville and 5 miles (8 km) north of Freeport via State Route 800. Cadiz, the Harrison county seat, is 20 miles (32 km) to the east via county roads. Tippecanoe is less than one mile west of Clendening Dam, the outlet of Clendening Lake.

According to the United States Census Bureau, the CDP has a total area of 0.54 square miles (1.39 km^{2}), all land.

== Demographics ==
Historical population
Census	Pop.	Note	%±
2020	83		—
U.S. Decennial Census
