= Skull Fork =

Stream in Ohio, U.S.

Coordinates: 40°12′4″N 81°16′24″W

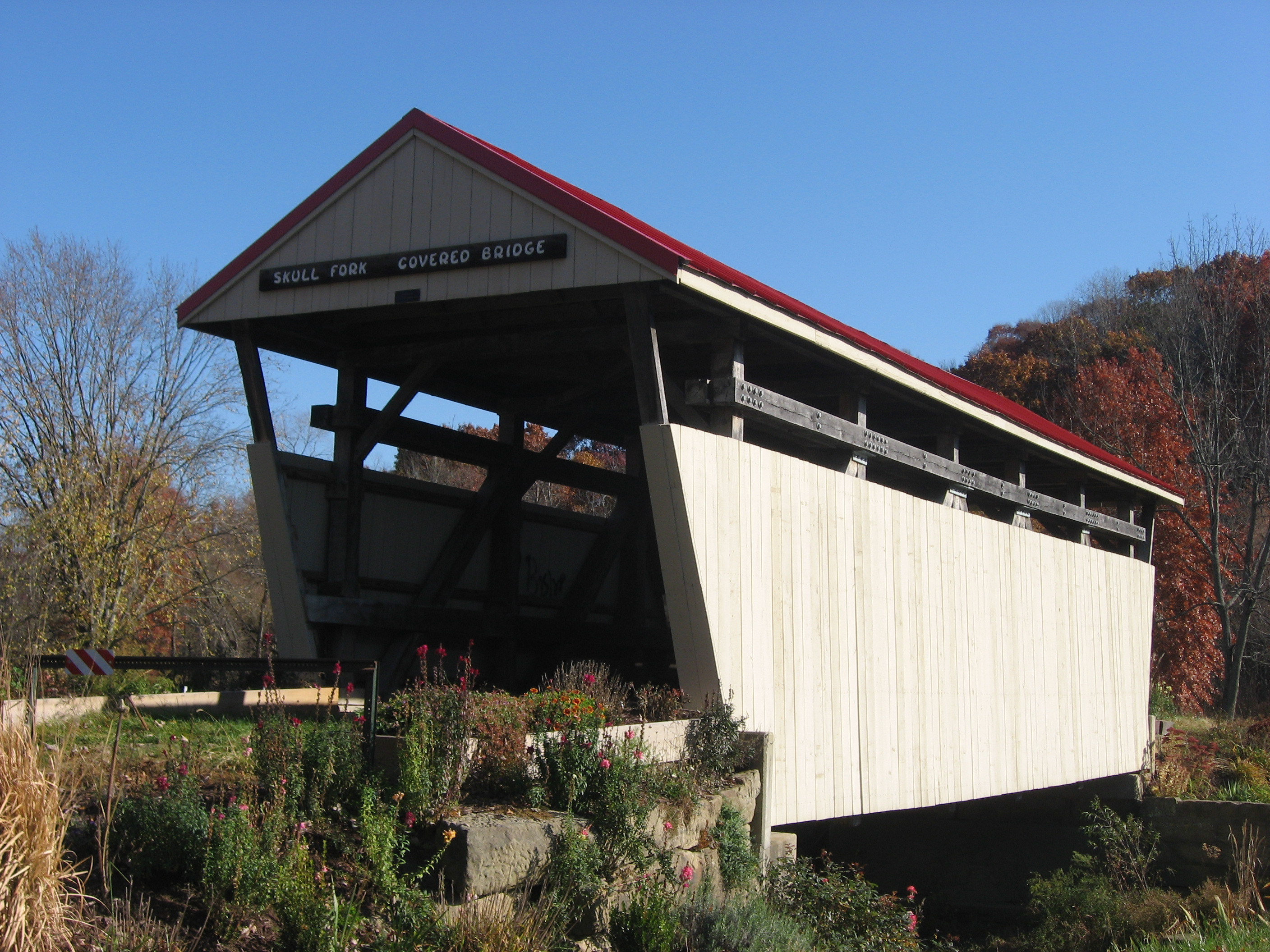
Covered bridge over the Skull Fork in Freeport Township, Harrison County

Skull Fork is a stream in the U.S. state of Ohio.

According to legend, local Indians had kidnapped and murdered some individuals whose skulls were found near this creek.

== See also ==
- List of rivers of Ohio
