= Liberty Township, Guernsey County, Ohio =

Township in Ohio, US

- Township
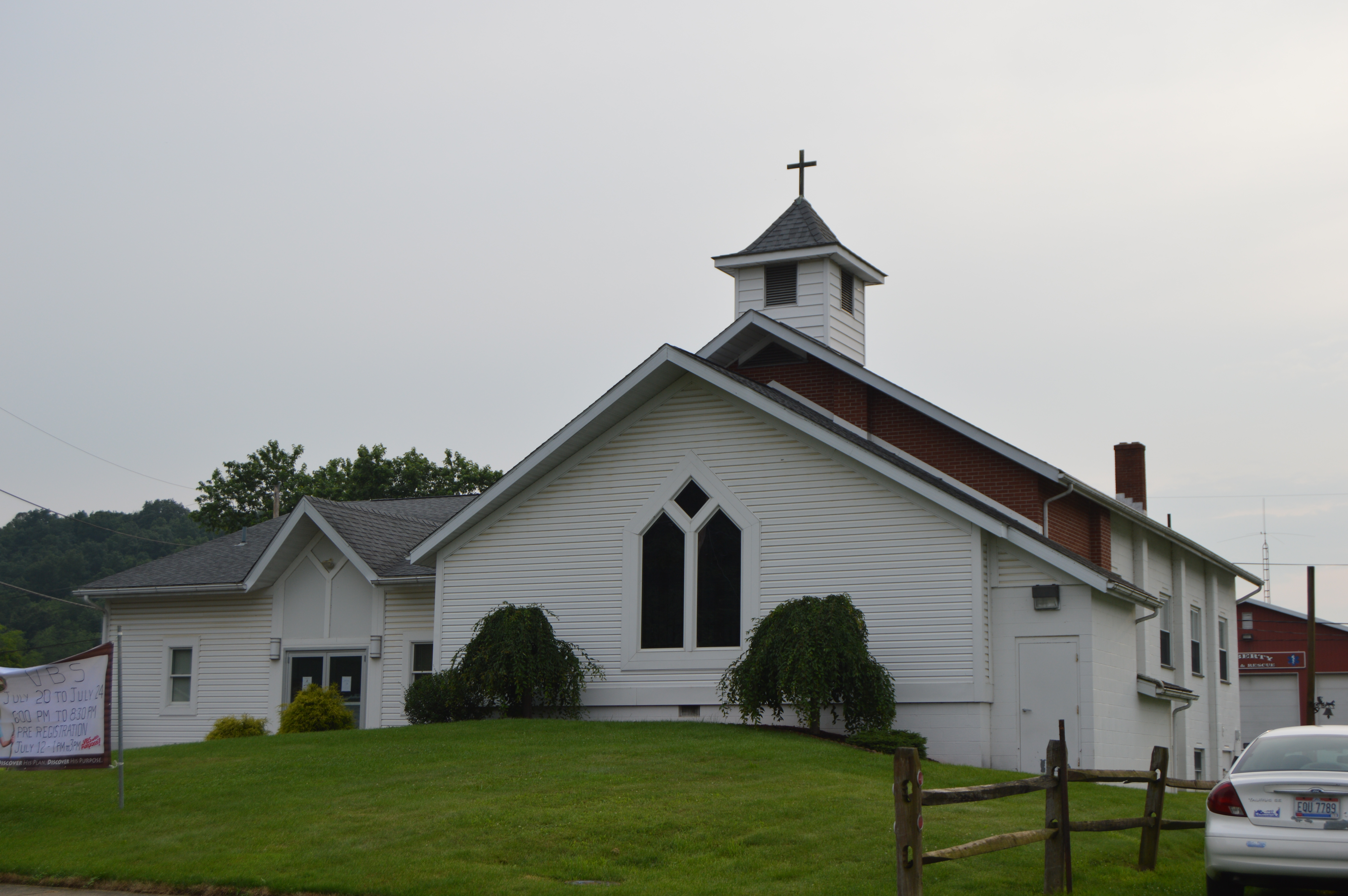
- Methodist church in Kimbolton

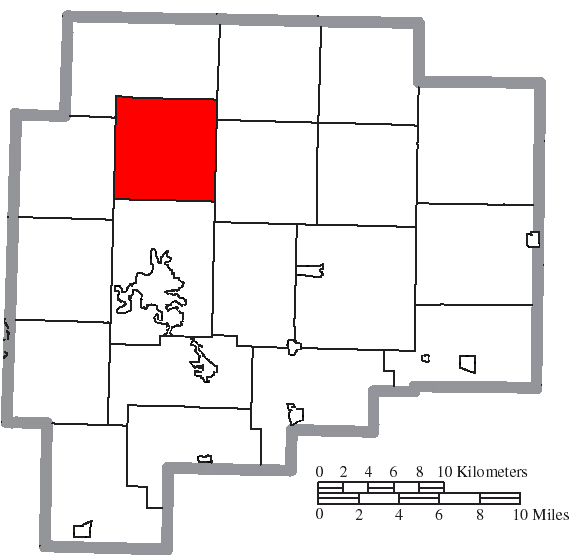
- Location of Liberty Township in Guernsey County
- Coordinates: 40°7′49″N 81°34′28″W
- Country: United States
- State: Ohio
- County: Guernsey

Area
  - Total: 25.3 sq mi (65.4 km^{2})
  - Land: 24.0 sq mi (62.2 km^{2})
  - Water: 1.2 sq mi (3.2 km^{2})
- Elevation: 790 ft (240 m)

Population (2020)
  - Total: 884
  - Density: 36.8/sq mi (14.2/km^{2})
- Time zone: UTC-5 (Eastern (EST))
  - Summer (DST): UTC-4 (EDT)
- FIPS code: 39-43134
- GNIS feature ID: 1086183

Liberty Township is one of the nineteen townships of Guernsey County, Ohio, United States. As of the 2020 census the population was 884.

== Geography ==
Located in the northwestern part of the county, it borders the following townships:

- Wheeling Township - north
- Monroe Township - northeast
- Jefferson Township - east
- Cambridge Township - south
- Knox Township - west

The unincorporated community of Kimbolton, a census-designated place, is located in northern Liberty Township.

== Name and history ==
Liberty Township was established in 1820. It is one of twenty-five Liberty Townships statewide.

== Government ==
The township is governed by a three-member board of trustees, who are elected in November of odd-numbered years to a four-year term beginning on the following January 1. Two are elected in the year after the presidential election and one is elected in the year before it. There is also an elected township fiscal officer, who serves a four-year term beginning on April 1 of the year after the election, which is held in November of the year before the presidential election. Vacancies in the fiscal officership or on the board of trustees are filled by the remaining trustees.
