= Monroe Township, Guernsey County, Ohio =

Township in Ohio, US

- Township
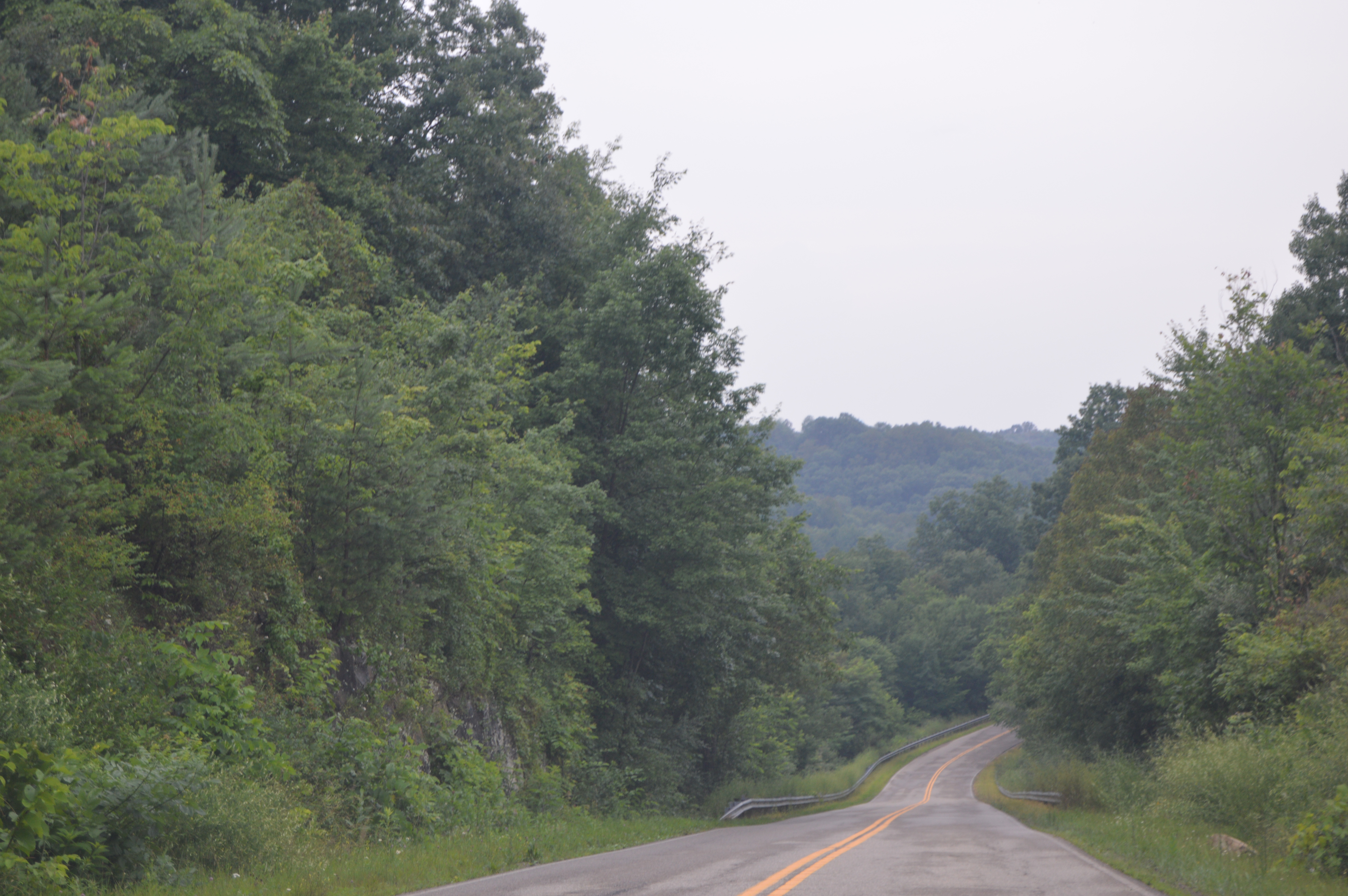
- Woodland scene on County Road 851

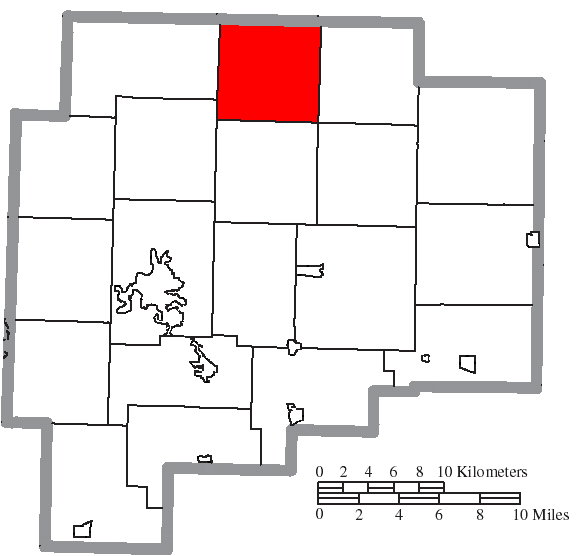
- Location of Monroe Township in Guernsey County
- Coordinates: 40°11′3″N 81°28′57″W
- Country: United States
- State: Ohio
- County: Guernsey

Area
  - Total: 25.1 sq mi (65.1 km^{2})
  - Land: 25.0 sq mi (64.7 km^{2})
  - Water: 0.15 sq mi (0.4 km^{2})
- Elevation: 1,020 ft (310 m)

Population (2020)
  - Total: 730
  - Density: 29/sq mi (11/km^{2})
- Time zone: UTC-5 (Eastern (EST))
  - Summer (DST): UTC-4 (EDT)
- FIPS code: 39-51380
- GNIS feature ID: 1086187

Monroe Township is one of the nineteen townships of Guernsey County, Ohio, United States. As of the 2020 census the population was 730.

== Geography ==
Located in the northern part of the county, it borders the following townships:

- Washington Township, Tuscarawas County - north
- Perry Township, Tuscarawas County - northeast
- Washington Township - east
- Madison Township - southeast corner
- Jefferson Township - south
- Liberty Township - southwest
- Wheeling Township - west
- Oxford Township, Tuscarawas County - northwest corner

No municipalities are located in Monroe Township, although the unincorporated community of Birmingham lies in the township's southeast.

== Name and history ==
Monroe Township was established in 1818. It is one of twenty-two Monroe Townships statewide.

== Government ==
The township is governed by a three-member board of trustees, who are elected in November of odd-numbered years to a four-year term beginning on the following January 1. Two are elected in the year after the presidential election and one is elected in the year before it. There is also an elected township fiscal officer, who serves a four-year term beginning on April 1 of the year after the election, which is held in November of the year before the presidential election. Vacancies in the fiscal officership or on the board of trustees are filled by the remaining trustees.
