= Madison Township, Guernsey County, Ohio =

Township in Ohio, US

- Township
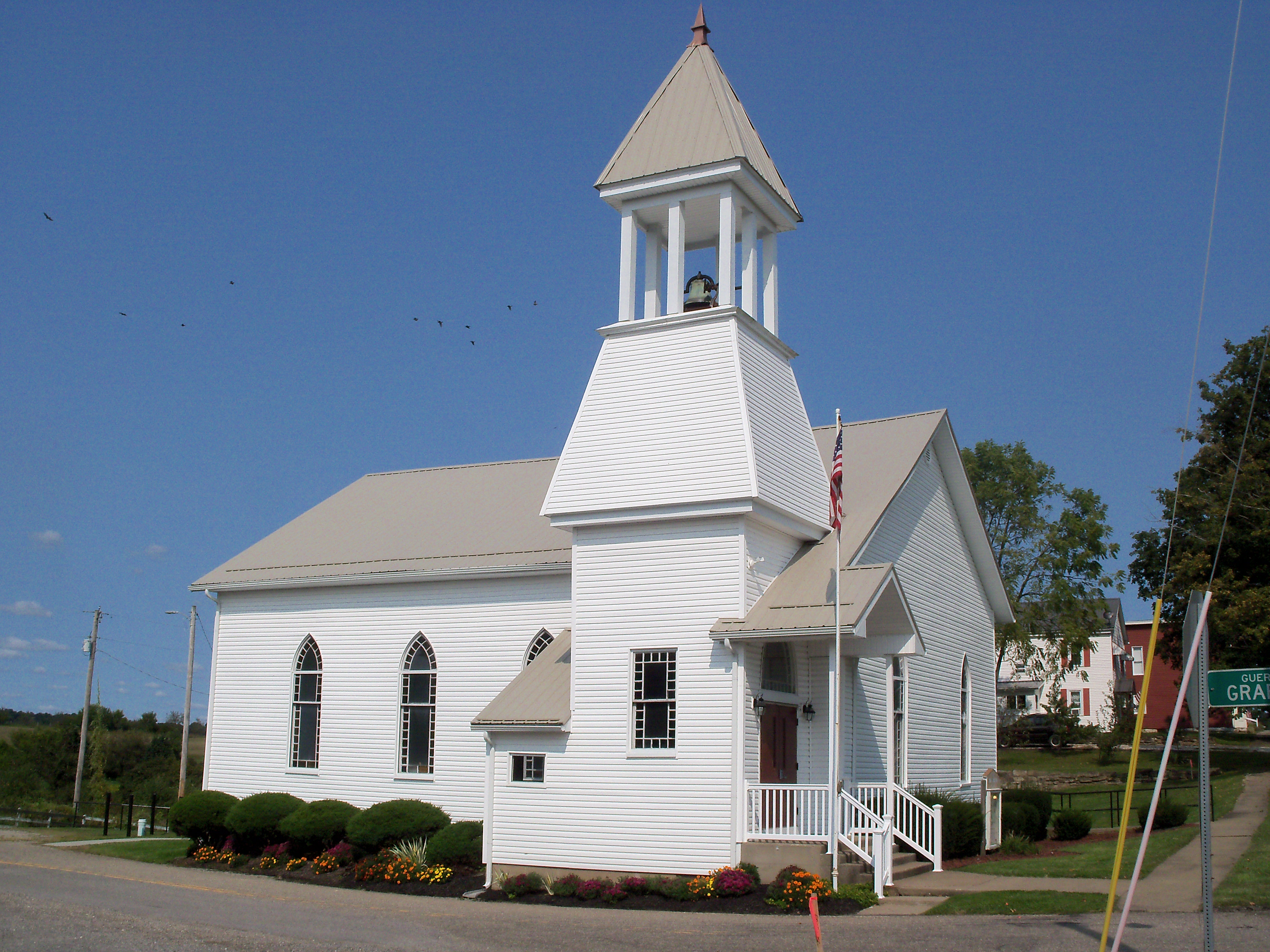
- Antrim United Methodist Church

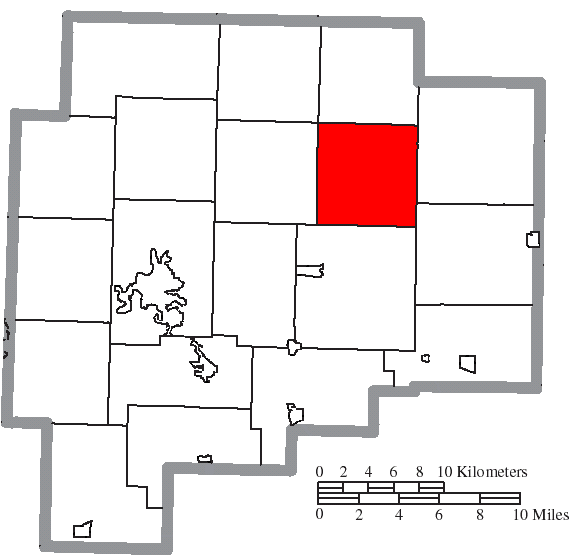
- Location of Madison Township in Guernsey County
- Coordinates: 40°6′25″N 81°23′43″W
- Country: United States
- State: Ohio
- County: Guernsey

Area
  - Total: 24.9 sq mi (64.6 km^{2})
  - Land: 24.9 sq mi (64.5 km^{2})
  - Water: 0.039 sq mi (0.1 km^{2})
- Elevation: 820 ft (250 m)

Population (2020)
  - Total: 969
  - Density: 38.9/sq mi (15.0/km^{2})
- Time zone: UTC-5 (Eastern (EST))
  - Summer (DST): UTC-4 (EDT)
- FIPS code: 39-46424
- GNIS feature ID: 1086185

Madison Township is one of the nineteen townships of Guernsey County, Ohio, United States. As of the 2020 census the population was 969.

== Geography ==
Located in the northeastern part of the county, it borders the following townships:

- Washington Township – north
- Londonderry Township – northeast
- Oxford Township – southeast
- Wills Township – south
- Jefferson Township – west
- Monroe Township – northwest corner

No municipalities are located in Madison Township.

Antrim is an unincorporated hamlet in the township at the junction of US 22 and SR 513 and was the site of several former schools.

== Name and history ==
Madison Township was organized in 1810. It is one of twenty Madison Townships statewide.

A school named Madison College operated from 1835 through 1859.

== Government ==
The township is governed by a three-member board of trustees, who are elected in November of odd-numbered years to a four-year term beginning on the following January 1. Two are elected in the year after the presidential election and one is elected in the year before it. There is also an elected township fiscal officer, who serves a four-year term beginning on April 1 of the year after the election, which is held in November of the year before the presidential election. Vacancies in the fiscal officership or on the board of trustees are filled by the remaining trustees.
