= Oxford Township, Tuscarawas County, Ohio =

Township in Ohio, US

- Township
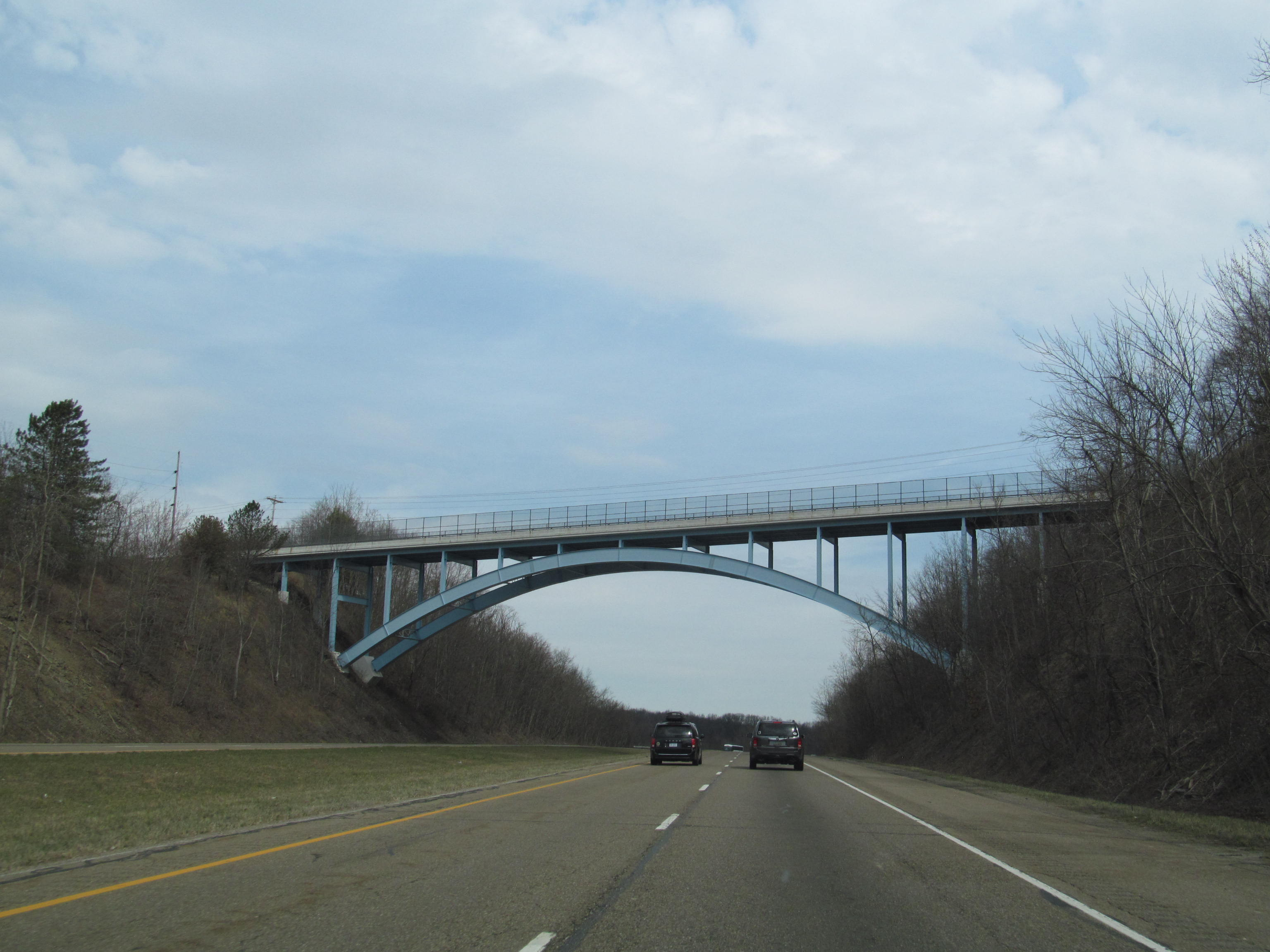
- Stocker Ridge bridge over Interstate 77

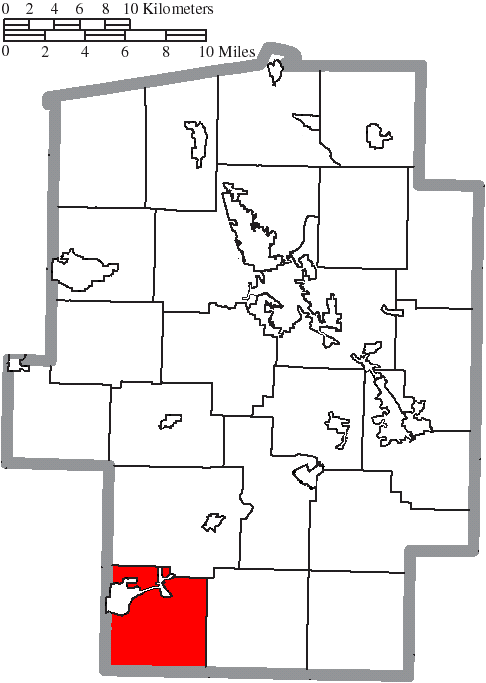
- Location of Oxford Township in Tuscarawas County
- Coordinates: 40°16′27″N 81°35′43″W
- Country: United States
- State: Ohio
- County: Tuscarawas

Area
  - Total: 24.9 sq mi (64.6 km^{2})
  - Land: 24.6 sq mi (63.8 km^{2})
  - Water: 0.31 sq mi (0.8 km^{2})
- Elevation: 804 ft (245 m)

Population (2020)
  - Total: 4,789
  - Density: 195/sq mi (75.1/km^{2})
- Time zone: UTC-5 (Eastern (EST))
  - Summer (DST): UTC-4 (EDT)
- FIPS code: 39-59304
- GNIS feature ID: 1087061

Oxford Township is one of the twenty-two townships of Tuscarawas County, Ohio, United States. The 2020 census found 4,789 people in the township.

== Geography ==
Located in the southwestern corner of the county, it borders the following townships:

- Salem Township - north
- Washington Township - east
- Monroe Township, Guernsey County - southeast corner
- Wheeling Township, Guernsey County - south
- Oxford Township, Coshocton County - west
- Adams Township, Coshocton County - northwest corner

The village of Newcomerstown is located in northern Oxford Township.

== Name and history ==
It is one of six Oxford Townships statewide.

== Government ==
The township is governed by a three-member board of trustees, who are elected in November of odd-numbered years to a four-year term beginning on the following January 1. Two are elected in the year after the presidential election and one is elected in the year before it. There is also an elected township fiscal officer, who serves a four-year term beginning on April 1 of the year after the election, which is held in November of the year before the presidential election. Vacancies in the fiscal officership or on the board of trustees are filled by the remaining trustees.
