= Freeport Township, Harrison County, Ohio =

Township in Ohio, US

- Township
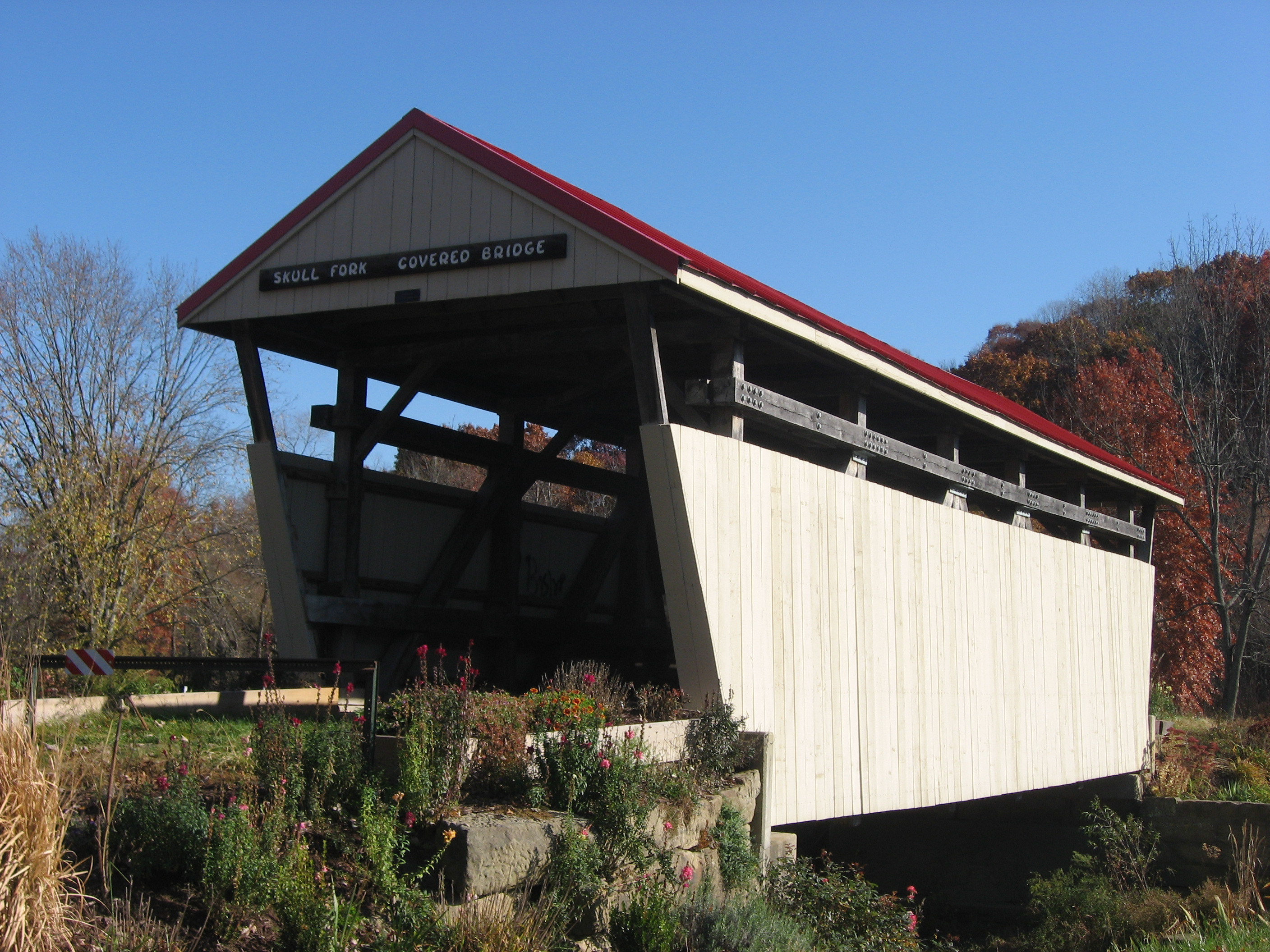
- Skull Fork Covered Bridge

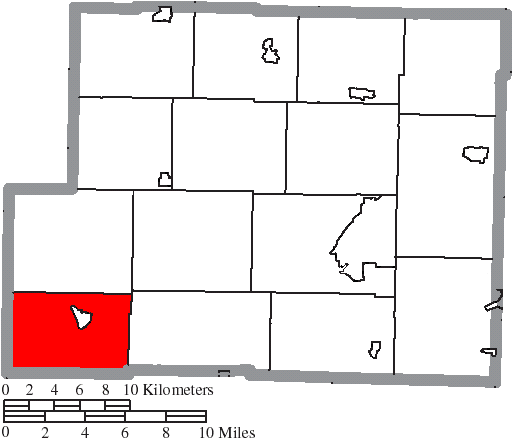
- Location of Freeport Township in Harrison County
- Coordinates: 40°12′19″N 81°17′5″W
- Country: United States
- State: Ohio
- County: Harrison

Area
  - Total: 24.1 sq mi (62.4 km^{2})
  - Land: 24.1 sq mi (62.4 km^{2})
  - Water: 0 sq mi (0.0 km^{2})
- Elevation: 876 ft (267 m)

Population (2020)
  - Total: 726
  - Density: 30.1/sq mi (11.6/km^{2})
- Time zone: UTC-5 (Eastern (EST))
  - Summer (DST): UTC-4 (EDT)
- ZIP code: 43973
- Area code: 740
- FIPS code: 39-28812
- GNIS feature ID: 1086275

Freeport Township is one of the fifteen townships of Harrison County, Ohio, United States. As of the 2020 census the population was 726.

== Geography ==
Located in the southwestern corner of the county, it borders the following townships:

- Washington Township - north
- Moorefield Township - east
- Flushing Township, Belmont County - southeast
- Londonderry Township, Guernsey County - south
- Washington Township, Guernsey County - southwest
- Perry Township, Tuscarawas County - northwest

It is the only township in the county to border Guernsey County.

The village of Freeport is located in central Freeport Township. The unincorporated community of Smyrna is located in southeast Freeport Township next to the southern boundary of the township and county.

== Name and history ==
It is the only Freeport Township statewide.

== Government ==
The township is governed by a three-member board of trustees, who are elected in November of odd-numbered years to a four-year term beginning on the following January 1. Two are elected in the year after the presidential election and one is elected in the year before it. There is also an elected township fiscal officer, who serves a four-year term beginning on April 1 of the year after the election, which is held in November of the year before the presidential election. Vacancies in the fiscal officership or on the board of trustees are filled by the remaining trustees.
