= Kimbolton, Ohio =

- Census-designated place
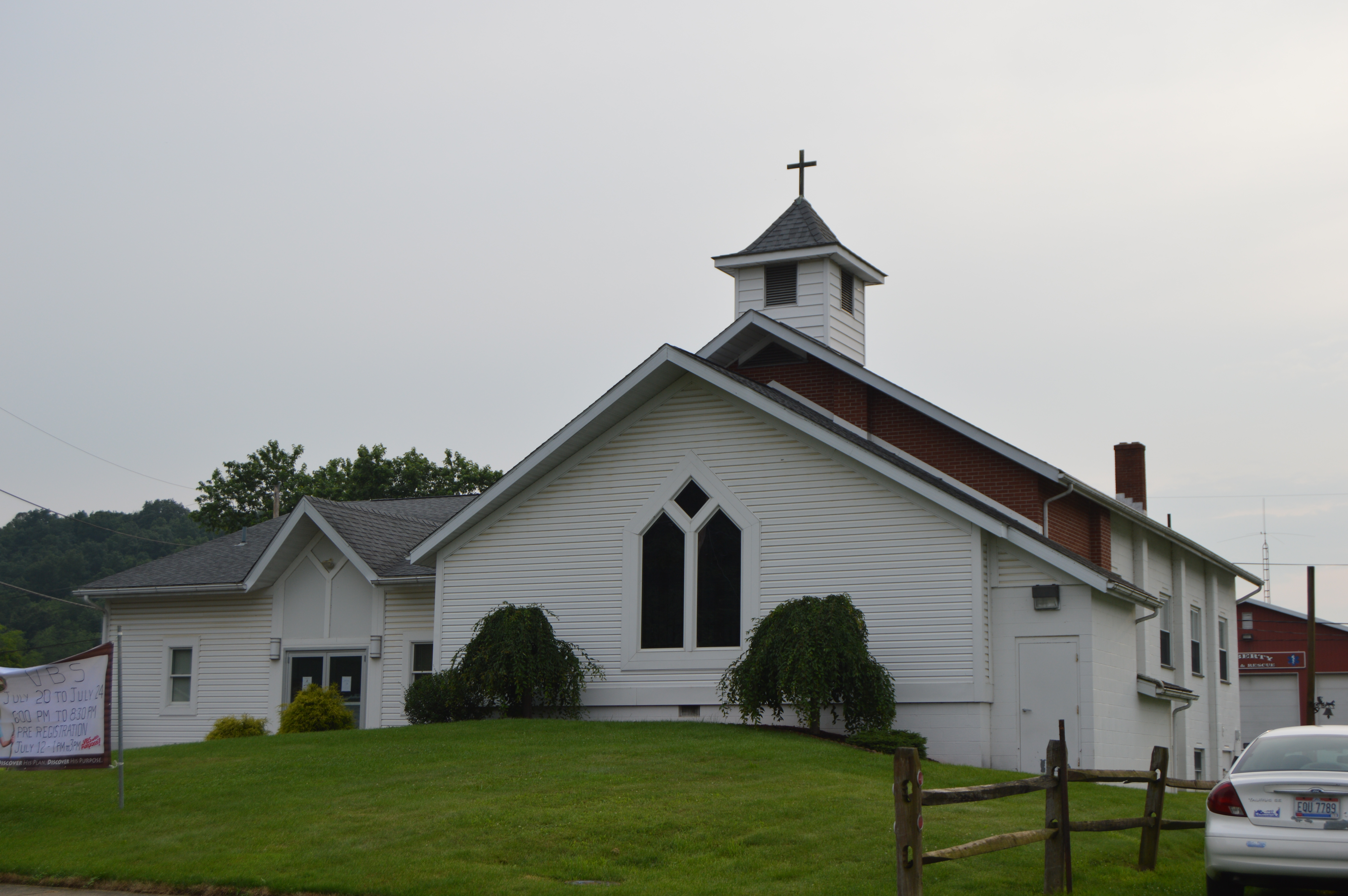
- Methodist church on Main Street

- Location within Ohio Location within the United States
- Coordinates: 40°09′03″N 81°34′33″W
- Country: United States
- State: Ohio
- County: Guernsey
- Township: Liberty

Area
  - Total: 0.50 sq mi (1.29 km^{2})
  - Land: 0.50 sq mi (1.29 km^{2})
  - Water: 0 sq mi (0.00 km^{2})
- Elevation: 801 ft (244 m)

Population (2020)
  - Total: 152
  - Density: 305.4/sq mi (117.93/km^{2})
- Time zone: UTC-5 (Eastern (EST))
  - Summer (DST): UTC-4 (EDT)
- ZIP code: 43749
- Area code: 740
- FIPS code: 39-40264
- GNIS feature ID: 2628910

Kimbolton is an unincorporated community and census-designated place in Guernsey County, Ohio, United States, along Wills Creek. The population was 152 at the 2020 census.

== History ==
Kimbolton was originally called "Liberty", and under the latter name was platted in 1828. John Gibson was the first person to lay out Liberty.

A post office called Kimbolton has been in operation since 1837. The village was incorporated as Kimbolton in 1884. The present name is derived from Kimbolton, England, the native home of a local merchant.

In March 2004, the electorate voted to surrender the corporate powers of the Village of Kimbolton to the trustees of Liberty Township. The village was officially dissolved on April 30, 2005.

== Geography ==
Kimbolton is located in northern Guernsey County in the northern part of Liberty Township. It is on Ohio State Route 541, 1 mile (1.6 km) west of Interstate 77, which leads south 9 miles (14 km) to Cambridge, the Guernsey County seat, and north 28 miles (45 km) to New Philadelphia.

According to the United States Census Bureau, the Kimbolton CDP has an area of 0.50 square miles (1.3 km^{2}), all land.

== Demographics ==
Historical population
Census	Pop.	Note	%±
2020	152		—
U.S. Decennial Census

As of the census of 2000, there were 190 people, 57 households, and 44 families residing in the village. The population density was 794.2 inhabitants per square mile (306.6/km^{2}). There were 62 housing units at an average density of 259.2 per square mile (100.1/km^{2}). The racial makeup of the village was 91.58% White, 2.63% African American, 1.05% from other races, and 4.74% from two or more races.

There were 57 households, out of which 38.6% had children under the age of 18 living with them, 66.7% were married couples living together, 7.0% had a female householder with no husband present, and 22.8% were non-families. 22.8% of all households were made up of individuals, and 15.8% had someone living alone who was 65 years of age or older. The average household size was 2.72 and the average family size was 3.20.

In the village the population was spread out, with 24.2% under the age of 18, 8.4% from 18 to 24, 25.8% from 25 to 44, 16.3% from 45 to 64, and 25.3% who were 65 years of age or older. The median age was 40 years. For every 100 females, there were 113.5 males. For every 100 females age 18 and over, there were 100.0 males.

The median income for a household in the village was $21,625, and the median income for a family was $23,750. Males had a median income of $27,500 versus $22,500 for females. The per capita income for the village was $13,370. About 23.8% of families and 30.5% of the population were below the poverty line, including 56.6% of those under the age of eighteen and none of those 65 or over.
