= Oxford Township, Coshocton County, Ohio =

Township in Ohio, US

- Township
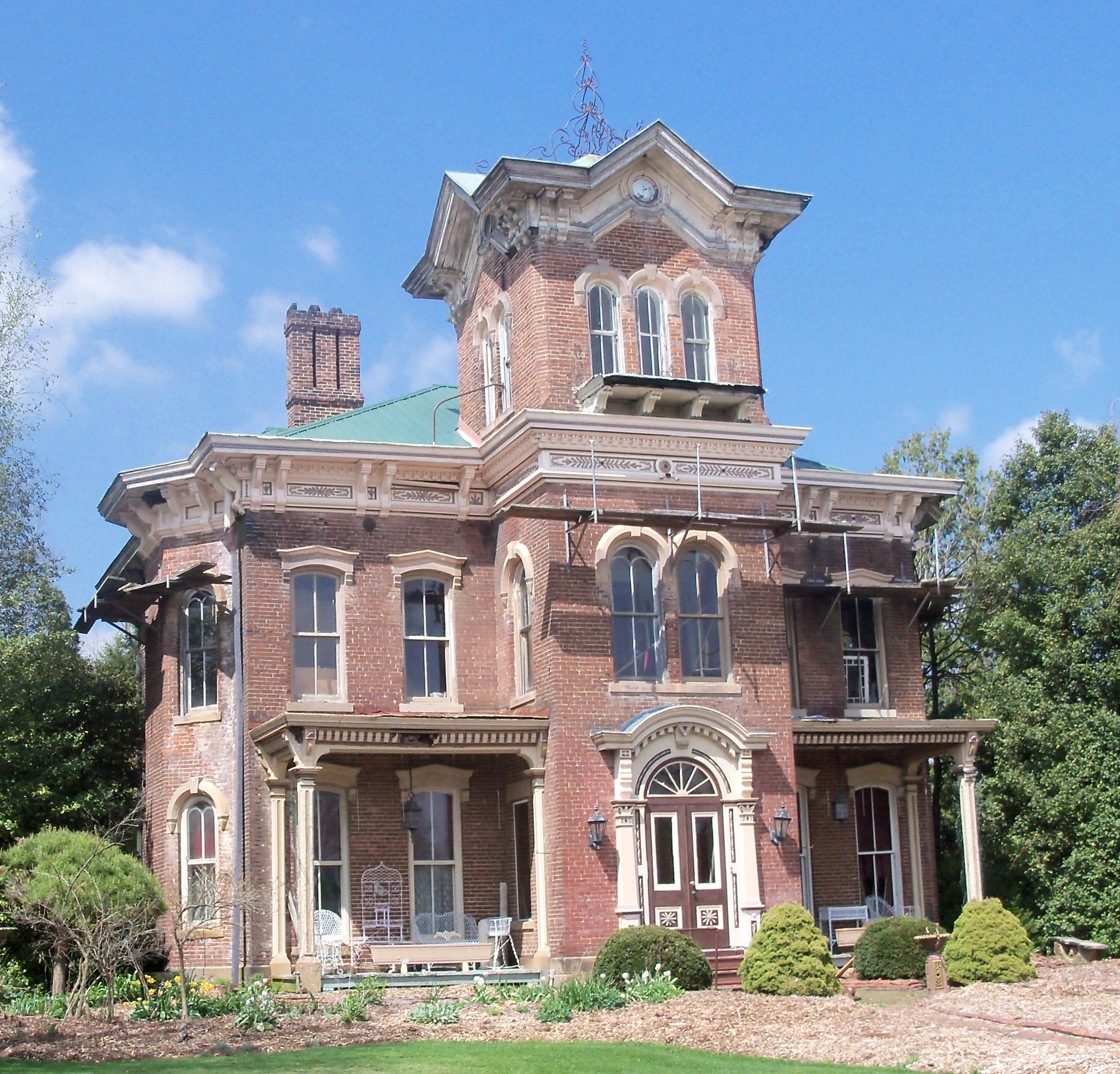
- Shady Bend Manor (1874) on County Road 9

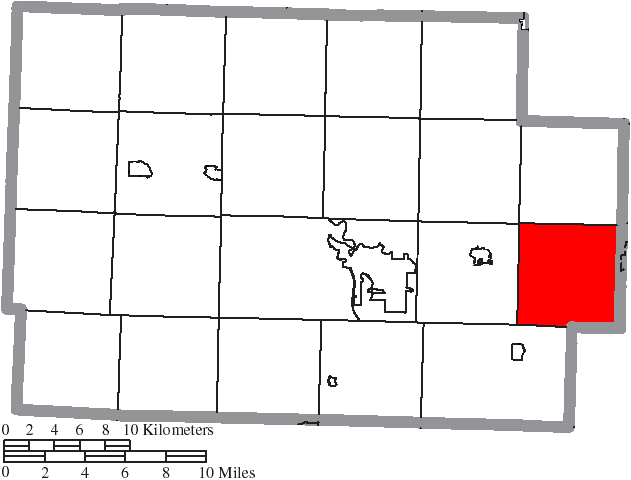
- Location of Oxford Township in Coshocton County
- Coordinates: 40°15′52″N 81°40′4″W
- Country: United States
- State: Ohio
- County: Coshocton

Area
  - Total: 25.8 sq mi (66.8 km^{2})
  - Land: 25.3 sq mi (65.4 km^{2})
  - Water: 0.54 sq mi (1.4 km^{2})
- Elevation: 801 ft (244 m)

Population (2020)
  - Total: 1,554
  - Density: 61.5/sq mi (23.8/km^{2})
- Time zone: UTC-5 (Eastern (EST))
  - Summer (DST): UTC-4 (EDT)
- FIPS code: 39-59248
- GNIS feature ID: 1085924

Oxford Township is one of the twenty-two townships of Coshocton County, Ohio, United States. The 2020 census reported 1,554 people living in the township.

== Geography ==
Located in the far eastern part of the county, it borders the following townships:

- Adams Township - north
- Salem Township, Tuscarawas County - northeast corner
- Oxford Township, Tuscarawas County - east
- Wheeling Township, Guernsey County - southeast
- Linton Township - southwest
- Lafayette Township - west
- White Eyes Township - northwest corner

No municipalities are located in Oxford Township.

== Name and history ==
It is one of six Oxford Townships statewide.

Oxford Township was organized in 1811. The Pittsburgh, Cincinnati and St. Louis Railway had a depot in Oxford Township at Oxford near the center of the township.

== Government ==
The township is governed by a three-member board of trustees, who are elected in November of odd-numbered years to a four-year term beginning on the following January 1. Two are elected in the year after the presidential election and one is elected in the year before it. There is also an elected township fiscal officer, who serves a four-year term beginning on April 1 of the year after the election, which is held in November of the year before the presidential election. Vacancies in the fiscal officership or on the board of trustees are filled by the remaining trustees.
