= Washington Township, Ohio =

Washington Township, Ohio may refer to:

- Washington Township, Auglaize County, Ohio
- Washington Township, Belmont County, Ohio
- Washington Township, Brown County, Ohio
- Washington Township, Carroll County, Ohio
- Washington Township, Clermont County, Ohio
- Washington Township, Clinton County, Ohio
- Washington Township, Columbiana County, Ohio
- Washington Township, Coshocton County, Ohio
- Washington Township, Darke County, Ohio
- Washington Township, Defiance County, Ohio
- Washington Township, Franklin County, Ohio
- Washington Township, Guernsey County, Ohio
- Washington Township, Hancock County, Ohio
- Washington Township, Hardin County, Ohio
- Washington Township, Harrison County, Ohio
- Washington Township, Henry County, Ohio
- Washington Township, Highland County, Ohio
- Washington Township, Hocking County, Ohio
- Washington Township, Holmes County, Ohio
- Washington Township, Jackson County, Ohio
- Washington Township, Lawrence County, Ohio
- Washington Township, Licking County, Ohio
- Washington Township, Logan County, Ohio
- Washington Township, Lucas County, Ohio
- Washington Township, Mercer County, Ohio
- Washington Township, Miami County, Ohio
- Washington Township, Monroe County, Ohio
- Washington Township, Montgomery County, Ohio
- Washington Township, Morrow County, Ohio
- Washington Township, Muskingum County, Ohio
- Washington Township, Paulding County, Ohio
- Washington Township, Pickaway County, Ohio
- Washington Township, Preble County, Ohio
- Washington Township, Richland County, Ohio
- Washington Township, Sandusky County, Ohio
- Washington Township, Scioto County, Ohio
- Washington Township, Shelby County, Ohio
- Washington Township, Stark County, Ohio
- Washington Township, Tuscarawas County, Ohio
- Washington Township, Union County, Ohio
- Washington Township, Van Wert County, Ohio
- Washington Township, Warren County, Ohio
- Washington Township, Wood County, Ohio
