= Londonderry Township, Guernsey County, Ohio =

Township in Ohio, US

- Township
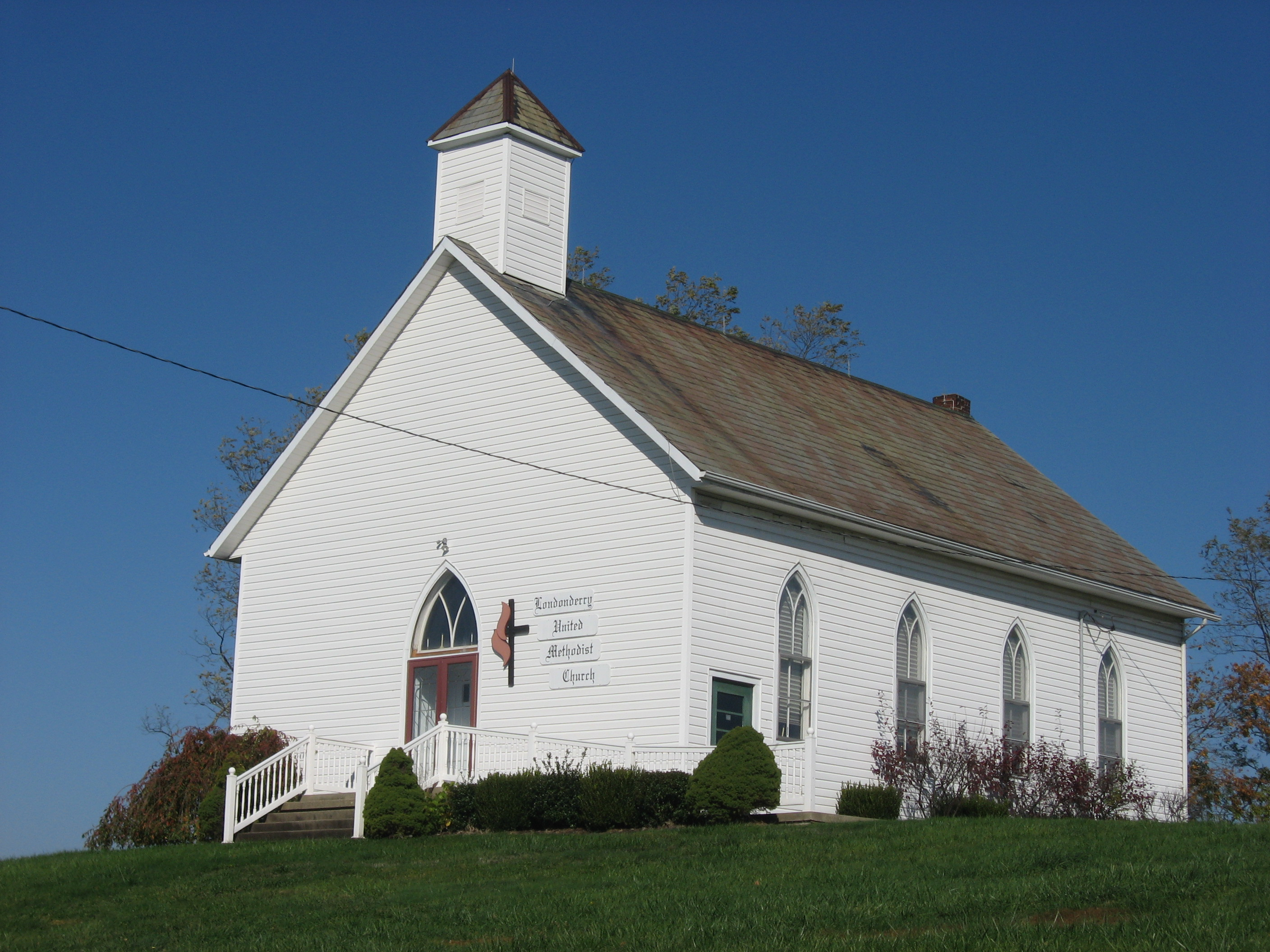
- Londonderry Methodist Church

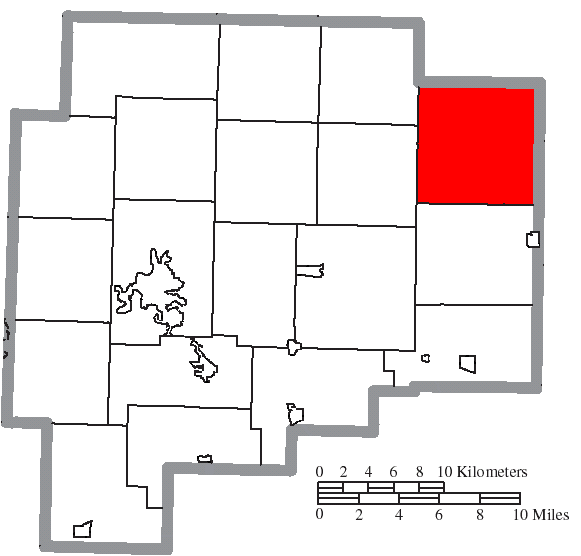
- Location of Londonderry Township in Guernsey County
- Coordinates: 40°7′57″N 81°17′8″W
- Country: United States
- State: Ohio
- County: Guernsey

Area
  - Total: 36.4 sq mi (94.2 km^{2})
  - Land: 36.3 sq mi (94.1 km^{2})
  - Water: 0.039 sq mi (0.1 km^{2})
- Elevation: 876 ft (267 m)

Population (2020)
  - Total: 710
  - Density: 20/sq mi (7.5/km^{2})
- Time zone: UTC-5 (Eastern (EST))
  - Summer (DST): UTC-4 (EDT)
- FIPS code: 39-44716
- GNIS feature ID: 1086184

Londonderry Township is one of the nineteen townships of Guernsey County, Ohio, United States. As of the 2020 census the population was 710.

== Geography ==
Located in the northeastern corner of the county, it borders the following townships:

- Freeport Township, Harrison County - north
- Flushing Township, Belmont County - northeast
- Kirkwood Township, Belmont County - southeast
- Oxford Township - south
- Madison Township - southwest
- Washington Township - northwest

No municipalities are located in Londonderry Township.

== Name and history ==
It is the only Londonderry Township statewide.

== Government ==
The township is governed by a three-member board of trustees, who are elected in November of odd-numbered years to a four-year term beginning on the following January 1. Two are elected in the year after the presidential election and one is elected in the year before it. There is also an elected township fiscal officer, who serves a four-year term beginning on April 1 of the year after the election, which is held in November of the year before the presidential election. Vacancies in the fiscal officership or on the board of trustees are filled by the remaining trustees.
