= Jefferson Township, Guernsey County, Ohio =

Township in Ohio, US

- Township
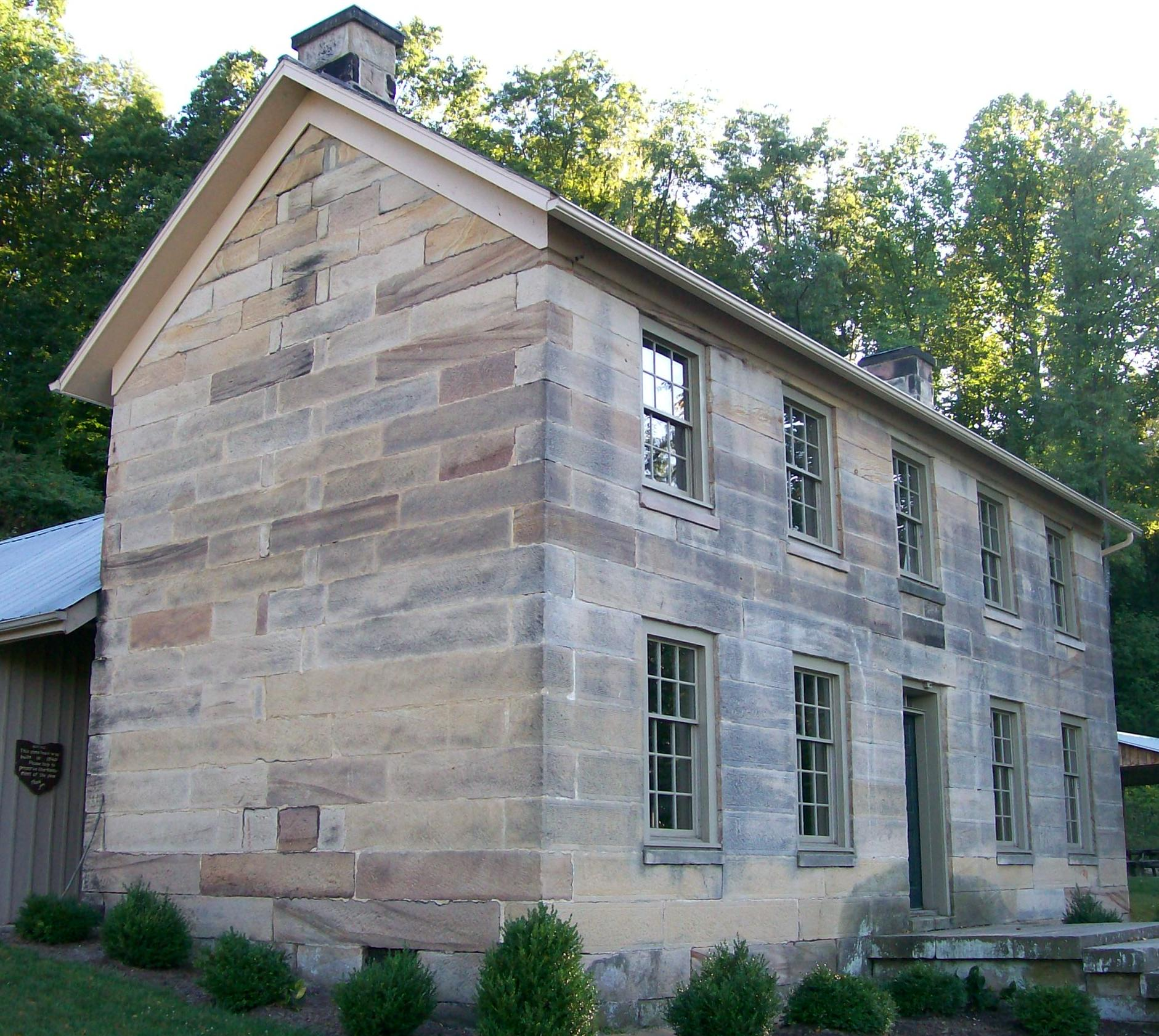
- Kennedy Stone House, built c. 1837

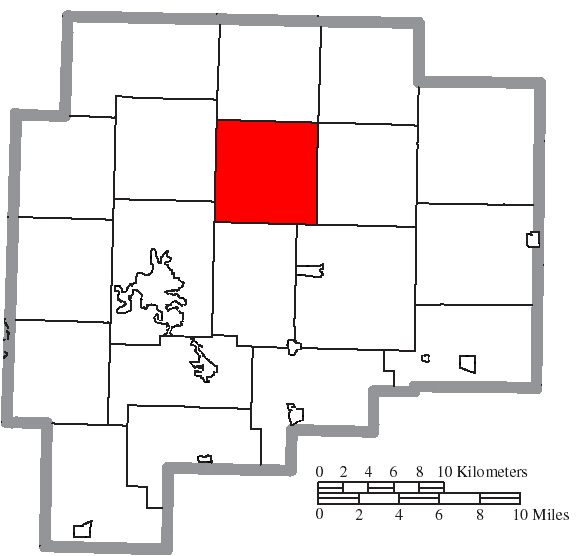
- Location of Jefferson Township in Guernsey County
- Coordinates: 40°6′26″N 81°29′12″W
- Country: United States
- State: Ohio
- County: Guernsey

Area
  - Total: 25.4 sq mi (65.9 km^{2})
  - Land: 22.6 sq mi (58.5 km^{2})
  - Water: 2.9 sq mi (7.5 km^{2})
- Elevation: 994 ft (303 m)

Population (2020)
  - Total: 97
  - Density: 4.3/sq mi (1.7/km^{2})
- Time zone: UTC-5 (Eastern (EST))
  - Summer (DST): UTC-4 (EDT)
- FIPS code: 39-38640
- GNIS feature ID: 1086181

Jefferson Township is one of the nineteen townships of Guernsey County, Ohio, United States. With a population of 97 at the 2020 census, it is the least populous township in Guernsey County, and the second least populous township in Ohio.

== Geography ==
Located in the northern part of the county, it borders the following townships:

- Monroe Township - north
- Washington Township - northeast corner
- Madison Township - east
- Wills Township - southeast
- Center Township - south
- Cambridge Township - southwest
- Liberty Township - west

No municipalities are located in Jefferson Township.

== Name and history ==
Jefferson Township was established in 1816. It is one of twenty-four Jefferson Townships statewide.

== Government ==
The township is governed by a three-member board of trustees, who are elected in November of odd-numbered years to a four-year term beginning on the following January 1. Two are elected in the year after the presidential election and one is elected in the year before it. There is also an elected township fiscal officer, who serves a four-year term beginning on April 1 of the year after the election, which is held in November of the year before the presidential election. Vacancies in the fiscal officership or on the board of trustees are filled by the remaining trustees.
