= Wheeling Township, Guernsey County, Ohio =

Township in Ohio, US

- Township
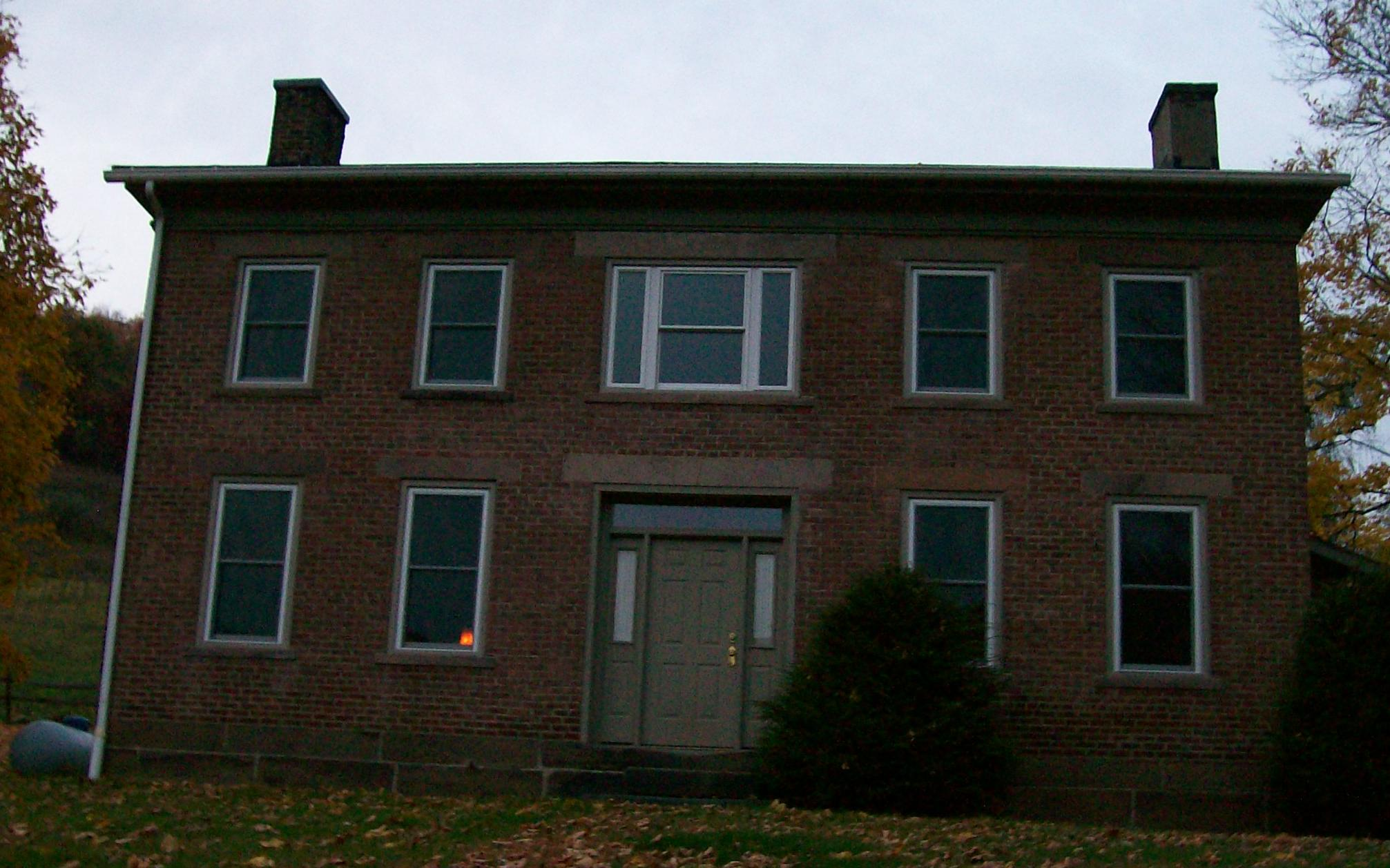
- The Booth Homestead, built 1843

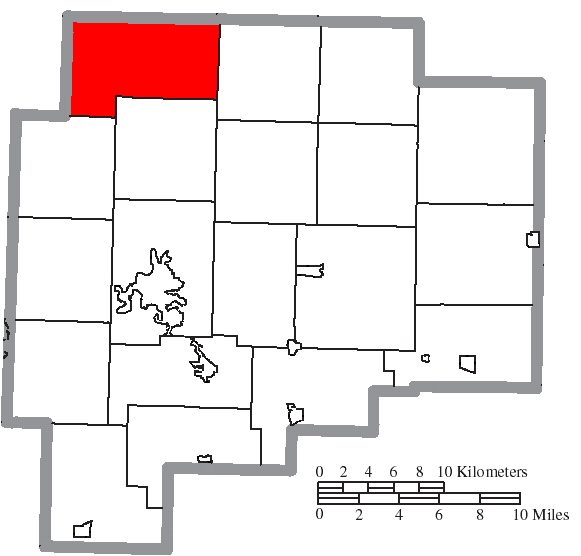
- Location of Wheeling Township in Guernsey County
- Coordinates: 40°11′8″N 81°35′43″W
- Country: United States
- State: Ohio
- County: Guernsey

Area
  - Total: 32.2 sq mi (83.5 km^{2})
  - Land: 32.2 sq mi (83.5 km^{2})
  - Water: 0 sq mi (0.0 km^{2})
- Elevation: 843 ft (257 m)

Population (2020)
  - Total: 680
  - Density: 21/sq mi (8.1/km^{2})
- Time zone: UTC-5 (Eastern (EST))
  - Summer (DST): UTC-4 (EDT)
- FIPS code: 39-84616
- GNIS feature ID: 1086194

Wheeling Township is one of the nineteen townships of Guernsey County, Ohio, United States. As of the 2020 census the population was 680.

== Geography ==
Located in the northwestern corner of the county, it borders the following townships:

- Oxford Township, Tuscarawas County - north
- Washington Township, Tuscarawas County - northeast corner
- Monroe Township - east
- Liberty Township - southeast
- Knox Township - southwest
- Linton Township, Coshocton County - west
- Oxford Township, Coshocton County - northwest

No municipalities are located in Wheeling Township. The unincorporated community of Guernsey is located in the township.

== Name and history ==
Wheeling Township was established in 1810. Statewide, the only other Wheeling Township is located in Belmont County.

== Government ==
The township is governed by a three-member board of trustees, who are elected in November of odd-numbered years to a four-year term beginning on the following January 1. Two are elected in the year after the presidential election and one is elected in the year before it. There is also an elected township fiscal officer, who serves a four-year term beginning on April 1 of the year after the election, which is held in November of the year before the presidential election. Vacancies in the fiscal officership or on the board of trustees are filled by the remaining trustees.
