= John Reaves House =

- U.S. National Register of Historic Places
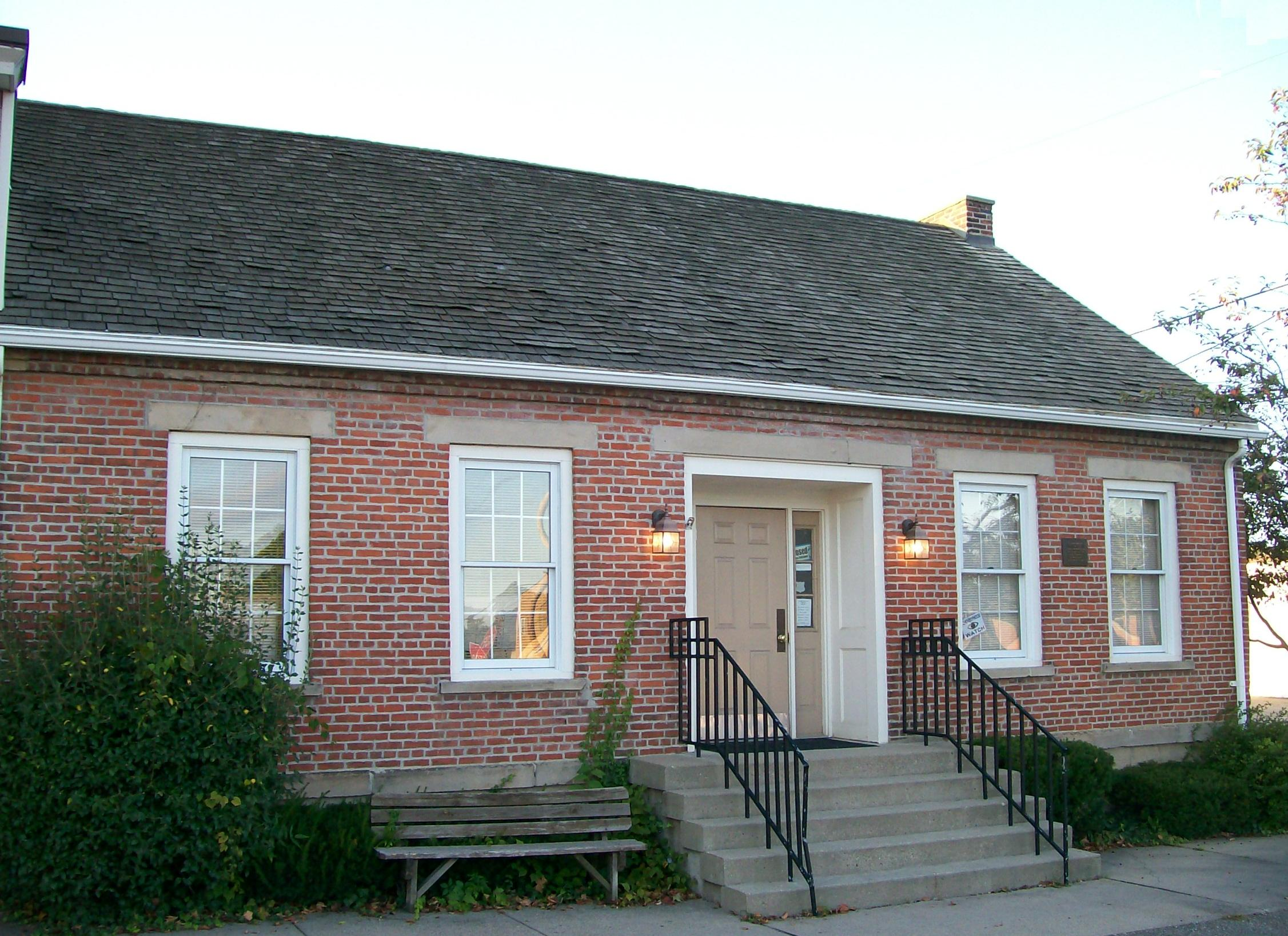
- Front of the house

- Location within Ohio
- Location: Public Sq., Freeport, Ohio
- Coordinates: 40°12′37″N 81°16′1.5″W
- Area: Less than 1 acre (0.40 ha)
- Built: 1820
- NRHP reference No.: 77001068
- Added to NRHP: July 15, 1977

The John Reaves House is a historic residence and government building in the village of Freeport, Ohio, United States. Constructed by one of the area's earliest settlers, it was later home to one of Freeport's most significant citizens. After years of use as a house, it was converted into non-residential purposes, and it has been named a historic site.

Daniel Easley settled at the site of Freeport circa 1804 after migrating from Virginia. The date at which he built the house is unknown, although it was certainly no later than 1820. Later in life, Easley journeyed farther west and established the city of Freeport in Stephenson County, Illinois. Before leaving, he sold his home to the family of John Reaves, who gained a posthumous reputation as one of the village's significant early residents. As a civilian, he was among Harrison County's earliest teachers, and villagers honored him as the first Harrison County resident to die in the war of the rebellion; he was even the first man in the village to enlist after the fall of Fort Sumter. Reaves' home is a small brick building with a central entrance on the facade, as well as a subsidiary side door. The building is one and one-half stories tall, resting on a stone foundation, with walls that rise to side-facing gables topped with chimneys. Following Reaves' death, the house was converted into a commercial building; by 1888, it had become home to Freeport's first bank. In later years, it was later given to village officials, who employed it as the village hall and as a museum. It has since become a library, the Clark Memorial branch of the Cadiz-based Puskarich Public Library.

The house was added to the National Register of Historic Places in mid-1977, qualifying because of its historically significant architecture; the oldest surviving building in Freeport, it has experienced very few changes since its construction.
