= Stillwater, Ohio =

Unincorporated community in Ohio, U.S.

Coordinates: 40°19′24″N 81°18′30″W

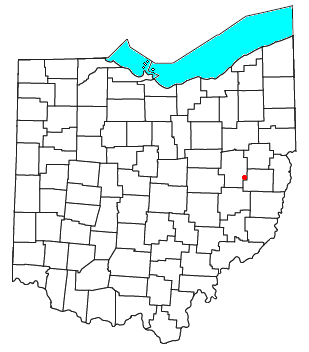
Location of Stillwater, Ohio

Stillwater is an unincorporated community in eastern Rush Township, Tuscarawas County, Ohio, United States. It has a post office with the ZIP code 44679. It lies at the intersection of State Routes 258 and 800.

== History ==
Stillwater was originally called Lima. A post office called Stillwater has been in operation since 1837.
