= Guernsey, Ohio =

Unincorporated community in Ohio, U.S.

Coordinates: 40°10′54″N 81°35′32″W

Guernsey is an unincorporated community in Wheeling Township, Guernsey County, in the U.S. state of Ohio.

== History ==
A post office called Wheeling was established in 1874, and the name was changed to Guernsey in 1881. The community's present name is derived from its location within Guernsey County.

== Geography ==
Guernsey is located northeast of the confluence of Birds Run with Johnsons Fork. The community's historic center is where the old post office/general store was located on Guernsey Valley Road (County Route 86) east of the bridge over Birds Run, north of the 8th Street Road (County Route 33) bridge over Johnsons Fork, near where northbound CR-33 turns west (to run concurrently with CR-86) before turning north on the continuation of 8th Street Road (CR-33).
