= Rush Township, Tuscarawas County, Ohio =

Township in Ohio, US

- Township
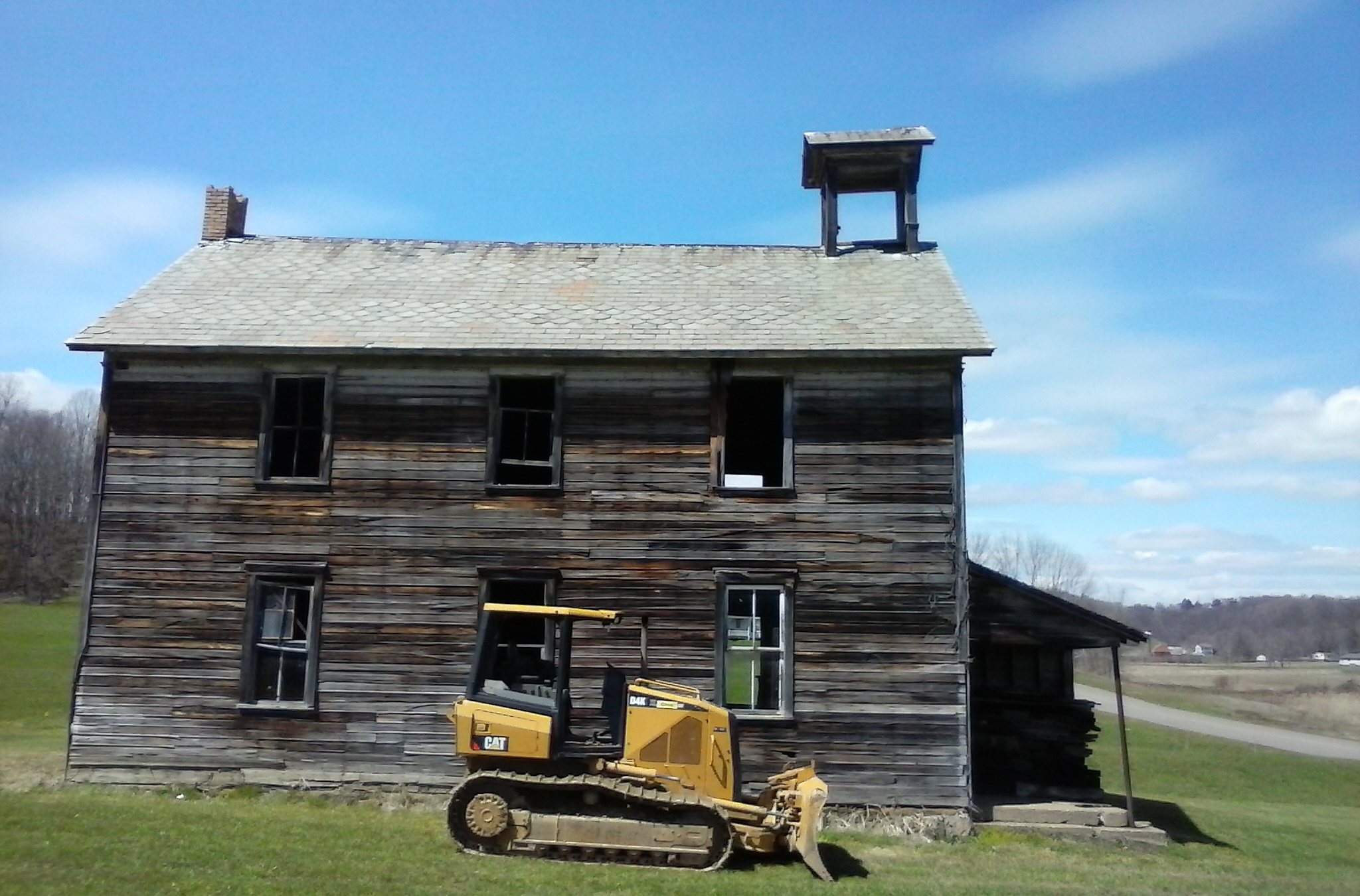
- Schoolhouse on Edie Hill Road

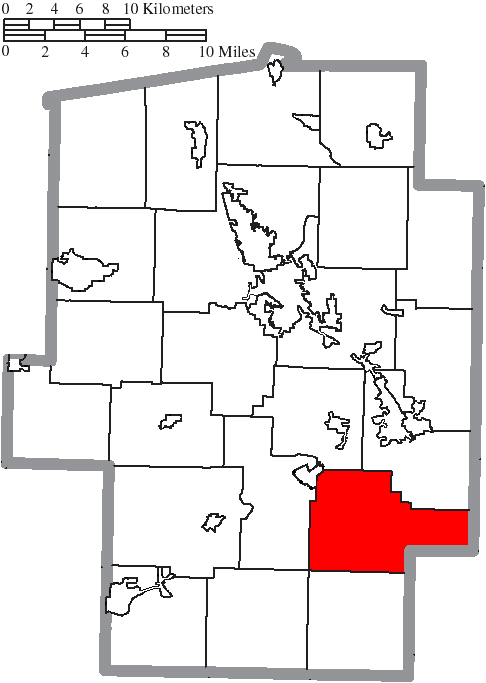
- Location of Rush Township in Tuscarawas County
- Coordinates: 40°19′35″N 81°20′33″W
- Country: United States
- State: Ohio
- County: Tuscarawas

Area
  - Total: 29.7 sq mi (77.0 km^{2})
  - Land: 29.7 sq mi (76.9 km^{2})
  - Water: 0 sq mi (0.0 km^{2})
- Elevation: 1,184 ft (361 m)

Population (2020)
  - Total: 867
  - Density: 29/sq mi (11.3/km^{2})
- Time zone: UTC-5 (Eastern (EST))
  - Summer (DST): UTC-4 (EDT)
- ZIP code: 44683
- Area code: 740
- FIPS code: 39-69106
- GNIS feature ID: 1087063

Rush Township is one of the twenty-two townships of Tuscarawas County, Ohio, United States. The 2020 census found 867 people in the township.

== Geography ==
Located in the southeastern part of the county, it borders the following townships:

- Mill Township - north
- Franklin Township, Harrison County - east
- Washington Township, Harrison County - southeast
- Perry Township - south
- Washington Township - southwest corner
- Clay Township - west
- Warwick Township - northwest

Part of the village of Gnadenhutten is located in northwestern Rush Township, and the unincorporated community of Stillwater lies in the eastern part of the township.

== Name and history ==
Statewide, other Rush Townships are located in Champaign and Scioto counties.

== Government ==
The township is governed by a three-member board of trustees, who are elected in November of odd-numbered years to a four-year term beginning on the following January 1. Two are elected in the year after the presidential election and one is elected in the year before it. There is also an elected township fiscal officer, who serves a four-year term beginning on April 1 of the year after the election, which is held in November of the year before the presidential election. Vacancies in the fiscal officership or on the board of trustees are filled by the remaining trustees.
