= Clendening Lake =

Reservoir in Harrison County, Ohio, US

- Location within Ohio Location within the United States
- Location: Harrison County, Ohio
- Coordinates: 40°16′7″N 81°16′36″W reservoir; 40°16′17″N 81°16′36″W dam
- Type: reservoir
- Primary inflows: Brushy Fork - source 40°15′1″N 81°1′28″W
- Primary outflows: Brushy Fork - mouth 40°16′1″N 81°17′4″W, Elevation: 860 feet (260 m)
- Basin countries: United States
- Max. length: 10 miles (16 km)
- Surface area: 1,800 acres (7.3 km^{2})
- Shore length^{1}: 43 miles (69 km)
- Surface elevation: 898 feet (274 m)
- ^{1} Shore length is not a well-defined measure.

Clendening Lake is a reservoir located in Harrison County, Ohio, in the United States, formed by damming Brushy Fork, 0.5 miles (0.80 km) East of Tippecanoe.

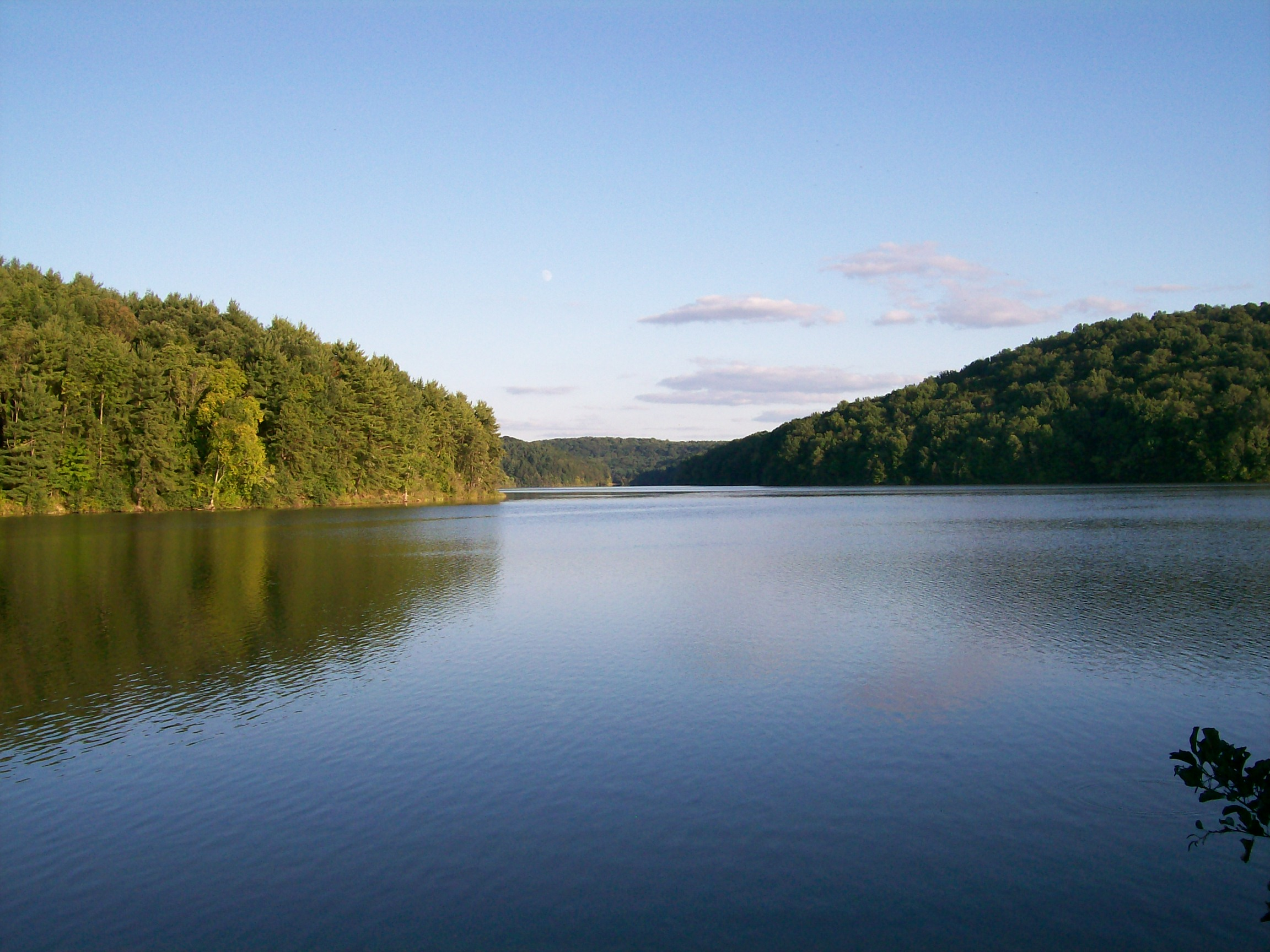
Clendening Lake in September 2009

It is part of the Muskingum Watershed Conservancy District, which was created in 1933 to control flooding in the state of Ohio, primarily due to the Great Flood of 1913. It is known as the largest undeveloped lake in the state of Ohio, yet has on its shores: Boy Scout Summer Camp Fort Steuben Scout Reservation Clendening Marina in Freeport, Ohio and the YMCA's Camp Tippecanoe near the town of Tippecanoe, Ohio, along with a campground, playground, and picnic area. Locals to the area have said that there are still buildings under the lake's waters from a former community that existed prior to the area's flooding to create the lake. The Ohio state record flathead catfish was caught in Clending Lake on July 28, 1979. It weighed 76.5 pounds and was 58 5/8″ in length.

== Clendening Dam ==
Clendening dam is 750 feet (230 m) long, located 0.6 miles (0.97 km) East of the community of Tippecanoe with a normal water pool level of 898 feet (274 m) above sea level.
