= Washington Township, Tuscarawas County, Ohio =

Township in Ohio, US

- Township
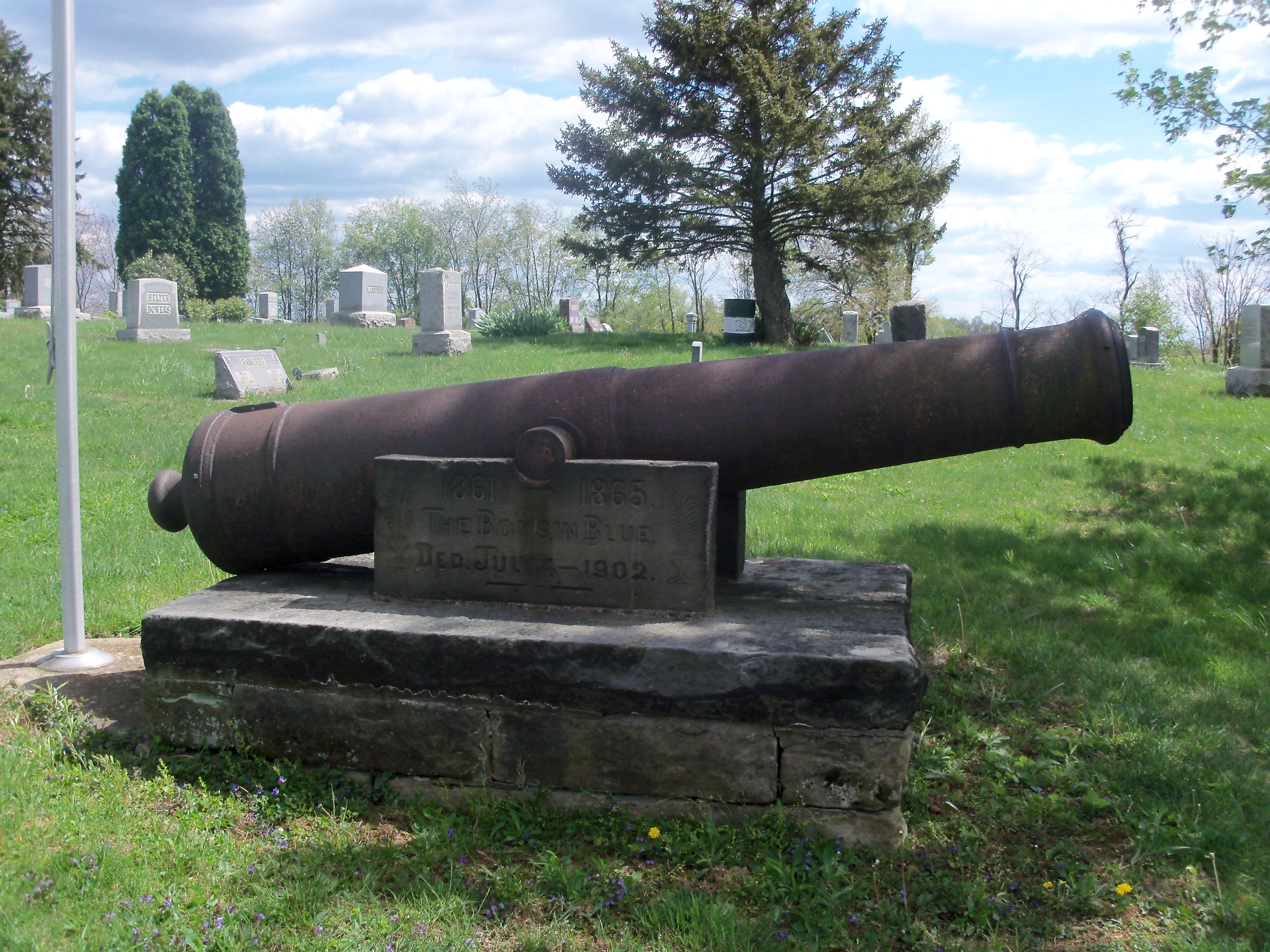
- Civil War memorial near Gilmore

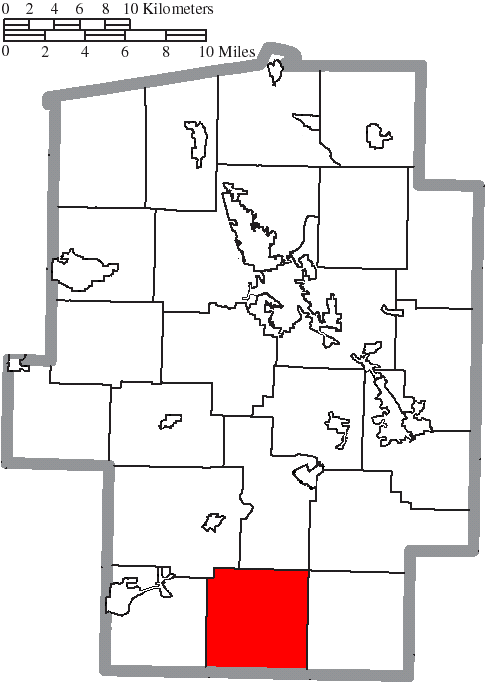
- Location of Washington Township in Tuscarawas County
- Coordinates: 40°15′31″N 81°29′8″W
- Country: United States
- State: Ohio
- County: Tuscarawas

Area
  - Total: 25.7 sq mi (66.5 km^{2})
  - Land: 25.7 sq mi (66.5 km^{2})
  - Water: 0 sq mi (0.0 km^{2})
- Elevation: 846 ft (258 m)

Population (2020)
  - Total: 739
  - Density: 28.8/sq mi (11.1/km^{2})
- Time zone: UTC-5 (Eastern (EST))
  - Summer (DST): UTC-4 (EDT)
- FIPS code: 39-81648
- GNIS feature ID: 1087070

Washington Township is one of the twenty-two townships of Tuscarawas County, Ohio, United States. The 2020 census found 739 people in the township.

== Geography ==
Located in the southern part of the county, it borders the following townships:

- Clay Township – north
- Rush Township – northeast corner
- Perry Township – east
- Monroe Township, Guernsey County – south
- Wheeling Township, Guernsey County – southwest corner
- Oxford Township – west
- Salem Township – northwest

No municipalities are located in Washington Township.

== Name and history ==
It is one of forty-three Washington Townships statewide.

Washington Township was organized in 1827.

== Government ==
The township is governed by a three-member board of trustees, who are elected in November of odd-numbered years to a four-year term beginning on the following January 1. Two are elected in the year after the presidential election and one is elected in the year before it. There is also an elected township fiscal officer, who serves a four-year term beginning on April 1 of the year after the election, which is held in November of the year before the presidential election. Vacancies in the fiscal officership or on the board of trustees are filled by the remaining trustees.
