= Perry Township, Tuscarawas County, Ohio =

Township in Ohio, US

- Township
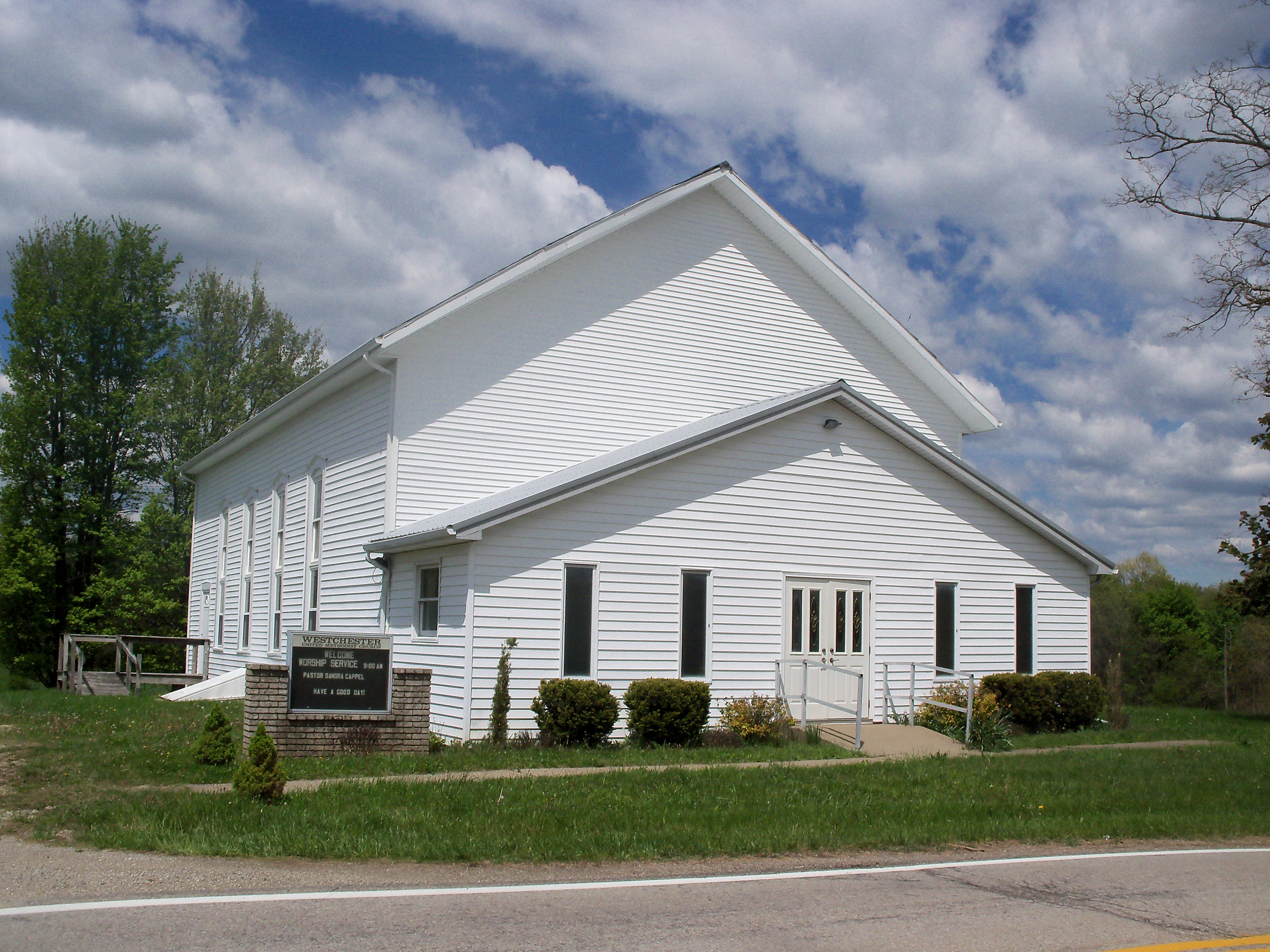
- United Methodist Church in West Chester

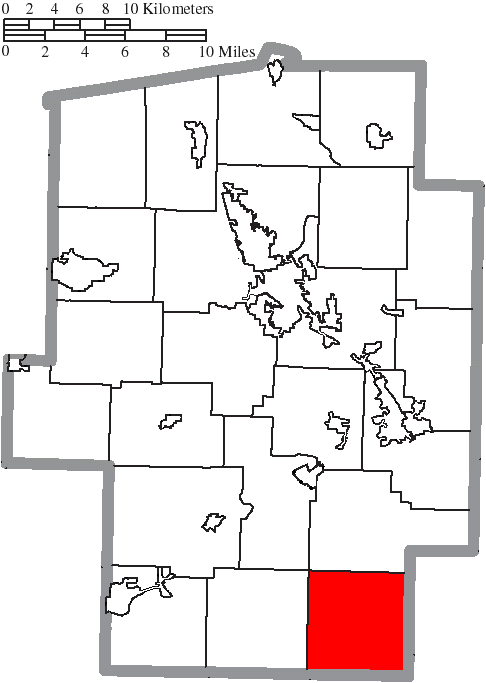
- Location of Perry Township in Tuscarawas County
- Coordinates: 40°14′35″N 81°22′31″W
- Country: United States
- State: Ohio
- County: Tuscarawas

Area
  - Total: 25.8 sq mi (66.7 km^{2})
  - Land: 25.7 sq mi (66.6 km^{2})
  - Water: 0 sq mi (0.0 km^{2})
- Elevation: 1,217 ft (371 m)

Population (2020)
  - Total: 439
  - Density: 17/sq mi (6.6/km^{2})
- Time zone: UTC-5 (Eastern (EST))
  - Summer (DST): UTC-4 (EDT)
- FIPS code: 39-62092
- GNIS feature ID: 1087062

Perry Township is one of the twenty-two townships of Tuscarawas County, Ohio, United States. The 2020 census found 439 people in the township.

== Geography ==
Located in the southeastern corner of the county, it borders the following townships:

- Rush Township - north
- Washington Township, Harrison County - northeast
- Freeport Township, Harrison County - southeast
- Washington Township, Guernsey County - south
- Monroe Township, Guernsey County - southwest
- Washington Township - west
- Clay Township - northwest corner

No municipalities are located in Perry Township.

== Name and history ==
It is one of twenty-six Perry Townships statewide.

== Government ==
The township is governed by a three-member board of trustees, who are elected in November of odd-numbered years to a four-year term beginning on the following January 1. Two are elected in the year after the presidential election and one is elected in the year before it. There is also an elected township fiscal officer, who serves a four-year term beginning on April 1 of the year after the election, which is held in November of the year before the presidential election. Vacancies in the fiscal officership or on the board of trustees are filled by the remaining trustees.
