= Freeport, Ohio =

- Village
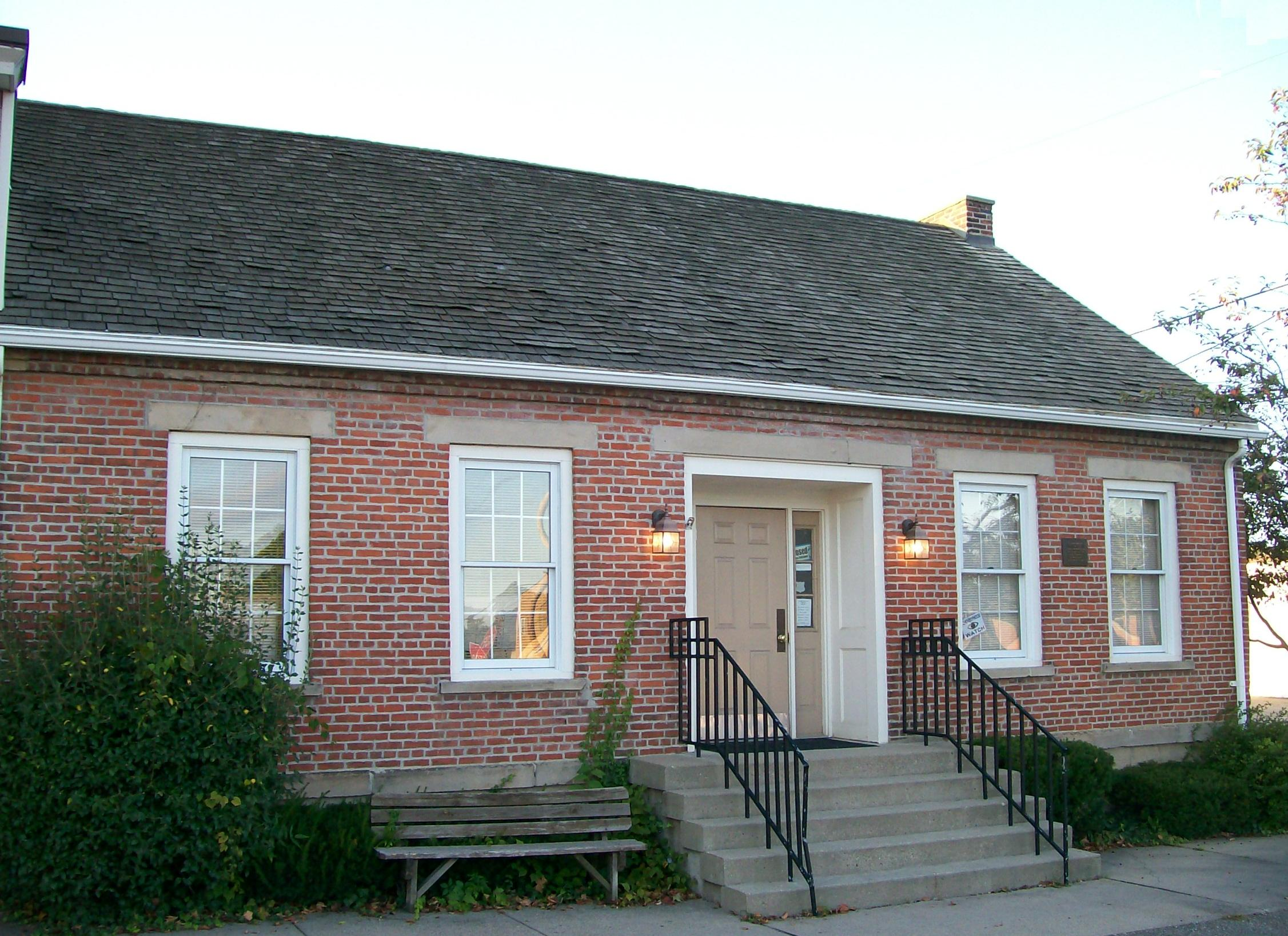
- The John Reaves House in Freeport is listed on the National Register of Historic Places

- Location within Ohio Location within the United States
- Coordinates: 40°12′40″N 81°16′07″W
- Country: United States
- State: Ohio
- County: Harrison
- Township: Freeport
- Platted: 1810

Area
  - Total: 0.60 sq mi (1.55 km^{2})
  - Land: 0.60 sq mi (1.55 km^{2})
  - Water: 0 sq mi (0.00 km^{2})
- Elevation: 1,017 ft (310 m)

Population (2020)
  - Total: 321
  - Estimate (2023): 315
  - Density: 535.9/sq mi (206.92/km^{2})
- Time zone: UTC-5 (Eastern (EST))
  - Summer (DST): UTC-4 (EDT)
- ZIP code: 43973
- Area code: 740
- FIPS code: 39-28798
- GNIS feature ID: 2398926

Freeport is also the former name of the Warren County town of Oregonia.

Freeport is a village in Freeport Township, Harrison County, Ohio, United States. The population was 321 at the 2020 census.

== History ==
Freeport was laid out in 1810. A post office has been in operation at Freeport since 1814.

== Geography ==
According to the United States Census Bureau, the village has a total area of 0.60 square miles (1.55 km^{2}), all land.

== Demographics ==
Historical population
Census	Pop.	Note	%±
1830	211		—
1850	288		—
1880	387		—
1890	672		73.6%
1900	690		2.7%
1910	624		−9.6%
1920	626		0.3%
1930	578		−7.7%
1940	562		−2.8%
1950	566		0.7%
1960	503		−11.1%
1970	490		−2.6%
1980	525		7.1%
1990	475		−9.5%
2000	398		−16.2%
2010	369		−7.3%
2020	321		−13.0%
2023 (est.)	315	▼	−1.9%
U.S. Decennial Census

=== 2010 census ===
As of the census of 2010, there were 369 people, 161 households, and 87 families living in the village. The population density was 615.0 inhabitants per square mile (237.5/km^{2}). There were 181 housing units at an average density of 301.7 per square mile (116.5/km^{2}). The racial makeup of the village was 97.6% White and 2.4% from two or more races.

There were 161 households, of which 28.0% had children under the age of 18 living with them, 41.6% were married couples living together, 5.6% had a female householder with no husband present, 6.8% had a male householder with no wife present, and 46.0% were non-families. 39.1% of all households were made up of individuals, and 15.5% had someone living alone who was 65 years of age or older. The average household size was 2.29 and the average family size was 3.16.

The median age in the village was 41.2 years. 23.3% of residents were under the age of 18; 5.5% were between the ages of 18 and 24; 26.3% were from 25 to 44; 27% were from 45 to 64; and 17.9% were 65 years of age or older. The gender makeup of the village was 49.9% male and 50.1% female.

=== 2000 census ===
As of the census of 2000, there were 398 people, 170 households, and 99 families living in the village. The population density was 664.5 inhabitants per square mile (256.6/km^{2}). There were 200 housing units at an average density of 333.9 per square mile (128.9/km^{2}). The racial makeup of the village was 98.49% White, 0.50% Native American, 0.25% Asian, and 0.75% from two or more races.

There were 170 households, out of which 27.6% had children under the age of 18 living with them, 47.1% were married couples living together, 9.4% had a female householder with no husband present, and 41.2% were non-families. 35.9% of all households were made up of individuals, and 22.4% had someone living alone who was 65 years of age or older. The average household size was 2.34 and the average family size was 3.12.

In the village, the population was spread out, with 22.6% under the age of 18, 10.3% from 18 to 24, 27.9% from 25 to 44, 22.1% from 45 to 64, and 17.1% who were 65 years of age or older. The median age was 39 years. For every 100 females there were 85.1 males. For every 100 females age 18 and over, there were 80.1 males.

The median income for a household in the village was $18,558, and the median income for a family was $35,833. Males had a median income of $26,667 versus $14,000 for females. The per capita income for the village was $15,877. About 11.5% of families and 19.4% of the population were below the poverty line, including 23.6% of those under age 18 and 12.9% of those age 65 or over.

== Arts and culture ==
Freeport has a public library, a branch of the Puskarich Public Library.

== Education ==
The village is served by Lakeland Academy, a K-12 public school.
