= List of former state routes in Ohio (569–673) =

This is a list of former state routes in Ohio since 1923 with route numbers from 569 through 673 inclusive.

== SR 569 ==
State Route 569
- Location: Jefferson Township–Madison Township
- Existed: 1938–1955

SR 569 was a state route in Williams County connecting US 127 in Jefferson Township to US 20 in Madison Township. In the community of Kunkle, SR 569 intersected a now-defunct segment of SR 246. The route existed from 1938 until 1955 when the entire road became a part of Williams County Road 13.

Browse numbered routes
← SR 568	OH	→ SR 570

== SR 570 ==
State Route 570
- Location: Providence Township–Waterville Township
- Existed: 1937–1961

SR 570 was a state-maintained section of Neowash Road in southern Lucas County. The four-mile-long (6.4 km) route connected SR 295 in Providence Township and US 24 southwest of Waterville. The route existed from 1937 until 1961. Today, Neowash Road is signed as Lucas County Road 143.

Browse numbered routes
← SR 569	OH	→ SR 571

== SR 571 (1937–1955) ==
State Route 571
- Location: Bridgewater Township
- Existed: 1937–1955

SR 571 was a former state route in Bridgewater Township, Williams County connecting US 20 and the Michigan state line. The four-mile-long (6.4 km) route existed from 1937 until 1955. The road itself is still a state highway as SR 576 was signed on the entire route after being extended from Montpelier.

== SR 572 ==
State Route 572
- Location: Bailey–Sylvania Township
- Existed: 1937–1945

SR 572 was a state route in Lucas County. When it was created in 1937, the route extended from SR 570 near Bailey and ended at US 20 (Central Avenue) near Silica. SR 572 used Hertzfeld Road, heading north to Neapolis-Waterville Road, jogging east to join Finzel Road. SR 572 then traveled north along Finzel Road to Weckerly Road, then north on Weckerly to Maumee-Western Road (US 20A). After jogging east, it used Crissey Road north to its northern terminus at US 20. By 1939, the route was slightly extended at both ends: It was extended on the southern end through Bailey to end at US 24 and was extended to SR 568 (Sylvania-Metamora Road) at its northern end by way of Herr Road, Sylvania Avenue and Mitchaw Road. The route would follow this route until it was deleted in 1945.

Browse numbered routes
← SR 571	OH	→ SR 573

== SR 573 ==
State Route 573
- Location: Tiffin Township–Adams Township
- Existed: 1939–1945

SR 573 was the designation for Mekus Road in northeastern Defiance County from 1939 until 1945. Throughout its history, the entire four-mile-long (6.4 km) route was gravel-paved. The route connected SR 66 with SR 580 north of Defiance. Today, all of Mekus Road is a part of Defiance County Road 81.

Browse numbered routes
← SR 572	OH	→ SR 574

== SR 577 ==
State Route 577
- Location: Waterville–Toledo
- Existed: 1939–1951

SR 577 was the designation for a state route in the Toledo area. The route was first created in 1939, started in downtown Toledo, and traveled northeast along the banks of the Maumee River on Summit Street before turning north at the edge of the Maumee Bay. The route ended at the Michigan state line in Washington Township. In 1942, the route was extended south to Maumee along Summit Street, Broadway and River Road, roads that followed the course of the Maumee River, but not directly next to the river (US 24 followed the road next to the river). By 1946, the section of SR 577 north of downtown Toledo was deleted from the state highway system but was extended further south to SR 64 in Waterville. The route last appeared on official Ohio highway maps in 1951.

Browse numbered routes
← SR 576	OH	→ SR 578

== SR 578 ==
State Route 578
- Location: Grand Rapids–Providence Township
- Length: 0.19 mi (310 m)
- Existed: 1937–2012

SR 578 was a short 0.19-mile-long (310 m) state highway connecting SR 65 in Grand Rapids to US 24 in Providence Township via a bridge over the Maumee River. When the route was created in 1937, SR 578 started at SR 33 (now SR 108) south of Napoleon and traveled east through Malinta before turning north to end at US 24 in Grand Rapids. At the time, US 24 crossed to the north side of the Maumee River at the Grand Rapids bridge. By 1942, SR 578 was extended across the river when US 24 was routed on the north side of the river for its entire length. However, by 1945, the entire route only consisted of the bridge and its approaches, the alignment it would use for nearly the next seven decades. In 2012, as a part of the construction of the US 24 freeway in the area, SR 295 was extended from its old southern terminus along the former US 24 to Grand Rapids, taking over all of SR 578. The SR 578 designation was deleted as a result.

== SR 580 ==
State Route 580
- Location: Richland Township–Ridgeville Corners
- Existed: 1939–1957

SR 580 was a state highway in Defiance County with a short portion in northwestern Henry County that existed from 1939 until 1957. The route started in the Richland Township community of Independence near the banks of the Maumee River at US 24 to US 6 in Ridgeville Corners. The entire length of the route was paved by 1949.

Browse numbered routes
← SR 579	OH	→ SR 581

== SR 581 ==
State Route 581
- Location: Toledo–Bono
- Existed: 1937–1939

SR 581 was a 15-mile-long (24 km) state highway in the eastern portion of Lucas County. The route began at the intersection of Summit Street (SR 577) and Ash Street in Toledo and immediately crossed the Maumee River on the Ash-Consaul Bridge. After crossing the bridge, the route headed east along Consaul Street which turned into Corduroy Road upon leaving Toledo city limits (now a part of the city of Oregon). Near the communities of Reno Beach and Lakeland, SR 581 made a right turn onto Howard Road to end at SR 2 near Bono. The route existed from 1937 until 1939.

Browse numbered routes
← SR 580	OH	→ SR 582

== SR 584 ==
State Route 584
- Location: Salem Township–Bay Township
- Existed: 1937–1957

SR 584 was a short state route in southern Ottawa County. Starting at SR 19 in Salem Township, south of Oak Harbor and the Portage River, the route traveled east along West Oak Harbor-Southeast Road for about eight miles (13 km) before ending at SR 53 in Bay Township at the Sandusky Bay. The route existed from 1937 until 1957. The former route is now a part of Ottawa County Road 17.

Browse numbered routes
← SR 582	OH	→ SR 585

== SR 585 (1937–1939) ==
State Route 585
- Location: Kipton–Oberlin
- Existed: 1937–1939

SR 585 was the designation for the road that currently carries US 20 from the community of Kipton to east of Oberlin. SR 585 started at the intersection of US 20 and what was then the northern terminus of SR 511; it traveled west-northwest until it intersected US 20 again while it was concurrent with SR 10. Created in 1937, it existed for about two years until it was fully replaced by US 20; SR 10 was then extended over the former routing of US 20 through Kipton and Oberlin.

== SR 591 ==
State Route 591
- Location: Springville–Tiffin
- Existed: 1937–1955

SR 591 was a state highway in southwestern Seneca County. The route existed from 1937 until 1955 and traveled from Springville at US 23, passed through New Riegel, and ended west of Tiffin at US 224. Today, all of the former route retains its old number as Seneca County Road 591.

Browse numbered routes
← SR 590	OH	→ SR 591

== SR 592 ==
State Route 592
- Location: Jackson Township
- Length: 10.39 mi (16.72 km)
- Existed: 1937–1955

SR 592 was a state route in western Seneca County near Fostoria. The route started at SR 12 and SR 113 in Jackson Township and traveled due east for about ten miles (16 km) where it ended at SR 53 in Jackson Township. SR 592 served the community of Cromers. The route existed from 1937 until 1955. All of the former route and portions of the east-west road west of SR 12 / SR 113 is known as Seneca County Road 592.

Browse numbered routes
← SR 591	OH	→ SR 595

== SR 596 ==
State Route 596
- Location: Hebron–Edgewater Beach
- Existed: 1937–1958

SR 596 was a state route that ran around the northeastern shore of Buckeye Lake entirely in Licking County. The route it used throughout its history from 1937 until 1958 was from SR 157 southeast of Hebron to SR 13 near Edgewater Beach. When the route was deleted in 1958, around the time part of the route was cut off by the construction of Interstate 70, the jurisdiction of the route was transferred to the county and is today known as Licking County Road 596.

Browse numbered routes
← SR 595	OH	→ SR 598

== SR 607 (1986–2007) ==
State Route 607
- Location: Proctorville
- Length: 0.44 mi (710 m)
- Existed: 1986–2007

SR 607 was a state route in the Proctorville area from 1986 until 2007. The route's southern terminus had always been at the West Virginia state line on the East Huntington Bridge. SR 607 crossed over SR 7 and then looped 180 degrees to end at a T-intersection with SR 7. Around 2005, a road was built stretching north from the northern end of the bridge was built. This new road, which ended 0.55 miles (0.89 km) away from a newly created intersection with SR 607 at Irene Road was designated SR 607-T. In 2007, both sections of SR 607 were deleted and was replaced by an extension of SR 775 except for the ramp from the north-south road to SR 7, the ramp became a part of SR 7 when it was routed on a bypass of Proctorville.

== SR 612 ==
State Route 612
- Location: Strongsville/North Royalton–Cleveland
- Existed: 1937–1951

SR 612 was the designation for a state-maintained section of West 130th Street in Cuyahoga County. The route started at SR 82 (Royalton Road) on the border of Strongsville and North Royalton and traveled due north. SR 612 traveled along the borders of Strongsville, North Royalton, Middleburg Heights, Parma, Parma Heights, and Brook Park. SR 612 reached SR 17 (Brookpark Road) at the city limits of Cleveland. This intersection served as the northern terminus of SR 612 from 1937 until 1939. After 1940, SR 612 continued north into Cleveland for about three miles (4.8 km) to SR 10 (Lorain Avenue). The route was deleted from the state highway system between 1951 and 1953.

== SR 613 (1937–1945) ==
State Route 613
- Location: Glenwillow–Solon
- Existed: 1937–1945

SR 613 was a state route in southeastern Cuyahoga County. The route carried Richmond Road from Broadway Road (at the time also SR 14) to Aurora Road (SR 43) in Glenwillow and Solon. SR 613 existed from 1937 until 1945 when it was replaced by SR 175 though today, the road is not state-maintained at all.

== SR 614 ==
State Route 614
- Location: Concord Township–Madison Township
- Existed: 1937–1942

SR 614 was nine-mile-long (14 km) state route in Lake County. The route started at SR 86 in Concord Township, traveled east, and ended at SR 166 (signed as SR 528 after 1940) in Madison Township. The route was signed from 1937 until after 1942.

Browse numbered routes
← SR 613	OH	→ SR 615

== SR 622 ==
State Route 622
- Location: Poland Township
- Existed: 1937–1941

SR 622 was a state route entirely in Poland Township that existed from 1937 until 1941. The route started at SR 18 (modern-day SR 289) near the city limits of Struthers and traveled east along New Castle Road (currently Mahoning County Road 106) before ending at the Pennsylvania state line, though the road continues in Pennsylvania as Skyhill Road.

Browse numbered routes
← SR 621	OH	→ SR 623

== SR 623 ==
State Route 623
- Location: Alliance
- Existed: 1938–1941

SR 623 was a state route on the Stark–Mahoning County county line in existence from 1938 until 1941. The route also formed the border between the city of Alliance and Smith Township. The short route, also called Mahoning Avenue, connected US 62 (East State Street) with East Patterson Street, which was signed as SR 173 while SR 623 existed.

Browse numbered routes
← SR 622	OH	→ SR 625

== SR 627 (1937–1969) ==
State Route 627
- Location: Deerville–Paris
- Existed: 1937–1969

SR 627 was a north-south state route in Stark County. The southern terminus of SR 627 was located in the community of Deerfield (within Deerfield Township) at SR 14, just north of its intersection with US 224. The route traveled due north through several small communities in eastern Portage County. From 1937 until 1941, SR 627 traveled north through the village of Windham before ending at SR 82 in the community of Mahoning. After 1942, due to the opening of the Ravenna Arsenal, the section of SR 627 north of SR 5 in Paris was removed from the state highway system. The route would remain in existence until after 1969 when it was replaced in its entirety by SR 225.

== SR 628 ==
State Route 628
- Location: North Canton
- Existed: 1937–1967

SR 628 was a short east-west state route connecting SR 8 and SR 43 on East Maple Street in North Canton. From 1937 until 1941, SR 628 extended east from SR 43 along Easton Road (current Stark County Road 86) to end at US 62. For the remainder of the route's history until 1967, the route consisted of the SR 8-SR 43 segment. By 1969, SR 628 was turned over to local control, the same time SR 8 between Canton and Akron was deleted from the state highway system.

Browse numbered routes
← SR 627	OH	→ SR 629

== SR 629 ==
State Route 629
- Location: Jackson Township–Youngstown
- Existed: 1937–1941

SR 629 was an east-west state highway in central Mahoning County. The route started at SR 45 in Jackson Township and traveled east along Kirk Road. After intersecting SR 46, Kirk Road ended at the Austintown Township–Youngstown border, but SR 629 continued south on Tippecanoe Road to end at US 62. The route existed from 1937 until 1941.

Browse numbered routes
← SR 628	OH	→ SR 630

== SR 631 ==
State Route 631
- Location: Valley View–Northfield Center Township
- Existed: 1937–1967

SR 631 was a state route in the vicinity of Northfield that existed from 1937 until 1967. When it was created in 1937, the route ran on Valley View Road from the Cuyahoga/Summit County line on the northern border of Sagamore Hills and traveled southeast through Northfield and Macedonia before ending at SR 91 just north of Hudson. There was a slight realignment at the eastern terminus when the Ohio Turnpike was completed in 1955; the eastern terminus was moved slightly north to avoid crossing over the Turnpike. This would be the route's alignment until about a year before its deletion; SR 631 was truncated to Northfield Center at SR 8 in 1967. Shortly after this, the entire route was deleted from the state highway system.

Browse numbered routes
← SR 630	OH	→ SR 632

== SR 632 ==
State Route 632
- Location: Stow
- Existed: 1937–1966

SR 632 was the state-numbered route for Fishcreek Road in Stow. Throughout its history from 1937 until 1966, SR 632 always started at Kent Road (SR 5, now a part of SR 59) and traveled northwest to SR 91 (Darrow Road). The road is now municipally-maintained.

Browse numbered routes
← SR 631	OH	→ SR 633

== SR 636 ==
State Route 636
- Location: Harrison Township–Tully Township
- Existed: 1937–1942

SR 636 was a ten-mile-long (16 km) state highway in western Van Wert County. The route existed from 1937 until 1942 and ran from US 224 in Harrison Township to US 30 in Tully Township. Today, the former route is carried by numerous county and township roads.

Browse numbered routes
← SR 635	OH	→ SR 637

== SR 655 ==
State Route 655
- Location: Key–Diles Bottom
- Existed: 1939–1967

SR 655 was a seven-mile-long (11 km) state highway entirely in Mead Township, Belmont County. The L-shaped route started at SR 147 in the community of Key and traveled south then east to the community of Diles Bottom on the banks of the Ohio River at SR 7. The route existed from 1939 until 1967 and was replaced by Belmont County Road 54.

Browse numbered routes
← SR 652	OH	→ SR 656

== SR 663 ==
State Route 663
- Location: Somerset–Crooksville
- Existed: 1937–1937

SR 663 was a short-lived state highway from SR 13 east of Somerset to Crooksville at SR 75 (now SR 93). The route only existed in 1937 having been created on a local road from SR 13 to Saltillo and then taking over a portion of SR 345 to Crooksville. In the next year, the entire route merged with SR 669, the number the road continues to carry today.

Browse numbered routes
← SR 662	OH	→ SR 664

== SR 670 (1937–1973) ==
State Route 670
- Location: Senecaville Lake–Salesville
- Existed: 1937–1973

SR 670 was a state route connecting SR 147 near the Senecaville Lake to SR 265 in Salesville. When the route was created in 1937, the route was much straighter than the roads the route would follow later. In 1942, SR 670 was slightly rerouted at its southern end at a point closer to Batesville along SR 147; the route also closely followed the northern shoreline of the lake to Kennonsburg. This alignment would be SR 670's route until 1973. In that year, I-670 was designated in Columbus and due to ODOT not repeating route numbers throughout the state, the route south of SR 313's eastern terminus became an extension of SR 313 and the remainder of the route became SR 761.

Browse numbered routes
← I-670	OH	→ SR 671

== SR 673 ==
State Route 673
- Location: Blue Rock–Cumberland
- Existed: 1937–1937

SR 673 was a state route that connected Blue Rock, Muskingum County and Cumberland, Guernsey County and existed only in 1937. The route started at SR 77 (now SR 60 at the Muskingum River and traveled northeast through Ruraldale intersecting the northern terminus of SR 376 and SR 284 in Zeno before ending at SR 146 in Spencer Township. After one year, the entire route became a part of SR 340; prior to this, SR 340 only ran from Cumberland to Coal Ridge.

Browse numbered routes
← SR 672	OH	→ SR 674
