= Ohio State Route 313 =

State highway in southeastern Ohio, US

State Route 313

Route information
- Maintained by ODOT
- Length: 34.38 mi (55.33 km)
- Existed: 1932–present

Major junctions
- West end: SR 146 near Cumberland
- I-77 near Pleasant City
- East end: SR 147 near Batesville

Location
- Country: United States
- State: Ohio
- Counties: Guernsey, Muskingum, Noble

Highway system
- Ohio State Highway System; Interstate; US; State; Scenic
← SR 312	→ SR 314

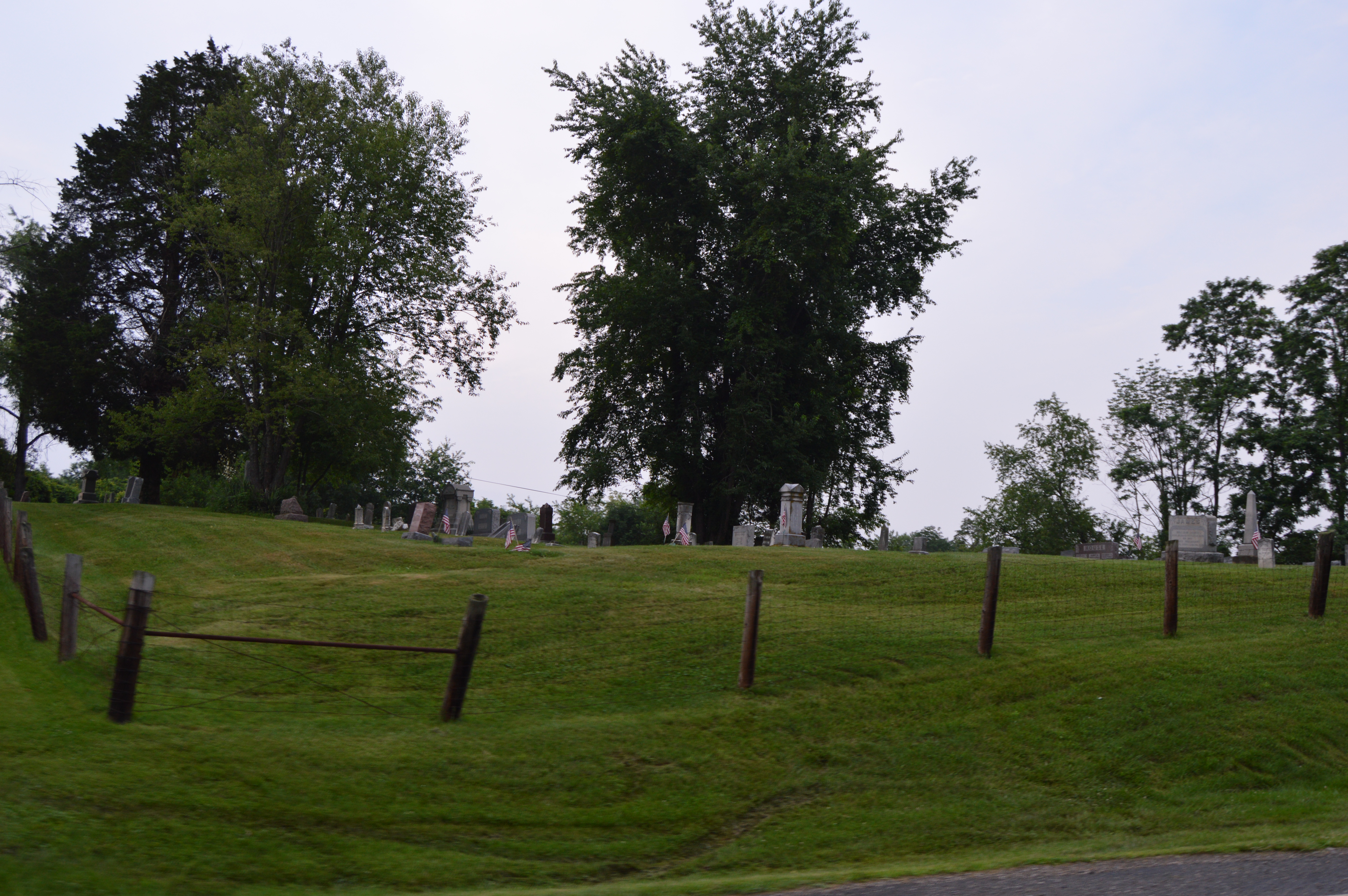
Cemetery at Kennonsburg.

State Route 313 (SR 313, OH 313) is a 34.38-mile (55.33 km) long east–west state highway located in the southeastern portion of the U.S. state of Ohio. The western terminus of SR 313 is at a T-intersection with SR 146 approximately 9.50 miles (15.29 km) northwest of the village of Cumberland. Its eastern terminus is near the eastern end of Senecaville Lake at a T-intersection with SR 147 nearly 3.50 miles (5.63 km) southwest of Batesville.

== Route description ==
Along its path, SR 313 travels through eastern Muskingum County, southern Guernsey County and northeastern Noble County. No segment of SR 313 is included as a portion of the National Highway System.

== History ==
The SR 313 designation was applied in 1932. When it was established, SR 313 existed only along the current alignment of the highway between its eastern junction with SR 83, at the time known as SR 76, southeast of New Concord and its intersection with SR 821, then a portion of US 21, north of Pleasant City.

In 1935, SR 313 was extended east to a new terminus at SR 285 in Senecaville. Two years later, the highway was extended on the west end to its current western terminus at SR 146. SR 313 would be extended on the east end again in 1947. This extension followed the present alignment of the route along the north side of Senecaville Lake to a new eastern terminus at what is now the intersection that marks the southern terminus of SR 761. Then, it was designated as SR 670, which utilized the current easternmost stretch of SR 313 and the entirety of SR 761. It would be until 1974 before SR 313 took on the shape it has today when the SR 670 designation was removed from the state highway system due to the construction of Interstate 670 (I-670) in Columbus. Consequently, SR 313 was extended to its present eastern terminus at SR 147 over the previous southern stretch of SR 670, while the remainder of the former SR 670 north of SR 313 became SR 761.

== Major intersections ==
County	Location	mi	km	Destinations	Notes
Muskingum	Salt Creek Township	0.00	0.00	SR 146 (Chandlersville Road)	
Guernsey	Westland Township	8.37	13.47	SR 83 north	Western end of SR 83 concurrency
Guernsey	Westland Township	9.37	15.08	SR 83 south	Eastern end of SR 83 concurrency
Guernsey	Westland Township	10.54	16.96	SR 660 east / Hendershot Road	Western terminus of SR 660
Guernsey	Valley Township	17.05	27.44	SR 821 (Marietta Road) – Byesville, Pleasant City	
Guernsey	Valley Township	18.30	29.45	I-77 – Marietta, Cleveland	Exit 37 (I-77)
Guernsey	Senecaville	22.16	35.66	SR 285 – Sarahsville, Lore City	
Guernsey	Richland Township	23.54	37.88	SR 574 south – Senecaville Dam	Northern terminus of SR 574
Noble	Wayne Township	30.17	48.55	SR 761 north – Salesville	Southern terminus of SR 761
Noble	Beaver Township	34.38	55.33	SR 147 – Barnesville, Sarahsville	
1.000 mi = 1.609 km; 1.000 km = 0.621 mi: Concurrency terminus
