= Ohio State Route 821 =

State highway in southeastern Ohio, US

State Route 821

Route information
- Maintained by ODOT
- Length: 48.85 mi (78.62 km)
- Existed: 1971–present

Major junctions
- South end: SR 60 near Marietta
- I-77 near Marietta; I-77 in Belle Valley
- North end: I-77 / SR 209 / CR 35 in Byesville

Location
- Country: United States
- State: Ohio
- Counties: Washington, Noble, Guernsey

Highway system
- Ohio State Highway System; Interstate; US; State; Scenic
← SR 814	→ SR 822

State Route 821 (SR 821) is a north–south state highway in the southeastern portion of the U.S. state of Ohio. A state-maintained section of the old US 21, its southern terminus is at SR 60 approximately 2 miles (3.2 km) north of Marietta, and its northern terminus is at I-77 in Byesville, along with the eastern terminus of SR 209. The route is entirely undivided surface road, and is much less direct than the newer I-77 which supplanted it as a through route. As the interstate was being built, the designation of US 21 was moved to the freeway before Ohio wholly decommissioned the now-superfluous U.S. route. SR 821 was designated about two years after US 21 was moved onto I-77 in southeastern Ohio.

== Route description ==
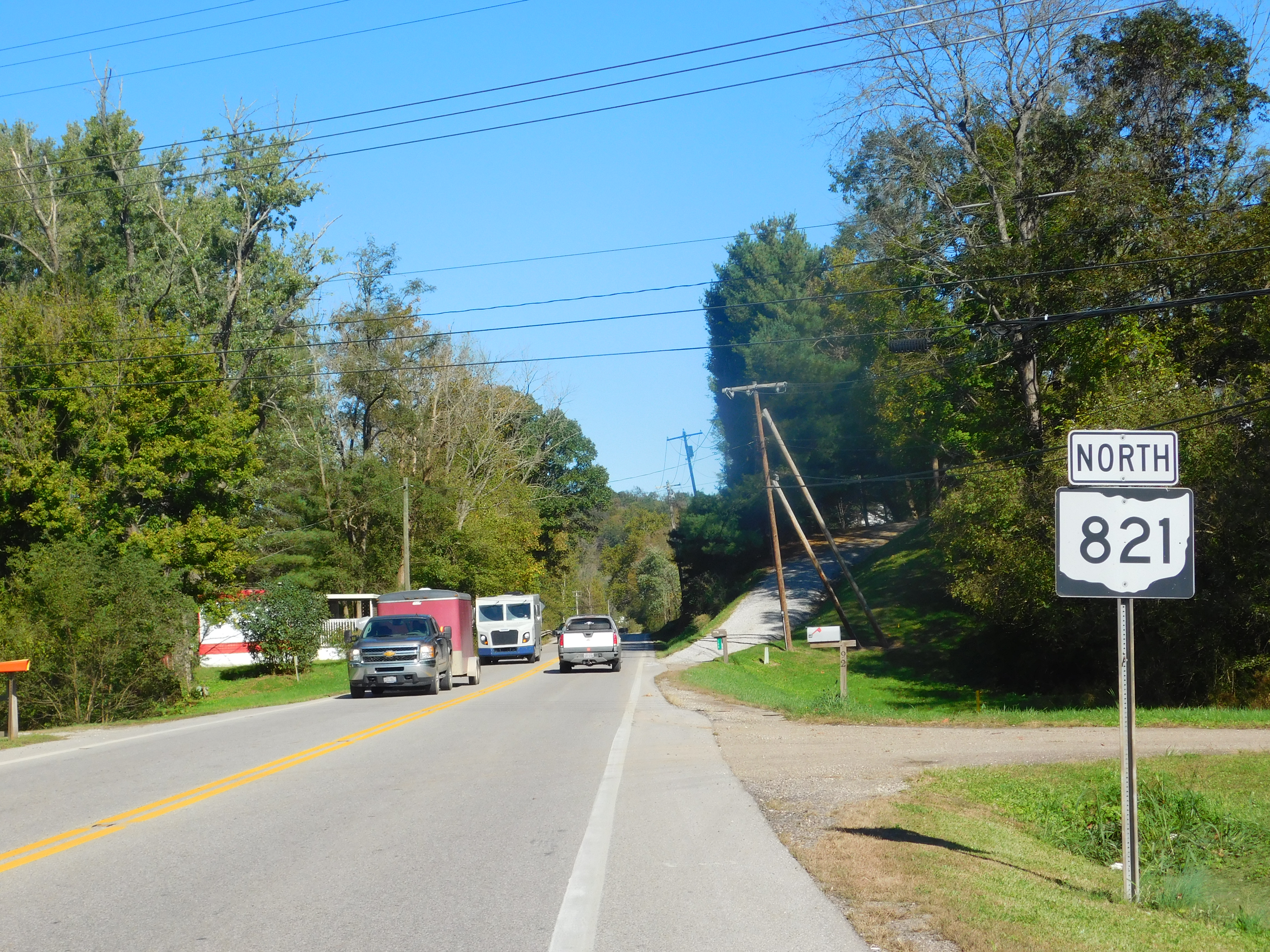
SR 821 north in Muskingum Township from SR 60

Along its path, SR 821 passes through central portions of Washington County and Noble County, and into the southern part of Guernsey County. No segment of the route is included as a part of the National Highway System (NHS). The NHS is a network of highways identified as being most important for the economy, mobility and defense of the nation.

== History ==
SR 821 was created in 1971. The designation was applied to what was the former routing of US 21 between Marietta and Byesville, prior to the completion of I-77 through the area by 1969. At the time, when the US 21 designation was removed from Ohio in favor of I-77, this stretch of roadway was removed from the state highway system. However, by 1971, it was introduced back into the system, and was given the designation of SR 821, based on its routing along the old path of US 21.

== Major intersections ==
County	Location	mi	km	Destinations	Notes
Washington	Muskingum Township	0.00	0.00	SR 60 – Marietta, Lowell, Beverly	
Washington	Muskingum Township	3.12	5.02	I-77 – Marietta	Exit 6 (I-77)
Washington	Salem Township	10.36	16.67	SR 145 north (Main Street) – Stafford, Lewisville	Southern terminus of SR 145
Washington	Salem Township	11.57	18.62	SR 530 west – Lowell	Eastern terminus of SR 530
Noble	Jefferson Township	20.96	33.73	SR 339 south – Beverly	Northern terminus of SR 339
Noble	Olive Township	28.33	45.59	SR 78 to I-77 – McConnelsville, Woodsfield	
Noble	Caldwell	29.66	47.73	SR 285 north (Planning Mill Street) – Sarahsville	Southern terminus of SR 285
Noble	Noble Township	32.38	52.11	SR 215 east – Sarahsville	Western terminus of SR 215
Noble	Belle Valley	32.84	52.85	I-77	Exit 28 (I-77)
Noble	Noble Township	33.52	53.95	SR 340 west – Cumberland	Eastern terminus of SR 340
Noble	Buffalo Township	39.81	64.07	SR 672 west	Eastern terminus of SR 672
Guernsey	Valley Township	42.60	68.56	SR 146 east (West Main Street) / Pleasant Road	Southern end of SR 146 concurrency
Guernsey	Valley Township	42.73	68.77	SR 146 west	Northern end of SR 146 concurrency
Guernsey	Valley Township	44.07	70.92	SR 313 – Chandlersville, Buffalo	
Guernsey	Byesville	48.13	77.46	SR 209 west (Main Street) / North 2nd Street	Southern end of SR 209 concurrency
Guernsey	Byesville	48.85	78.62	I-77 / CR 35 (Vocational Road) – Cleveland	Northern end of SR 209 concurrency; exit 41 (I-77)
1.000 mi = 1.609 km; 1.000 km = 0.621 mi: Concurrency terminus

== See also ==
- List of state highways in Ohio
