= Ohio State Route 566 =

State highway in Noble County, Ohio, US

State Route 566

Route information
- Maintained by ODOT
- Length: 4.80 mi (7.72 km)
- Existed: 1937–present

Major junctions
- South end: SR 147 near Mount Ephraim
- North end: SR 285 near Senecaville

Location
- Country: United States
- State: Ohio
- Counties: Noble

Highway system
- Ohio State Highway System; Interstate; US; State; Scenic
← SR 565	→ SR 567

State Route 566 (SR 566) is a north–south state highway in eastern Ohio, a U.S. state. Located exclusively in northern Noble County, SR 566 has its southern terminus at SR 147, at a T-intersection 1.25 miles (2.01 km) north of the unincorporated community of Mount Ephraim. Its northern terminus is at another T-intersection, this time with SR 285 approximately 1.25 miles (2.01 km) south of the village of Senecaville.

== Route description ==
SR 566 begins at a T-intersection with SR 147 north of Mount Ephraim. Heading northwest from this intersection, the route passes through Seneca Township amid a blend of woods and open fields, and passing the occasional residence. A series of spur gravel roadways split off from the state highway in this stretch to provide connections to additional area residences. SR 566 then arrives at its junction with SR 574, a T-intersection that serves as the intersecting state route's southern terminus.

From the SR 574 intersection, SR 566 turns more to the west-northwest, and is abutted by open fields on both sides of the roadway. The highway bends back to the northwest, and crosses into Wayne Township. With some patches of trees lining up along the roadway amid the open space, SR 566 passes the Township Road 120 intersection, then turns to the north. The state highway then bends back to the northwest, is briefly brushed up against by woods on both sides. and re-enters open farmland just before turning to the west, and arriving at its endpoint at a T-intersection with SR 285 south of the village of Senecaville.

No portion of SR 566 is included within the National Highway System.

== History ==
Since first being designated in 1937, SR 566 has maintained the same routing between SR 147 and SR 285 that it does today. No changes of major significance have taken place to SR 566 since its creation.

== Major intersections ==
The entire route is in Noble County.

Location	mi	km	Destinations	Notes
Seneca Township	0.00	0.00	SR 147 (Seneca Lake Road) – Sarahsville, Barnesville	
Seneca Township	1.59	2.56	SR 574 north	Southern terminus of SR 574
Wayne Township	4.80	7.72	SR 285 (Wintergreen Road) – Sarahsville, Senecaville	
1.000 mi = 1.609 km; 1.000 km = 0.621 mi
