= Ohio State Route 672 =

State highway in southeastern Ohio, US

State Route 672

Route information
- Maintained by ODOT
- Length: 3.11 mi (5.01 km)
- Existed: 1937–present

Major junctions
- South end: SR 146 near Cumberland
- North end: SR 821 near Pleasant City

Location
- Country: United States
- State: Ohio
- Counties: Guernsey, Noble

Highway system
- Ohio State Highway System; Interstate; US; State; Scenic
← SR 671	→ SR 673

State Route 672 (SR 672) is a 3.11-mile-long (5.01 km) east–west state highway in the southeastern part of the U.S. state of Ohio. It runs from its western terminus at a Y-intersection with SR 146 nearly 1.75 miles (2.82 km) northeast of Cumberland to its eastern terminus at a T-intersection with SR 821 about 3 miles (4.8 km) southwest of the village of Pleasant City.

== Route description ==
Along its path, SR 672 passes through the southwestern part of Guernsey County and a small part of northwestern Noble County. It begins at an intersection with SR 146 northeast of Cumberland in Spencer Township. From this intersection, it runs to the northeast up an incline before turning to the east-southeast and leveling off, passing amidst a blend of open fields and forest, with a few homes also along the way. It crosses Garvin School Road, then curves to the northeast at the Corwin Road T-intersection, then crosses into the southern portion of Valley Township. After bending to the east and then back to the southeast, it passes into Noble County, going a short distance through Buffalo Township prior to its endpoint at a T-intersection with SR 821.

This state route is not part of the National Highway System.

== History ==
The SR 672 designation was applied in 1937. Throughout its lifespan, the highway has utilized the same routing through portions of Guernsey and Noble Counties. The only change since its debut was the intersecting route at its eastern terminus. While its western terminus has always been at SR 146, the route it met at its eastern terminus was originally the predecessor to SR 821, U.S. Route 21 (US 21). SR 672 has been paved since its inception.

== Major intersections ==
County	Location	mi	km	Destinations	Notes
Guernsey	Spencer Township	0.00	0.00	SR 146	
Noble	Buffalo Township	3.11	5.01	SR 821 – Cambridge, Caldwell	
1.000 mi = 1.609 km; 1.000 km = 0.621 mi
