= Ohio State Route 285 =

State highway in eastern Ohio, US

State Route 285

Route information
- Maintained by ODOT
- Length: 28.03 mi (45.11 km)
- Existed: 1931–present

Major junctions
- South end: SR 821 in Caldwell
- I-70 / US 40 in Old Washington
- North end: US 22 / CR 71 in Madison Township

Location
- Country: United States
- State: Ohio
- Counties: Noble, Guernsey

Highway system
- Ohio State Highway System; Interstate; US; State; Scenic
| ← SR 284 | → SR 286 |

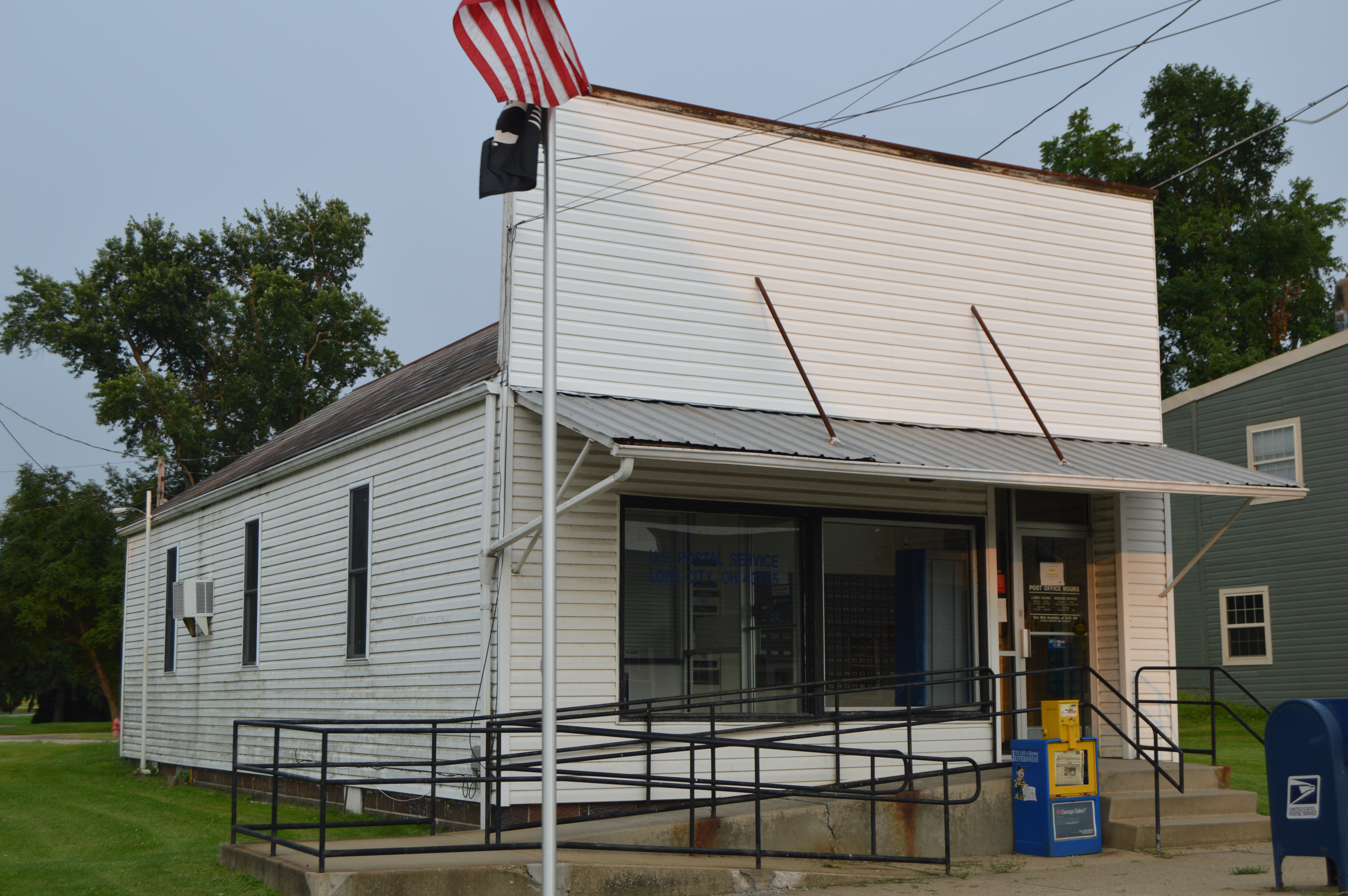
Post office in Lore City

State Route 285 (SR 285) is a 28.03-mile (45.11 km) long state highway in eastern Ohio. The route runs from SR 821 in Caldwell, Ohio, the county seat of Noble County, to US 22 in Madison Township, Guernsey County.

== Route description ==
No segment of SR 285 is included within the National Highway System.

== History ==
SR 285 was first designated in 1931 as a gravel spur route from SR 265 near Lore City to Senecaville. Within one year, the route was extended north via a dirt road to US 40 in Old Washington. By 1935, the route was extended to its current northern terminus at US 22. SR 285 was extended to its current southern terminus in Caldwell (at the time, US 21) by 1937. No major changes have occurred to the route since that time.

== Major intersections ==
| County | Location | mi | km | Destinations | Notes |
|---|---|---|---|---|---|
| Noble | Caldwell | 0.00 | 0.00 | SR 821 (Planing Mill Street / Miller Street) – Dexter City | |
| Noble | Sarahsville | 5.00 | 8.05 | SR 215 west – Belle Valley, Wolf Run State Park | Eastern terminus of SR 215 |
| Noble | Sarahsville | 5.31 | 8.55 | SR 146 east / Marietta Street – Summerfield | Southern end of SR 146 concurrency |
| Noble | Sarahsville | 5.36 | 8.63 | SR 146 west (Green Street) – Pleasant City | Northern end of SR 146 concurrency |
| Noble | Wayne Township | 13.84 | 22.27 | SR 566 east | Western terminus of SR 566 |
| Guernsey | Senecaville | 15.04 | 24.20 | SR 313 – Byesville, Seneca Lake | |
| Guernsey | Center Township | 19.10 | 30.74 | SR 265 to US 40 – Salesville | |
| Guernsey | Wills Township | 22.45 | 36.13 | I-70 / US 40 east | Exit 186 (I-70), southern end of US 40 concurrency |
| Guernsey | Old Washington | 22.89 | 36.84 | US 40 west – Cambridge | Northern end of US 40 concurrency |
| Guernsey | Madison Township | 28.03 | 45.11 | US 22 / CR 71 (Birmingham Road) – Cambridge, Cadiz | |
1.000 mi = 1.609 km; 1.000 km = 0.621 mi: Concurrency terminus
