= Ohio State Route 574 =

State highway in eastern Ohio, US

State Route 574

Route information
- Maintained by ODOT
- Length: 4.36 mi (7.02 km)
- Existed: 1947–present

Major junctions
- South end: SR 566 in Seneca Township
- North end: SR 313 in Richland Township

Location
- Country: United States
- State: Ohio
- Counties: Noble, Guernsey

Highway system
- Ohio State Highway System; Interstate; US; State; Scenic
← SR 573	→ SR 575

State Route 574 (SR 574) is a short state highway located around the southwest side of the Senecaville Lake in eastern Ohio. 4.36 miles (7.02 km) in length, it runs from SR 566 in Seneca Township, Noble County to SR 313 in Richland Township, Guernsey County just to the east of Senecaville. The route provides access to homes, recreational facilities, and the main dam in the vicinity of the lake.

== Route description ==
SR 574 begins at a stop-controlled T-intersection at SR 566 in northern Seneca Township. The route heads northeast through mostly forest with an occasional driveway for lake access. The road curves to the northwest after entering Wayne Township, passing the main entrance road for the Seneca Lake State Park. Shortly after the access road, the state route descends in elevation to a small village with a cluster of houses and turns onto the top of the Senecaville Dam. The route enters Guernsey County and is now on the top of the earthen dam. After crossing the dam's main spillway, SR 574 intersects the driveway to the Senecaville Lake Fish Hatchery. The route finishes crossing the dam, passes a small baseball field, and ends at SR 313 in Richland Township.

== History ==
The route was first brought into the state highway system as a dirt road around 1947. The entire route was asphalt-paved by 1958. Since its first designation, it has always followed the same route between SR 566 and SR 313 around the lake.

== Major intersections ==
County	Location	mi	km	Destinations	Notes
Noble	Seneca Township	0.00	0.00	SR 566 (Opossum Run Road)	
Guernsey	Richland Township	4.36	7.02	SR 313 (Lashley Road) – Senecaville	
1.000 mi = 1.609 km; 1.000 km = 0.621 mi
