= Ohio State Route 215 =

State highway in Noble County, Ohio, US

State Route 215

Route information
- Maintained by ODOT
- Length: 4.61 mi (7.42 km)
- Existed: 1923–present

Major junctions
- West end: SR 821 near Belle Valley
- East end: SR 285 near Sarahsville

Location
- Country: United States
- State: Ohio
- Counties: Noble

Highway system
- Ohio State Highway System; Interstate; US; State; Scenic
← SR 214	→ SR 216

State Route 215 (SR 215) is an east–west state highway in the southeastern portion of the U.S. state of Ohio. The western terminus of SR 215 is at a T-intersection with SR 821 just one-half mile (0.80 km) southeast of the village of Belle Valley and SR 821's junction with Interstate 77 (I-77). Its eastern terminus is at another T-intersection, this time with SR 285 just outside the village of Sarahsville.

Created in the middle of the 1920s, SR 215 is a two-lane rural highway that primarily serves as a connector between the Noble County villages of Belle Valley and Sarahsville. Its routing has changed over the years, but it has always been in or just outside Noble County. The highway passes in the vicinity of Wolf Run State Park along its way.

== Route description ==
All of SR 215 is situated within the central portion of Noble County. This state highway is not included as a part of the National Highway System.

SR 215 begins at a T-intersection with SR 821 nearly one-half mile (0.80 km) southeast of Belle Valley and I-77 in Noble Township. The highway runs northeasterly through rural terrain that starts out as open field but quickly transitions into forest. After meeting Wolf Run Road, SR 215 abuts the southeastern boundary of Wolf Run State Park. The route passes the Hickory Hill Road (County Road 14) intersection, then turns east and crosses into Center Township. SR 215 climbs up and down hilly terrain that is generally open field in the foreground, with trees forming a very scenic background. A few homes now appear alongside the highway as it bends to the southeast, and curves back to the northeast just prior to arriving at its endpoint at a T-intersection with SR 285 just west of Sarahsville.

== History ==
Since its creation in 1923, SR 215 has always had a presence in or near Noble County, but in different locations. The original routing of SR 215 consisted of the present SR 83 from its western junction with SR 78 to Cumberland, and the current SR 146 from Cumberland to its northern junction with SR 821 near Pleasant City. Four years later, SR 215 was shortened and re-routed. The portion that followed present-day SR 83 was re-designated as SR 76, while SR 146 and SR 215 swapped alignments. SR 146 took on its present-day routing from Cumberland to Pleasant City, while SR 215 was now routed along what today is known as Noble County Road 20, running from what then became SR 76 south of Cumberland to what was then a part of U.S. Route 21 (now SR 821) in Belle Valley.

SR 215 would stay this way until 1965, when the highway was extended on the east end, routed along a previously un-numbered roadway heading east from Belle Valley to its current eastern terminus at SR 285 just outside Sarahsville. Then, in 1971, the portion of SR 215 west of Belle Valley was removed from the state highway system, with jurisdiction being transferred to Noble County, which renamed the roadway as County Road 20. Consequently, at that point, SR 215 became the connector between SR 821 and SR 285 that it is today.

== Major intersections ==
The entire route is in Noble County.

Location	mi	km	Destinations	Notes
Noble Township	0.00	0.00	SR 821 (Marietta Road) – Caldwell, Belle Valley	
Center Township	4.61	7.42	SR 285 – Caldwell	
1.000 mi = 1.609 km; 1.000 km = 0.621 mi
