= Ohio State Route 147 =

State highway in eastern Ohio, US

State Route 147

Route information
- Maintained by ODOT
- Length: 58.40 mi (93.99 km)
- Existed: 1923–present

Major junctions
- West end: SR 78 near Sarahsville
- East end: SR 7 near Bellaire

Location
- Country: United States
- State: Ohio
- Counties: Noble, Belmont

Highway system
- Ohio State Highway System; Interstate; US; State; Scenic
← SR 146	→ SR 148

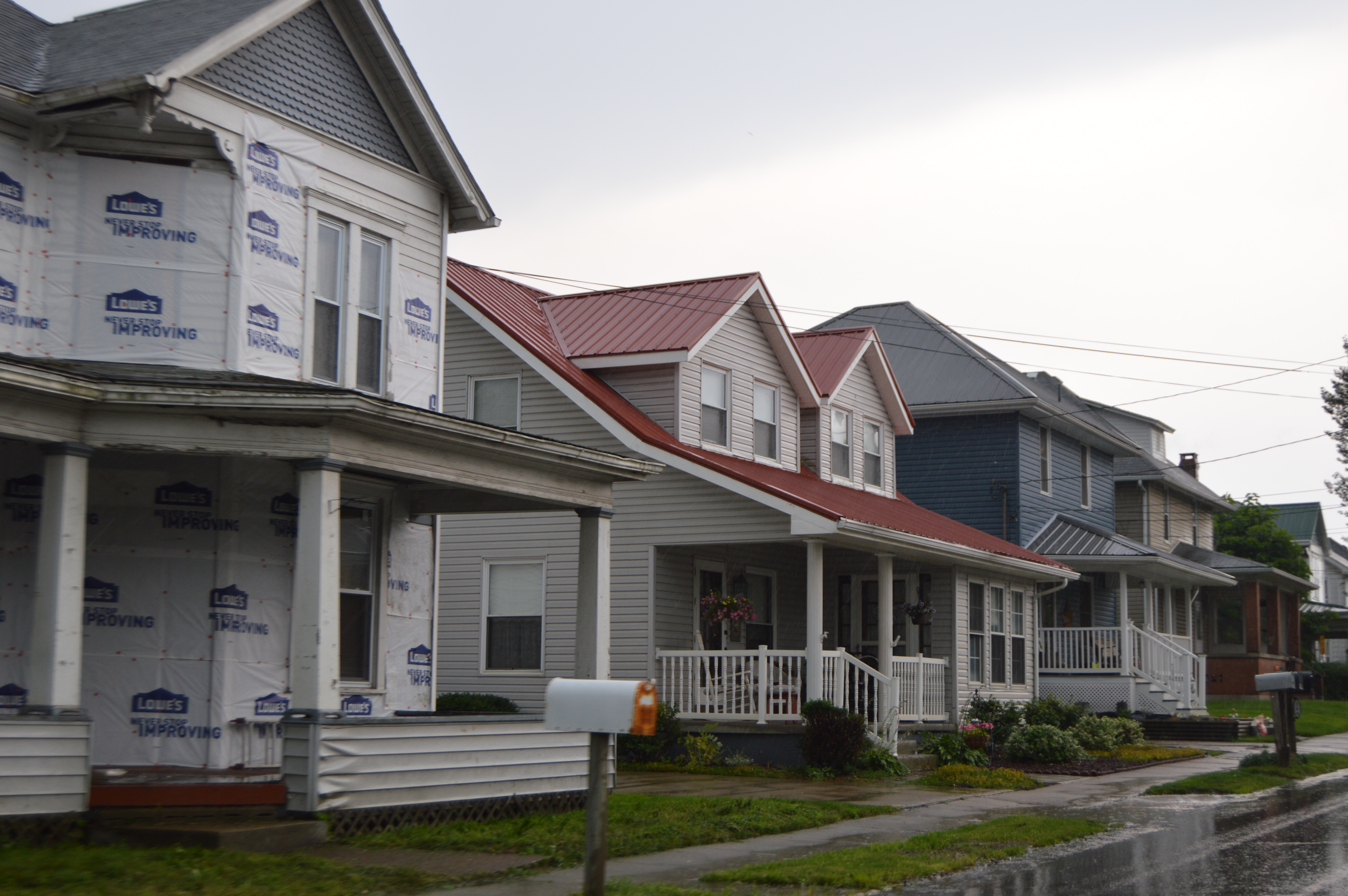
Houses in Bethesda

State Route 147 (SR 147) is an east–west state highway in the eastern portion of the U.S. state of Ohio. Its eastern terminus is at State Route 7 near Bellaire, with its western terminus at SR 78 in Noble County, Ohio. The highway passes near Senecaville Lake near Batesville.

== History ==
SR 147 was commissioned in 1923, along its current route. In 1930, the western terminus was moved to an intersection to the newly commissioned SR 146, in Sarahsville. The western terminus was moved back to its current location in 1932.

== Major intersections ==
County	Location	mi	km	Destinations	Notes
Noble	Center Township	0.00	0.00	SR 78 – Woodsfield, Caldwell	
Noble	Sarahsville	2.60	4.18	SR 146 west / Monroe Street – Pleasant City, Wolf Run State Park	Western end of SR 146 concurrency
Noble	Center Township	3.50	5.63	SR 146 east – Summerfield	Eastern end of SR 146 concurrency
Noble	Seneca Township	8.06	12.97	SR 566 north – Seneca Lake Park	Southern terminus of SR 566
Noble	Beaver Township	13.56	21.82	SR 313 west – Senecaville	Eastern terminus of SR 313
Noble	Batesville	17.03	27.41	SR 513 south – Summerfield	Western end of SR 513 concurrency
Noble	Batesville	17.11	27.54	SR 513 north – Quaker City	Eastern end of SR 513 concurrency
Belmont	Somerset Township	21.06	33.89	SR 379 south	Northern terminus of SR 379
Belmont	Warren Township	22.18	35.70	SR 265 west	Eastern terminus of SR 265
Belmont	Barnesville	25.54	41.10	SR 800 south (South Chestnut Street)	Western end of SR 800 concurrency
Belmont	Barnesville	25.98	41.81	SR 800 north (Chestnut Street) / Main Street	Eastern end of SR 800 concurrency
Belmont	Goshen Township	34.19	55.02	SR 149 north to I-70 – Flushing	Western end of SR 149 concurrency
Belmont	Belmont	34.70	55.84	SR 149 east (East Main Street) / Jefferson Street	Western end of SR 149 concurrency
Belmont	Smith Township	40.64	65.40	SR 9 north – St. Clairsville	Western end of SR 9 concurrency
Belmont	Smith Township	41.41	66.64	SR 9 south – Armstrongs Mills	Eastern end of SR 9 concurrency
Belmont	Pultney Township	58.23– 58.40	93.71– 93.99	SR 7 – Powhatan Point, Bridgeport	Interchange
1.000 mi = 1.609 km; 1.000 km = 0.621 mi: Concurrency terminus
