= Ohio State Route 761 =

State highway in Ohio, US

State Route 761
- Kennonsburg Road

Route information
- Maintained by ODOT
- Length: 4.33 mi (6.97 km)
- Existed: 1974–present

Major junctions
- South end: SR 313 near Salesville
- North end: SR 265 in Salesville

Location
- Country: United States
- State: Ohio
- Counties: Noble, Guernsey

Highway system
- Ohio State Highway System; Interstate; US; State; Scenic
← SR 757	→ SR 762
← I-670	→ SR 671

State Route 761 (SR 761) is a short state highway in the east-central portion of Ohio. The highway runs for 4.3 miles (6.9 km) from a T-intersection with SR 313 approximately four miles (6.4 km) southwest of Salesville to its junction with SR 265 in Salesville. This state route is also known as Kennonsburg Road for its entire length.

== Route description ==
SR 761 begins at a T-intersection with SR 313 in northeastern Noble County's Wayne Township, where SR 313 forms the western and southern legs of the intersection. For its duration, SR 761 traverses hilly terrain that is composed of both forest and grassland. Heading northeastward from its southern terminus, the state highway passes T-intersections with Noble County Road 33 and Eagon Hill Road, then bends to the north as it crosses the county line into Guernsey County's Millwood Township. Turning to the northeast, SR 761 now curves its way through a heavily wooded stretch through the Sycamore Road intersection, then runs northerly briefly to where it meets New Gottengen Road. SR 761 runs northeasterly from there into Salesville, where it comes to an end at its junction with SR 265, an intersection where SR 265 forms the northern and eastern approaches.

== History ==
Prior to the start of construction of Interstate 670 in the Columbus vicinity, the current routing of SR 761, along with the portion of SR 313 from the SR 761 junction to its eastern terminus at SR 147 was designated as SR 670. In 1974, because of construction on the future Interstate 670, and the rule that no state highway designation may duplicate a U.S. or Interstate highway designation within Ohio, the portion of SR 670 between SR 313 and SR 265 became SR 761, and the remainder became an extension of SR 313.

== Major intersections ==
County	Location	mi	km	Destinations	Notes
Noble	Wayne Township	0.00	0.00	SR 313 – Senecaville	
Guernsey	Salesville	4.33	6.97	SR 265 (Main Street / Washington Street)	
1.000 mi = 1.609 km; 1.000 km = 0.621 mi
