= Chandlersville, Ohio =

Unincorporated community in Ohio, U.S.

Coordinates: 39°53′54″N 81°49′38″W

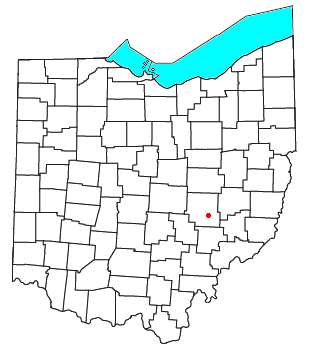
Location of Chandlersville, Ohio

Chandlersville is an unincorporated community in western Salt Creek Township, Muskingum County, Ohio, United States. It has a post office with the ZIP code 43727. It lies along State Route 146 at its intersection with State Routes 284 and 313.

== History ==
Chandlersville was laid out in 1842. A post office called Chandlersville has been in operation since 1843. The community was named for Captain John Chandler, a pioneer settler. Besides the post office, Chandlersville had several stores and a sawmill.
