= Ohio State Route 146 =

State highway in eastern Ohio, US

State Route 146

Route information
- Maintained by ODOT
- Length: 65.38 mi (105.22 km)
- Existed: 1924–present

Major junctions
- West end: SR 16 near Nashport
- I-70 in Zanesville; US 22 / US 40 / SR 93 in Zanesville
- East end: SR 78 in Summerfield

Location
- Country: United States
- State: Ohio
- Counties: Licking, Muskingum, Guernsey, Noble

Highway system
- Ohio State Highway System; Interstate; US; State; Scenic
← SR 145	→ SR 147

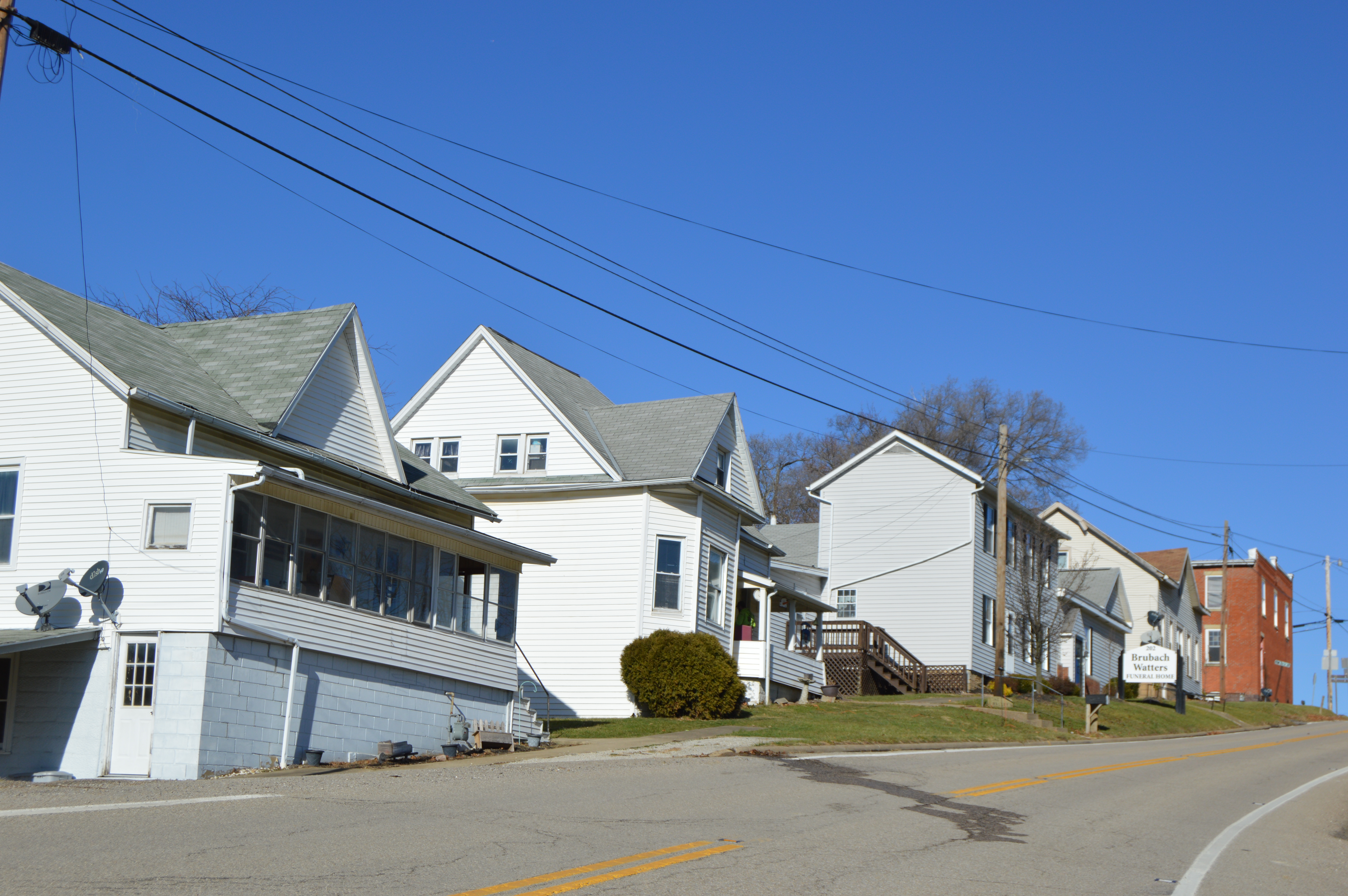
Entering Summerfield from the south

State Route 146 (SR 146) is an east-west state highway in the eastern portion of the U.S. state of Ohio. It runs 65.38 miles (105.22 km) from SR 16 near Nashport to SR 78 in Summerfield.

== Major intersections ==
County	Location	mi	km	Destinations	Notes
Licking	Hanover Township	0.00– 0.20	0.00– 0.32	SR 16 / CR 273 (Toboso Road) – Coshocton, Newark, Hanover	Interchange
Muskingum	Licking Township	4.31	6.94	SR 586 north – Frazeysburg, Mount Vernon	Southern terminus of SR 586
Muskingum	Zanesville	15.65	25.19	SR 60G (Blue Avenue) to I-70	Western end of unsigned SR 60G concurrency
Muskingum	Zanesville	16.00	25.75	SR 60 north (Maple Avenue) / SR 60G ends	Eastern end of unsigned SR 60G concurrency; western end of SR 60 concurrency
Muskingum	Zanesville	16.75	26.96	SR 666 north (Zane Street)	Southern terminus of SR 666
Muskingum	Zanesville	16.95– 17.00	27.28– 27.36	I-70 / Elm Street – Columbus, Wheeling, W.Va.	Exit 155 (I-70)
Muskingum	Zanesville	17.18	27.65	US 22 east / US 40 east / SR 93 north (Greenwood Avenue)	Western end of US 22 / US 40 / SR 93 concurrencies
Muskingum	Zanesville	17.30	27.84	US 22 west / US 40 west / SR 93 south (Main Street)	Eastern end of US 22 / US 40 / SR 93 concurrencies
Muskingum	Zanesville	17.55	28.24	SR 60 south (Wayne Avenue) / Marietta Street	Eastern end of SR 60 concurrency
Muskingum	Salt Creek Township	28.02	45.09	SR 313 east	Western terminus of SR 313
Muskingum	Salt Creek Township	28.12	45.25	SR 284 south	Northern terminus of SR 284
Guernsey	Spencer Township	37.52	60.38	SR 340 west (Zeno Road)	Western end of SR 340 concurrency
Guernsey	Cumberland	37.95	61.07	SR 83 (Church Street)	
Guernsey	Cumberland	38.25	61.56	SR 340 east (South Cambridge Street) to East Main Street / I-77	Eastern end of SR 340 concurrency
Guernsey	Spencer Township	40.41	65.03	SR 672 east	Western terminus of SR 672
Guernsey	Valley Township	45.90	73.87	SR 821 north – Byesville	Western end of SR 821 concurrency
Guernsey	Valley Township	46.03	74.08	SR 821 south / Pleasant Road – Caldwell	Eastern end of SR 821 concurrency
Noble	Sarahsville	54.99	88.50	SR 285 north (Marietta Street) / Green Street – Senecaville	Western end of SR 285 concurrency
Noble	Sarahsville	55.04	88.58	SR 285 south / Marietta Street – Caldwell, Wolf Run State Park	Eastern end of SR 285 concurrency
Noble	Sarahsville	55.16	88.77	SR 147 west (Monroe Street)	Western end of SR 147 concurrency
Noble	Center Township	56.06	90.22	SR 147 east – Barnesville	Eastern end of SR 147 concurrency
Noble	Summerfield	64.96	104.54	SR 513 north (North Main Street) / Cross Street – Batesville	Southern terminus of SR 513
Noble	Summerfield	65.25	105.01	SR 78 / CR 1 – Woodsfield, Caldwell	
1.000 mi = 1.609 km; 1.000 km = 0.621 mi: Concurrency terminus
