= Ohio State Route 340 =

State highway in eastern Ohio, US

State Route 340

Route information
- Maintained by ODOT
- Length: 13.18 mi (21.21 km)

Major junctions
- West end: SR 284 in Meigs Township
- East end: SR 821 in Belle Valley

Location
- Country: United States
- State: Ohio
- Counties: Muskingum, Guernsey, Noble

Highway system
- Ohio State Highway System; Interstate; US; State; Scenic
| ← SR 339 | → SR 341 |

State Route 340 (SR 340) is a 13.2-mile-long (21.2 km) state highway in eastern Ohio. The route runs from its western terminus at SR 284 in the Meigs Township community of Zeno to its eastern terminus at SR 821 in the northwestern corner of Belle Valley.

== Route description ==
The road begins at a T-intersection with SR 284 in a forested area of Meigs Township, Muskingum County. SR 340 heads northeast up some hills until it crests the highest hill and curves to the east-northeast. For the next 1 1/3 miles (2.1 km), the road is straight and runs through an open area with a pair of ponds; this area was formerly part of a strip mine. Past the strip mine, the road passes through a mix of forest and open land paralleling Collins Fork and begins to curve to the northeast again. After briefly entering Brookfield Township, Noble County, the route enters Spencer Township, Guernsey County and joins a concurrency with SR 146. The two roads head east into Cumberland along Main Street. On the west side of the village, Main Street intersects SR 83, a north–south highway that carries Church Street through the village. Through Cumberland, the road heads mainly through residential neighborhoods with some commercial businesses along the road. At Cambridge Street, SR 146 heads north along it while SR 340 travels south along the road out of the village. At the village's southern border, the road curves to the southeast heading briefly through open land. Upon its reentry to Brookfield Township, Noble County, SR 340 passes through forest but further east in the township, the land opens to clear fields and the road passes the transmitter facility for WWKC. The road crosses into Noble Township and passes through the community of Hiramsburg, a settlement consisting of only a small number of houses. Continuing southeast towards Belle Valley, SR 340 passes a few houses before curving to the east and ending at an intersection with SR 821 on the border of Belle Valley and Noble Township.

No part of SR 340 is included within the National Highway System.

== History ==
SR 340 was first proposed in 1932 and 1933 as a road connecting Cumberland with Coal Ridge at what was then US 21. By 1934, the route was shifted slightly south; it ran from Cumberland to Belle Valley. In 1938, SR 340 took over the entire alignment of SR 673 which ran from Blue Rock to Cumberland, but once again, the eastern terminus was in Coal Ridge. The eastern terminus was moved back to Belle Valley by 1940 and has remained there since. Between 1962 and 1964, the section of roadway between Blue Rock and SR 284 was removed from the state highway system and the remaining route has been unchanged since.

== Major intersections ==
| County | Location | mi | km | Destinations | Notes |
|---|---|---|---|---|---|
| Muskingum | Meigs Township | 0.00 | 0.00 | SR 284 | |
| Noble | No major junctions | | | | |
| Guernsey | Spencer Township | 5.21 | 8.38 | SR 146 west (Spratt Road) | Western end of SR 146 concurrency |
| Guernsey | Cumberland | 5.65 | 9.09 | SR 83 (Church Street) | |
| Guernsey | Cumberland | 5.94 | 9.56 | SR 146 east (North Cambridge Street) / East Main Street | Eastern end of SR 146 concurrency |
| Noble | Belle Valley | 13.18 | 21.21 | SR 821 to I-77 – Cambridge, Caldwell | |
1.000 mi = 1.609 km; 1.000 km = 0.621 mi: Concurrency terminus
