= Farmer Vaughn =

American baseball player (1864–1914)

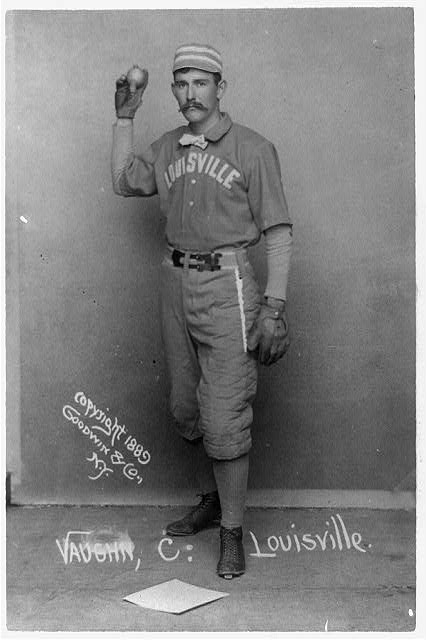
- Catcher
- Born: March 1, 1864; Ruraldale, Ohio, U.S.
- Died: February 21, 1914 (aged 49); Cincinnati, Ohio, U.S.
- Batted: Right Threw: Right

MLB debut
- October 7, 1886, for the Cincinnati Red Stockings

Last MLB appearance
- July 15, 1899, for the Cincinnati Reds

MLB statistics
- Batting average: .274
- Home runs: 21
- Runs batted in: 525
- Stats at Baseball Reference

Teams
- Cincinnati Red Stockings (1886); Louisville Colonels (1888–1890); New York Giants (1890); Cincinnati Kelly's Killers (1891); Milwaukee Brewers (1891); Cincinnati Reds (1892–1899)

Henry Francis "Farmer" Vaughn (March 1, 1864 – February 21, 1914) was an American professional baseball catcher. He played in Major League Baseball for the Cincinnati Red Stockings, Louisville Colonels, New York Giants, Cincinnati Kelly's Killers, Milwaukee Brewers and Cincinnati Reds. He was born in Ruraldale, Ohio.

In 13 seasons, he played in 915 games and had 3,454 at bats, 474 runs, 946 hits, 147 doubles, 53 triples, 21 home runs, 525 RBI, 92 stolen bases, 151 walks, .274 batting average, .307 on-base percentage, .365 slugging percentage and 1,262 total bases.

He died in Cincinnati, Ohio, at the age of 49.

== Sources ==
- Career statistics from Baseball Reference · Baseball Reference (Minors) · Retrosheet · Baseball Almanac
