= Ruraldale, Ohio =

Unincorporated community in Ohio, U.S.

Coordinates: 39°46′56″N 81°50′40″W

Ruraldale is an unincorporated community in the U.S. state of Ohio. It is located in Blue Rock Township in southern Muskingum County.

== History ==
Ruraldale was originally called Rockville, but the name was changed to Ruraldale when the town site was platted in 1854. A post office called Rural Dale was established in 1852, the name was changed to Ruraldale in 1895, and the post office closed in 1902.

== Notable person ==
Farmer Vaughn, a catcher for the Cincinnati Reds, was born at Ruraldale in 1864.
