= Ohio State Route 284 =

State highway in Ohio, US

State Route 284

Route information
- Maintained by ODOT
- Length: 17.41 mi (28.02 km)
- Existed: 1930–present

Major junctions
- South end: SR 83 near McConnelsville
- North end: SR 146 in Chandlersville

Location
- Country: United States
- State: Ohio
- Counties: Morgan, Muskingum

Highway system
- Ohio State Highway System; Interstate; US; State; Scenic
← SR 283	→ SR 285

State Route 284 (SR 284, OH 284) is a north–south state highway in east central Ohio, a U.S. state. State Route 284 has its southern terminus is at State Route 83 approximately 8 miles (13 km) northeast of McConnelsville, and just 0.25 miles (0.40 km) north of the western split of the concurrency State Route 83 has with State Route 78. The northern terminus of State Route 284 is at a T-intersection with State Route 146 in the unincorporated community of Chandlersville. A portion of SR 284 is part of the Morgan County Scenic Byway.

== Route description ==
State Route 284 runs through portions of Morgan and Muskingum Counties. No portion of this state highway is included within the National Highway System.

== History ==
The year 1930 marked the debut of State Route 284 in the Ohio state highway system. Routed at inception along the path that it currently occupies, State Route 284 has not experienced any significant changes.

== Major intersections ==
County	Location	mi	km	Destinations	Notes
Morgan	Bristol Township	0.00	0.00	SR 83 – McConnelsville	
Muskingum	Meigs Township	7.71	12.41	SR 340 east	Western terminus of SR 340
Muskingum	Salt Creek Township	17.41	28.02	SR 146 (Chandlersville Road)	
1.000 mi = 1.609 km; 1.000 km = 0.621 mi
