= Buffalo Township, Ohio =

Township in Ohio, US

Buffalo Township, Noble County, Ohio
- Township
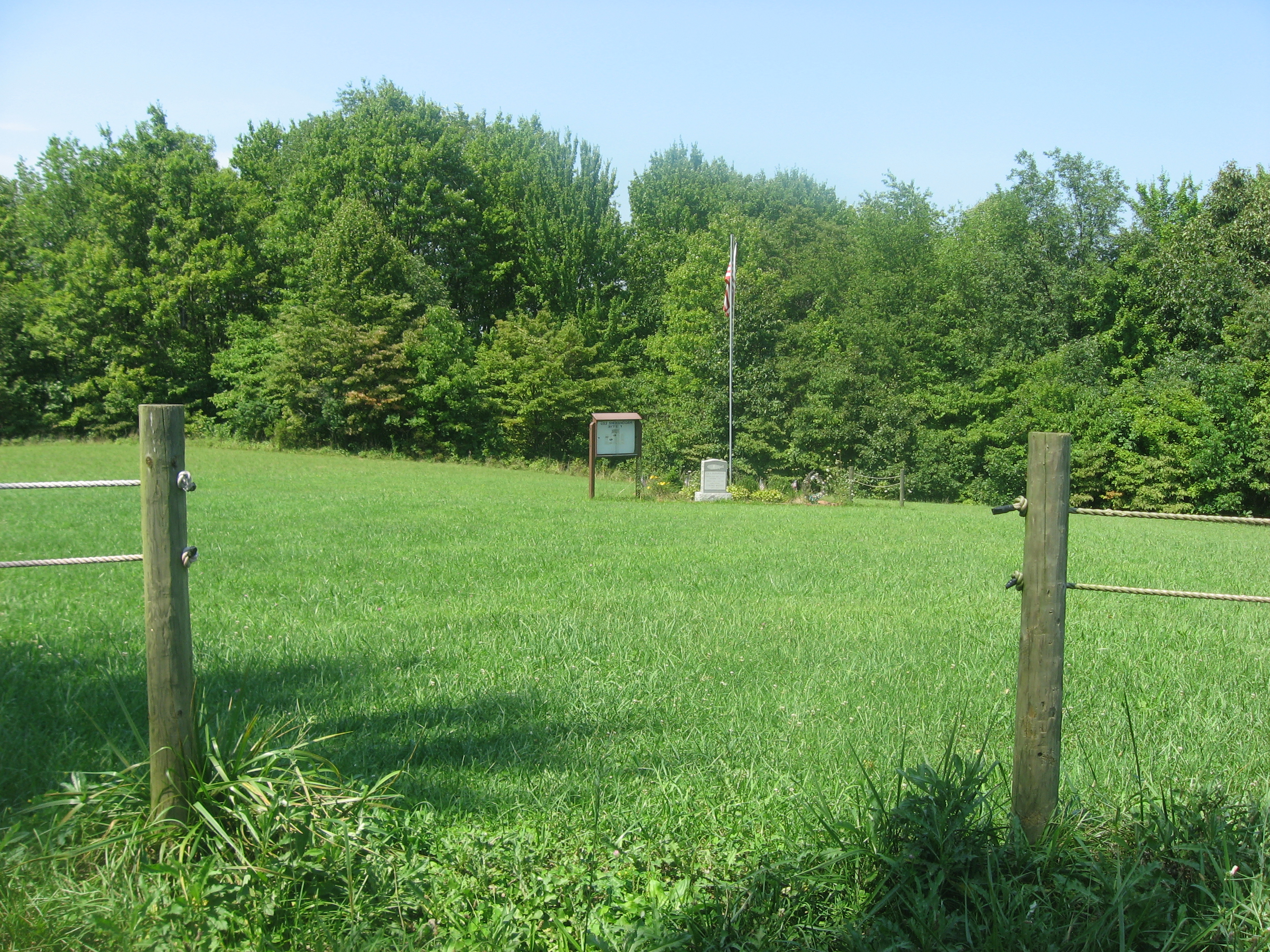
- A memorial at one of the Shenandoah crash sites

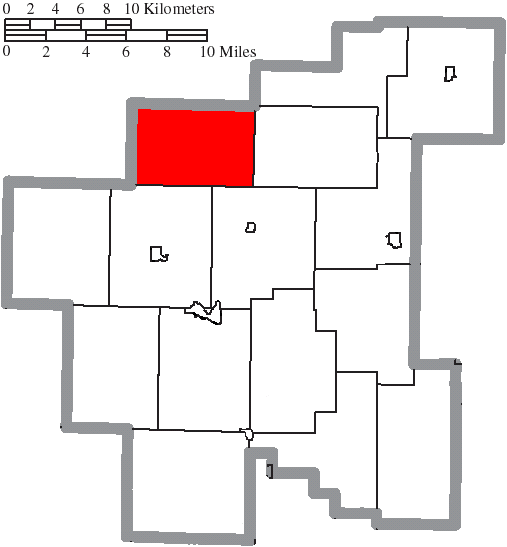
- Location of Buffalo Township in Noble County
- Coordinates: 39°51′47″N 81°31′52″W
- Country: United States
- State: Ohio
- County: Noble

Area
  - Total: 24.5 sq mi (63.4 km^{2})
  - Land: 24.5 sq mi (63.4 km^{2})
  - Water: 0 sq mi (0.0 km^{2})
- Elevation: 950 ft (290 m)

Population (2020)
  - Total: 885
  - Density: 36.2/sq mi (14.0/km^{2})
- Time zone: UTC-5 (Eastern (EST))
  - Summer (DST): UTC-4 (EDT)
- FIPS code: 39-10142
- GNIS feature ID: 1086741

Buffalo Township is one of the fifteen townships of Noble County, Ohio, United States. The 2020 census found 885 people in the township.

== Geography ==
Located in the northern part of the county, it borders the following townships:

- Valley Township, Guernsey County - north
- Richland Township, Guernsey County - northeast
- Wayne Township - northeast corner
- Seneca Township - east
- Center Township - southeast
- Noble Township - south
- Spencer Township, Guernsey County - west

No municipalities are located in Buffalo Township.

== Government ==
The township is governed by a three-member board of trustees, who are elected in November of odd-numbered years to a four-year term beginning on the following January 1. Two are elected in the year after the presidential election and one is elected in the year before it. There is also an elected township fiscal officer, who serves a four-year term beginning on April 1 of the year after the election, which is held in November of the year before the presidential election. Vacancies in the fiscal officership or on the board of trustees are filled by the remaining trustees.
