= Mount Ephraim, Ohio =

- Unincorporated community
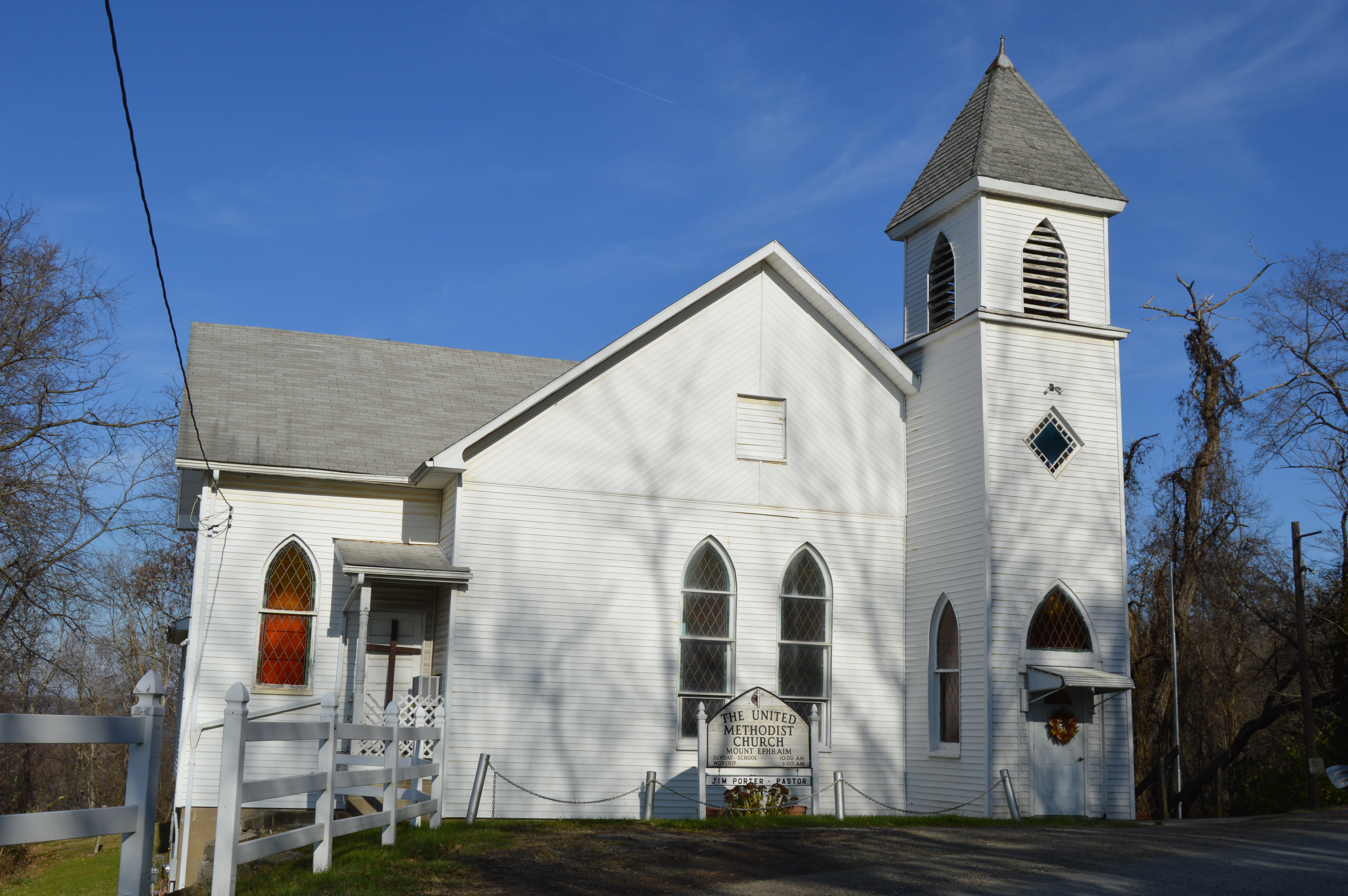
- Methodist church

- Location within Ohio Location within the United States
- Coordinates: 39°50′50″N 81°25′04″W
- Country: United States
- State: Ohio
- County: Noble
- Elevation: 1,138 ft (347 m)
- Time zone: UTC-5 (Eastern (EST))
  - Summer (DST): UTC-4 (EDT)
- Area code: 740
- GNIS feature ID: 1065068

Mount Ephraim is an unincorporated community in Noble County, Ohio, United States.

== History ==
Mount Ephraim was platted in 1838 by Ephraim Vorhies, and named for him. A post office was established at Mount Ephraim in 1843, and remained in operation until 1955.
