= Seneca Township, Noble County, Ohio =

Township in Ohio, US

- Township
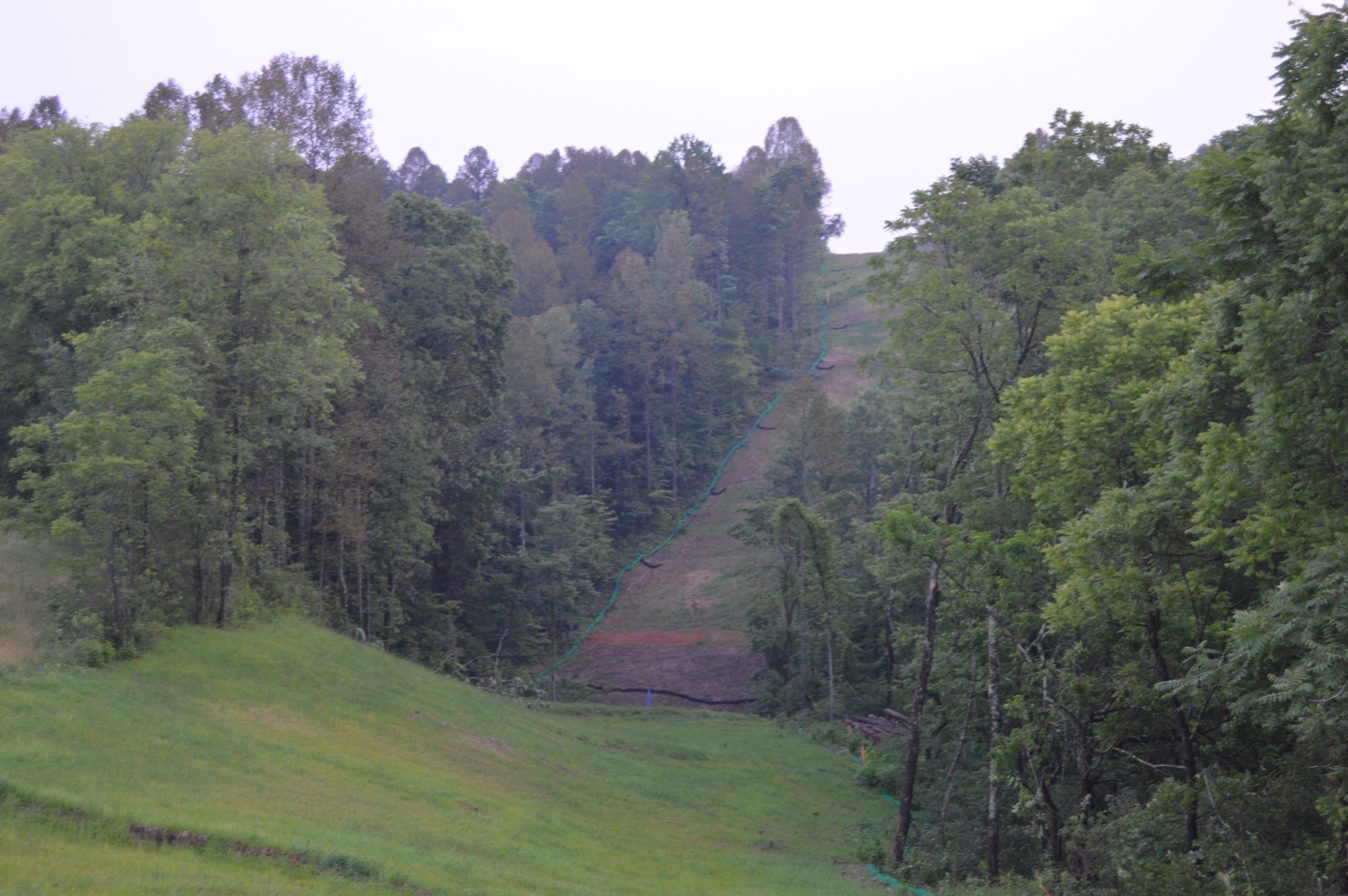
- Wooded fields on Lew Martin Road

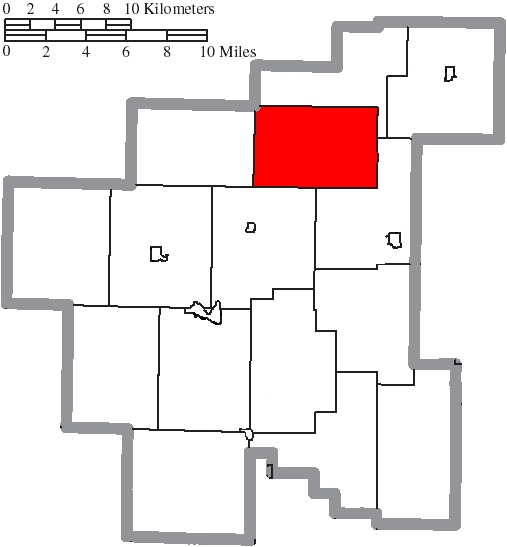
- Location of Seneca Township in Noble County
- Coordinates: 39°51′59″N 81°24′18″W
- Country: United States
- State: Ohio
- County: Noble

Area
  - Total: 24.5 sq mi (63.5 km^{2})
  - Land: 23.7 sq mi (61.5 km^{2})
  - Water: 0.77 sq mi (2.0 km^{2})
- Elevation: 1,086 ft (331 m)

Population (2020)
  - Total: 423
  - Density: 17.8/sq mi (6.88/km^{2})
- Time zone: UTC-5 (Eastern (EST))
  - Summer (DST): UTC-4 (EDT)
- FIPS code: 39-71352
- GNIS feature ID: 1086750

Seneca Township is one of the fifteen townships of Noble County, Ohio, United States. The 2020 census found 423 people in the township.

== Geography ==
Located in the northern part of the county, it borders the following townships:

- Wayne Township - north
- Marion Township - southeast
- Center Township - southwest
- Buffalo Township - west
- Richland Township, Guernsey County - northwest corner

No municipalities are located in Seneca Township, although the unincorporated community of Mount Ephraim is located in the township's northwest.

== Name and history ==
Statewide, other Seneca Townships are located in Monroe and Seneca counties.

== Government ==
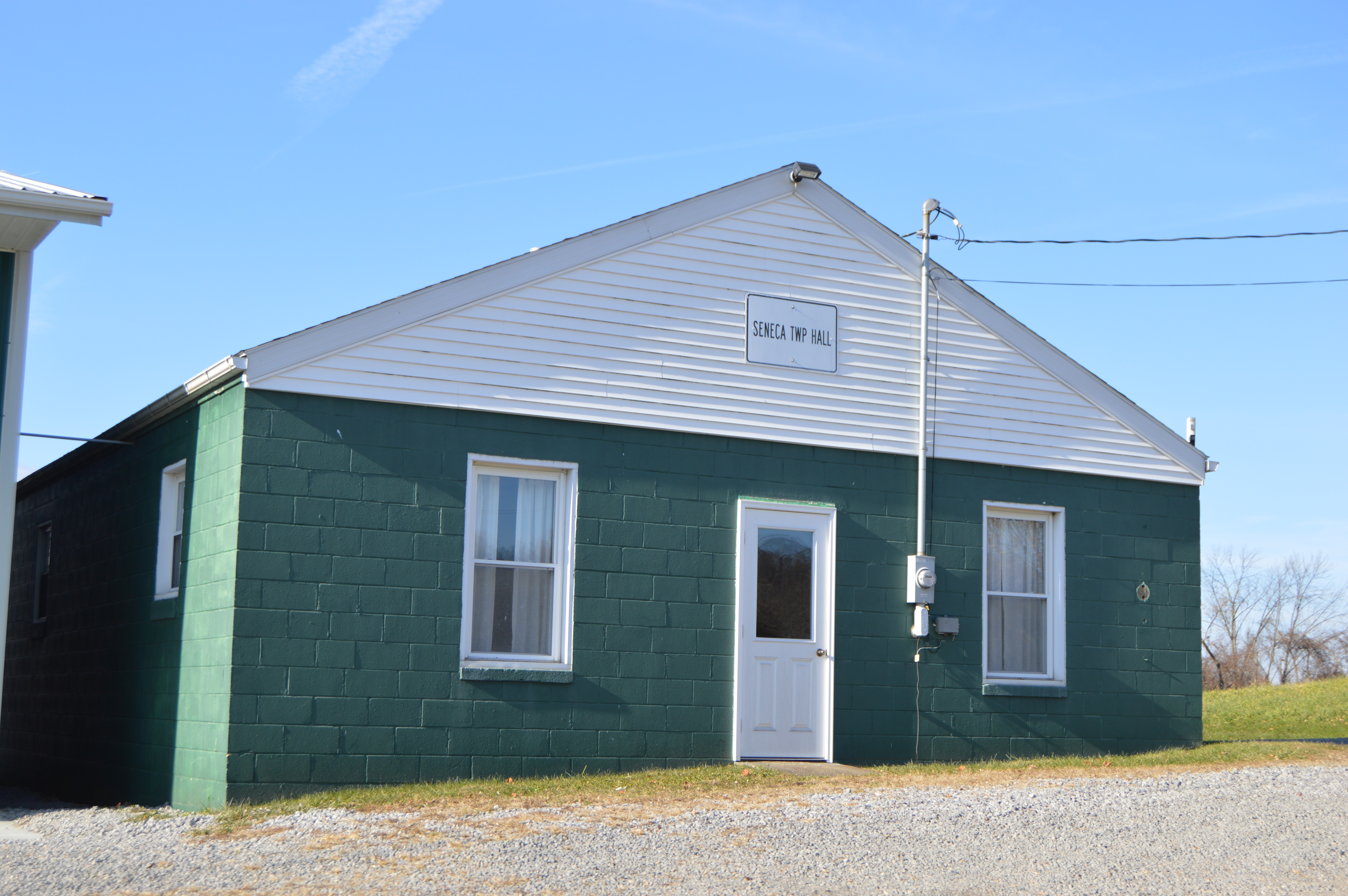
Township hall at Mount Ephraim

The township is governed by a three-member board of trustees, who are elected in November of odd-numbered years to a four-year term beginning on the following January 1. Two are elected in the year after the presidential election and one is elected in the year before it. There is also an elected township fiscal officer, who serves a four-year term beginning on April 1 of the year after the election, which is held in November of the year before the presidential election. Vacancies in the fiscal officership or on the board of trustees are filled by the remaining trustees.
