= Kennonsburg, Ohio =

Unincorporated community in Ohio, U.S.

Coordinates: 39°54′54″N 81°22′32″W

Kennonsburg is an unincorporated community in Noble County, in the U.S. state of Ohio.

== History ==
Kennonsburg was founded in 1846. A post office was established at Kennonsburg in 1849, and remained in operation until 1905.
