= Senecaville Lake =

Seneca Lake
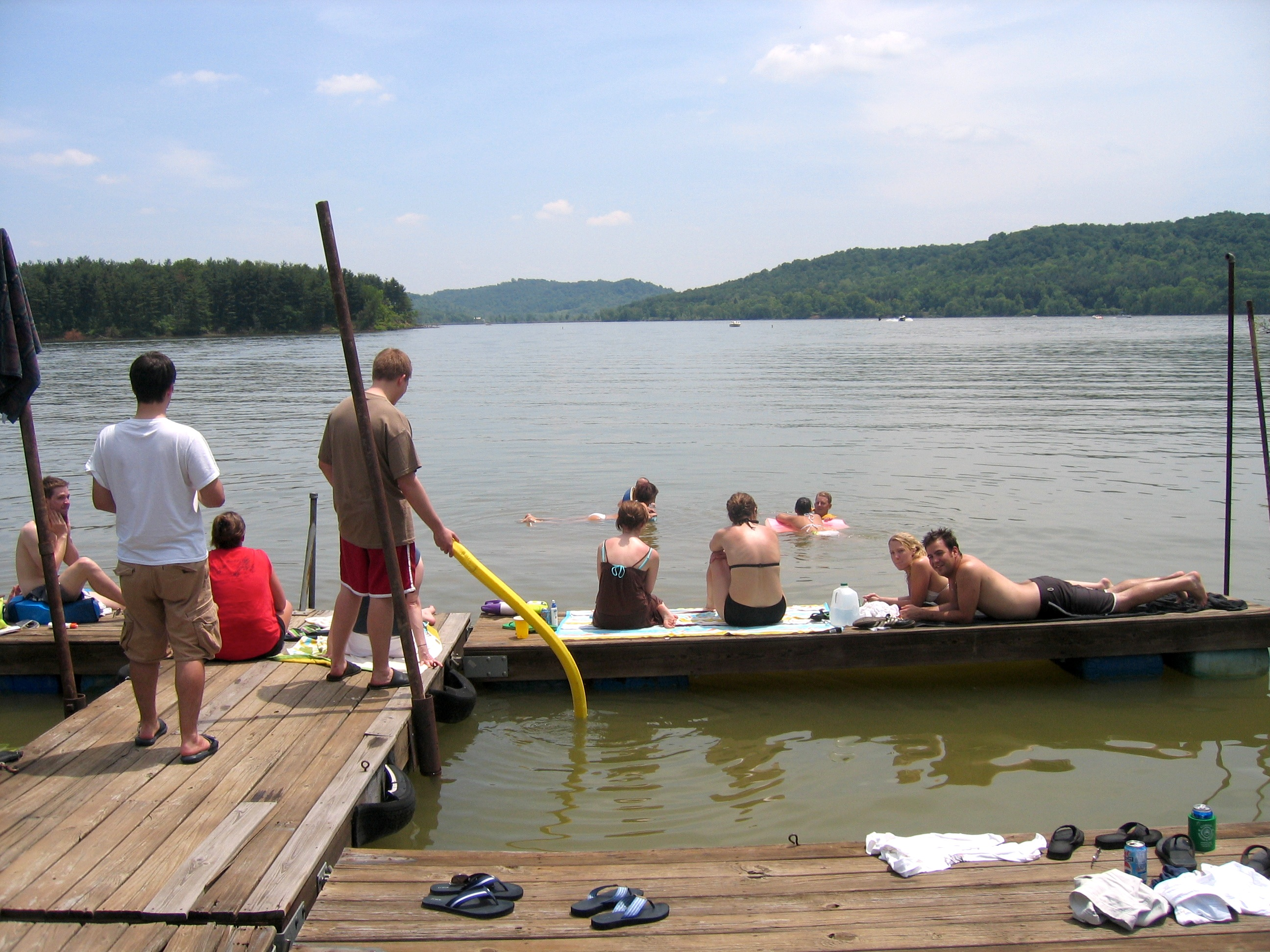
- Recreation is one of the lake's many uses.

- Location within Ohio Location within the United States
- Location: Noble / Guernsey counties, Ohio, USA
- Coordinates: 39°55′30″N 081°26′07″W
- Type: reservoir
- Primary outflows: Seneca Fork of Wills Creek
- Basin countries: United States
- Surface area: 5.5 sq mi (14 km^{2})
- Water volume: 88,500 acre⋅ft (0.1092 km^{3}) maximum storage
- Shore length^{1}: 45 mi (72 km)
- Surface elevation: 892 ft (272 m)
- Islands: Horse Island
- Settlements: Senecaville, Kennonsburg
- ^{1} Shore length is not a well-defined measure.

Seneca Lake is a reservoir in Guernsey and Noble Counties, Ohio. It is located approximately 13 miles (21 km) southeast of Cambridge near the village of Senecaville, Ohio. The lake is popular among recreation and fishing enthusiasts. It is often referred to locally as Seneca Lake.

== History ==
Senecaville Dam was built in 1937 by the U.S. Army Corps of Engineers as part of the Muskingum Watershed Conservancy District's flood control and water conservation project. The Seneca Fork of Wills Creek valley was dammed to create a flood control and water conservation reservoir. The reservoir presently forms a conservation pool for flood control, recreation, fish and wildlife, and for the maintenance of normal downstream flows during dry periods.

== Senecaville Dam ==
The Senecaville Dam is located at the northwest end of the lake near the village of Senecaville. Originally completed in 1937, the structure was modified in 1982. The dam is made of earthen construction and measures 49 feet (15 m) high by 2,350 feet (720 m) long. The core is homogeneous earth with a foundation of rock and soil. The dam is separated into two embankment sections, north and south, by a rock knoll, through which the outlet works run, across a section constructed as a low dike. Maximum discharge is 11400 cubic feet per second. Its capacity is 88,500 acre-feet (109,200,000 m^{3}). Normal storage is 43,500 acre-feet (53,700,000 m^{3}). It drains an area of 118 square miles (310 km^{2}).

== Recreation ==
The lake is in the Muskingum Watershed Conservancy District's chain of lakes and all boating, swimming, camping, and picnicking is under MWCD control. The MWCD coordinates many recreation activities at the lake and operates an activity center within Seneca Lake Park. The activity center provides day to day information on campground activities and current events. The MWCD has designated two swimming areas (one is within the park & one is by boat access). Picnic sites are available at the Seneca Lake Park.

A public boat launch ramp is available near the dam year round. The horsepower limit for boats on Seneca Lake is 399 horsepower (298 kW). There is one marina located on the lake, Seneca Marina, which is operated by private enterprise. The marina is a full-service facility with boat sales and rentals, fuel, supplies and docking. There is a restaurant called Dockside at the marina which is open mid April through September.

Limited hiking is available around Senecaville Dam. A more extensive hiking trail system is available within Seneca Lake Park. Camping at Seneca Lake is available through the MWCD.

Fireworks on the Lake take place on the closest Saturday night to the Fourth of July. The Fireworks are set off from the point near the camp grounds. Historically the fireworks were set off from the big island.

== Fishing ==
The Ohio Division of Wildlife annually leases public fishing and hunting rights on MWCD lakes and lands. Fishing is popular all around the lake wherever there is access to the water. At the dam site, fishing is available above and below the dam. Seneca Lake contains populations of largemouth bass, crappies, bluegills, bullheads, channel catfish, and saugeye. The lake has also been stocked with muskellunge and white bass with moderate success. These species of fish are stocked by the Division of Wildlife.

== Fish hatchery ==
There is also an Ohio Department of Natural Resources fish hatchery located below Senecaville Dam. This facility was acquired from the U.S. Fish and Wildlife Service in 1987. The hatchery has 37 ponds containing a total of 37 acres (150,000 m^{2}) of water. The facility also has two outdoor raceways and 18 indoor rearing troughs. Water is supplied by Seneca Lake, which can deliver 2,000 US gallons per minute (130 L/s). This water supply allows the hatchery to raise saugeye, walleye, hybrid striped bass, and channel catfish. The hatchery is open to visitors and will accommodate tour groups with advanced reservations.
