= Valley Township, Guernsey County, Ohio =

Township in Ohio, US

- Township
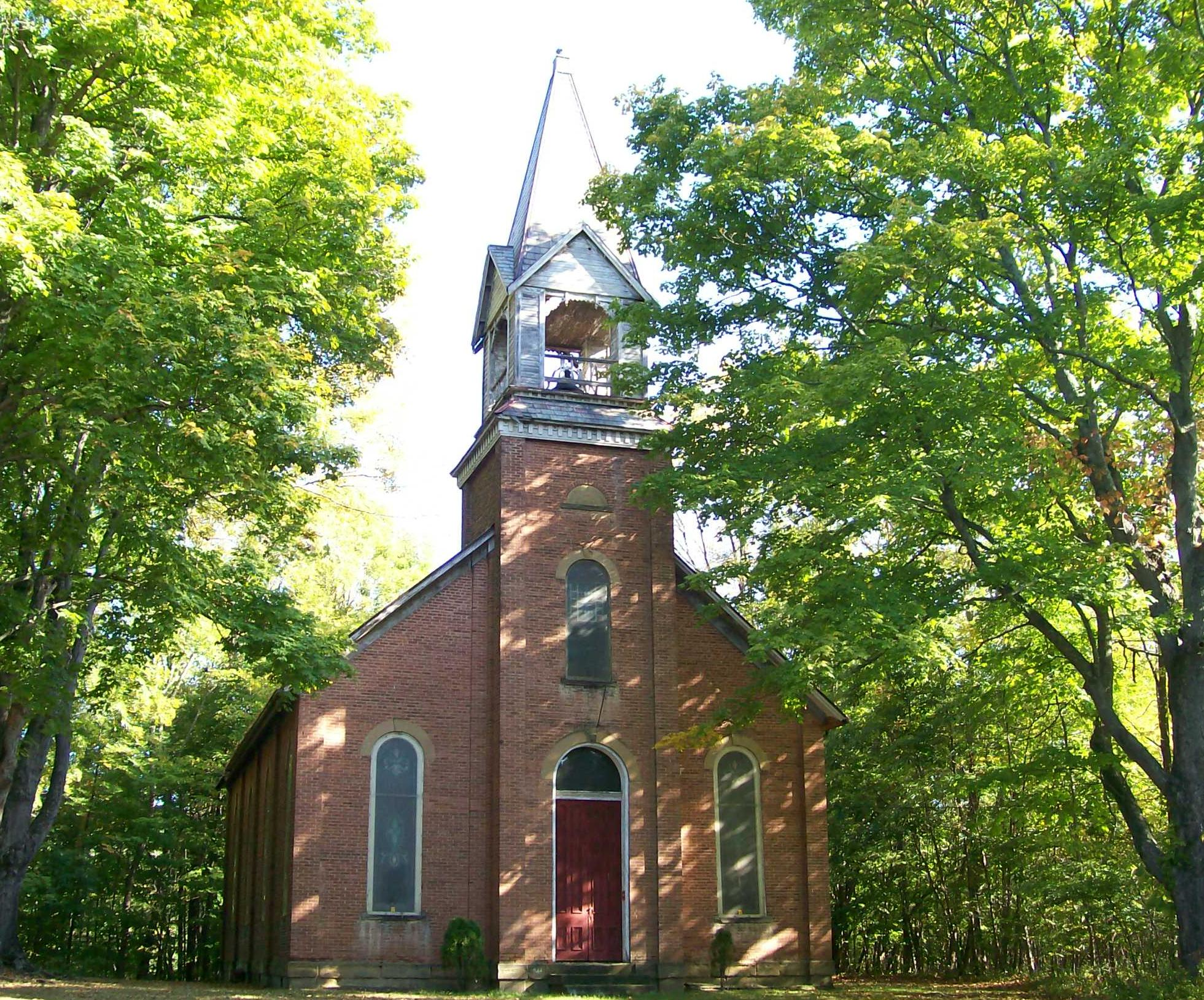
- Bethel Methodist Church

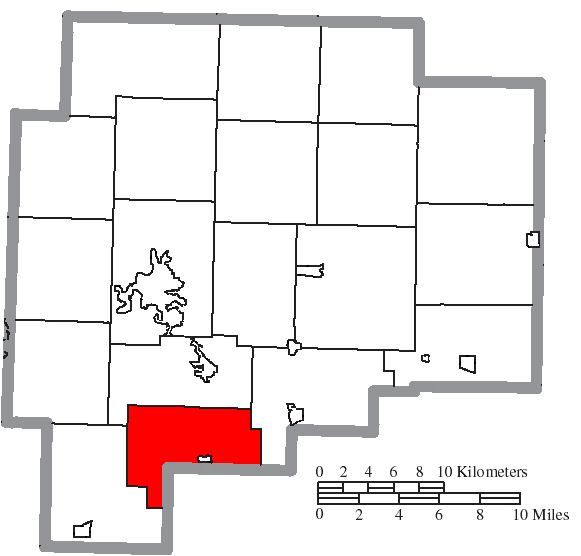
- Location of Valley Township in Guernsey County
- Coordinates: 39°54′53″N 81°32′47″W
- Country: United States
- State: Ohio
- County: Guernsey

Area
  - Total: 22.6 sq mi (58.6 km^{2})
  - Land: 22.6 sq mi (58.5 km^{2})
  - Water: 0.039 sq mi (0.1 km^{2})
- Elevation: 797 ft (243 m)

Population (2020)
  - Total: 2,041
  - Density: 90.4/sq mi (34.9/km^{2})
- Time zone: UTC-5 (Eastern (EST))
  - Summer (DST): UTC-4 (EDT)
- FIPS code: 39-79156
- GNIS feature ID: 1086191

Valley Township is one of the nineteen townships of Guernsey County, Ohio, United States. As of the 2020 census the population was 2,041.

== Geography ==
Located in the southern part of the county, it borders the following townships:

- Jackson Township - north
- Richland Township - east
- Buffalo Township, Noble County - south
- Spencer Township - west

The village of Pleasant City is located in central Valley Township. As well, two unincorporated communities lie in the township: Buffalo in the east, and Derwent at its center.

== Name and history ==
Valley Township was organized in 1815. Statewide, the only other Valley Township is located in Scioto County.

== Government ==
The township is governed by a three-member board of trustees, who are elected in November of odd-numbered years to a four-year term beginning on the following January 1. Two are elected in the year after the presidential election and one is elected in the year before it. There is also an elected township fiscal officer, who serves a four-year term beginning on April 1 of the year after the election, which is held in November of the year before the presidential election. Vacancies in the fiscal officership or on the board of trustees are filled by the remaining trustees.
