= Pleasant City, Ohio =

- Village
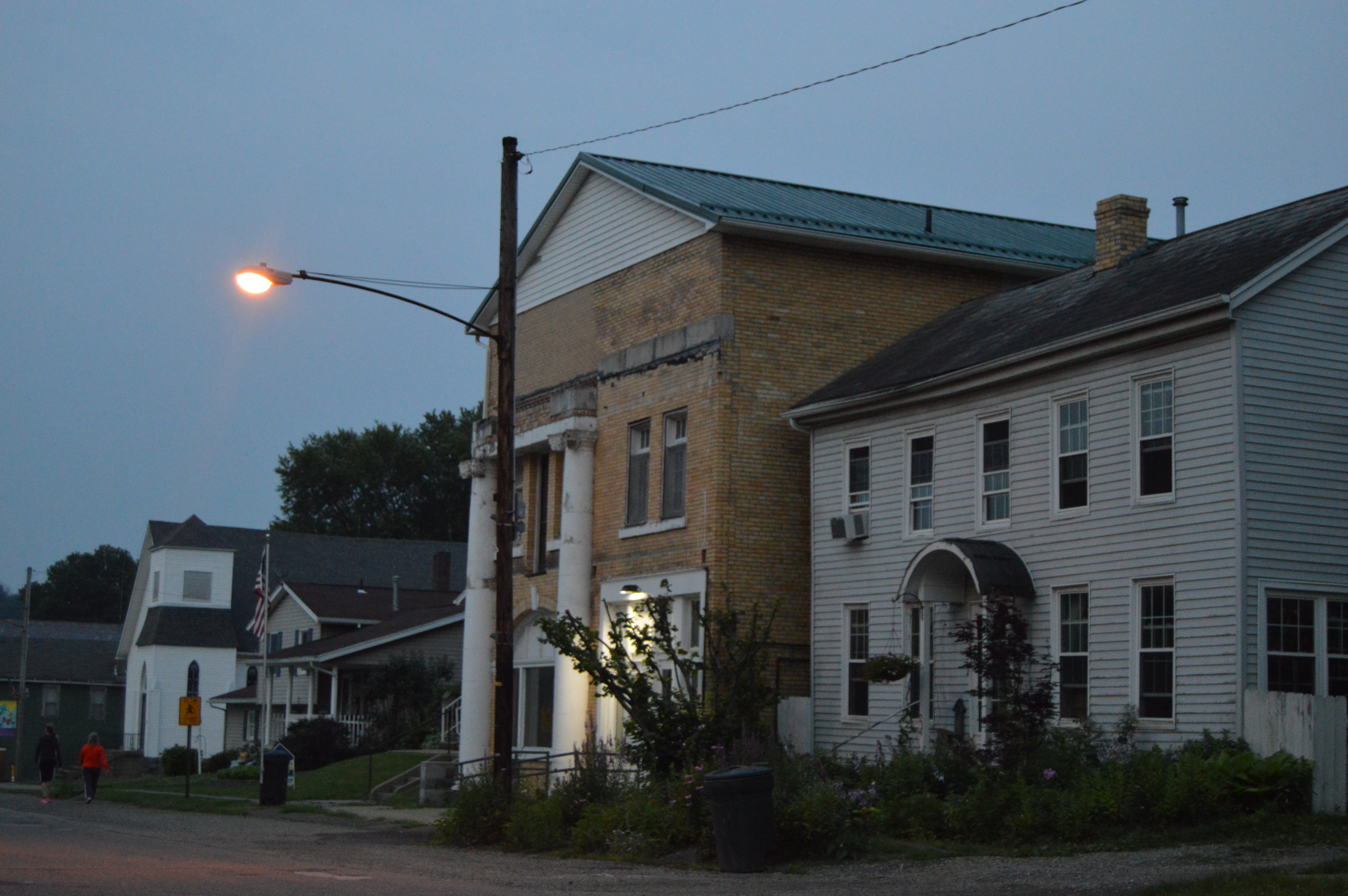
- Main Street

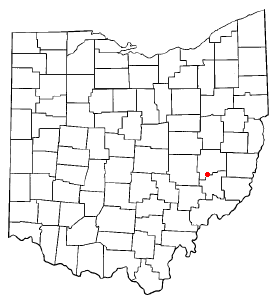
- Location of Pleasant City, Ohio

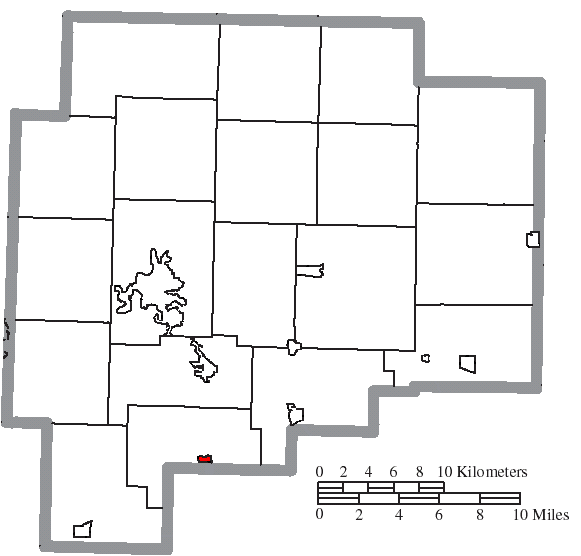
- Location of Pleasant City in Guernsey County
- Coordinates: 39°54′12″N 81°32′38″W
- Country: United States
- State: Ohio
- County: Guernsey
- Township: Valley

Area
  - Total: 0.18 sq mi (0.46 km^{2})
  - Land: 0.18 sq mi (0.46 km^{2})
  - Water: 0 sq mi (0.00 km^{2})
- Elevation: 837 ft (255 m)

Population (2020)
  - Total: 400
  - Density: 2,267.6/sq mi (875.53/km^{2})
- Time zone: UTC-5 (Eastern (EST))
  - Summer (DST): UTC-4 (EDT)
- ZIP code: 43772
- Area code: 740
- FIPS code: 39-63436
- GNIS feature ID: 2399689

Pleasant City is a village in Guernsey County, Ohio, United States. The population was 400 at the 2020 census.

== History ==
Pleasant City was originally called Point Pleasant, and under the latter name was platted in 1829.

== Geography ==
According to the United States Census Bureau, the village has a total area of 0.18 square miles (0.47 km^{2}), all land.

== Demographics ==
Historical population
Census	Pop.	Note	%±
1900	1,006		—
1910	788		−21.7%
1920	781		−0.9%
1930	627		−19.7%
1940	563		−10.2%
1950	511		−9.2%
1960	491		−3.9%
1970	494		0.6%
1980	481		−2.6%
1990	419		−12.9%
2000	439		4.8%
2010	447		1.8%
2020	400		−10.5%
U.S. Decennial Census

=== 2010 census ===
As of the census of 2010, there were 447 people, 166 households, and 112 families living in the village. The population density was 2,483.3 inhabitants per square mile (958.8/km^{2}). There were 187 housing units at an average density of 1,038.9 per square mile (401.1/km^{2}). The racial makeup of the village was 98.0% White, 0.2% Asian, and 1.8% from two or more races. Hispanic or Latino of any race were 1.1% of the population.

There were 166 households, of which 39.8% had children under the age of 18 living with them, 48.2% were married couples living together, 14.5% had a female householder with no husband present, 4.8% had a male householder with no wife present, and 32.5% were non-families. 27.7% of all households were made up of individuals, and 10.8% had someone living alone who was 65 years of age or older. The average household size was 2.69 and the average family size was 3.23.

The median age in the village was 32.5 years. 28% of residents were under the age of 18; 9.4% were between the ages of 18 and 24; 24.6% were from 25 to 44; 27.8% were from 45 to 64; and 10.3% were 65 years of age or older. The gender makeup of the village was 48.3% male and 51.7% female.

=== 2000 census ===
As of the census of 2000, there were 439 people, 175 households, and 120 families living in the village. The population density was 2,365.3 inhabitants per square mile (913.2/km^{2}). There were 197 housing units at an average density of 1,061.4 per square mile (409.8/km^{2}). The racial makeup of the village was 98.41% White, 0.23% African American, and 1.37% from two or more races. Hispanic or Latino of any race were 0.23% of the population.

There were 175 households, out of which 32.6% had children under the age of 18 living with them, 53.1% were married couples living together, 12.0% had a female householder with no husband present, and 30.9% were non-families. 27.4% of all households were made up of individuals, and 10.3% had someone living alone who was 65 years of age or older. The average household size was 2.51 and the average family size was 3.00.

In the village, the population was spread out, with 27.3% under the age of 18, 6.8% from 18 to 24, 26.9% from 25 to 44, 23.0% from 45 to 64, and 15.9% who were 65 years of age or older. The median age was 37 years. For every 100 females there were 80.7 males. For every 100 females age 18 and over, there were 86.5 males.

The median income for a household in the village was $30,769, and the median income for a family was $33,472. Males had a median income of $30,568 versus $19,167 for females. The per capita income for the village was $11,963. About 12.2% of families and 17.2% of the population were below the poverty line, including 30.7% of those under age 18 and 6.7% of those age 65 or over.
