= Wayne Township, Noble County, Ohio =

Township in Ohio, US

- Township
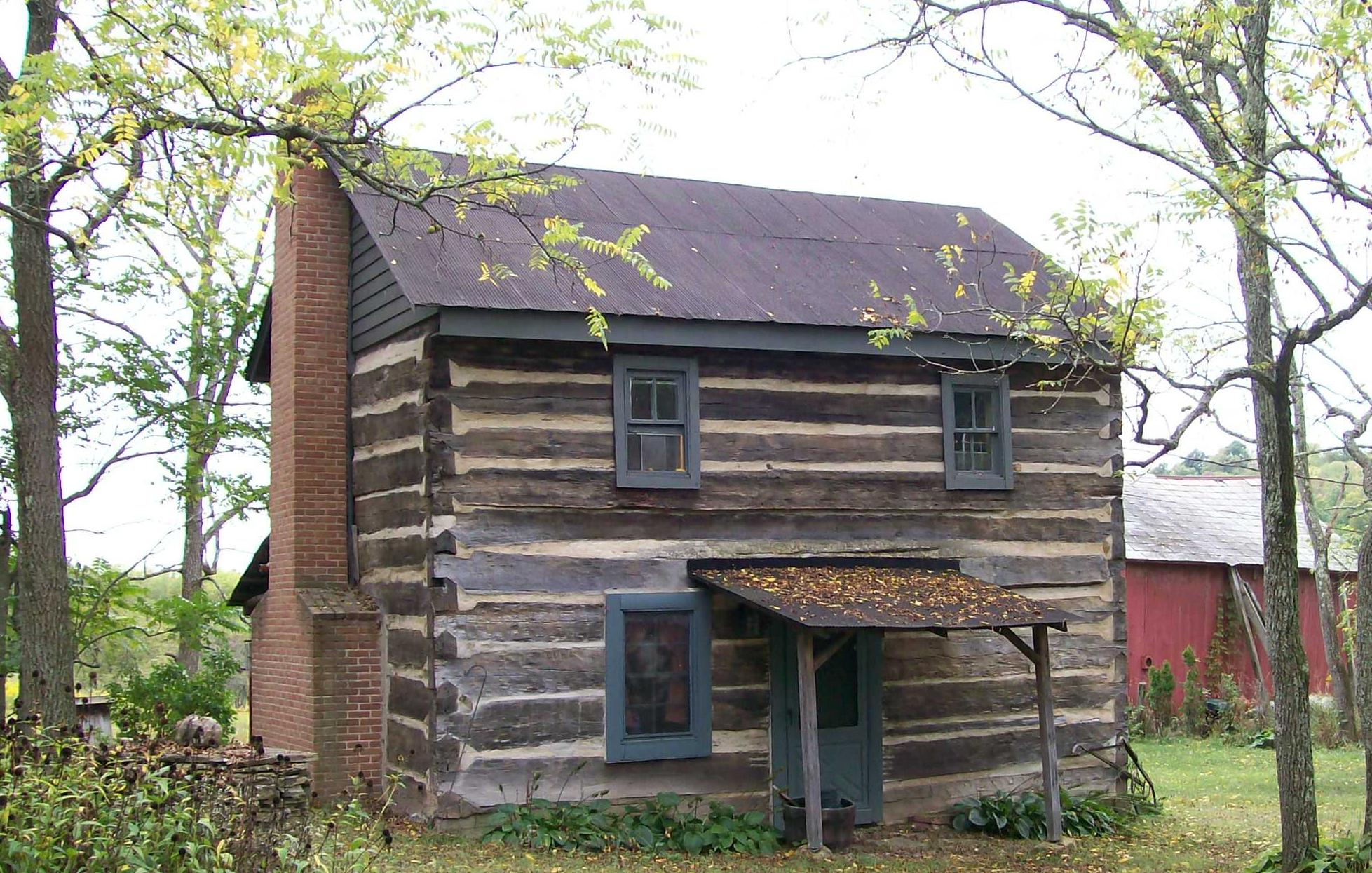
- Abner Williams Log House

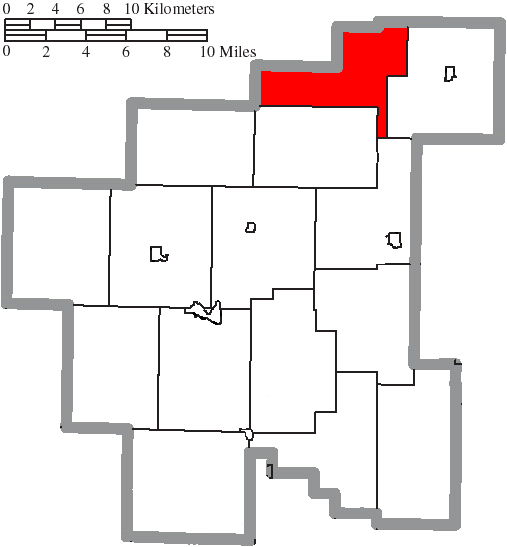
- Location of Wayne Township in Noble County
- Coordinates: 39°54′33″N 81°23′13″W
- Country: United States
- State: Ohio
- County: Noble

Area
  - Total: 21.4 sq mi (55.4 km^{2})
  - Land: 17.9 sq mi (46.4 km^{2})
  - Water: 3.5 sq mi (9.0 km^{2})
- Elevation: 945 ft (288 m)

Population (2020)
  - Total: 479
  - Density: 26.7/sq mi (10.3/km^{2})
- Time zone: UTC-5 (Eastern (EST))
  - Summer (DST): UTC-4 (EDT)
- FIPS code: 39-82250
- GNIS feature ID: 1086753

Wayne Township is one of the fifteen townships of Noble County, Ohio, United States. The 2020 census found 479 people in the township.

== Geography ==
Located in the northern part of the county, it borders the following townships:

- Millwood Township, Guernsey County – northeast
- Beaver Township – east
- Marion Township – southeast
- Seneca Township – south
- Buffalo Township – southwest corner
- Richland Township, Guernsey County – northwest

No municipalities are located in Wayne Township.

== Name and history ==
It is one of twenty Wayne Townships statewide.

== Government ==
The township is governed by a three-member board of trustees, who are elected in November of odd-numbered years to a four-year term beginning on the following January 1. Two are elected in the year after the presidential election and one is elected in the year before it. There is also an elected township fiscal officer, who serves a four-year term beginning on April 1 of the year after the election, which is held in November of the year before the presidential election. Vacancies in the fiscal officership or on the board of trustees are filled by the remaining trustees.
