= Senecaville, Ohio =

- Village
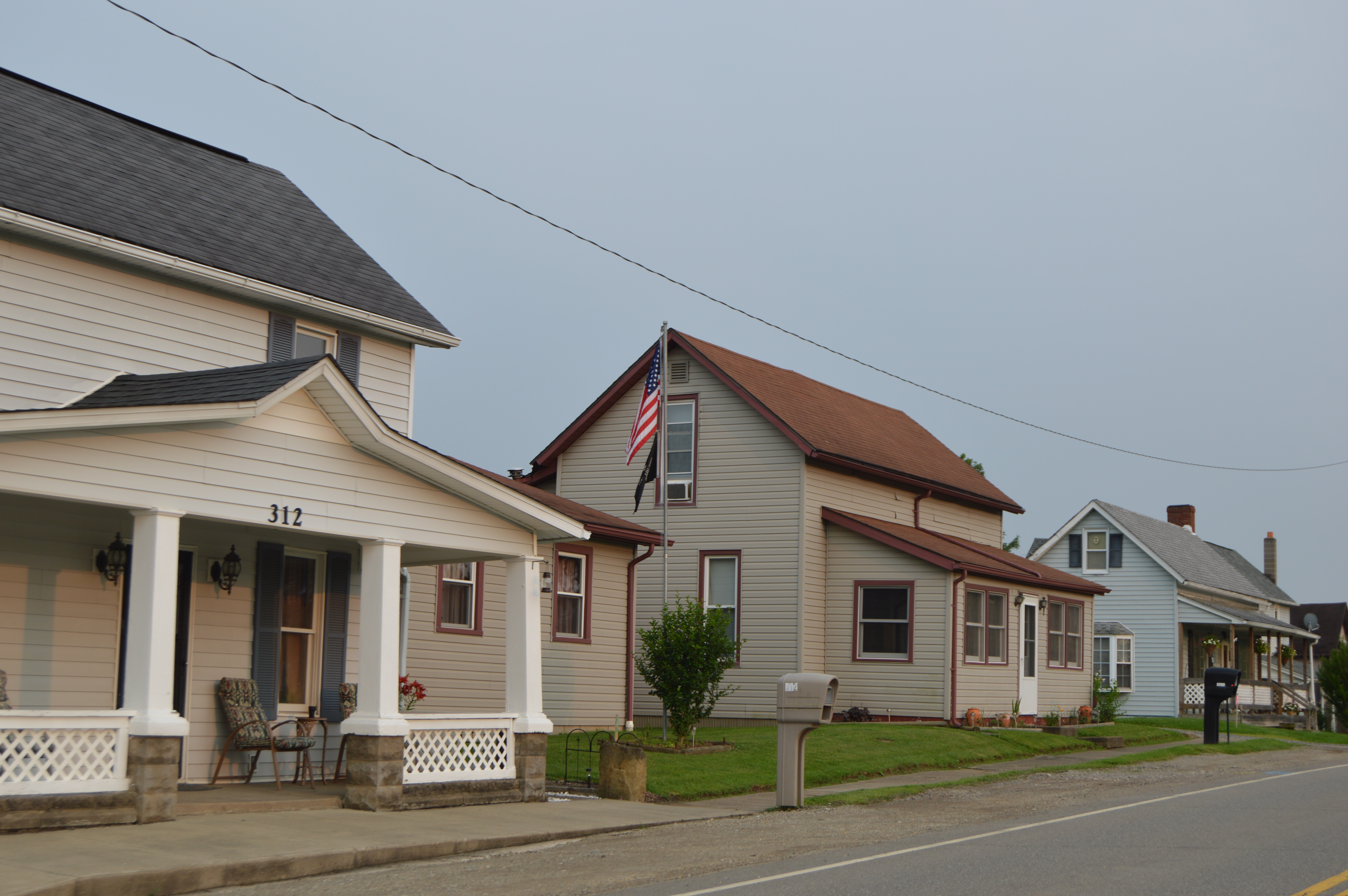
- Houses on High Street

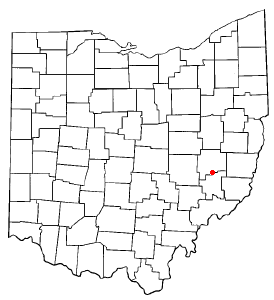
- Location of Senecaville, Ohio

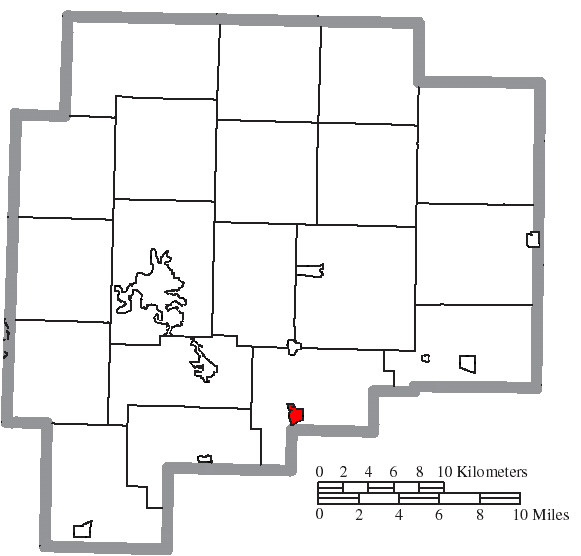
- Location of Senecaville in Guernsey County
- Coordinates: 39°56′05″N 81°27′34″W
- Country: United States
- State: Ohio
- County: Guernsey
- Township: Richland
- Established: 1815

Area
  - Total: 0.47 sq mi (1.23 km^{2})
  - Land: 0.47 sq mi (1.23 km^{2})
  - Water: 0 sq mi (0.00 km^{2})
- Elevation: 814 ft (248 m)

Population (2020)
  - Total: 422
  - Density: 888.4/sq mi (343.03/km^{2})
- Time zone: UTC-5 (Eastern (EST))
  - Summer (DST): UTC-4 (EDT)
- ZIP code: 43780
- Area code: 740
- FIPS code: 39-71360
- GNIS feature ID: 2399786

Senecaville is a village in Guernsey County, Ohio, United States. The population was 422 at the 2020 census.

== History ==
Senecaville was platted in 1815, and named after nearby Seneca Creek. A post office called Senecaville has been in operation since 1823.

== Geography ==
According to the United States Census Bureau, the village has a total area of 0.48 square miles (1.24 km^{2}), all land.

The village of Senecaville is located two miles west of Senecaville Lake. The lake is a man-made reservoir created in 1937 for flood control and water conservation, and is a popular fishing and recreation destination, the third largest lake in Ohio. Senecaville Lake is often referred to as Seneca Lake.

== Demographics ==
Historical population
Census	Pop.	Note	%±
1820	112		—
1840	277		—
1850	457		65.0%
1860	465		1.8%
1870	376		−19.1%
1880	402		6.9%
1890	461		14.7%
1900	623		35.1%
1910	893		43.3%
1920	947		6.0%
1930	993		4.9%
1940	802		−19.2%
1950	586		−26.9%
1960	575		−1.9%
1970	497		−13.6%
1980	458		−7.8%
1990	434		−5.2%
2000	453		4.4%
2010	457		0.9%
2020	422		−7.7%
U.S. Decennial Census

=== 2010 census ===
As of the census of 2010, there were 457 people, 182 households, and 115 families living in the village. The population density was 952.1 inhabitants per square mile (367.6/km^{2}). There were 213 housing units at an average density of 443.8 per square mile (171.4/km^{2}). The racial makeup of the village was 98.9% White, 0.4% Native American, and 0.7% from two or more races.

There were 182 households, of which 33.5% had children under the age of 18 living with them, 45.6% were married couples living together, 13.2% had a female householder with no husband present, 4.4% had a male householder with no wife present, and 36.8% were non-families. 29.1% of all households were made up of individuals, and 10.4% had someone living alone who was 65 years of age or older. The average household size was 2.51 and the average family size was 3.10.

The median age in the village was 39.7 years. 26.9% of residents were under the age of 18; 7.5% were between the ages of 18 and 24; 22.8% were from 25 to 44; 27.7% were from 45 to 64; and 15.3% were 65 years of age or older. The gender makeup of the village was 51.2% male and 48.8% female.

=== 2000 census ===
As of the census of 2000, there were 453 people, 176 households, and 121 families living in the village. The population density was 931.2 inhabitants per square mile (359.5/km^{2}). There were 204 housing units at an average density of 419.4 per square mile (161.9/km^{2}). The racial makeup of the village was 100.00% White.

There were 176 households, out of which 34.7% had children under the age of 18 living with them, 52.8% were married couples living together, 10.2% had a female householder with no husband present, and 30.7% were non-families. 26.7% of all households were made up of individuals, and 11.4% had someone living alone who was 65 years of age or older. The average household size was 2.57 and the average family size was 3.14.

In the village, the population was spread out, with 27.2% under the age of 18, 7.3% from 18 to 24, 31.1% from 25 to 44, 21.4% from 45 to 64, and 13.0% who were 65 years of age or older. The median age was 36 years. For every 100 females there were 85.7 males. For every 100 females age 18 and over, there were 89.7 males.

The median income for a household in the village was $27,813, and the median income for a family was $31,583. Males had a median income of $25,000 versus $17,361 for females. The per capita income for the village was $12,559. About 12.0% of families and 17.2% of the population were below the poverty line, including 26.6% of those under age 18 and 13.4% of those age 65 or over.

== Education ==
Senecaville is within the Rolling Hills School District. Students attend Meadowbrook High School, Meadowbrook Middle School, Brook Intermediate and Secrest Elementary.

== Notable person ==
- Robert T. Secrest, Senator, member of U.S. Congress
