= Cumberland, Ohio =

Village in Guernsey County, Ohio, United States

- Village
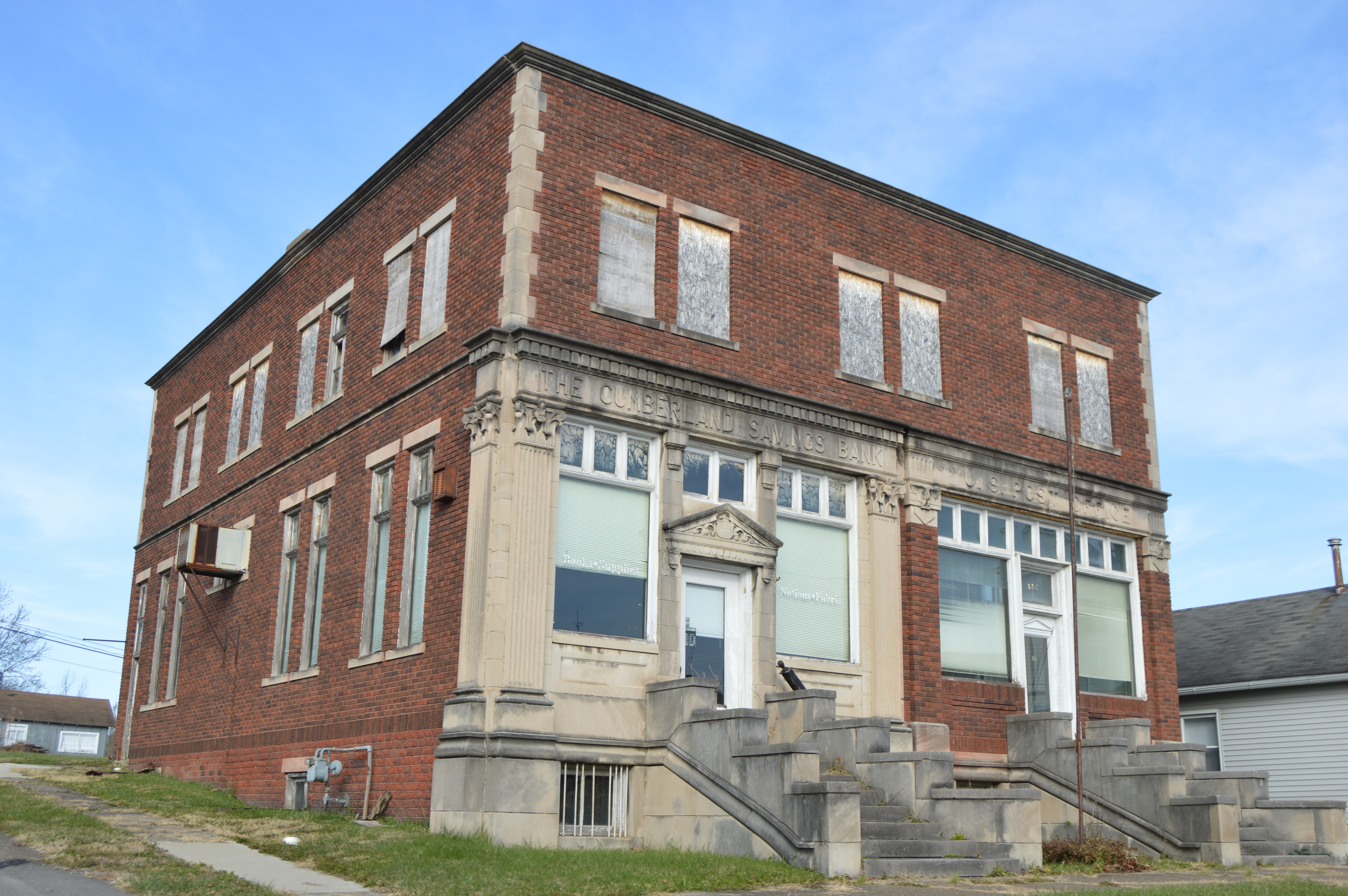
- Former bank and post office

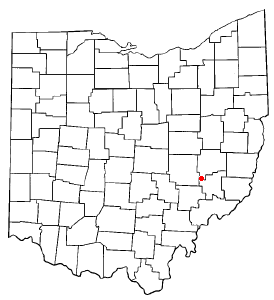
- Location of Cumberland, Ohio

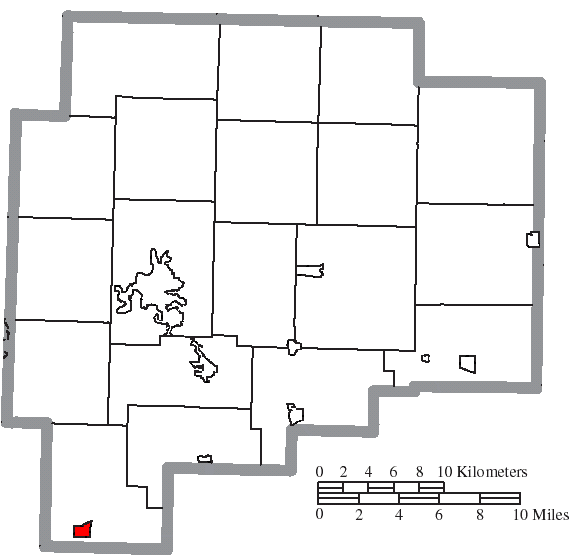
- Location of Cumberland in Guernsey County
- Coordinates: 39°51′12″N 81°39′31″W
- Country: United States
- State: Ohio
- County: Guernsey
- Township: Spencer

Area
  - Total: 0.49 sq mi (1.26 km^{2})
  - Land: 0.49 sq mi (1.26 km^{2})
  - Water: 0 sq mi (0.00 km^{2})
- Elevation: 860 ft (260 m)

Population (2020)
  - Total: 317
  - Estimate (2023): 312
  - Density: 652.8/sq mi (252.04/km^{2})
- Time zone: UTC-5 (Eastern (EST))
  - Summer (DST): UTC-4 (EDT)
- ZIP code: 43732
- Area code: 740
- FIPS code: 39-19694
- GNIS feature ID: 2398659

Cumberland is a village in Guernsey County, Ohio, United States. It is seventy miles east of Columbus. The population was 317 at the 2020 census.

== History ==
Cumberland was platted in 1828. The village most likely was named after the Cumberland Road. A post office has been in operation at Cumberland since 1829.

== Geography ==
According to the United States Census Bureau, the village has a total area of 0.49 square miles (1.27 km^{2}), all land.

== Demographics ==
Historical population
Census	Pop.	Note	%±
1850	431		—
1860	362		−16.0%
1870	319		−11.9%
1880	519		62.7%
1890	601		15.8%
1900	618		2.8%
1910	609		−1.5%
1920	636		4.4%
1930	556		−12.6%
1940	421		−24.3%
1950	537		27.6%
1960	493		−8.2%
1970	463		−6.1%
1980	461		−0.4%
1990	318		−31.0%
2000	402		26.4%
2010	367		−8.7%
2020	317		−13.6%
2023 (est.)	312	▼	−1.6%
U.S. Decennial Census

=== 2010 census ===
As of the census of 2010, there were 367 people, 132 households, and 101 families living in the village. The population density was 749.0 inhabitants per square mile (289.2/km^{2}). There were 155 housing units at an average density of 316.3 per square mile (122.1/km^{2}). The racial makeup of the village was 94.3% White, 2.2% African American, 0.3% Asian, 1.1% from other races, and 2.2% from two or more races. Hispanic or Latino of any race were 1.6% of the population.

There were 132 households, of which 38.6% had children under the age of 18 living with them, 55.3% were married couples living together, 12.9% had a female householder with no husband present, 8.3% had a male householder with no wife present, and 23.5% were non-families. 17.4% of all households were made up of individuals, and 7.6% had someone living alone who was 65 years of age or older. The average household size was 2.78 and the average family size was 3.04.

The median age in the village was 37.6 years. 25.3% of residents were under the age of 18; 9% were between the ages of 18 and 24; 27.5% were from 25 to 44; 23.7% were from 45 to 64; and 14.4% were 65 years of age or older. The gender makeup of the village was 49.0% male and 51.0% female.

=== 2000 census ===
As of the census of 2000, there were 402 people, 145 households, and 109 families living in the village. The population density was 832.0 inhabitants per square mile (321.2/km^{2}). There were 162 housing units at an average density of 335.3 per square mile (129.5/km^{2}). The racial makeup of the village was 99.00% White, 0.50% African American, 0.25% from other races, and 0.25% from two or more races.

There were 145 households, out of which 42.8% had children under the age of 18 living with them, 56.6% were married couples living together, 9.7% had a female householder with no husband present, and 24.8% were non-families. 22.8% of all households were made up of individuals, and 13.1% had someone living alone who was 65 years of age or older. The average household size was 2.77 and the average family size was 3.20.

In the village, the population was spread out, with 32.3% under the age of 18, 6.2% from 18 to 24, 30.8% from 25 to 44, 19.9% from 45 to 64, and 10.7% who were 65 years of age or older. The median age was 34 years. For every 100 females there were 104.1 males. For every 100 females age 18 and over, there were 91.5 males.

The median income for a household in the village was $29,792, and the median income for a family was $30,714. Males had a median income of $25,385 versus $16,500 for females. The per capita income for the village was $11,003. About 14.3% of families and 20.1% of the population were below the poverty line, including 27.7% of those under age 18 and 4.9% of those age 65 or over.
