= Leatherwood Creek (Wills Creek tributary) =

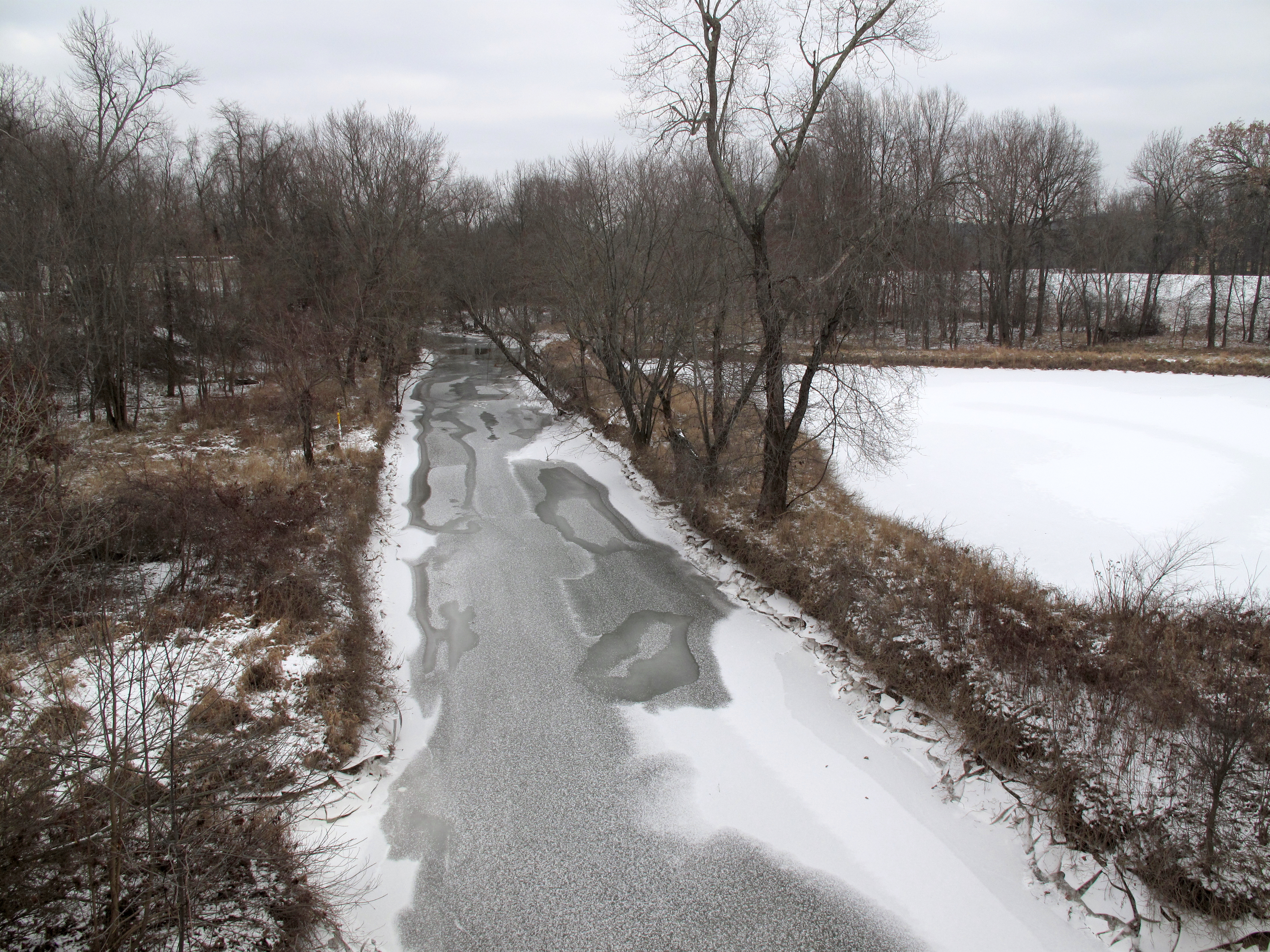
- Leatherwood Creek in Cambridge in December 2010

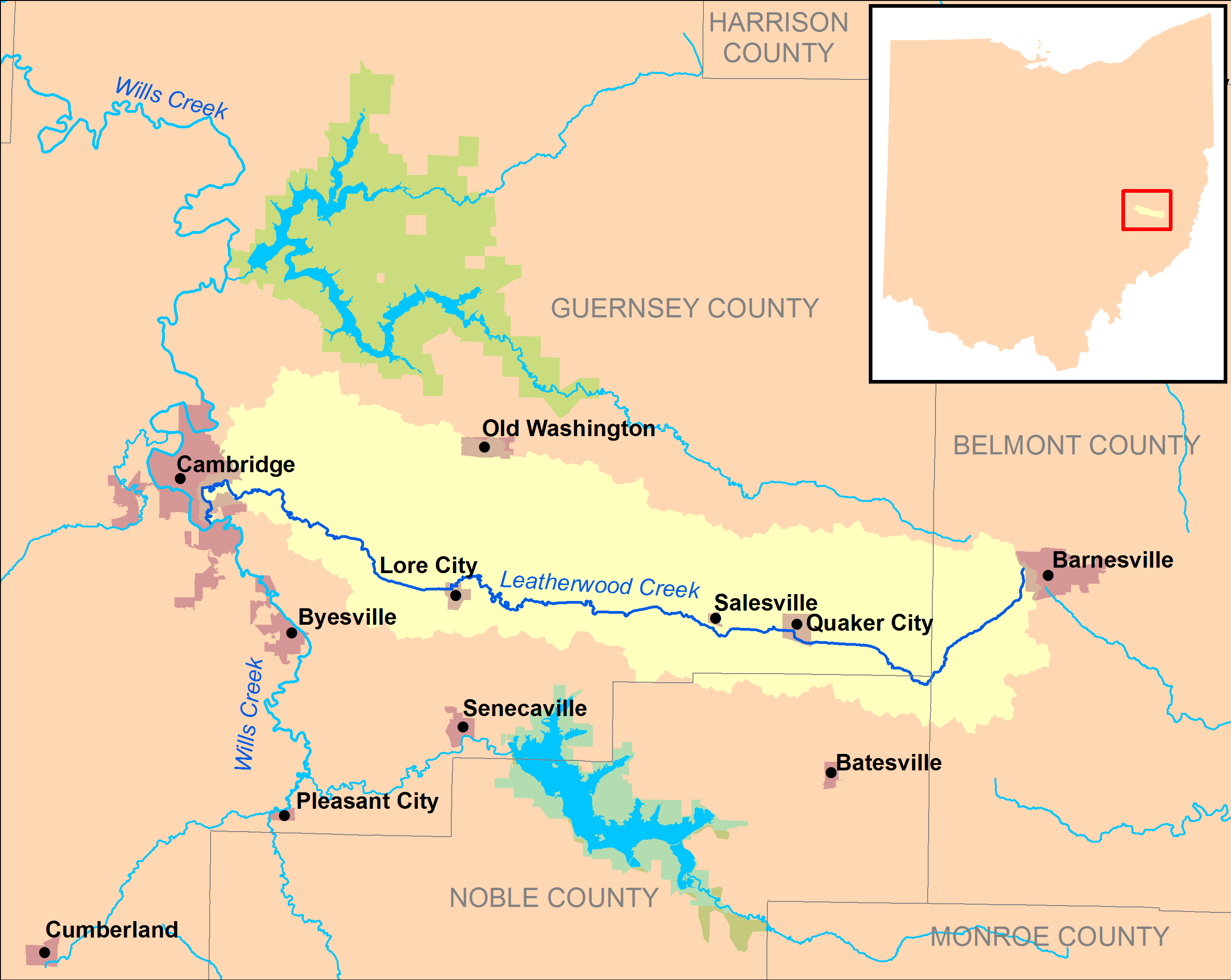
- Leatherwood Creek and its watershed

Location
- Country: United States
- State: Ohio
- Counties: Belmont, Noble, Guernsey
- Municipalities: Quaker City, Salesville, Lore City, Cambridge

Physical characteristics
- Source
  - location: near Barnesville in Warren Township, Belmont County
  - coordinates: 39.9903483°N 81.1892745°W
  - elevation: 1,139 ft (347 m)
- Mouth: Wills Creek
  - location: Cambridge
  - coordinates: 40.0100720°N 81.5767893°W
  - elevation: 778 ft (237 m)
- Length: 28.6 mi (46.0 km)
- Basin size: 91.6 mi^{2} (237 km^{2})
- Discharge
  - location: near Kipling
  - average: 82.9 cu ft/s (2.35 m^{3}/s)
  - minimum: 0 cu ft/s (0 m^{3}/s)
  - maximum: 10,100 cu ft/s (290 m^{3}/s)

Leatherwood Creek is a tributary of Wills Creek, 28.6 miles (46.0 km) long, in eastern Ohio in the United States. Via Wills Creek and the Muskingum and Ohio rivers, it is part of the watershed of the Mississippi River, draining an area of 91.6 square miles (237 km^{2}) on the unglaciated portion of the Allegheny Plateau.

Leatherwood Creek rises just outside the western boundary of the village of Barnesville in Warren Township in Belmont County and flows generally westward, first through a small portion of northeastern Beaver Township in Noble County, and into Guernsey County where it flows through Millwood, Richland, Wills, Center, and Cambridge townships, and through the villages of Quaker City, Salesville, and Lore City. It flows into Wills Creek in the southern part of the city of Cambridge.

Leatherwood Creek was named for the leatherwood which grew along its course.

== Flow rate ==
At the United States Geological Survey's stream gauge near the community of Kipling, the annual mean flow of the creek between 2000 and 2011 was 82.9 cubic feet per second (2.35 m^{3}/s). The highest recorded flow during the period was 10,100 cu ft/s (290 m^{3}/s) on September 18, 2004. A reading of no flow was recorded on September 2, 2003.

== See also ==
- List of rivers of Ohio
- Joseph C. Dylkes, the "Leatherwood God"
