= National Register of Historic Places listings in Guernsey County, Ohio =

Location of Guernsey County in Ohio

This is a list of the National Register of Historic Places listings in Guernsey County, Ohio.

This is intended to be a complete list of the properties and districts on the National Register of Historic Places in Guernsey County, Ohio, United States. The locations of National Register properties and districts for which the latitude and longitude coordinates are included below, may be seen in an online map.

There are 22 properties and districts listed on the National Register in the county, including 1 National Historic Landmark.

This National Park Service list is complete through NPS recent listings posted March 14, 2025.

== Current listings ==
	Name on the Register	Image	Date listed	Location	City or town	Description
1	Barnett-Criss House	Barnett-Criss House	December 8, 1978 (#78002070)	Southwest of Cambridge off U.S. Route 22; 39°59′59″N 81°41′33″W	Westland Township	
2	Berwick Hotel	Berwick Hotel	March 29, 1983 (#83001975)	600-615 Wheeling Ave. 40°01′30″N 81°35′36″W	Cambridge	
3	Bethel Methodist Episcopal Church	Bethel Methodist Episcopal Church	November 24, 1978 (#78002072)	West of Pleasant City on State Route 146; 39°54′04″N 81°35′01″W	Valley Township	
4	Booth Homestead	Booth Homestead	September 6, 1979 (#79001851)	North of Guernsey at 8433 Township Road 838; 40°12′23″N 81°34′37″W	Wheeling Township	
5	Broom Building	Broom Building	February 17, 1983 (#83001976)	701 Wheeling Ave. 40°01′30″N 81°35′31″W	Cambridge	
6	Broom-Braden Stone House	Broom-Braden Stone House	July 18, 1980 (#80003032)	North of Cambridge at 66715 Reed Rd. 40°04′12″N 81°33′31″W	Cambridge Township	
7	Claysville School	Claysville School	February 22, 1979 (#79001850)	North of Claysville on Claysville Rd. 39°56′18″N 81°40′16″W	Westland Township	
8	Ebenezer Finley House	Ebenezer Finley House	February 28, 1986 (#86000417)	East of Buffalo on State Route 313; 39°55′28″N 81°29′37″W	Valley Township	Destroyed
9	Guernsey County Courthouse	Guernsey County Courthouse	July 16, 1973 (#73001452)	Courthouse Sq. 40°01′30″N 81°35′14″W	Cambridge	
10	Samuel Harper Stone House	Samuel Harper Stone House	January 3, 1980 (#80003033)	North of New Concord on Peters Creek Rd. 40°02′00″N 81°43′12″W	Adams Township	
11	Kennedy Stone House	Kennedy Stone House	October 3, 1975 (#75001412)	Southeast of North Salem in Salt Fork State Park; 40°07′41″N 81°29′59″W	Jefferson Township	
12	McCracken-McFarland House	McCracken-McFarland House	February 16, 1979 (#79001848)	216 N. 8th St. 40°01′36″N 81°35′24″W	Cambridge	
13	McCracken-Scott House	McCracken-Scott House	December 20, 1978 (#78002071)	819 Steubenville Ave. 40°01′35″N 81°35′22″W	Cambridge	
14	McCreary-Burnworth House	McCreary-Burnworth House	March 12, 1982 (#82003574)	220 Highland Ave. 40°01′34″N 81°34′53″W	Cambridge	
15	National Road	National Road	August 23, 1985 (#85001842)	Township Road 650, east of Cambridge; 40°01′37″N 81°30′09″W	Center Township	
16	Old Washington Historic District	Old Washington Historic District	May 29, 1975 (#75001413)	Both sides of Main St. 40°02′18″N 81°26′35″W	Old Washington	
17	S Bridge, National Road	S Bridge, National Road	October 15, 1966 (#66000610)	4 mi (6.4 km) east of Old Washington on U.S. Route 40; 40°02′43″N 81°22′27″W	Wills Township	
18	Peter B. Sarchet House	Peter B. Sarchet House	February 22, 1979 (#79001849)	North of Cambridge on Oldham Rd. 40°05′02″N 81°35′13″W	Cambridge Township	
19	Sarchet-Burgess House	Sarchet-Burgess House	May 21, 1987 (#87000808)	145 W. 8th St. 40°01′33″N 81°35′26″W	Cambridge	
20	Matthew Scott House		April 17, 2023 (#100008837)	210 Fair Ave. 40°03′23″N 81°13′53″W	Fairview	
21	Colonel Joseph Taylor House	Colonel Joseph Taylor House	August 29, 2008 (#08000801)	633 Upland Rd. 40°02′00″N 81°35′33″W	Cambridge	
22	Wheeling Avenue Historic District	Wheeling Avenue Historic District	May 11, 1987 (#87000919)	Roughly bounded by Steubenville, 10th, Wheeling, and 4th Aves. 40°01′29″N 81°35′27″W	Cambridge	

== See also ==
- List of National Historic Landmarks in Ohio
- Listings in neighboring counties: Belmont, Coshocton, Harrison, Muskingum, Noble, Tuscarawas
- National Register of Historic Places listings in Ohio
