= Ohio State Route 265 =

State highway in eastern Ohio, US

State Route 265

Route information
- Maintained by ODOT
- Length: 18.33 mi (29.50 km)
- Existed: 1927–present

Major junctions
- West end: US 40 near Cambridge
- East end: SR 147 near Barnesville

Location
- Country: United States
- State: Ohio
- Counties: Guernsey, Noble, Belmont

Highway system
- Ohio State Highway System; Interstate; US; State; Scenic
← SR 264	→ SR 266

State Route 265 (SR 265) is an 18.33-mile-long (29.50 km) east–west state highway in the eastern portion of the U.S. state of Ohio. The western terminus of SR 265 is at its junction with US 40 approximately 2.50 miles (4.02 km) east of the city limits of Cambridge. The highway's eastern terminus is at a T-intersection with SR 147 nearly 3 miles (4.8 km) southwest of Barnesville.

== Route description ==
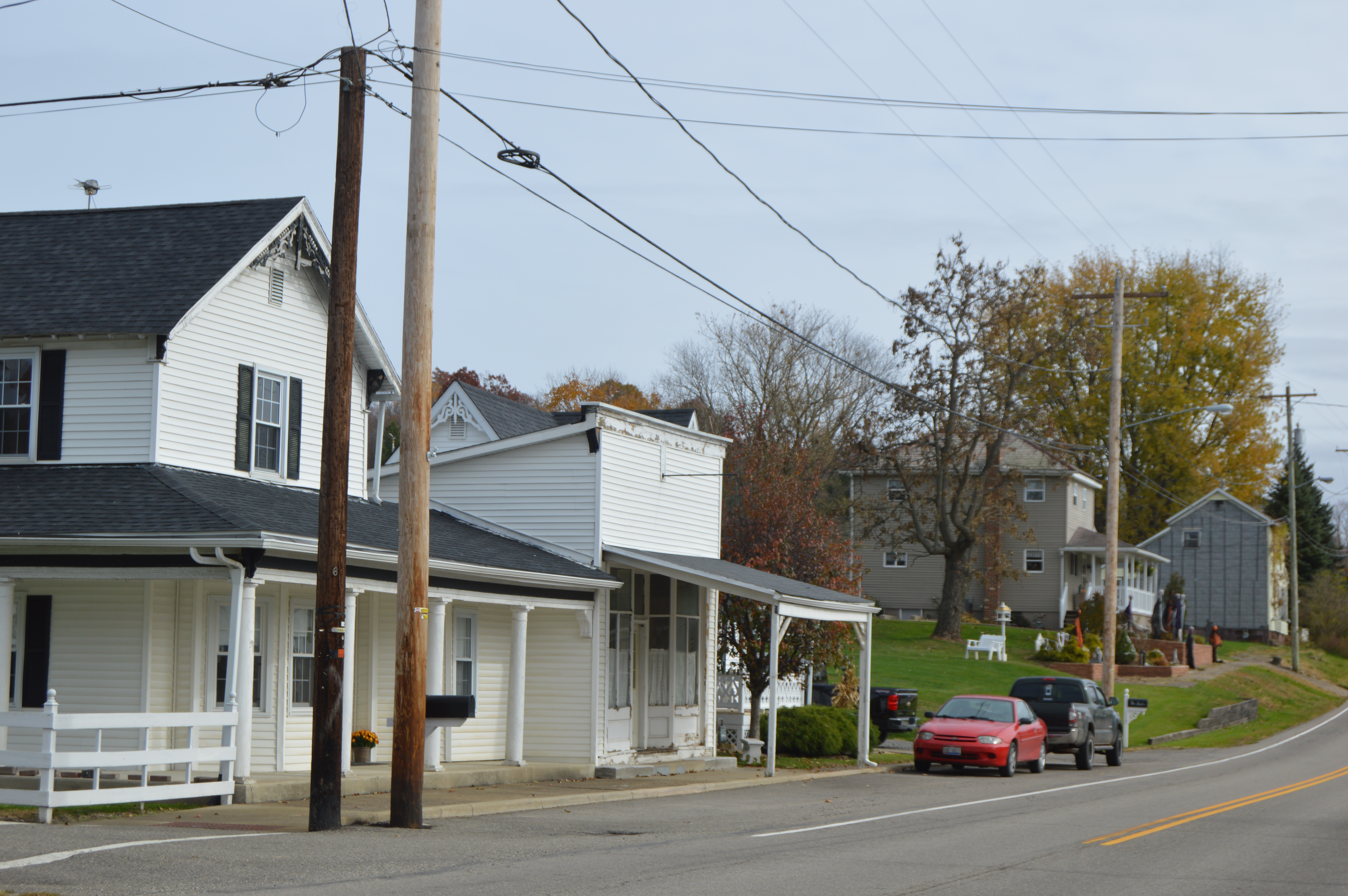
SR 265 in Salesville

The path of SR 265 takes it through the eastern half of Guernsey County, the northeasternmost portion of Noble County and just into the southwestern corner of Belmont County. No part of this highway is included within the National Highway System (NHS). The NHS is a system of routes determined to be most important for the economy, mobility and defense of the nation.

== History ==
SR 265 was established in 1927. The designation was applied to a stretch of roadway that was formerly a portion of SR 148. It has maintained the same routing through portions of Guernsey, Noble and Belmont Counties throughout its history.

== Major intersections ==
County	Location	mi	km	Destinations	Notes
Guernsey	Center Township	0.00	0.00	US 40 – Cambridge	
Guernsey	Center Township	4.58	7.37	SR 285 – Lore City, Senecaville, Old Washington	
Guernsey	Salesville	11.54	18.57	SR 761 south	Northern terminus of SR 761
Guernsey	Quaker City	13.77	22.16	SR 513 (Pike Street) to I-70	
Noble	No major junctions				
Guernsey	No major junctions				
Belmont	Warren Township	18.33	29.50	SR 147 – Sarahsville, Barnesville	
1.000 mi = 1.609 km; 1.000 km = 0.621 mi
