= Millwood Township =

Millwood Township may refer to the following townships in the United States:

- Millwood Township, Stearns County, Minnesota
- Millwood Township, Lincoln County, Missouri (inactive)
- Millwood Township, Guernsey County, Ohio
