= Salesville =

Salesville may refer to some places in the United States:

- Salesville, Arkansas
- Salesville, Ohio
