= Kings Mine, Ohio =

- Unincorporated community
- Location within Ohio Location within the United States
- Coordinates: 39°59′24″N 81°29′04″W
- Country: United States
- State: Ohio
- County: Guernsey
- Township: Center

Area
  - Water: 0 sq mi (0.0 km^{2})
- Elevation: 856 ft (261 m)
- Time zone: UTC-5 (Eastern (EST))
  - Summer (DST): UTC-4 (EDT)
- GNIS feature ID: 1079581

Kings Mine is an unincorporated community and coal town in southwestern Center Township, Guernsey County, Ohio, United States. It was also called Guild.
