= Kipling, Ohio =

- Unincorporated community
- Location within Ohio Location within the United States
- Coordinates: 39°59′46″N 81°30′2″W
- Country: United States
- State: Ohio
- County: Guernsey
- Township: Center

Area
  - Water: 0 sq mi (0.0 km^{2})
- Elevation: 820 ft (250 m)
- Time zone: UTC-5 (Eastern (EST))
  - Summer (DST): UTC-4 (EDT)
- ZIP code: 43750
- GNIS feature ID: 1064945

Kipling is an unincorporated community and coal town in southwestern Center Township, Guernsey County, Ohio, United States. It lies along State Route 265.

== History ==
The community was named after Rudyard Kipling, the British author.
