= National Road (Cambridge, Ohio) =

- U.S. National Register of Historic Places
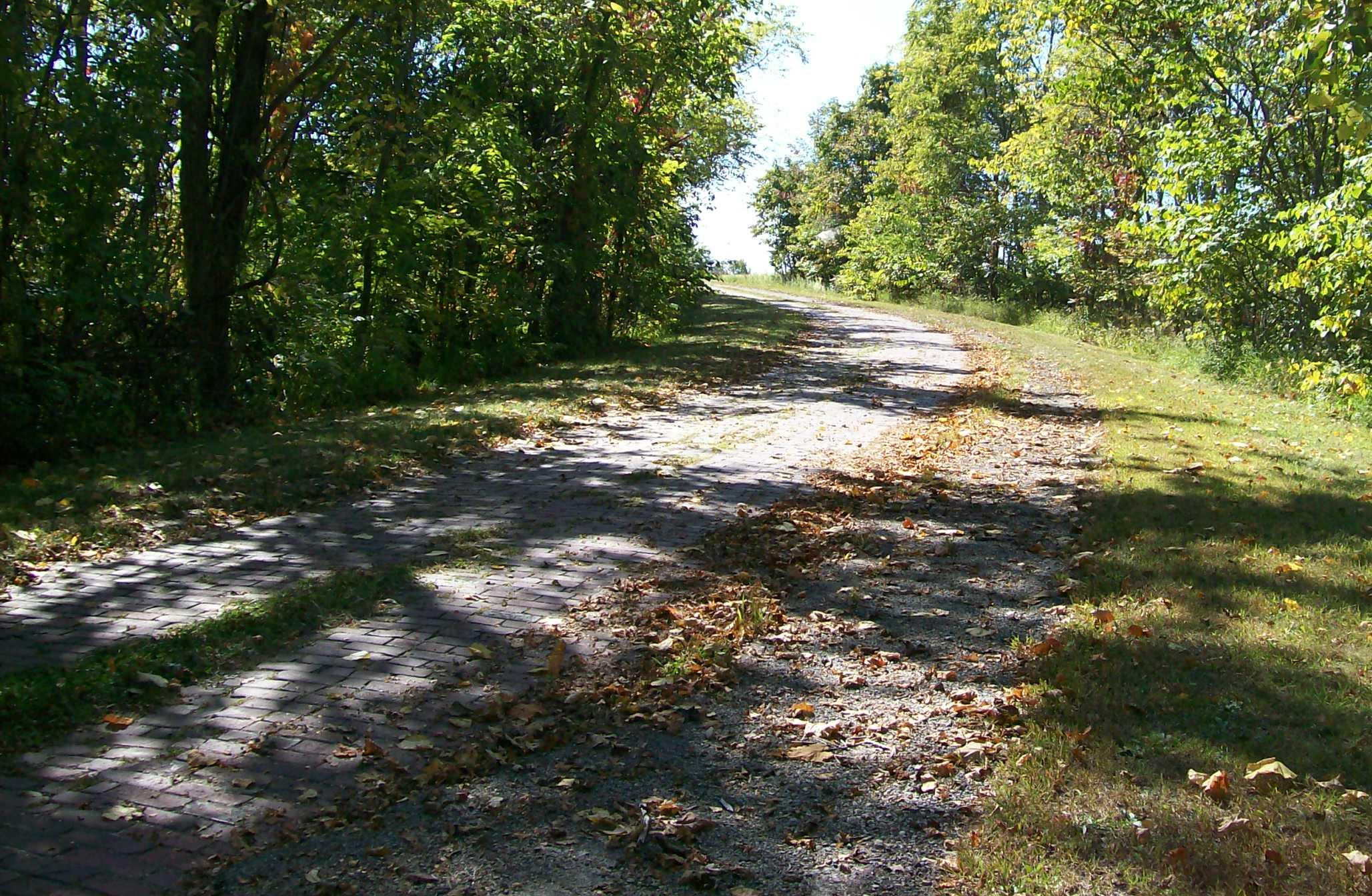
- Peacock Road, aka Old National Road

- Location within Ohio Location within the United States
- Nearest city: Cambridge, Ohio
- Coordinates: 40°1′37″N 81°30′9″W
- Area: less than one acre
- Built: 1918
- Architect: State of Ohio
- NRHP reference No.: 85001842
- Added to NRHP: August 23, 1985

National Road, also known as Peacock Road, is located off of U.S. Route 40 between Cambridge and Old Washington, Ohio. The road was placed on the National Register on 1985-08-23.

== History ==
The National Road was authorized by President Thomas Jefferson on March 29, 1806 and reached out to Pittsburgh, Pennsylvania. The road was later expanded to stretch to Jefferson City, Missouri. The road closely followed Zane's Trace, an earlier path, and came through the Guernsey County area around 1838.

The road currently known as Peacock Road contains original brick sections of 1918 construction. However, due to costs, parts of the road were left unpaved until World War II, when the road was used for war shipment. Local inmates were used as a cost saving method to brick up the sections. When Route 40 was diverted north of this section, the old road was unknowingly saved for posterity.

== Peacock Road ==
Part of the National Road in Center Township retains its early twentieth-century appearance. Virtually no changes have been made since the 1920s, including the pavement; the bricks laid in 1918 remain in place. This section of the road runs approximately east-west between Old Washington and Cambridge, a distance of 5 miles (8.0 km).
