= Opperman, Ohio =

- Unincorporated community
- Location within Ohio Location within the United States
- Coordinates: 39°53′26″N 81°36′2″W
- Country: United States
- State: Ohio
- County: Guernsey
- Township: Valley

Area
  - Water: 0 sq mi (0.0 km^{2})
- Elevation: 837 ft (255 m)
- Time zone: UTC-5 (Eastern (EST))
  - Summer (DST): UTC-4 (EDT)
- GNIS feature ID: 1049039

Opperman is an unincorporated community and coal town in southwestern Guernsey County, Ohio, United States. Its post office is closed.

== History ==
Opperman was planted by Thomas Moore and his wife on August 28, 1903. The town flourished while the mines were being operated. The village once had a railroad station, stores, schools and homes, but nearly all have disappeared.
