= Mansel Carter =

American businessman and prospector (1902–1987)

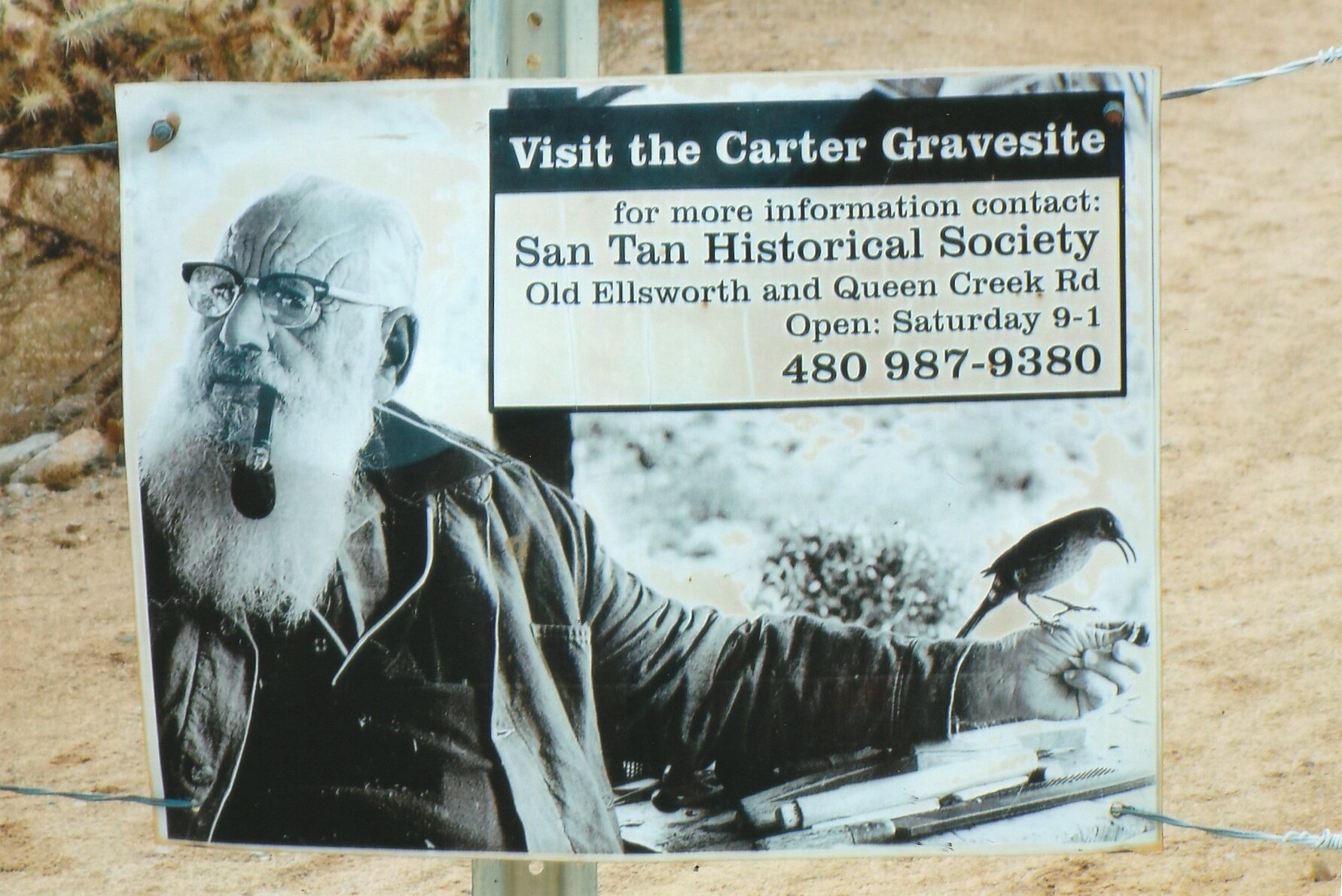
- Mansel Carter gravesite marker in San Tan Mountain Regional Park.
- Born: May 12, 1902; Quaker City, Ohio
- Died: June 5, 1987 (aged 85); Queen Creek, Arizona
- Occupations: Prospector, Mountain Man

Mansel Carter (May 12, 1902 – June 5, 1987), also known as "Man of the Mountain", was an American businessman and prospector. In 1987, The Phoenix named him one of "Arizona Legends". The San Tan Historical Society of Queen Creek recognized his gravesite at Gold Mountain in the San Tan Mountain Regional Park in Queen Creek, Arizona as a tourist attraction. In 2017, the town of Queen Creek named a new community park the "Mansel Carter Oasis Park" in his honor. He prospected for gold in the San Tan Mountains with his partner Marion E. Kennedy, and later handcarved and sold "cactus curios".

== Early years ==
Carter was born in Quaker City, Ohio. When he was young, he studied photography and worked as a mechanic in his hometown. He moved to Indiana and purchased an airplane with which he provided a shuttle service. During the Great Depression, he worked as a lumberjack on the Zuni Indian Reservation.

== Marion E. Kennedy ==
In 1941, Carter moved to the town of Gilbert, Arizona, and opened a photography shop. He was drafted by the United States Army during World War II and served a short tour of duty. He was eventually discharged on account of his age. He met and befriended Marion E. Kennedy (1874–1960), a Cherokee Indian from Oklahoma whose job was delivering ice. Kennedy had at one time attended the Indian School in Carlisle, Pennsylvania, where he studied geology.

== Gold prospecting ==
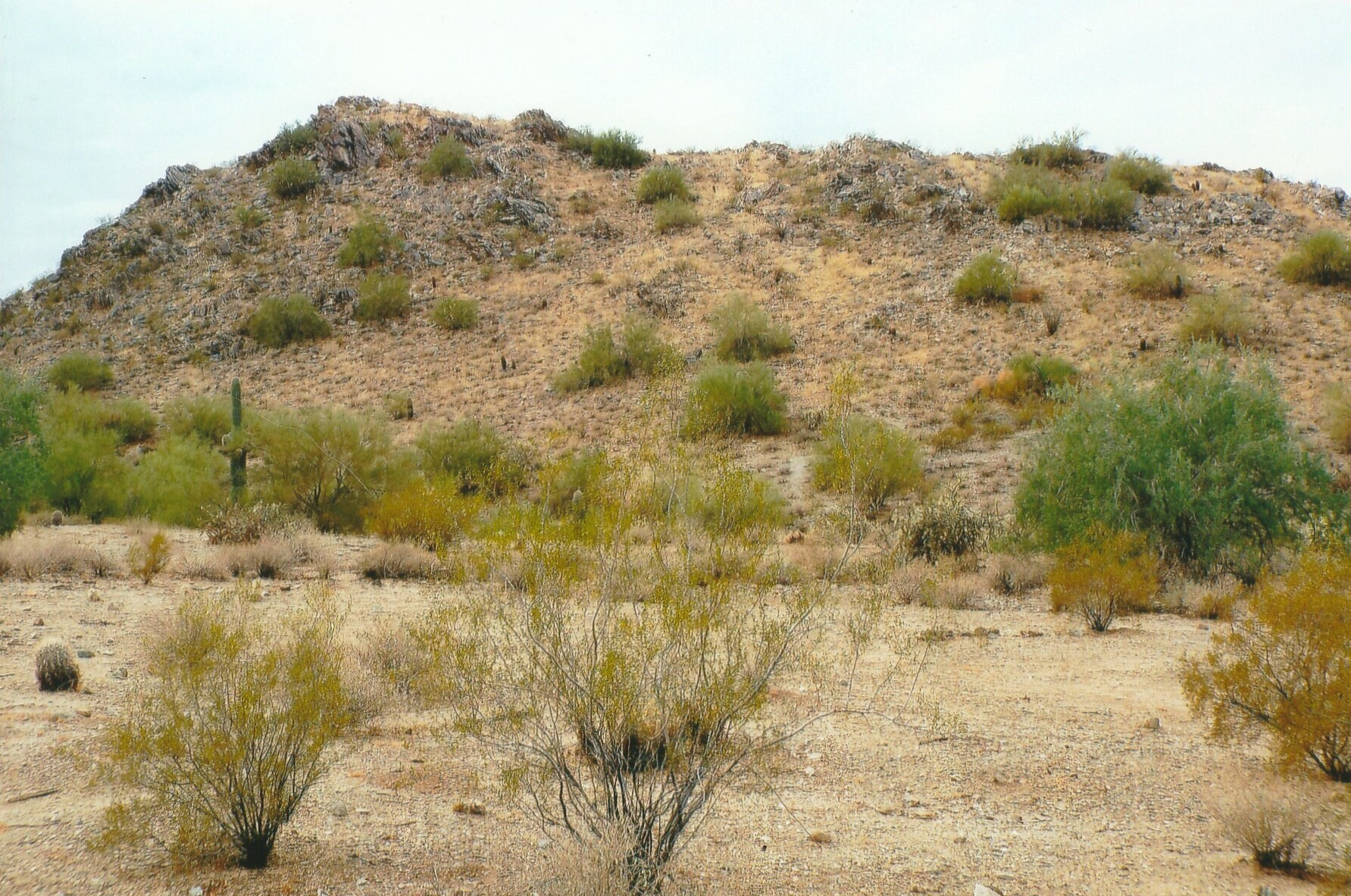
Gold Mountain

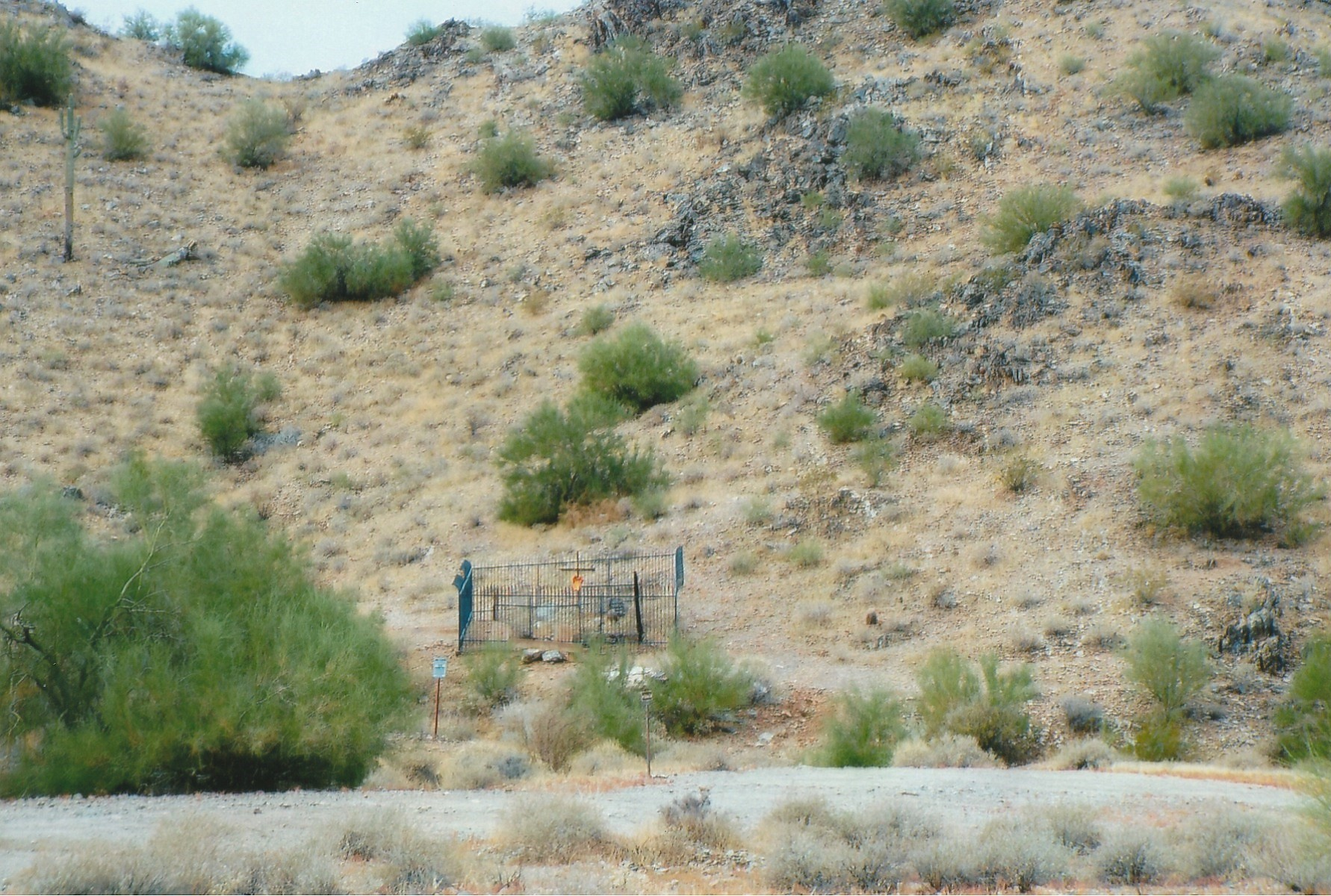
Gravesite of Mansel Carter and Marion E. Kennedy with the Gold Mountain in the background.

Carter received a monthly pension from the military. Both Carter and Kennedy decided to try their hands as gold prospectors and moved to the San Tan Mountains in the town of Queen Creek. The mountain men, as they became known, established various claims, and their campsite became their home. Kennedy taught Carter how to drill for gold, and they became life-long friends. When Kennedy died in 1960, Carter buried him near their campsite.

Carter discontinued prospecting for gold after the death of his friend. He handcarved and sold "cactus curios" to the many visitors from different parts of the country. Carter was featured in "Arizona Road" with Bill Leverton. He kept a guest book, which along with some of his cactus curios and many of his personal belongings, were donated to the San Tan Historical Society's Museum after he died in 1987 of cancer. That same year The Phoenix named him an "Arizona Legend".

Both Carter and Kennedy are buried where their campsite was located near the Goldmine Trail. Their gravesite is considered a historical tourist attraction by the San Tan Historical Society of Queen Creek. The mountain in which they prospected is known as the Gold Mountain and the area is now part of the San Tan Mountain Regional Park system. In 2017, the town of Queen Creek named a new community park the "Mansel Carter Oasis Park".

== Gallery ==
San Tan Mountain Regional Park

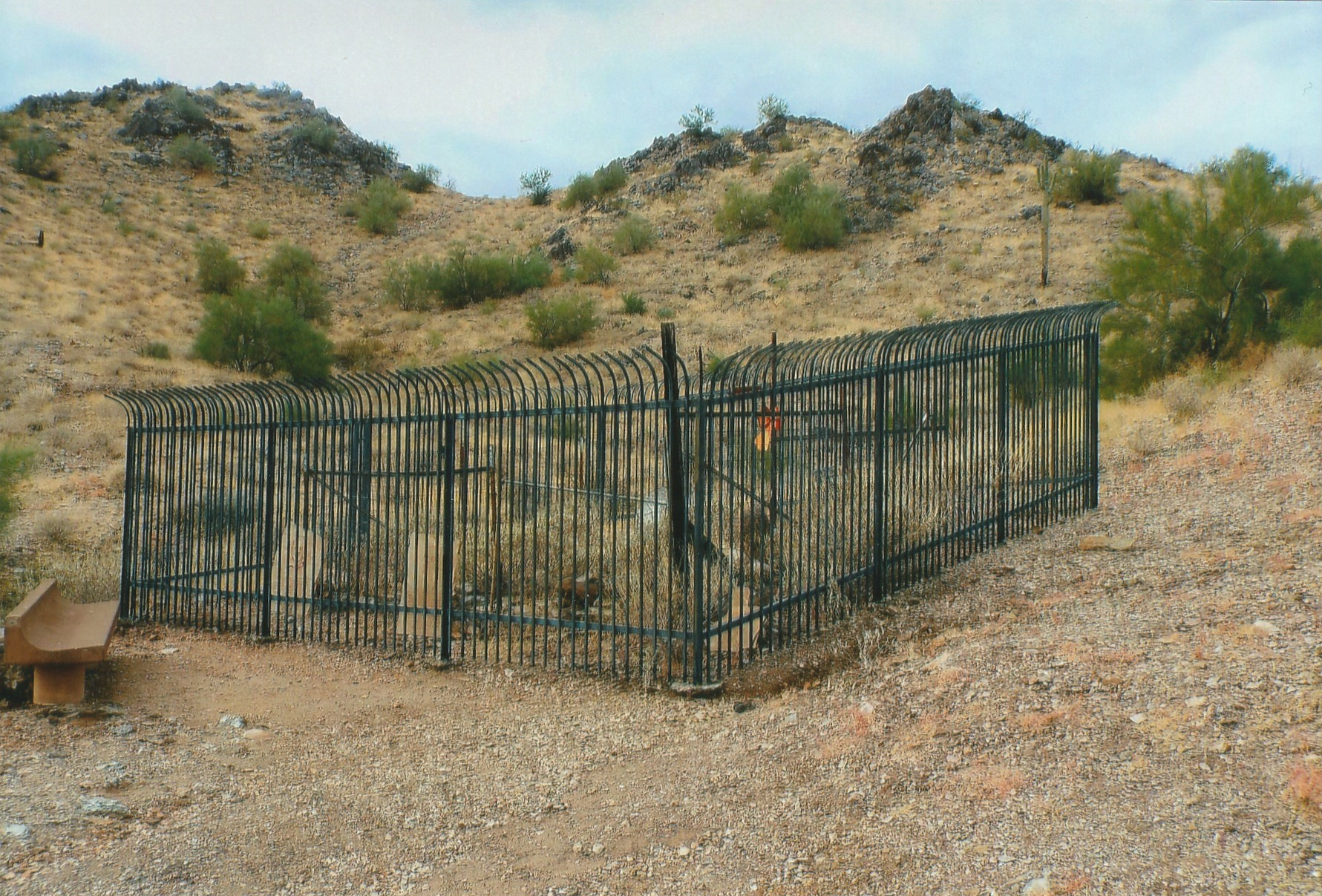
Gravesite of Mansel Carter and Marion E. Kennedy.

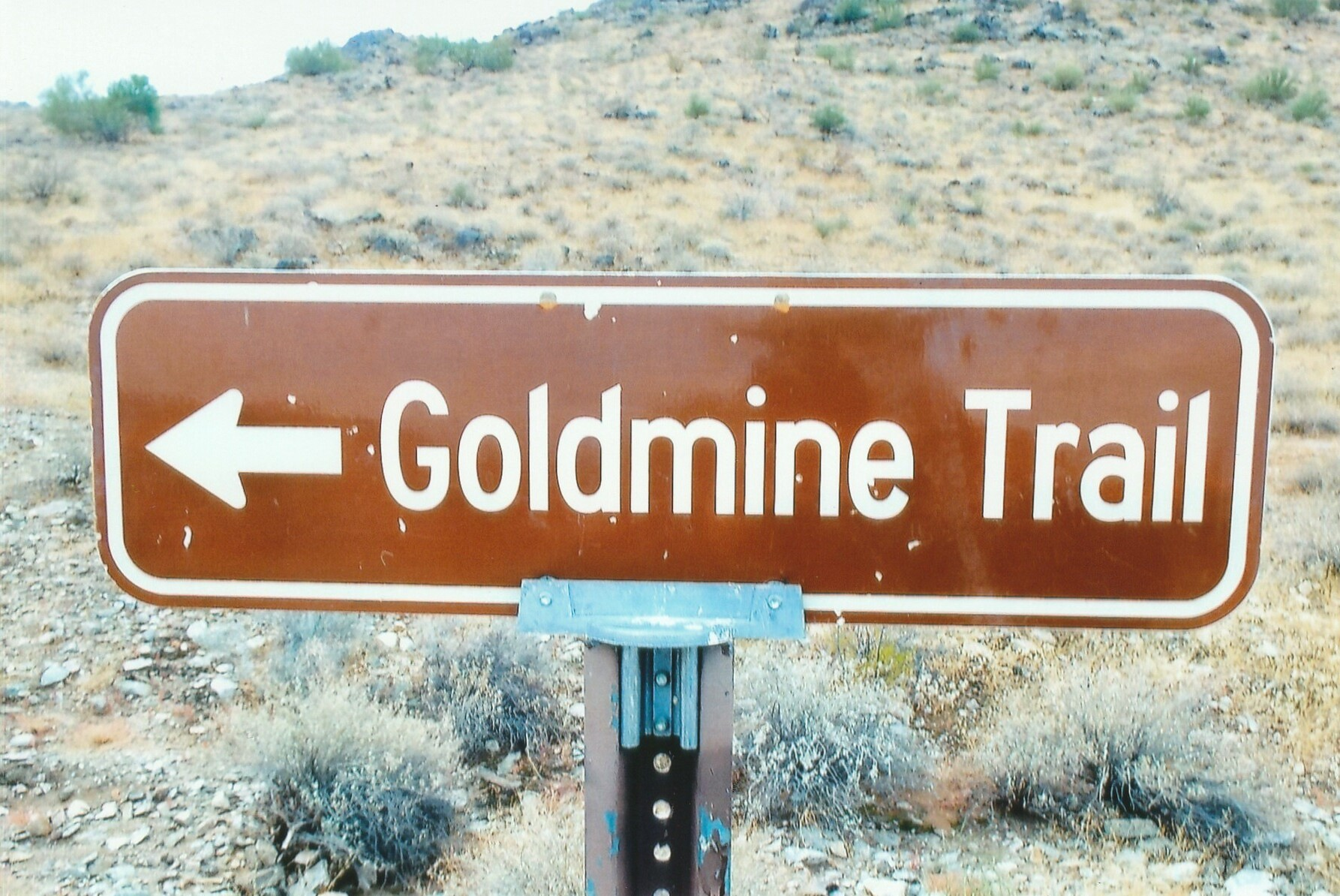
Goldmine Trail sign.

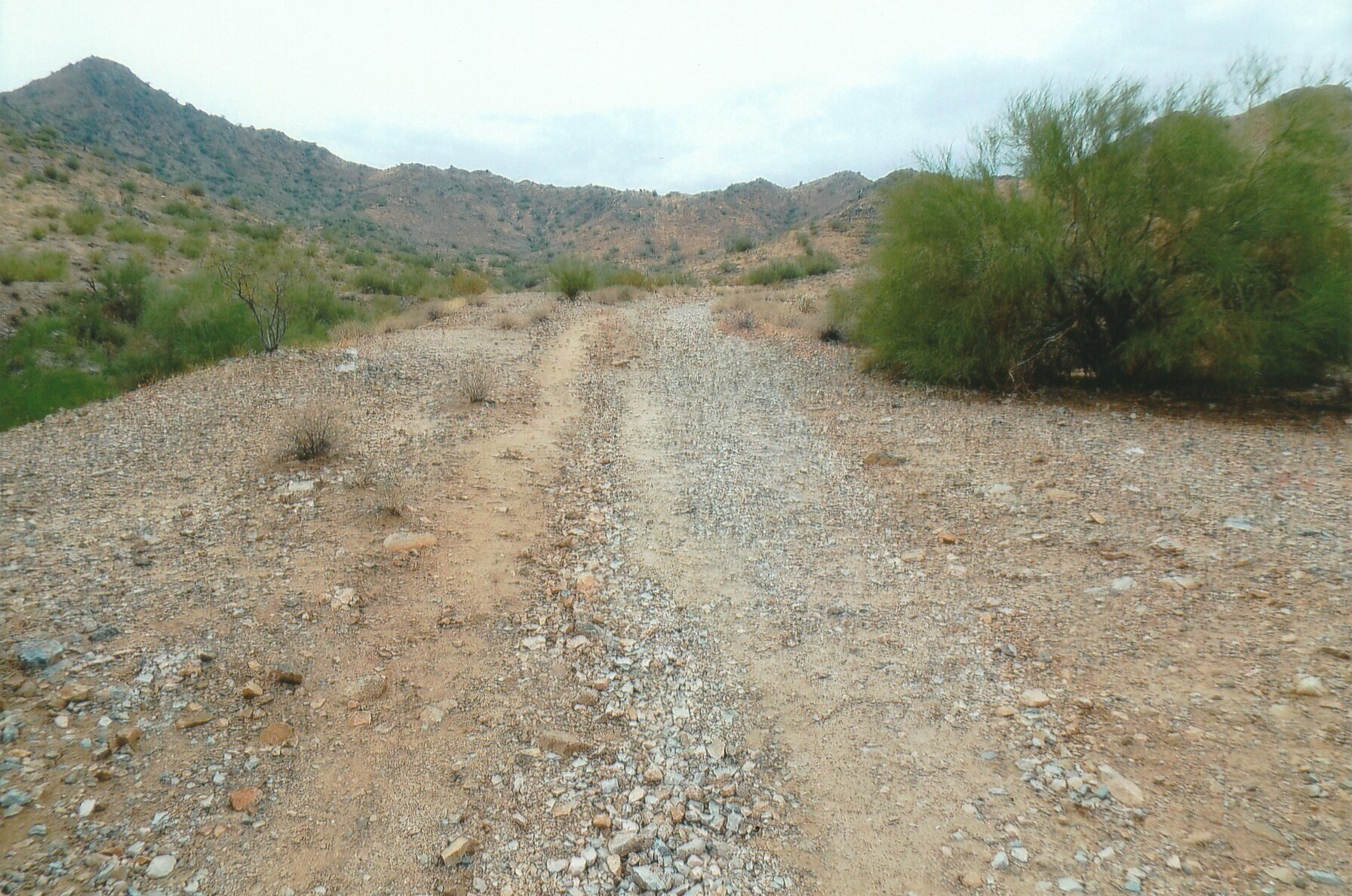
The Goldmine Trail.

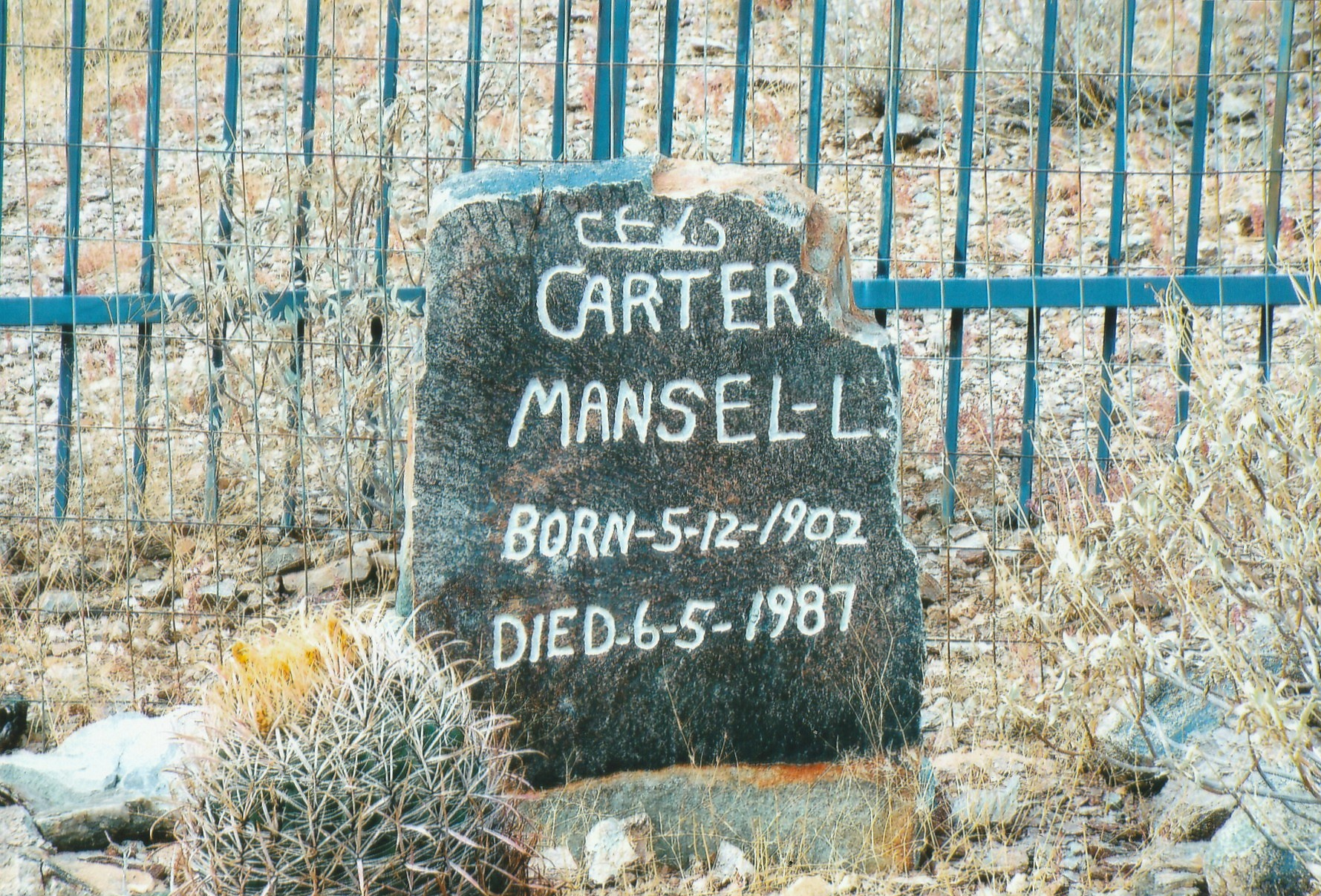
Tombstone of Mansel Carter (1902–1987).

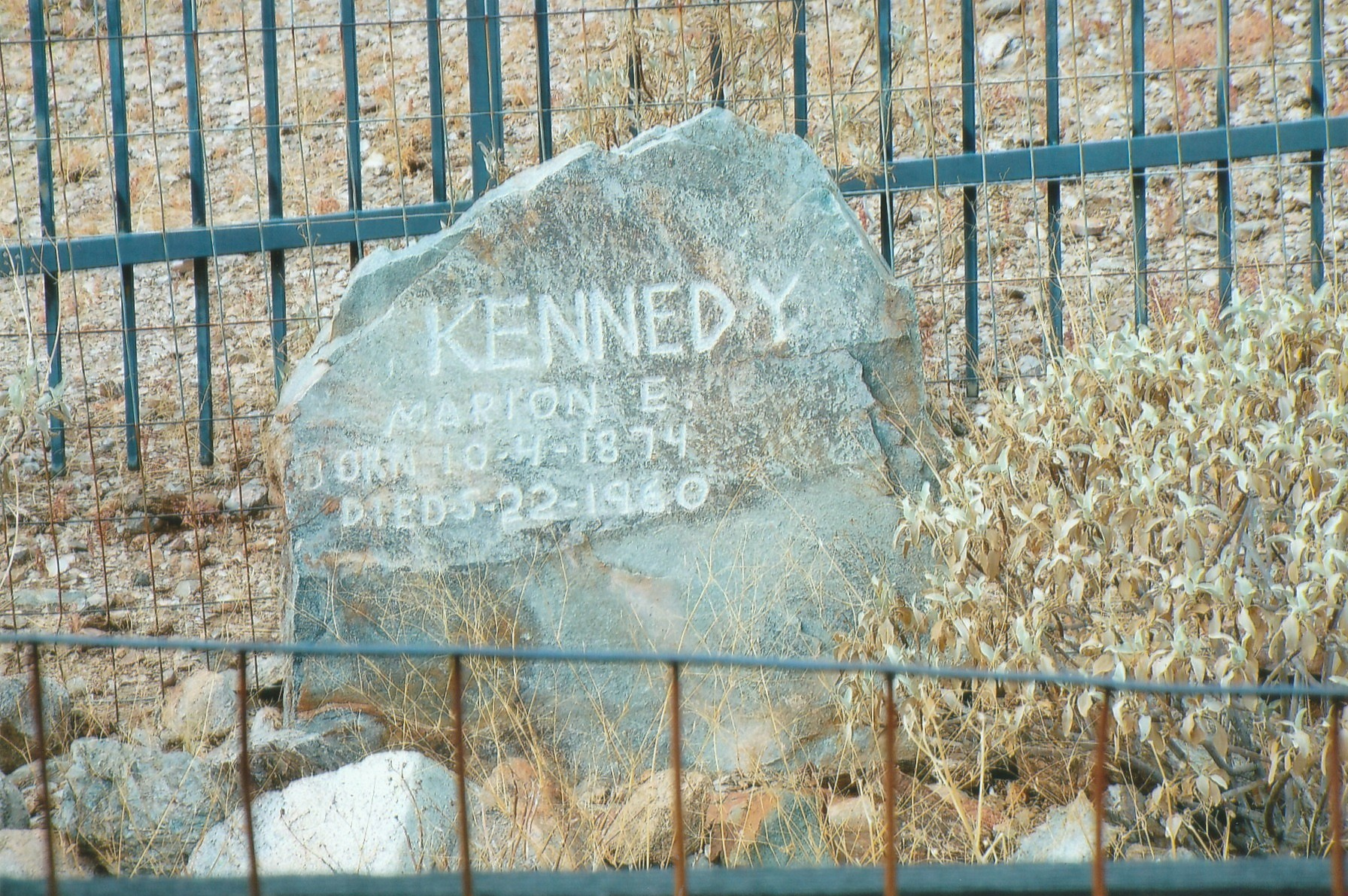
Tombstone of Marion E. Kennedy (1874–1960)

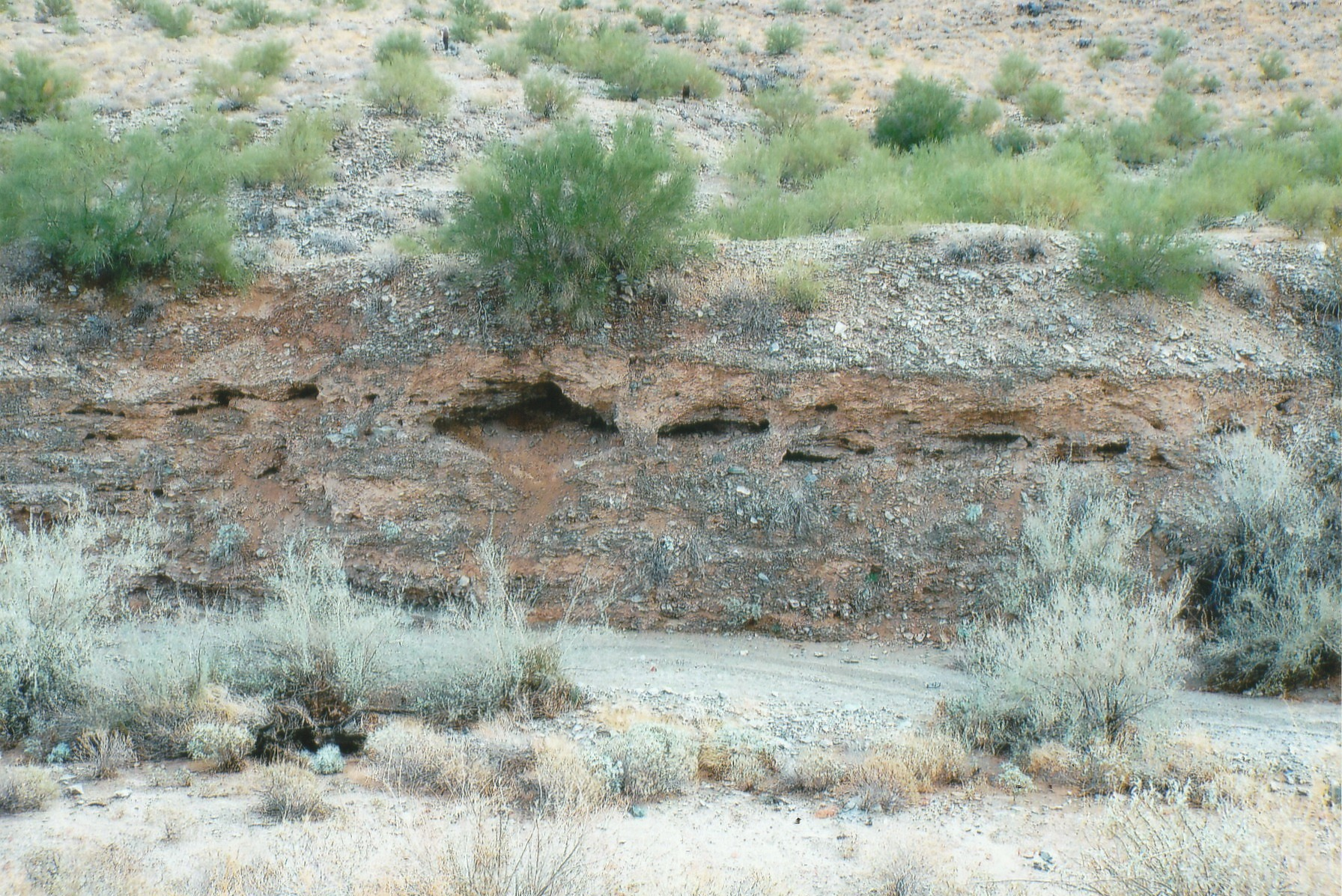
Goldmine Gulch. The gulch is a narrow and steep-sided ravine marking the course of a fast stream.

== See also ==
- List of historic properties in Queen Creek, Arizona

=== Arizona pioneers ===
- Bill Downing
- Henry Garfias
- Winston C. Hackett
- John C. Lincoln
- Paul W. Litchfield
- Joe Mayer
- William John Murphy
- Wing F. Ong
- Levi Ruggles
- Sedona Schnebly
- Michael Sullivan
- Trinidad Swilling
- Ora Rush Weed
- Henry Wickenburg
