= Richland Township, Guernsey County, Ohio =

Township in Ohio, US

- Township
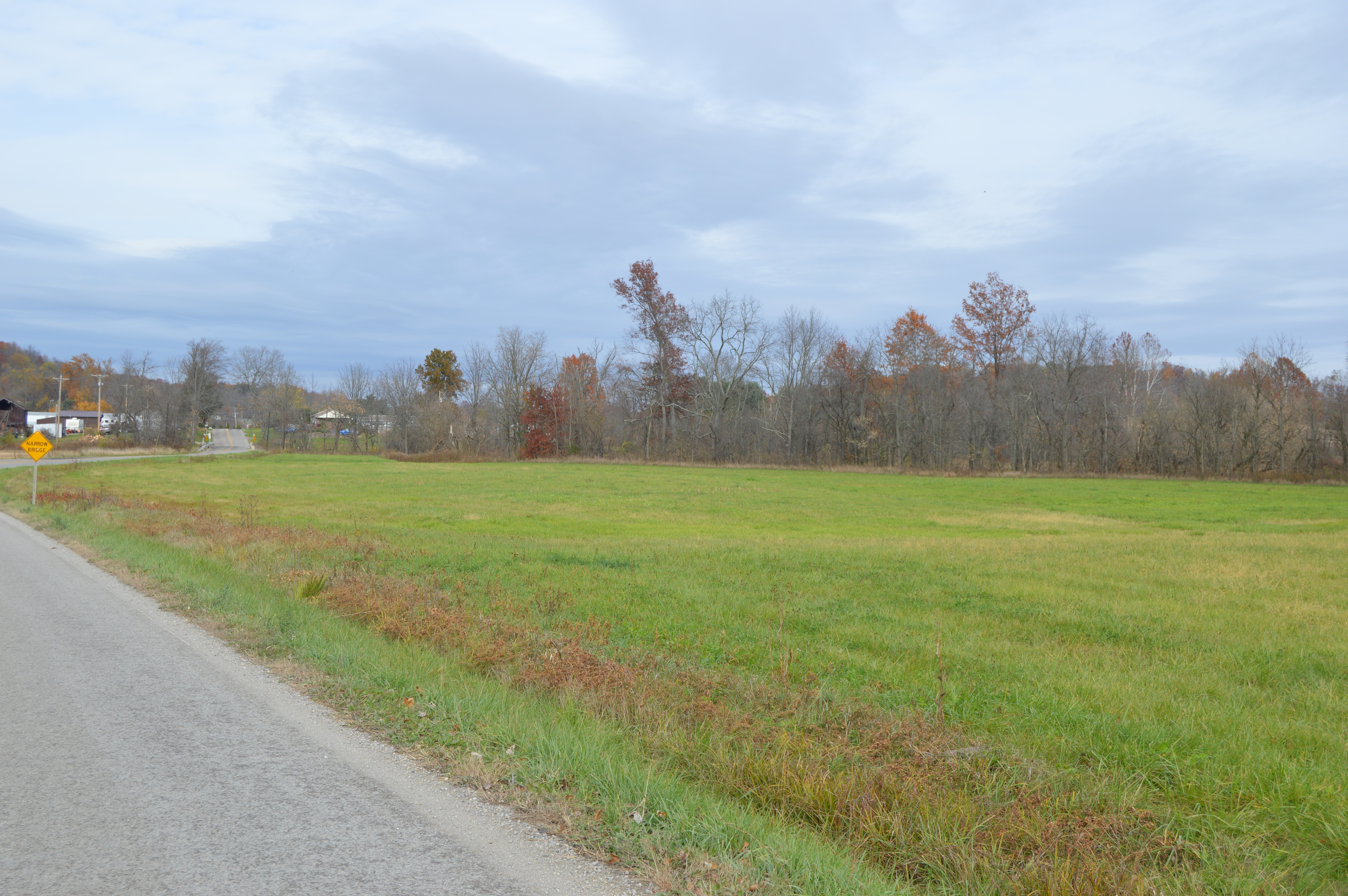
- Fields on Salem Road, just south of Leatherwood Creek

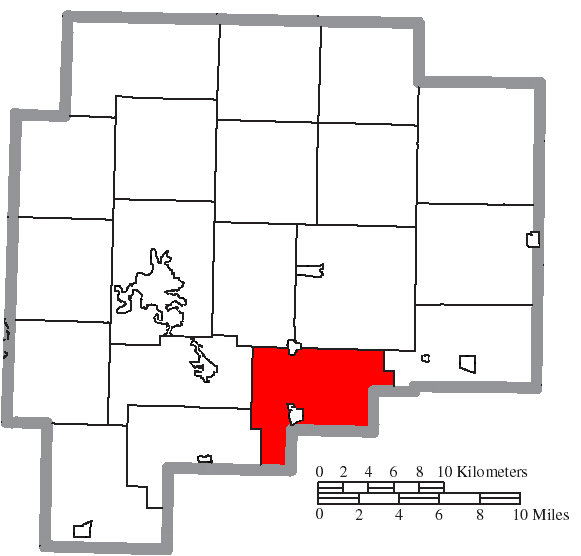
- Location of Richland Township in Guernsey County
- Coordinates: 39°56′27″N 81°26′11″W
- Country: United States
- State: Ohio
- County: Guernsey

Area
  - Total: 29.0 sq mi (75.2 km^{2})
  - Land: 28.0 sq mi (72.4 km^{2})
  - Water: 1.1 sq mi (2.9 km^{2})
- Elevation: 899 ft (274 m)

Population (2020)
  - Total: 2,066
  - Density: 73.9/sq mi (28.5/km^{2})
- Time zone: UTC-5 (Eastern (EST))
  - Summer (DST): UTC-4 (EDT)
- FIPS code: 39-66698
- GNIS feature ID: 1086189

Richland Township is one of the nineteen townships of Guernsey County, Ohio, United States. As of the 2020 census, the population was 2,066.

== Geography ==
Located in the southern part of the county, it borders the following townships:

- Wills Township - north
- Millwood Township - northeast
- Wayne Township, Noble County - east
- Seneca Township, Noble County - southeast corner
- Buffalo Township, Noble County - south
- Valley Township - southwest
- Jackson Township - west
- Center Township - northwest

Two incorporated villages are located in Richland Township: part of Lore City in the north, and Senecaville in the south. Leatherwood Creek flows through the northern part of the township.

== Name and history ==
Richland Township was established in 1810. It is one of twelve Richland Townships statewide.

== Government ==
The township is governed by a three-member board of trustees, who are elected in November of odd-numbered years to a four-year term beginning on the following January 1. Two are elected in the year after the presidential election and one is elected in the year before it. There is also an elected township fiscal officer, who serves a four-year term beginning on April 1 of the year after the election, which is held in November of the year before the presidential election. Vacancies in the fiscal officership or on the board of trustees are filled by the remaining trustees.
