= Elizabethtown, Guernsey County, Ohio =

Unincorporated community in Ohio, U.S.

Coordinates: 40°02′09″N 81°24′23″W

Elizabethtown is an unincorporated community in Guernsey County, in the U.S. state of Ohio.

== History ==
Elizabethtown was platted in 1832.
