= Quaker City, Ohio =

- Village
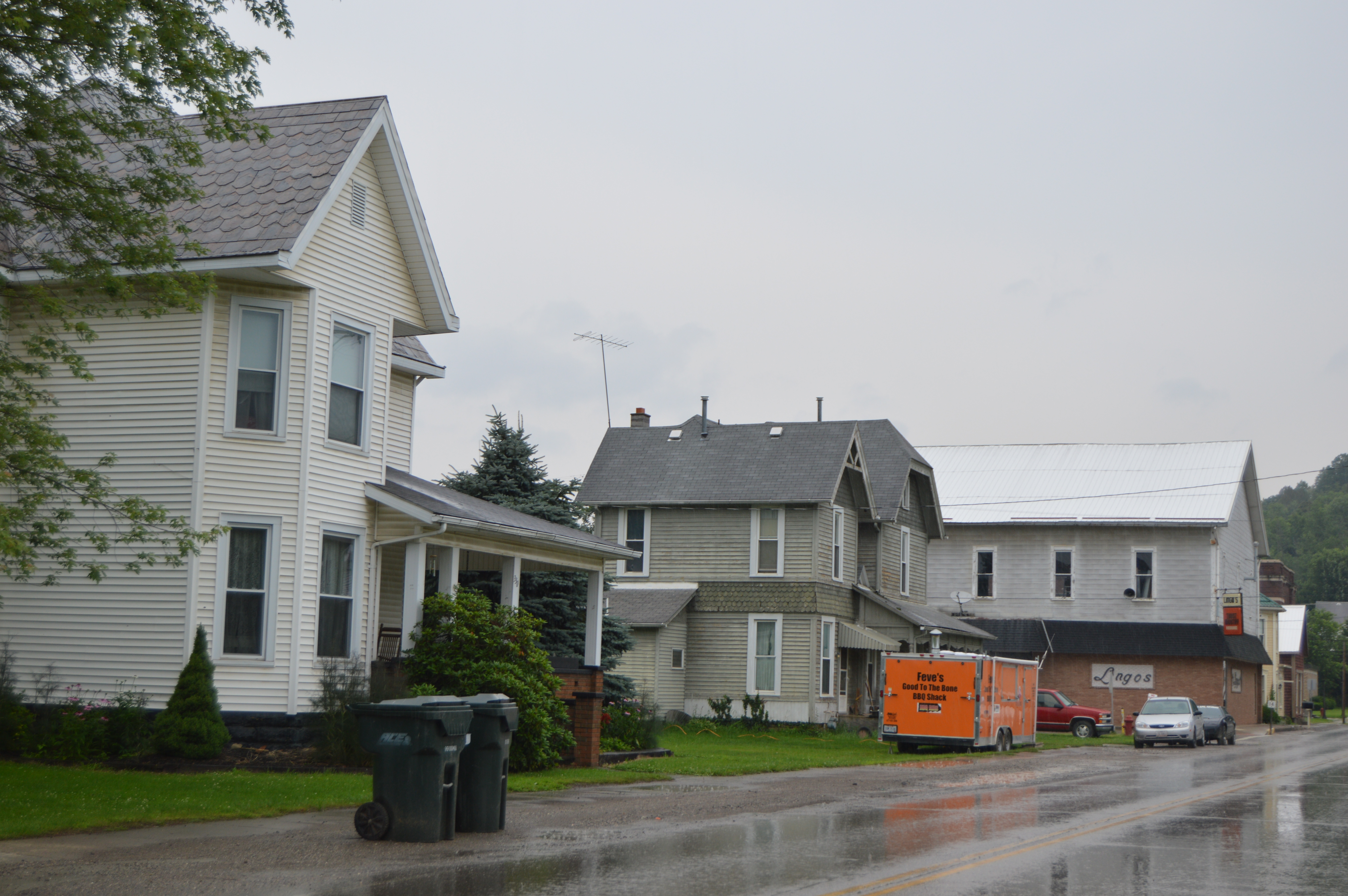
- Houses on South Street
- Nicknames: Millwood and Leatherwood
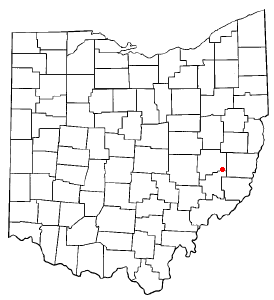
- Location of Quaker City, Ohio

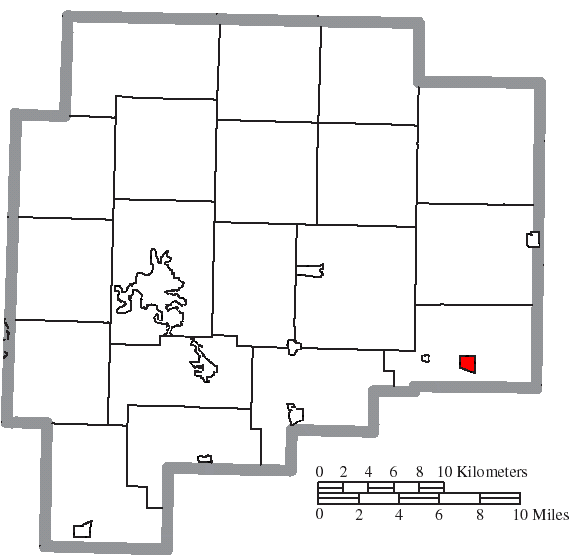
- Location of Quaker City in Guernsey County
- Coordinates: 39°58′11″N 81°17′50″W
- Country: United States
- State: Ohio
- County: Guernsey
- Township: Millwood

Area
  - Total: 0.53 sq mi (1.36 km^{2})
  - Land: 0.53 sq mi (1.36 km^{2})
  - Water: 0 sq mi (0.00 km^{2})
- Elevation: 863 ft (263 m)

Population (2020)
  - Total: 379
  - Density: 721.2/sq mi (278.46/km^{2})
- Time zone: UTC-5 (Eastern (EST))
  - Summer (DST): UTC-4 (EDT)
- ZIP codes: 43736, 43773
- Area code: 740
- FIPS code: 39-65116
- GNIS feature ID: 2399031

Quaker City is a village in Guernsey County, Ohio, United States. The population was 379 at the 2020 census.

== History ==
The first settlement at Quaker City was made ca. 1850, but growth remained static until a store opened at the site in 1870. A post office called Quaker City has been in operation until 1872.

== Geography ==
Quaker City is located along Leatherwood Creek.

According to the United States Census Bureau, the village has a total area of 0.53 square miles (1.37 km^{2}), all land.

== Demographics ==
Historical population
Census	Pop.	Note	%±
1880	594		—
1890	845		42.3%
1900	878		3.9%
1910	746		−15.0%
1920	732		−1.9%
1930	613		−16.3%
1940	634		3.4%
1950	655		3.3%
1960	583		−11.0%
1970	510		−12.5%
1980	698		36.9%
1990	560		−19.8%
2000	563		0.5%
2010	502		−10.8%
2020	379		−24.5%
U.S. Decennial Census

=== 2010 census ===
As of the census of 2010, there were 502 people, 202 households, and 142 families living in the village. The population density was 947.2 inhabitants per square mile (365.7/km^{2}). There were 233 housing units at an average density of 439.6 per square mile (169.7/km^{2}). The racial makeup of the village was 99.0% White, 0.4% Asian, 0.4% from other races, and 0.2% from two or more races. Hispanic or Latino of any race were 0.8% of the population.

There were 202 households, of which 32.7% had children under the age of 18 living with them, 52.5% were married couples living together, 14.4% had a female householder with no husband present, 3.5% had a male householder with no wife present, and 29.7% were non-families. 24.3% of all households were made up of individuals, and 9.9% had someone living alone who was 65 years of age or older. The average household size was 2.49 and the average family size was 2.98.

The median age in the village was 37.8 years. 25.5% of residents were under the age of 18; 9.5% were between the ages of 18 and 24; 25% were from 25 to 44; 24.8% were from 45 to 64; and 15.5% were 65 years of age or older. The gender makeup of the village was 48.6% male and 51.4% female.

=== 2000 census ===
As of the census of 2000, there were 563 people, 220 households, and 159 families living in the village. The population density was 1,063.6 inhabitants per square mile (410.7/km^{2}). There were 241 housing units at an average density of 455.3 per square mile (175.8/km^{2}). The racial makeup of the village was 99.29% White, 0.18% African American, 0.36% from other races, and 0.18% from two or more races. Hispanic or Latino of any race were 0.36% of the population.

There were 220 households, out of which 36.4% had children under the age of 18 living with them, 57.3% were married couples living together, 9.1% had a female householder with no husband present, and 27.3% were non-families. 25.0% of all households were made up of individuals, and 13.2% had someone living alone who was 65 years of age or older. The average household size was 2.56 and the average family size was 3.04.

In the village, the population was spread out, with 27.4% under the age of 18, 8.7% from 18 to 24, 29.5% from 25 to 44, 19.7% from 45 to 64, and 14.7% who were 65 years of age or older. The median age was 34 years. For every 100 females there were 94.1 males. For every 100 females age 18 and over, there were 89.4 males.

The median income for a household in the village was $22,176, and the median income for a family was $28,750. Males had a median income of $24,583 versus $15,865 for females. The per capita income for the village was $11,148. About 16.3% of families and 16.0% of the population were below the poverty line, including 18.7% of those under age 18 and 27.5% of those age 65 or over.

== Notable people ==
- Mansel Carter, Arizona Mountain man
- Nathan B. Scott, United States senator (1899-1911)
- Viola D. Romans, college professor, WCTU leader, Ohio state representative (1924-1928)
