= Walhonding, Guernsey County, Ohio =

Walhonding, Ohio
- Unincorporated community
- Location within Ohio Location within the United States
- Coordinates: 39°54′16″N 81°29′50″W
- Country: United States
- State: Ohio
- County: Guernsey
- Township: Valley

Area
  - Water: 0 sq mi (0.0 km^{2})
- Elevation: 833 ft (254 m)
- Time zone: UTC-5 (Eastern (EST))
  - Summer (DST): UTC-4 (EDT)
- GNIS feature ID: 1065447

Walhonding is an unincorporated community and coal town in southeastern Valley Township, Guernsey County, Ohio, United States.

Walhonding was a former mining community and home to two mine shafts known as walhonding mine no. 1 and walhonding mine no.2. Today little remains reflecting this history besides a large slate pile and a few abandoned mining homes. The roads in this area reflect the names of former residents many of which were of Czech and Slovak ancestry.
