= Lore City, Ohio =

- Village
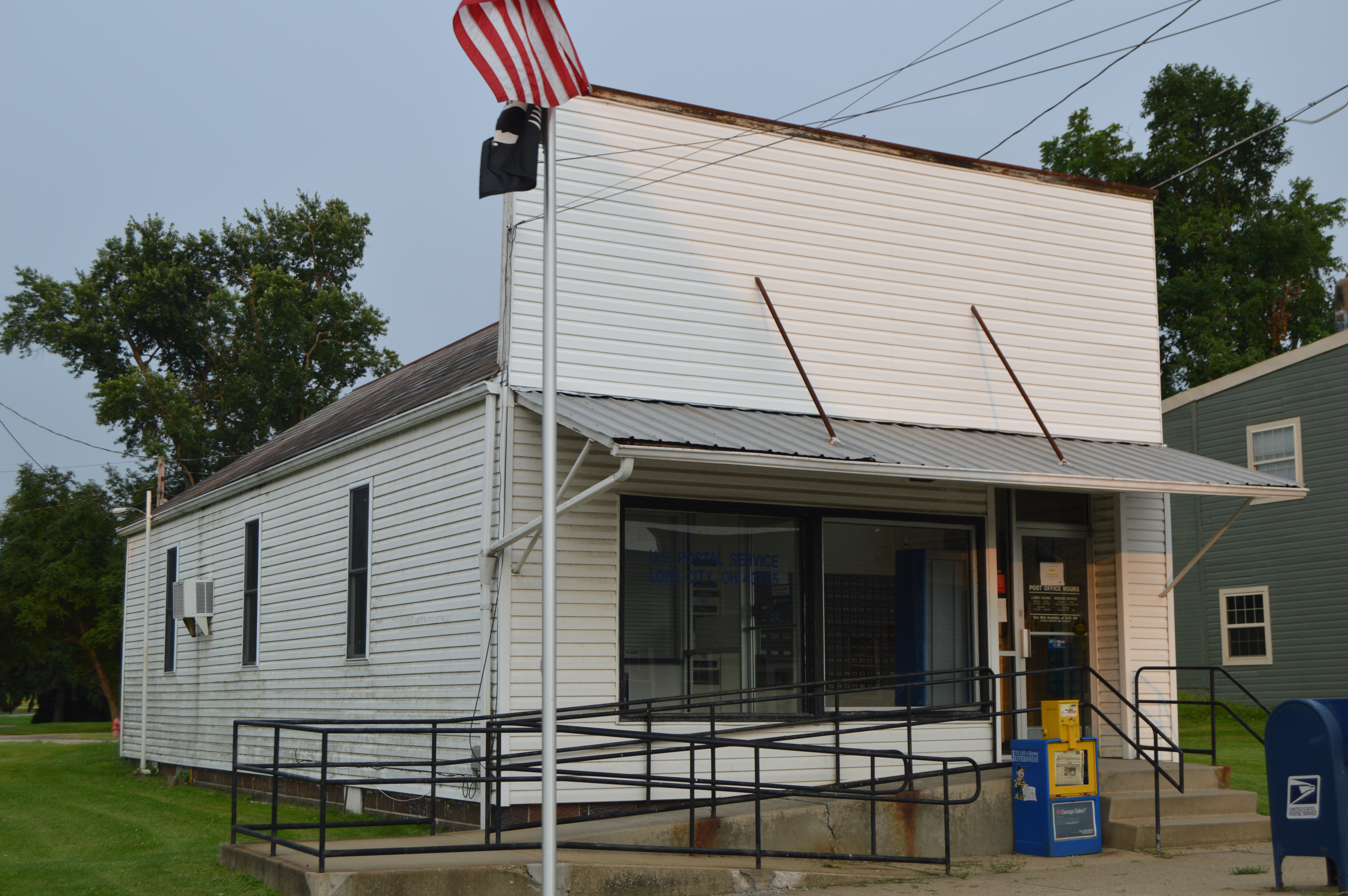
- Post office on Main Street

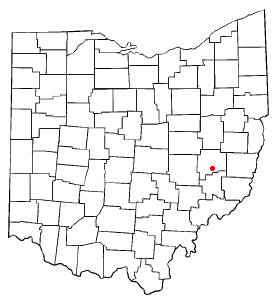
- Location of Lore City, Ohio

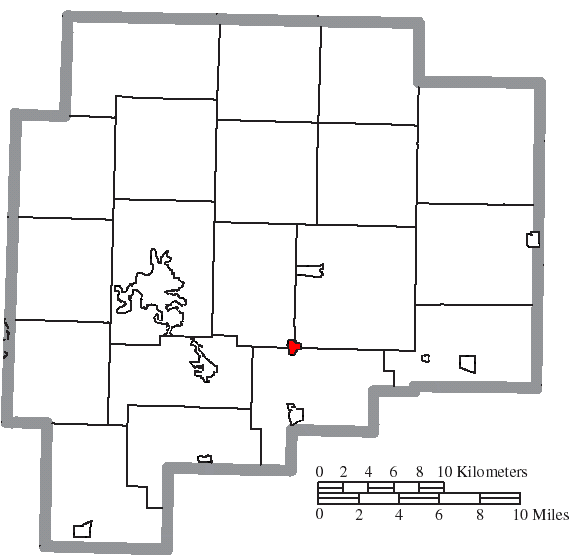
- Location of Lore City in Guernsey County
- Coordinates: 39°59′00″N 81°27′36″W
- Country: United States
- State: Ohio
- County: Guernsey
- Townships: Wills, Center, & Richland

Area
  - Total: 0.33 sq mi (0.85 km^{2})
  - Land: 0.33 sq mi (0.85 km^{2})
  - Water: 0 sq mi (0.00 km^{2})
- Elevation: 843 ft (257 m)

Population (2020)
  - Total: 282
  - Density: 860.0/sq mi (332.05/km^{2})
- Time zone: UTC-5 (Eastern (EST))
  - Summer (DST): UTC-4 (EDT)
- ZIP code: 43755
- Area code: 740
- FIPS code: 39-44954
- GNIS feature ID: 2398476

Lore City is a village in Guernsey County, Ohio, United States. The population was 282 at the 2020 census.

== History ==
A post office has been in operation at Lore City since 1876. Lore City was not platted until 1903. The village was incorporated in 1906.

== Geography ==
According to the United States Census Bureau, the village has a total area of 0.33 square miles (0.85 km^{2}), all land. Leatherwood Creek flows through the village.

== Demographics ==
Historical population
| Census | Pop. | Note | %± |
|---|---|---|---|
| 1910 | 609 | | — |
| 1920 | 784 | | 28.7% |
| 1930 | 580 | | −26.0% |
| 1940 | 606 | | 4.5% |
| 1950 | 495 | | −18.3% |
| 1960 | 458 | | −7.5% |
| 1970 | 401 | | −12.4% |
| 1980 | 443 | | 10.5% |
| 1990 | 384 | | −13.3% |
| 2000 | 305 | | −20.6% |
| 2010 | 325 | | 6.6% |
| 2020 | 282 | | −13.2% |
U.S. Decennial Census

=== 2010 census ===
As of the census of 2010, there were 325 people, 118 households, and 88 families living in the village. The population density was 984.8 inhabitants per square mile (380.2/km^{2}). There were 139 housing units at an average density of 421.2 per square mile (162.6/km^{2}). The racial makeup of the village was 95.7% White, 0.6% African American, 0.3% Native American, 0.9% from other races, and 2.5% from two or more races. Hispanic or Latino of any race were 2.5% of the population.

There were 118 households, of which 40.7% had children under the age of 18 living with them, 52.5% were married couples living together, 11.9% had a female householder with no husband present, 10.2% had a male householder with no wife present, and 25.4% were non-families. 21.2% of all households were made up of individuals, and 10.2% had someone living alone who was 65 years of age or older. The average household size was 2.75 and the average family size was 3.16.

The median age in the village was 32.8 years. 31.4% of residents were under the age of 18; 4.9% were between the ages of 18 and 24; 26.7% were from 25 to 44; 20.3% were from 45 to 64; and 16.6% were 65 years of age or older. The gender makeup of the village was 47.7% male and 52.3% female.

=== 2000 census ===
As of the census of 2000, there were 305 people, 125 households, and 88 families living in the village. The population density was 914.1 inhabitants per square mile (352.9/km^{2}). There were 145 housing units at an average density of 434.6 per square mile (167.8/km^{2}). The racial makeup of the village was 95.41% White, 0.66% Native American, 0.33% Pacific Islander, and 3.61% from two or more races. Hispanic or Latino of any race were 0.33% of the population.

There were 125 households, out of which 33.6% had children under the age of 18 living with them, 57.6% were married couples living together, 8.0% had a female householder with no husband present, and 29.6% were non-families. 27.2% of all households were made up of individuals, and 13.6% had someone living alone who was 65 years of age or older. The average household size was 2.44 and the average family size was 2.93.

In the village, the population was spread out, with 24.9% under the age of 18, 7.9% from 18 to 24, 29.8% from 25 to 44, 24.3% from 45 to 64, and 13.1% who were 65 years of age or older. The median age was 38 years. For every 100 females there were 84.8 males. For every 100 females age 18 and over, there were 92.4 males.

The median income for a household in the village was $30,000, and the median income for a family was $39,500. Males had a median income of $30,357 versus $16,635 for females. The per capita income for the village was $16,272. About 11.1% of families and 14.2% of the population were below the poverty line, including 16.4% of those under the age of eighteen and 16.3% of those 65 or over.

== Schools ==
Lore City is within the Rolling Hills School District. Students attend Meadowbrook High School, Meadowbrook Middle School, Brook Intermediate and Secrest Elementary.
