= Millwood Township, Lincoln County, Missouri =

Township in Lincoln County, Missouri, U.S.

Coordinates: 39.09°N 91.09°W

Millwood Township is an inactive township in Lincoln County, in the U.S. state of Missouri.

Millwood Township was established in 1856, taking its name from the community of Millwood, Missouri.
