= Joseph C. Dylkes =

Joseph C. Dylkes, also known as the Leatherwood God, was a messianic figure in the early settlement of the Ohio Country in the United States. Very little is known about Dylkes. Details about his birth, as well as his whereabouts following his mysterious disappearance, are apocryphal.

== Life ==
Dylkes achieved notoriety in August 1828, at a camp meeting near a chapel known as the Leatherwood Church in Salesville, Ohio. On a Sunday afternoon, the United Brethren minister John Crum was preaching to a large congregation when a voice shouted "Salvation" followed by a strange sound, similar to the snort of a horse.

Everyone was taken by surprise and turned to see a stranger dressed in a black broadcloth suit, frock coat, white cravat, and yellow beaver hat. He appeared to be between the ages of 45 and 50 and wore long black hair.

The stranger was hosted by some members of that congregation. He attended various religious meetings, and sometimes preached. Displaying knowledge of the Bible, he started to declare himself a celestial being, and finally claimed he was the Messiah come to establish a kingdom that would never end. His assertion of immortality was bolstered by claims that no one could harm or even touch him.

Some families accepted his claims and became his followers, stirring controversy in the Ohio valley. A mob came to a religious service in the home of a Dylkes follower to have him arrested.

Dylkes was taken before the local Squire to be charged but was released on the grounds that it "was not a crime to be a god." Dylkes took refuge in a farm belonging to one of his followers and ultimately declared he was going to Philadelphia to establish a "New Jerusalem." During the trip he disappeared without a trace.

== See also ==
- List of messiah claimants
- Messiah complex
