= Millwood Township, Guernsey County, Ohio =

Township in Ohio, US

- Township
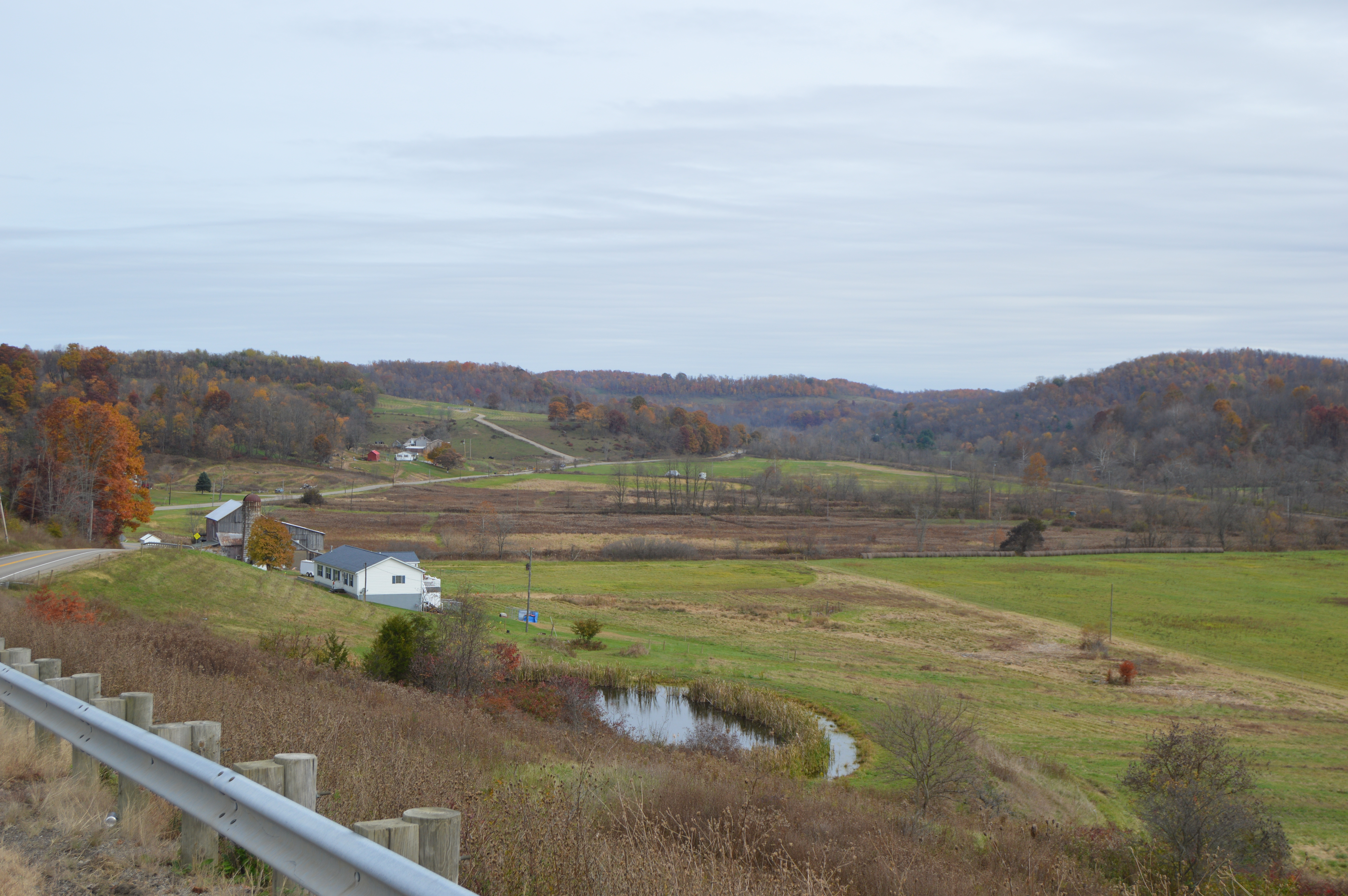
- Fields just east of Quaker City

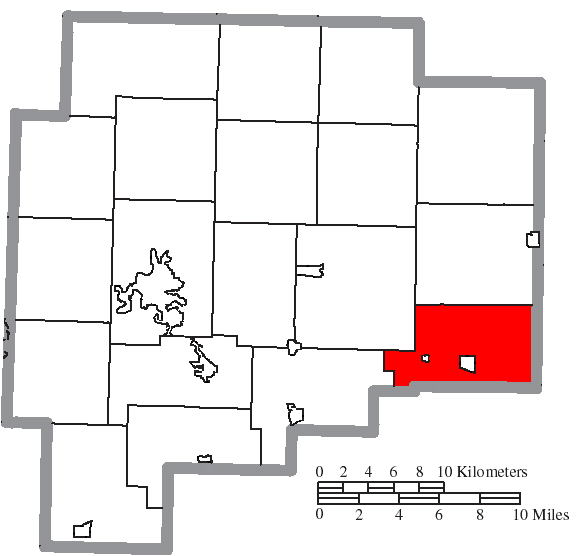
- Location of Millwood Township in Guernsey County
- Coordinates: 39°58′36″N 81°18′40″W
- Country: United States
- State: Ohio
- County: Guernsey

Area
  - Total: 27.20 sq mi (70.46 km^{2})
  - Land: 27.20 sq mi (70.44 km^{2})
  - Water: 0.0077 sq mi (0.02 km^{2})
- Elevation: 1,184 ft (361 m)

Population (2020)
  - Total: 1,258
  - Density: 46.26/sq mi (17.86/km^{2})
- Time zone: UTC-5 (Eastern (EST))
  - Summer (DST): UTC-4 (EDT)
- FIPS code: 39-50568
- GNIS feature ID: 1086186

Millwood Township is one of the nineteen townships of Guernsey County, Ohio, United States. As of the 2020 census the population was 1,258.

== Geography ==
Located in the southeastern corner of the county, it borders the following townships:

- Oxford Township - north
- Warren Township, Belmont County - east
- Somerset Township, Belmont County - southeast
- Beaver Township, Noble County - south
- Wayne Township, Noble County - southwest
- Richland Township - west
- Wills Township - northwest

One incorporated village is located in Millwood Township: Quaker City, near the township center. Salesville, in the western part of the township, is a former village and census-designated place which disincorporated in 2015. Leatherwood Creek flows through the township.

== Name and history ==
Millwood Township was established around 1834. It is the only Millwood Township statewide.

== Government ==
The township is governed by a three-member board of trustees, who are elected in November of odd-numbered years to a four-year term beginning on the following January 1. Two are elected in the year after the presidential election and one is elected in the year before it. There is also an elected township fiscal officer, who serves a four-year term beginning on April 1 of the year after the election, which is held in November of the year before the presidential election. Vacancies in the fiscal officership or on the board of trustees are filled by the remaining trustees.
