= Salesville, Ohio =

- Census-designated place
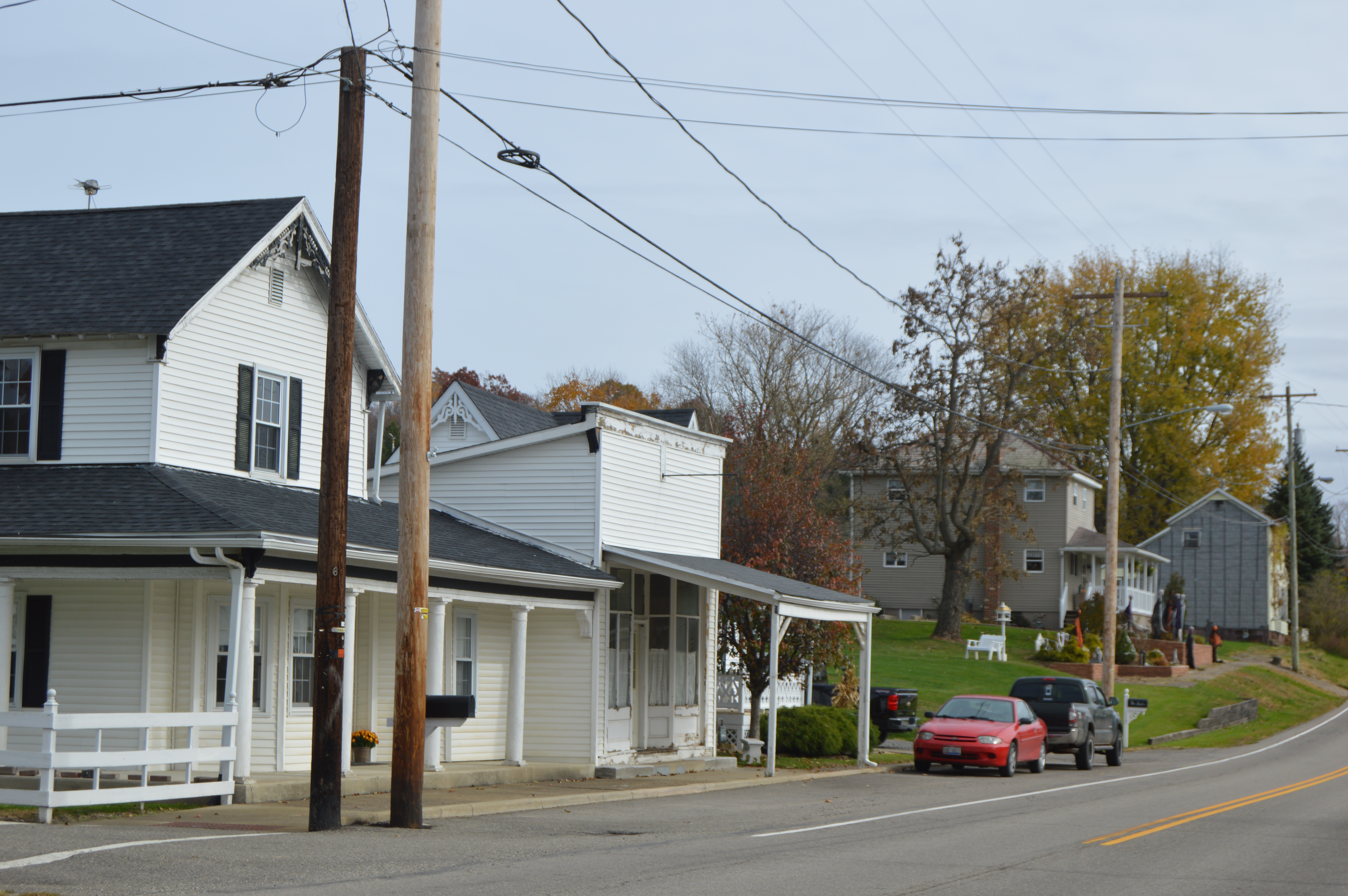
- Main Street

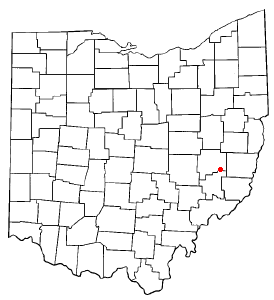
- Location of Salesville, Ohio

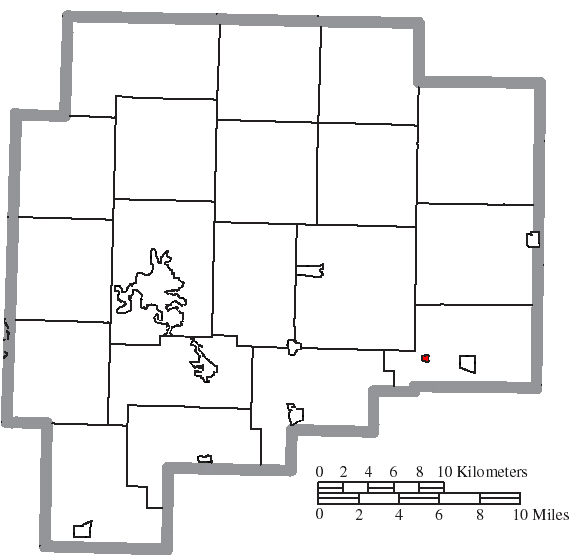
- Location of Salesville in Guernsey County
- Coordinates: 39°58′27″N 81°20′12″W
- Country: United States
- State: Ohio
- County: Guernsey
- Township: Millwood
- Platted: 1835; 191 years ago
- Incorporated: 1878; 148 years ago
- Dissolved: 2016; 10 years ago

Area
  - Total: 0.19 sq mi (0.50 km^{2})
  - Land: 0.19 sq mi (0.50 km^{2})
  - Water: 0 sq mi (0.00 km^{2})
- Elevation: 876 ft (267 m)

Population (2020)
  - Total: 123
  - Density: 632.7/sq mi (244.29/km^{2})
- Time zone: UTC-5 (Eastern (EST))
  - Summer (DST): UTC-4 (EDT)
- ZIP code: 43778
- Area code: 740
- FIPS code: 39-70072
- GNIS feature ID: 2785007

Salesville is a census-designated place and former village in Guernsey County, Ohio, United States. As of the 2020 census, the population was 123, down from 129 at the 2010 census. Its residents voted for dissolution in 2016.

== History ==
Salesville was platted in 1835. The village was incorporated in 1878. A post office called Salesville was established in 1855, and remained in operation until 2002.

In 1828 at a Salesville camp meeting, Joseph C. Dylkes made his public claim as a messiah, becoming known as the Leatherwood God.

== Geography ==
Salesville is located along Leatherwood Creek.

According to the United States Census Bureau, the village had a total area of 0.10 square miles (0.26 km^{2}), all land.

== Demographics ==
Historical population
Census	Pop.	Note	%±
1850	71		—
1860	120		69.0%
1870	172		43.3%
1880	266		54.7%
1890	296		11.3%
1900	286		−3.4%
1910	265		−7.3%
1920	247		−6.8%
1930	193		−21.9%
1940	213		10.4%
1950	187		−12.2%
1960	173		−7.5%
1970	154		−11.0%
1980	139		−9.7%
1990	84		−39.6%
2000	154		83.3%
2010	129		−16.2%
2020	123		−4.7%
U.S. Decennial Census

=== 2010 census ===
As of the census of 2010, there were 129 people, 50 households, and 34 families living in the village. The population density was 1,290.0 inhabitants per square mile (498.1/km^{2}). There were 58 housing units at an average density of 580.0 per square mile (223.9/km^{2}). The racial makeup of the village was 96.9% White, 1.6% African American, and 1.6% from two or more races.

There were 50 households, of which 42.0% had children under the age of 18 living with them, 54.0% were married couples living together, 6.0% had a female householder with no husband present, 8.0% had a male householder with no wife present, and 32.0% were non-families. 28.0% of all households were made up of individuals, and 20% had someone living alone who was 65 years of age or older. The average household size was 2.58 and the average family size was 3.15.

The median age in the village was 37.5 years. 26.4% of residents were under the age of 18; 13.9% were between the ages of 18 and 24; 24.8% were from 25 to 44; 23.3% were from 45 to 64; and 11.6% were 65 years of age or older. The gender makeup of the village was 49.6% male and 50.4% female.

=== 2000 census ===
As of the census of 2000, there were 154 people, 53 households, and 40 families living in the village. The population density was 1,567.6 inhabitants per square mile (605.3/km^{2}). There were 67 housing units at an average density of 682.0 per square mile (263.3/km^{2}). The racial makeup of the village was 99.35% White, and 0.65% from two or more races.

There were 53 households, out of which 45.3% had children under the age of 18 living with them, 60.4% were married couples living together, 9.4% had a female householder with no husband present, and 24.5% were non-families. 18.9% of all households were made up of individuals, and 15.1% had someone living alone who was 65 years of age or older. The average household size was 2.91 and the average family size was 3.38.

In the village the population was spread out, with 31.2% under the age of 18, 5.8% from 18 to 24, 33.1% from 25 to 44, 15.6% from 45 to 64, and 14.3% who were 65 years of age or older. The median age was 35 years. For every 100 females, there were 87.8 males. For every 100 females age 18 and over, there were 86.0 males.

The median income for a household in the village was $37,917, and the median income for a family was $39,583. Males had a median income of $29,375 versus $15,250 for females. The per capita income for the village was $13,250. About 7.3% of families and 12.3% of the population were below the poverty line, including 12.8% of those under the age of eighteen and 26.1% of those 65 or over.
