= Center Township, Guernsey County, Ohio =

Township in Ohio, US

- Township
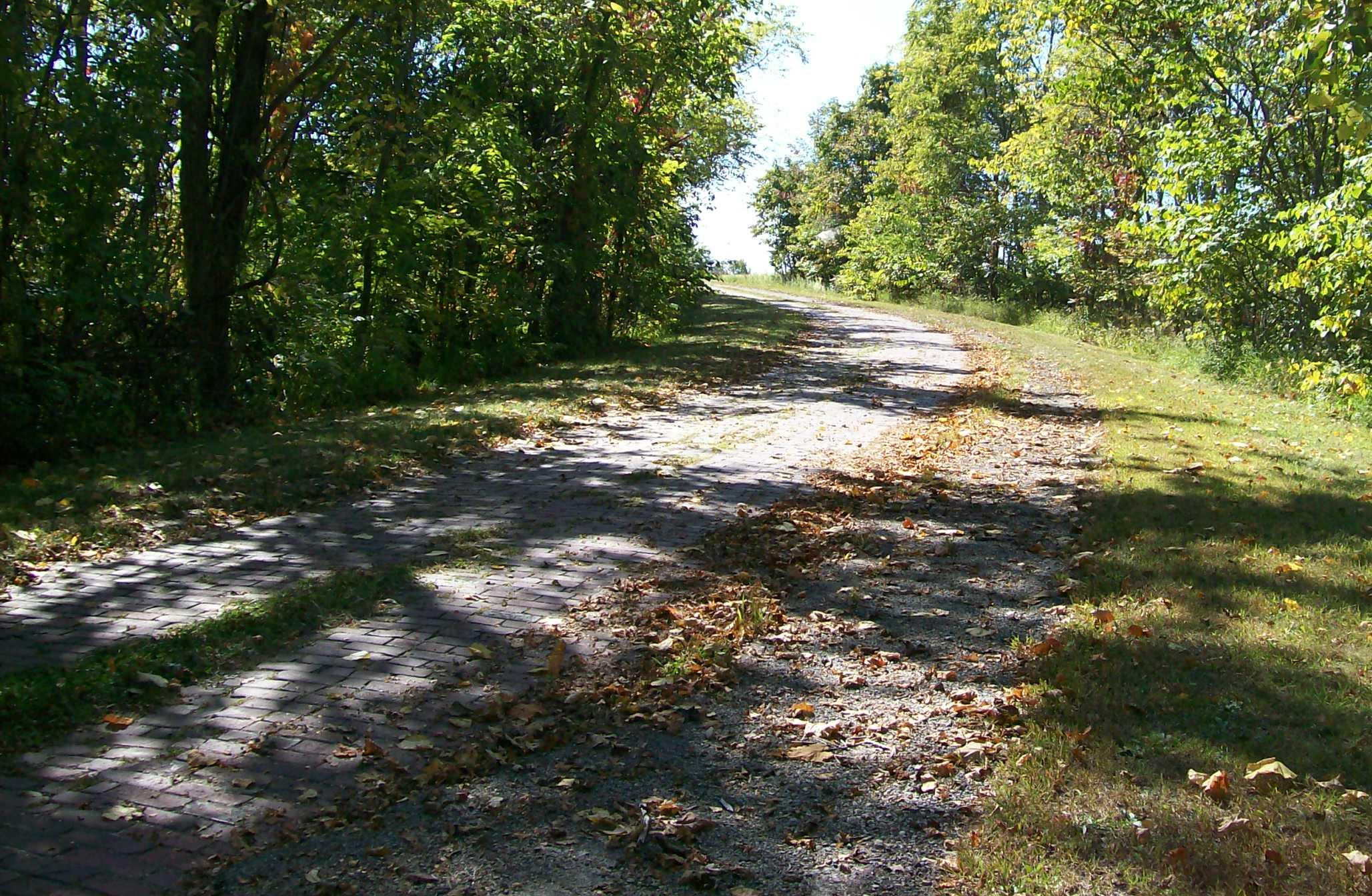
- Peacock Road, an old alignment of the National Road

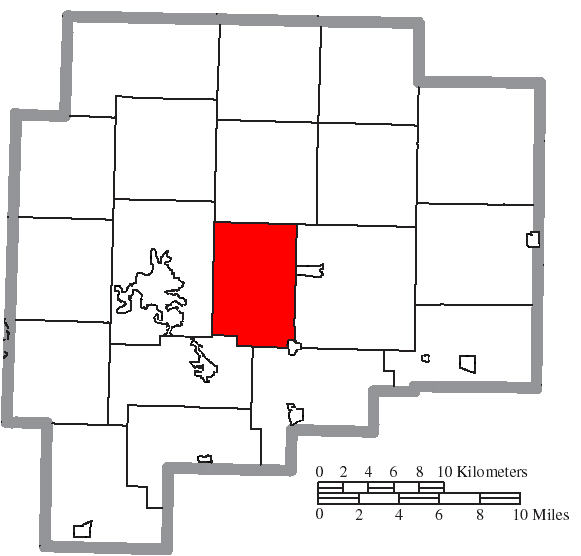
- Location of Center Township in Guernsey County
- Coordinates: 40°0′54″N 81°29′38″W
- Country: United States
- State: Ohio
- County: Guernsey

Area
  - Total: 24.4 sq mi (63.1 km^{2})
  - Land: 24.2 sq mi (62.7 km^{2})
  - Water: 0.19 sq mi (0.5 km^{2})
- Elevation: 961 ft (293 m)

Population (2020)
  - Total: 1,744
  - Density: 72.0/sq mi (27.8/km^{2})
- Time zone: UTC-5 (Eastern (EST))
  - Summer (DST): UTC-4 (EDT)
- FIPS code: 39-12938
- GNIS feature ID: 1086179

Center Township is one of the nineteen townships of Guernsey County, Ohio, United States. As of the 2020 census the population was 1,744.

== Geography ==
Located at the center of the county, it borders the following townships:

- Jefferson Township - north
- Wills Township - east
- Richland Township - southeast
- Jackson Township - southwest
- Cambridge Township - west

A portion of the village of Lore City is located in the southwest corner of Center Township, and the unincorporated community of Kipling lies in the southwestern part of the township. Leatherwood Creek, a tributary of Wills Creek and part of the Muskingum River watershed, flows through the southern part of the township.

== Name and history ==
Center Township was organized in 1822, and named for its location near the geographical center of Guernsey County. It is one of nine Center Townships statewide.

== Government ==
The township is governed by a three-member board of trustees, who are elected in November of odd-numbered years to a four-year term beginning on the following January 1. Two are elected in the year after the presidential election and one is elected in the year before it. There is also an elected township fiscal officer, who serves a four-year term beginning on April 1 of the year after the election, which is held in November of the year before the presidential election. Vacancies in the fiscal officership or on the board of trustees are filled by the remaining trustees.
