= Wills Township, Guernsey County, Ohio =

Township in Ohio, US

- Township
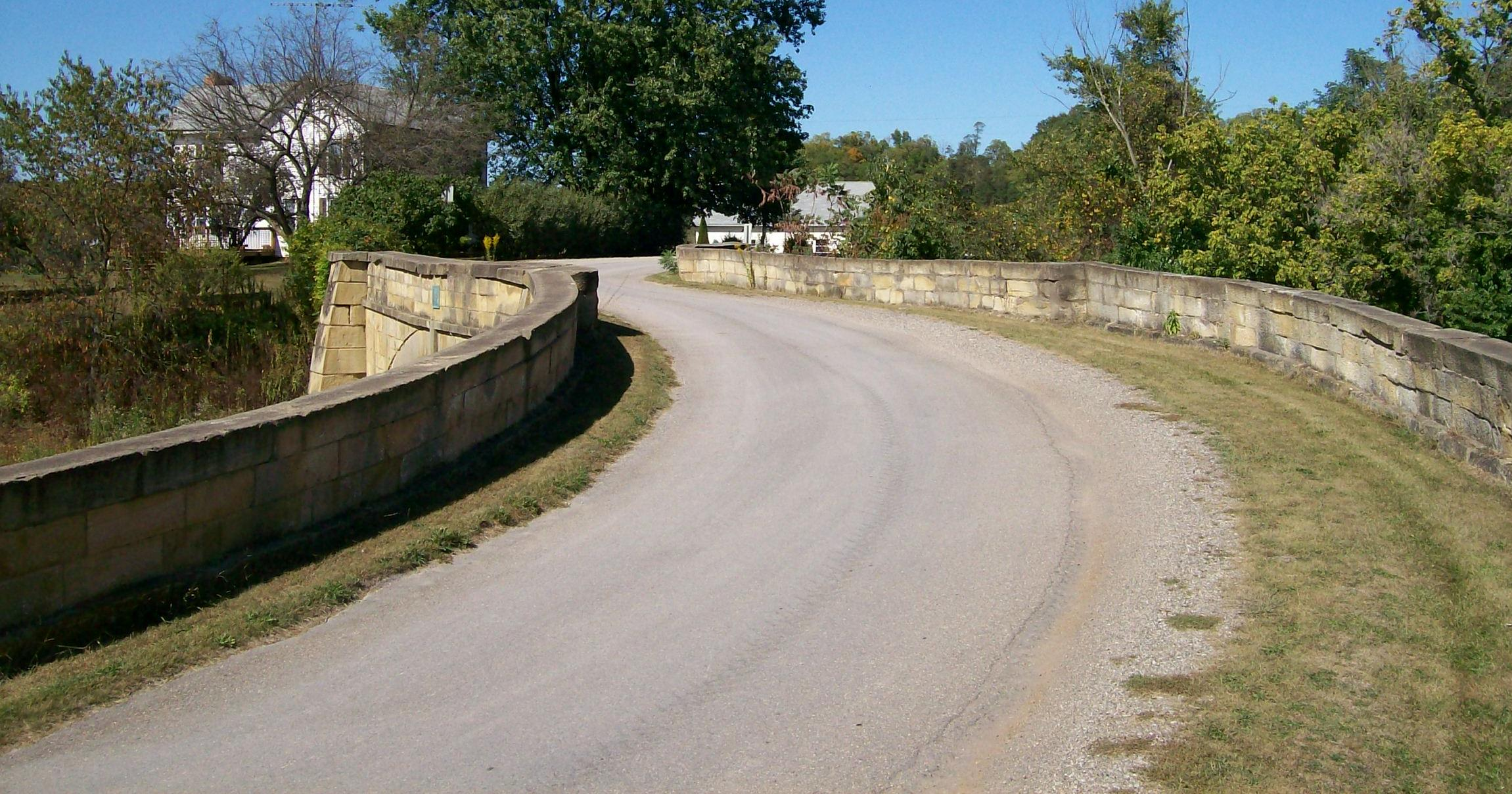
- S bridge on the National Road, built 1828

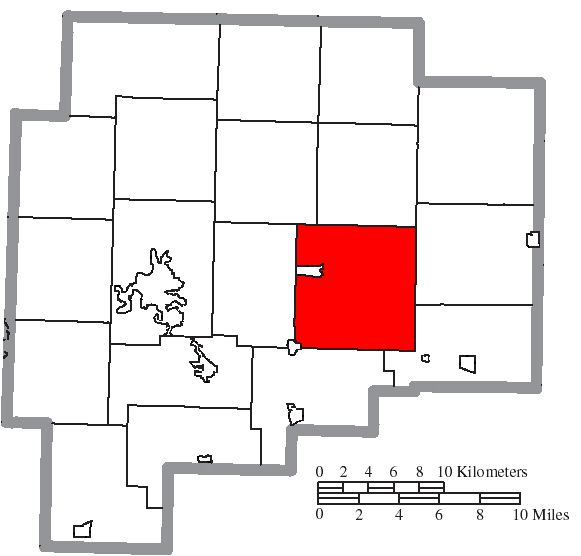
- Location of Wills Township in Guernsey County
- Coordinates: 40°1′1″N 81°25′19″W
- Country: United States
- State: Ohio
- County: Guernsey

Area
  - Total: 36.47 sq mi (94.45 km^{2})
  - Land: 36.45 sq mi (94.41 km^{2})
  - Water: 0.015 sq mi (0.04 km^{2})
- Elevation: 965 ft (294 m)

Population (2020)
  - Total: 1,521
  - Density: 41.73/sq mi (16.11/km^{2})
- Time zone: UTC-5 (Eastern (EST))
  - Summer (DST): UTC-4 (EDT)
- FIPS code: 39-85708
- GNIS feature ID: 1086195

Wills Township is one of the nineteen townships of Guernsey County, Ohio, United States. As of the 2020 census the population was 1,521.

== Geography ==
Located in the eastern part of the county, it borders the following townships:

- Madison Township – north
- Oxford Township – northeast
- Millwood Township – southeast
- Richland Township – southwest
- Center Township – west
- Jefferson Township – northwest

Two villages are located in Wills Township: part of Lore City in the southwestern corner, and Old Washington in the west.

== Name and history ==
Wills Township was organized in 1810. It is the only Wills Township statewide.

== Government ==
The township is governed by a three-member board of trustees, who are elected in November of odd-numbered years to a four-year term beginning on the following January 1. Two are elected in the year after the presidential election and one is elected in the year before it. There is also an elected township fiscal officer, who serves a four-year term beginning on April 1 of the year after the election, which is held in November of the year before the presidential election. Vacancies in the fiscal officership or on the board of trustees are filled by the remaining trustees.
