= Old Washington, Ohio =

- Village
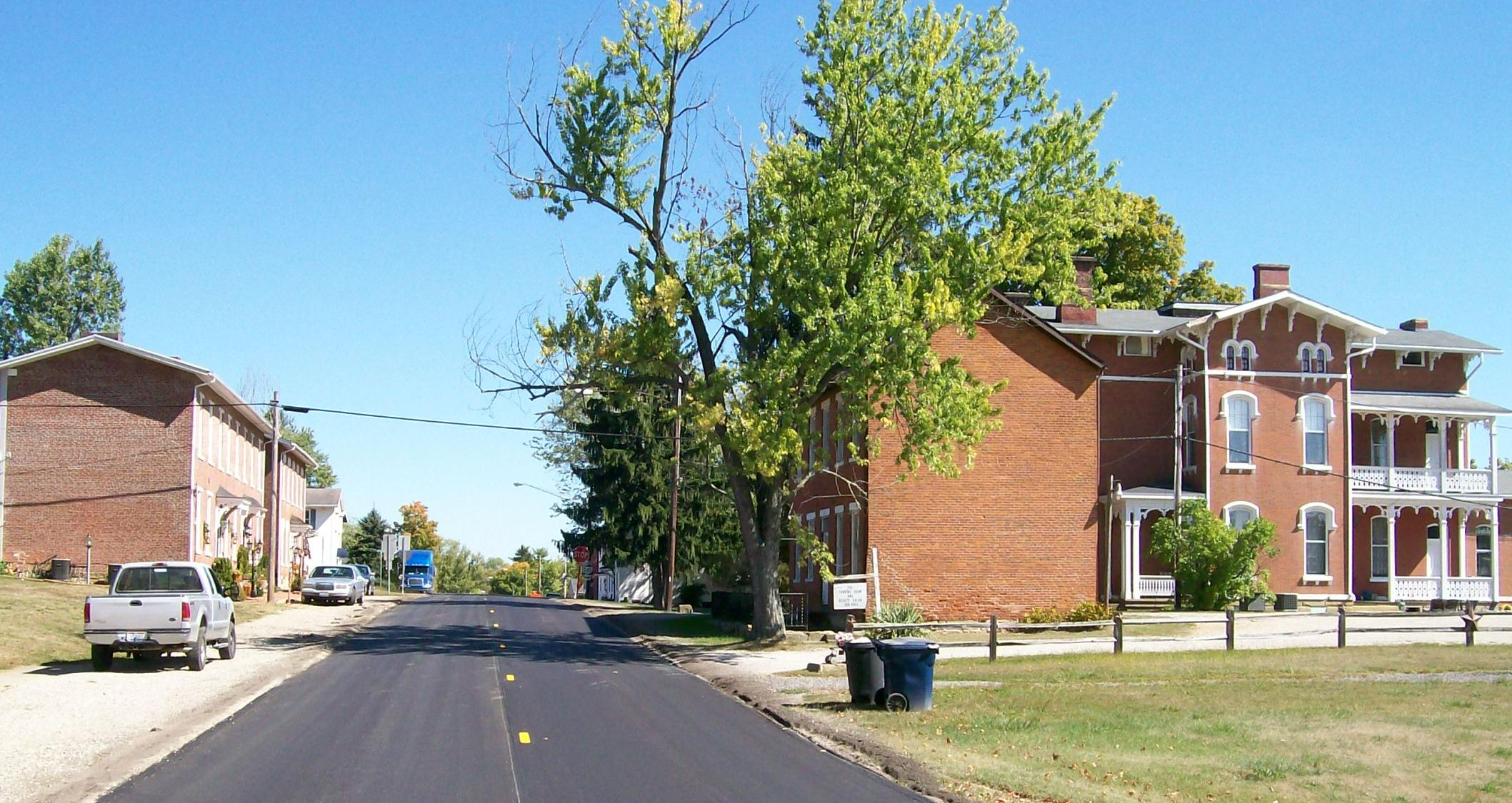
- Downtown Old Washington
- Interactive map of Old Washington, Ohio
- Location within Ohio Location within the United States
- Coordinates: 40°02′15″N 81°26′39″W
- Country: United States
- State: Ohio
- County: Guernsey
- Township: Wills

Area
  - Total: 0.67 sq mi (1.74 km^{2})
  - Land: 0.67 sq mi (1.74 km^{2})
  - Water: 0 sq mi (0.00 km^{2})
- Elevation: 1,004 ft (306 m)

Population (2020)
  - Total: 223
  - Density: 332.0/sq mi (128.17/km^{2})
- Time zone: UTC-5 (Eastern (EST))
  - Summer (DST): UTC-4 (EDT)
- ZIP code: 43768
- Area code: 740
- FIPS code: 39-58226
- GNIS feature ID: 2399570

Old Washington is a village in Guernsey County, Ohio, United States. The population was 223 at the 2020 census.

== History ==
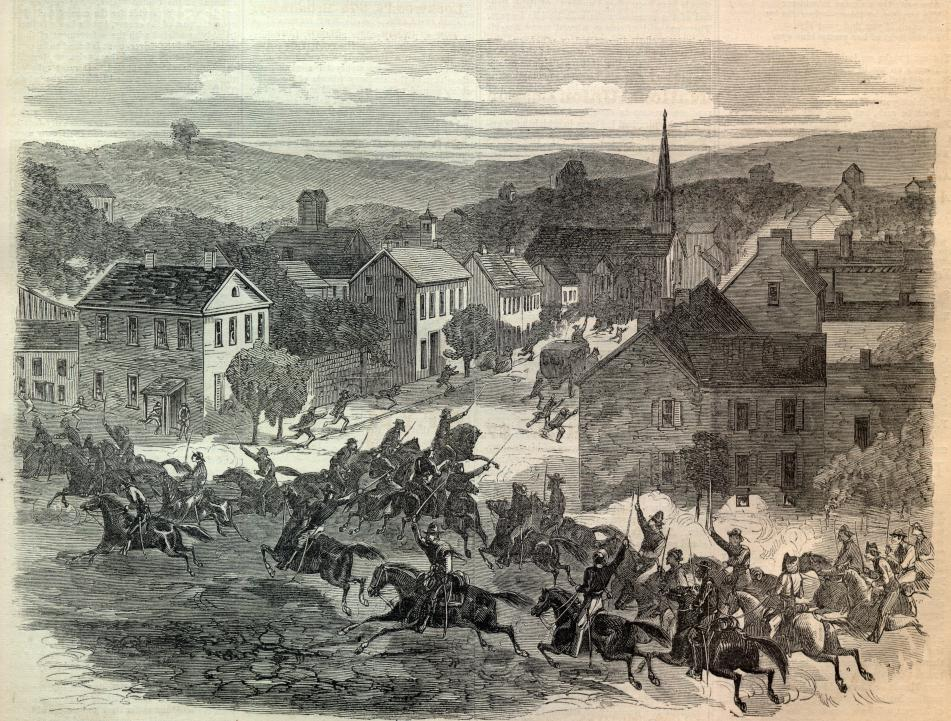
An illustration of Morgan's Raid entering Old Washington in Harper's Weekly, 1863

The village has been known by several names in its history. Platted by George and Henry Beymer in 1805, it was initially known by two names; Beymerstown and New Washington. It was incorporated as Washington in 1829, soon after the National Road reached it. The present name was later adopted to mitigate postal confusion with the City of Washington, now known as City of Washington Court House in Fayette County.

In July 1863, Old Washington was the site of a small engagement during the course of Morgan's Raid. In the course of their campaign through Ohio, the Confederate raiders appeared in several Guernsey County villages, including Old Washington, where they wreaked havoc before being caught by Union cavalry. The three Confederate dead are buried at the cemetery in Old Washington.

== Geography ==
According to the United States Census Bureau, the village has a total area of 0.67 square miles (1.74 km^{2}), all land.

== Demographics ==
Historical population
Census	Pop.	Note	%±
1820	161		—
1830	372		131.1%
1850	759		—
1860	741		−2.4%
1870	554		−25.2%
1880	600		8.3%
1890	546		−9.0%
1900	374		−31.5%
1910	366		−2.1%
1920	383		4.6%
1930	336		−12.3%
1940	297		−11.6%
1950	322		8.4%
1960	369		14.6%
1970	346		−6.2%
1980	279		−19.4%
1990	281		0.7%
2000	265		−5.7%
2010	279		5.3%
2020	223		−20.1%
U.S. Decennial Census

=== 2010 census ===
As of the census of 2010, there were 279 people, 111 households, and 86 families living in the village. The population density was 416.4 inhabitants per square mile (160.8/km^{2}). There were 119 housing units at an average density of 177.6 per square mile (68.6/km^{2}). The racial makeup of the village was 98.9% White, 0.4% Native American, and 0.7% from two or more races. Hispanic or Latino of any race were 1.4% of the population.

There were 111 households, of which 27.9% had children under the age of 18 living with them, 62.2% were married couples living together, 10.8% had a female householder with no husband present, 4.5% had a male householder with no wife present, and 22.5% were non-families. 18.9% of all households were made up of individuals, and 10.8% had someone living alone who was 65 years of age or older. The average household size was 2.51 and the average family size was 2.80.

The median age in the village was 40.1 years. 21.9% of residents were under the age of 18; 8.3% were between the ages of 18 and 24; 26.3% were from 25 to 44; 24% were from 45 to 64; and 19.7% were 65 years of age or older. The gender makeup of the village was 52.3% male and 47.7% female.

=== 2000 census ===
As of the census of 2000, there were 265 people, 112 households, and 82 families living in the village. The population density was 403.2 inhabitants per square mile (155.7/km^{2}). There were 124 housing units at an average density of 188.7 per square mile (72.9/km^{2}). The racial makeup of the village was 96.60% White, 1.89% African American, and 1.51% Asian. Hispanic or Latino of any race were 0.38% of the population.

There were 112 households, out of which 28.6% had children under the age of 18 living with them, 63.4% were married couples living together, 7.1% had a female householder with no husband present, and 25.9% were non-families. 24.1% of all households were made up of individuals, and 12.5% had someone living alone who was 65 years of age or older. The average household size was 2.37 and the average family size was 2.78.

In the village, the population was spread out, with 23.4% under the age of 18, 4.5% from 18 to 24, 25.7% from 25 to 44, 27.9% from 45 to 64, and 18.5% who were 65 years of age or older. The median age was 43 years. For every 100 females, there were 80.3 males. For every 100 females age 18 and over, there were 82.9 males.

The median income for a household in the village was $26,250, and the median income for a family was $31,667. Males had a median income of $31,406 versus $23,125 for females. The per capita income for the village was $24,399. About 7.8% of families and 13.9% of the population were below the poverty line, including 23.1% of those under the age of eighteen and 21.3% of those 65 or over.

== Education ==
Old Washington is within the East Guernsey Local School District. Students within the village attend Buckeye Trail High School, Buckeye Trail Middle School, and Buckeye Trail Elementary School.
