= Guernsey County, Ohio =

County in the United States

- County
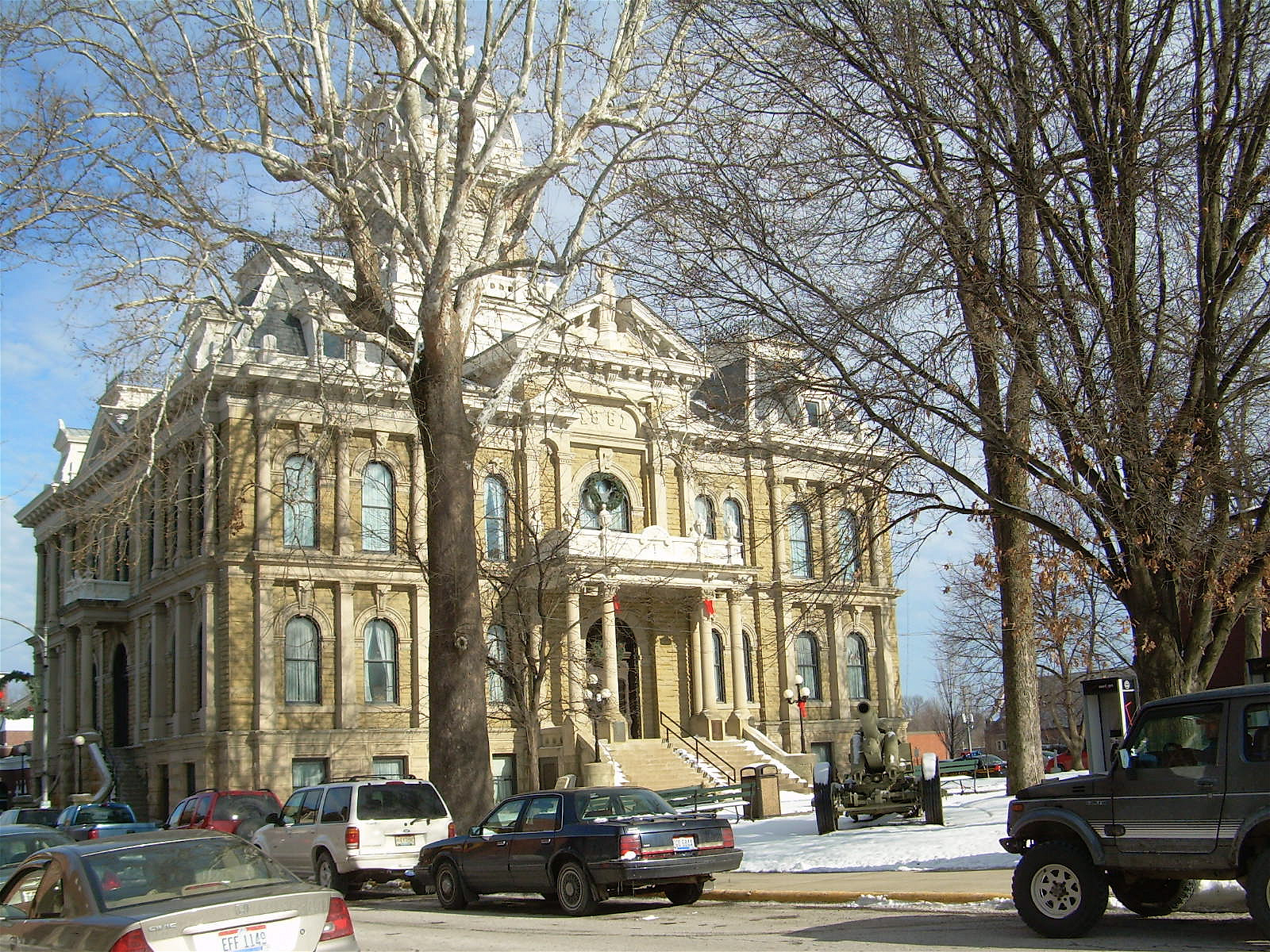
- Guernsey County Courthouse

- Flag Seal

- Location within the U.S. state of Ohio
- Coordinates: 40°03′N 81°30′W
- Country: United States
- State: Ohio
- Founded: January 31, 1810
- Named for: Isle of Guernsey
- Seat: Cambridge
- Largest city: Cambridge

Area
  - Total: 528 sq mi (1,370 km^{2})
  - Land: 522 sq mi (1,350 km^{2})
  - Water: 6.0 sq mi (16 km^{2}) 1.1%

Population (2020)
  - Total: 38,438
  - Estimate (2025): 38,379 ▼
  - Density: 73.2/sq mi (28.3/km^{2})
- Time zone: UTC−5 (Eastern)
  - Summer (DST): UTC−4 (EDT)
- Congressional district: 12th
- Website: guernseycounty.gov

Guernsey County is a county located in the east-central portion of the U.S. state of Ohio. As of the 2020 census, the population was 38,438. Its county seat and largest city is Cambridge. It is named from the Isle of Guernsey in the English Channel, from which many of the county's early settlers emigrated.

Guernsey County comprises the Cambridge, OH Micropolitan Statistical Area, which is also included in the Columbus-Marion-Zanesville, OH Combined Statistical Area.

== History ==
Guernsey County, located in the Appalachian foothills, was first formed and organized on March 10, 1810, from portions of Muskingum and Belmont counties by the Ohio Legislature. The first county commissioners were sworn in on April 23, 1810. It lost some land during the formation of neighboring counties until it reached its present boundaries in 1851, when Buffalo, Beaver, Olive, and Seneca townships were gained by Noble County. After a dispute whether the county seat should be Cambridge or Washington, it was established in Cambridge after two individuals proposed to donate the land and furnish the public buildings if built there.

== Geography ==
According to the U.S. Census Bureau, the county has a total area of 528 square miles (1,370 km^{2}), of which 522 square miles (1,350 km^{2}) is land and 6.0 square miles (16 km^{2}) (1.1%) is water.

=== Adjacent counties ===
- Tuscarawas County (north)
- Coshocton County (northwest)
- Harrison County (northeast)
- Noble County (south)
- Muskingum County (west)
- Belmont County (east)

== Demographics ==
Historical population
Census	Pop.	Note	%±
1810	3,051		—
1820	9,292		204.6%
1830	18,036		94.1%
1840	27,748		53.8%
1850	30,438		9.7%
1860	24,474		−19.6%
1870	23,838		−2.6%
1880	27,197		14.1%
1890	28,645		5.3%
1900	34,425		20.2%
1910	42,716		24.1%
1920	45,352		6.2%
1930	41,486		−8.5%
1940	38,822		−6.4%
1950	38,452		−1.0%
1960	38,579		0.3%
1970	37,665		−2.4%
1980	42,024		11.6%
1990	39,024		−7.1%
2000	40,792		4.5%
2010	40,087		−1.7%
2020	38,438		−4.1%
2025 (est.)	38,379	▼	−0.2%
U.S. Decennial Census; 1790-1960 1900-1990; 1990-2000 2020

=== 2020 census ===
As of the 2020 census, the county had a population of 38,438. The median age was 43.2 years. 21.7% of residents were under the age of 18 and 20.7% of residents were 65 years of age or older. For every 100 females there were 97.1 males, and for every 100 females age 18 and over there were 95.8 males age 18 and over.

The racial makeup of the county was 93.4% White, 1.4% Black or African American, 0.2% American Indian and Alaska Native, 0.4% Asian, <0.1% Native Hawaiian and Pacific Islander, 0.5% from some other race, and 4.1% from two or more races. Hispanic or Latino residents of any race comprised 1.2% of the population.

37.5% of residents lived in urban areas, while 62.5% lived in rural areas.

There were 16,100 households in the county, of which 26.9% had children under the age of 18 living in them. Of all households, 44.8% were married-couple households, 19.8% were households with a male householder and no spouse or partner present, and 26.8% were households with a female householder and no spouse or partner present. About 30.8% of all households were made up of individuals and 14.1% had someone living alone who was 65 years of age or older.

There were 19,009 housing units, of which 15.3% were vacant. Among occupied housing units, 70.6% were owner-occupied and 29.4% were renter-occupied. The homeowner vacancy rate was 2.2% and the rental vacancy rate was 10.3%.

=== Racial and ethnic composition ===
Guernsey County, Ohio – Racial and ethnic composition Note: the US Census treats Hispanic/Latino as an ethnic category. This table excludes Latinos from the racial categories and assigns them to a separate category. Hispanics/Latinos may be of any race.
Race / Ethnicity (NH = Non-Hispanic)	Pop 1980	Pop 1990	Pop 2000	Pop 2010	Pop 2020	% 1980	% 1990	% 2000	% 2010	% 2020
White alone (NH)	41,002	38,062	39,108	38,276	35,717	97.57%	97.53%	95.87%	95.48%	92.92%
Black or African American alone (NH)	637	613	622	580	520	1.52%	1.57%	1.52%	1.45%	1.35%
Native American or Alaska Native alone (NH)	30	70	118	86	87	0.07%	0.18%	0.29%	0.21%	0.23%
Asian alone (NH)	134	132	121	109	149	0.32%	0.34%	0.30%	0.27%	0.39%
Native Hawaiian or Pacific Islander alone (NH)	x	x	2	8	7	x	x	0.00%	0.02%	0.02%
Other race alone (NH)	56	17	39	26	65	0.13%	0.04%	0.10%	0.06%	0.17%
Mixed race or Multiracial (NH)	x	x	528	653	1,449	x	x	1.29%	1.63%	3.77%
Hispanic or Latino (any race)	165	130	254	349	444	0.39%	0.33%	0.62%	0.87%	1.16%
Total	42,024	39,024	40,792	40,087	38,438	100.00%	100.00%	100.00%	100.00%	100.00%

=== 2010 census ===
As of the 2010 United States census, there were 40,087 people, 16,210 households, and 10,949 families living in the county. The population density was 76.8 inhabitants per square mile (29.7/km^{2}). There were 19,193 housing units at an average density of 36.8 units per square mile (14.2 units/km^{2}). The racial makeup of the county was 96.0% white, 1.5% black or African American, 0.3% Asian, 0.2% American Indian, 0.2% from other races, and 1.8% from two or more races. Those of Hispanic or Latino origin made up 0.9% of the population. In terms of ancestry, 22.3% were German, 15.2% were Irish, 12.4% were English, and 9.6% were American.

Of the 16,210 households, 31.1% had children under the age of 18 living with them, 49.8% were married couples living together, 12.3% had a female householder with no husband present, 32.5% were non-families, and 27.7% of all households were made up of individuals. The average household size was 2.44 and the average family size was 2.95. The median age was 40.9 years.

The median income for a household in the county was $37,573 and the median income for a family was $48,445. Males had a median income of $37,642 versus $29,348 for females. The per capita income for the county was $19,187. About 13.6% of families and 17.3% of the population were below the poverty line, including 26.7% of those under age 18 and 9.5% of those age 65 or over.

=== 2000 census ===
As of the census of 2000, there were 40,792 people, 16,094 households, and 11,233 families living in the county. The population density was 78 inhabitants per square mile (30/km^{2}). There were 18,771 housing units at an average density of 36 units per square mile (14/km^{2}). The racial makeup of the county was 96.28% White, 1.53% Black or African American, 0.31% Native American, 0.30% Asian, 0.22% from other races, and 1.36% from two or more races. 0.62% of the population were Hispanic or Latino of any race. 96.7% spoke English, 1.3% Spanish and 1.1% German as their first language.

There were 16,094 households, out of which 32.40% had children under the age of 18 living with them, 53.90% were married couples living together, 11.40% had a female householder with no husband present, and 30.20% were non-families. 26.10% of all households were made up of individuals, and 11.20% had someone living alone who was 65 years of age or older. The average household size was 2.50 and the average family size was 3.00.

In the county, the population was spread out, with 26.20% under the age of 18, 7.90% from 18 to 24, 27.50% from 25 to 44, 24.00% from 45 to 64, and 14.50% who were 65 years of age or older. The median age was 38 years. For every 100 females there were 94.50 males. For every 100 females age 18 and over, there were 91.40 males.

The median income for a household in the county was $30,110, and the median income for a family was $35,660. Males had a median income of $30,142 versus $20,804 for females. The per capita income for the county was $15,542. About 12.90% of families and 16.00% of the population were below the poverty line, including 21.50% of those under age 18 and 12.30% of those age 65 or over.

== Politics ==
Guernsey County has been dominated by Republican Party candidates in presidential elections, with Democrats only winning the county in six presidential elections from 1856 on. The most recent Democrat to win the county was Bill Clinton in 1996.

United States presidential election results for Guernsey County, Ohio
Year	Republican		Democratic		Third party(ies)	
Year	No.	%	No.	%	No.	%
1856	2,392	52.76%	1,932	42.61%	210	4.63%
1860	2,510	55.18%	1,933	42.49%	106	2.33%
1864	2,677	57.52%	1,977	42.48%	0	0.00%
1868	2,743	58.46%	1,949	41.54%	0	0.00%
1872	2,629	57.78%	1,901	41.78%	20	0.44%
1876	3,106	55.60%	2,460	44.04%	20	0.36%
1880	3,318	55.78%	2,568	43.17%	62	1.04%
1884	3,409	55.18%	2,570	41.60%	199	3.22%
1888	3,560	54.40%	2,520	38.51%	464	7.09%
1892	3,439	53.53%	2,510	39.07%	476	7.41%
1896	4,337	55.78%	3,258	41.90%	180	2.32%
1900	5,014	59.44%	3,120	36.99%	301	3.57%
1904	5,427	62.89%	2,448	28.37%	755	8.75%
1908	5,210	53.92%	3,449	35.69%	1,004	10.39%
1912	3,426	37.68%	2,726	29.98%	2,940	32.34%
1916	4,228	44.76%	4,312	45.65%	906	9.59%
1920	8,764	54.36%	6,888	42.72%	470	2.92%
1924	8,997	59.56%	3,604	23.86%	2,505	16.58%
1928	11,174	74.10%	3,709	24.60%	197	1.31%
1932	8,750	48.33%	9,026	49.85%	330	1.82%
1936	8,532	42.51%	11,404	56.82%	134	0.67%
1940	10,125	53.76%	8,710	46.24%	0	0.00%
1944	8,878	57.69%	6,512	42.31%	0	0.00%
1948	7,651	53.21%	6,639	46.17%	90	0.63%
1952	9,749	59.52%	6,631	40.48%	0	0.00%
1956	10,224	66.51%	5,149	33.49%	0	0.00%
1960	10,396	61.41%	6,532	38.59%	0	0.00%
1964	6,429	40.35%	9,503	59.65%	0	0.00%
1968	7,336	49.44%	5,815	39.19%	1,686	11.36%
1972	9,648	66.00%	4,757	32.54%	214	1.46%
1976	7,746	49.90%	7,573	48.78%	205	1.32%
1980	8,180	58.08%	5,121	36.36%	783	5.56%
1984	10,252	66.81%	4,967	32.37%	125	0.81%
1988	8,507	58.42%	5,926	40.69%	130	0.89%
1992	5,749	35.17%	6,428	39.32%	4,171	25.51%
1996	5,970	39.52%	6,731	44.55%	2,407	15.93%
2000	8,181	53.02%	6,643	43.05%	606	3.93%
2004	9,962	55.84%	7,768	43.54%	110	0.62%
2008	9,197	52.93%	7,625	43.88%	553	3.18%
2012	8,993	53.37%	7,450	44.22%	406	2.41%
2016	11,445	68.75%	4,359	26.18%	843	5.06%
2020	13,407	73.41%	4,577	25.06%	280	1.53%
2024	13,314	75.54%	4,154	23.57%	158	0.90%

United States Senate election results for Guernsey County, Ohio1
Year	Republican		Democratic		Third party(ies)	
Year	No.	%	No.	%	No.	%
2024	11,836	68.07%	4,839	27.83%	712	4.10%

== Communities ==
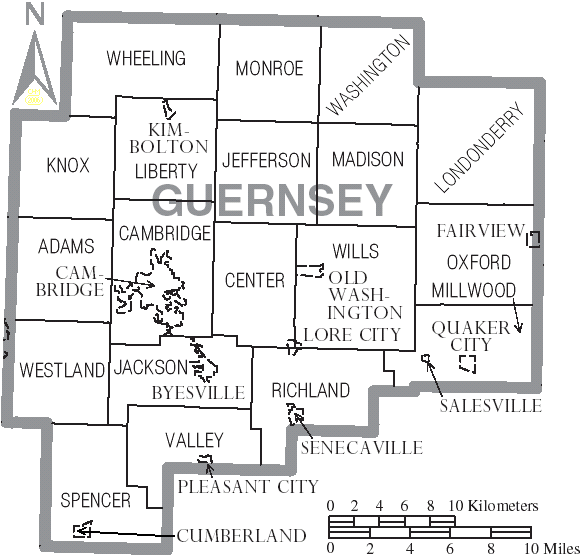
Map of Guernsey County, Ohio With Municipal and Township Labels

=== City ===
- Cambridge (county seat)

=== Villages ===
- Byesville
- Cumberland
- Fairview
- Lore City
- Old Washington
- Pleasant City
- Quaker City
- Senecaville

=== Townships ===
- Adams
- Cambridge
- Center
- Jackson
- Jefferson
- Knox
- Liberty
- Londonderry
- Madison
- Millwood
- Monroe
- Oxford
- Richland
- Spencer
- Valley
- Washington
- Westland
- Wheeling
- Wills

=== Census-designated places ===
- Buffalo
- Kimbolton
- Salesville

=== Unincorporated communities ===
- Antrim
- Birmingham
- Claysville
- Derwent
- Elizabethtown
- Guernsey
- Kings Mine
- Kipling
- Opperman
- Walhonding

== See also ==
- Big Muskie
- Guernsey County Courthouse
- National Register of Historic Places listings in Guernsey County, Ohio
