= List of historic properties in Queen Creek, Arizona =

- City
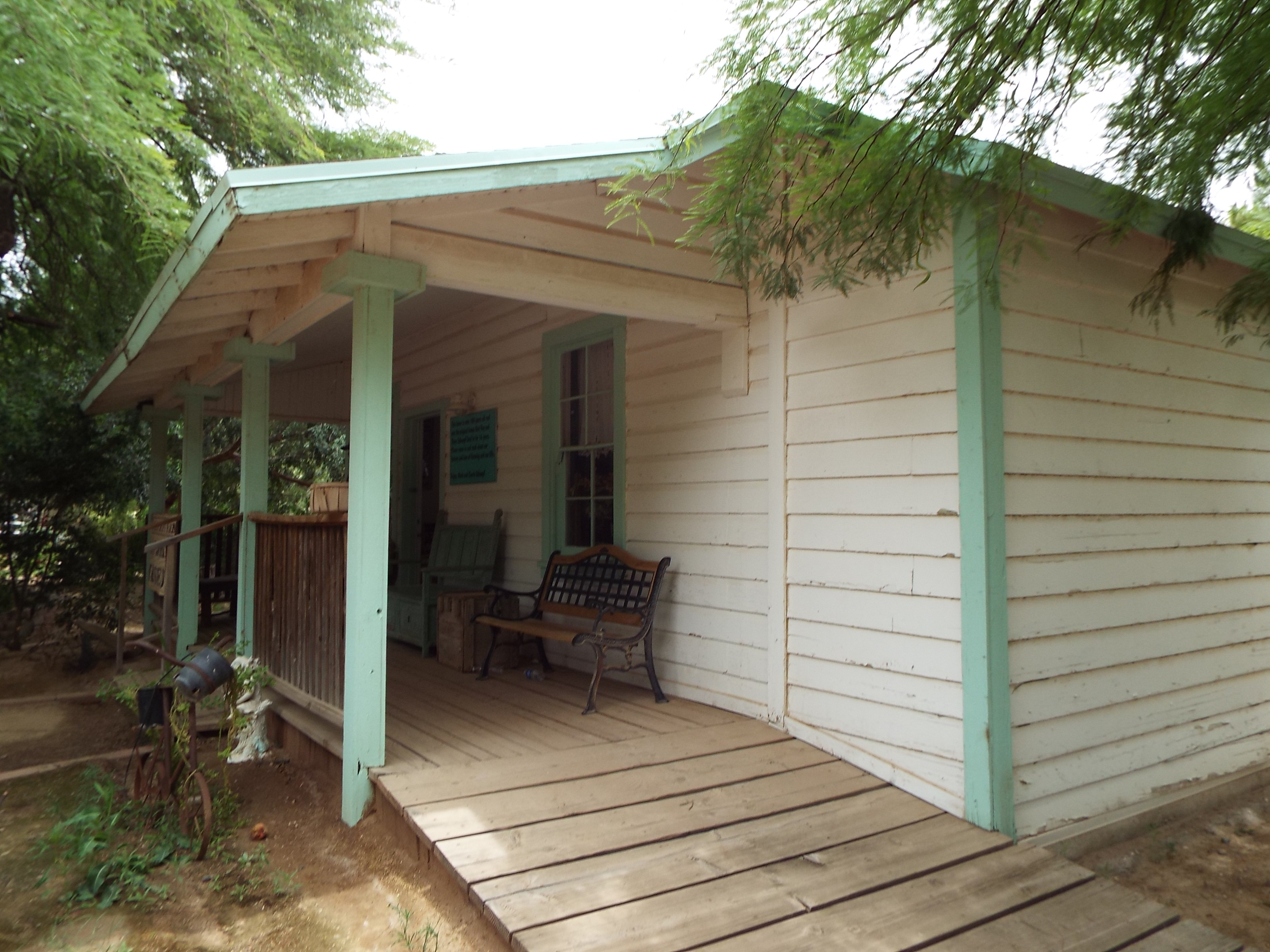
- The Schnepf House

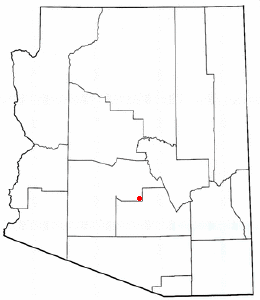
- Location in Maricopa County and the state of Arizona

This is a list, which includes a photographic gallery, of some of the structures of historic significance in Queen Creek, Arizona. Part of the town is located in Maricopa County and the other part in Pinal County.

== History ==
The Valley below the San Tan Mountains had fertile lands. This attracted the Hohokam, a Native American tribe, who were the first to establish communities in the area. The homesteaders then arrived and began to establish farms and ranches along what was called the Queen Creek Wash.

In 1924, Charles Rittenhouse, a land developer, established the Queen Creek Farms Company. The wells in his company pumped 2,150 gallons of water per minute, which helped make his 1,000 acres of land very productive. A railroad was soon established in the area and a small town grew around the railroad where it could ship the produce and cotton which grew on the farms. The town was called Rittenhouse because the Railroad ran near Rittenhouse and Ellsworth roads. The residents of the area, wanting to travel to Phoenix by train, would often flag down the train to get a ride.

In the eastern part of Arizona, there is a mountain where the Silver King Mine is located. There is a creek at the base of the mountain which was called Picket Post Creek. Eventually, the creek's name was changed to Queen Creek. The creek ran from the mountain and into the area of Rittenhouse.

It wasn't long before the farmers began to rely more on the use of automobiles and trucks than on the railroad. The use of the railroad declined and the people began to call and identify the area as Queen Creek. The town's name officially was changed to Queen Creek in 1947, with the establishment of the Queen Creek Post Office. The town, which was incorporated in 1989, has the unique distinction of having part of the town located within Maricopa County and another part within Pinal County.

Immigrants from Mexico moved into the area and picked the local cotton crop by hand until the 1920s when the cotton gin came to Queen Creek. In the 1940s the United States set up a German prisoner-of-war camp by Rittenhouse Road. The prisoners, together with immigrants from the Philippines, worked as farm laborers in local fields.

In 1990, members of the community established the San Tan Historical Society. The mission of the society is to preserve the area's heritage. The society collects, preserves, documents, and displays the histories and artifacts of the Chandler Heights, Combs, Higley, and Queen Creek Communities. Various properties in the town of Queen Creek are considered historical and have been included either in the National Register of Historic Places or listed as such by the San Tan Historical Society.

The Town of Queen Creek, however, lacks the authority to deny a demolition permit. Therefore, the owner of a property, listed either in the National Register of Historic Places or considered historical by the San Tan Historical Society, may demolish the historical property in question if they so desire. An example of this is the historic Water Tower which was built in 1952 for the Producers Cotton Gin. The water tower was to be demolished, but in 1999, the Schnepf family purchased it and moved it to the grounds of the Schnepf Farms. According to Jim McPherson, Arizona Preservation Foundation Board President: "It is crucial that residents, private interests, and government officials act now to save these elements of our cultural heritage before it is too late."

The historic Schnepf Farms is located five miles southeast of the town. The area was purchased by Jack and Maude Schnepf in 1941. They were among the first settlers to buy a cotton picker, put in cement ditches, and dig sumps to catch and recycle wastewater. Jack and Raymond Schnepf invented and manufactured the aluminum irrigation tube. As neighboring farm owners sold their properties to developers, the Schnepf Family purchased unique farm buildings from these neighboring farms and incorporated them into the Schnepf Farm to preserve the history of these farms.

== List ==
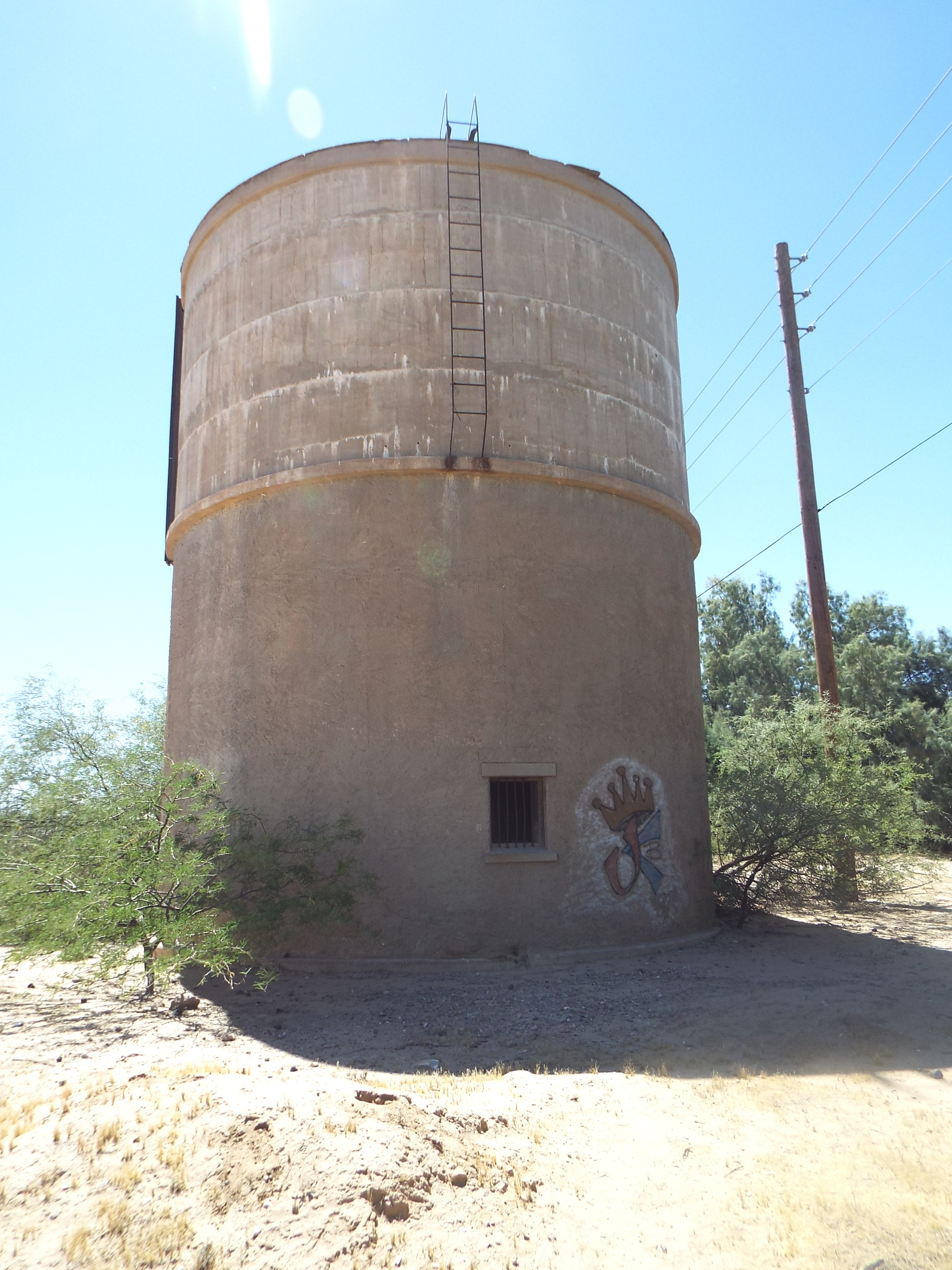
Railroad Water Tank

- The Old Rittenhouse Elementary School – located on the S.E. corner of Ellsworth and Queen Creek roads was built in 1925. Used as a school through 1982, this building now houses the San Tan Historical Society. Listed in the National Register of Historic Places in 1998. Reference 98000053
- Our Lady of Guadalupe – The first Catholic Church building in Queen Creek is located on the north side of Ocotillo, 3/8 mile west of Ellsworth Road.
- Queen Creek Historic Town Hall - was built in 1952 as a meeting house for the Church of Jesus Christ of Latter-day Saints, which stopped using it in 1988. The Town of Queen Creek bought it in 1991.
- The Desert Wells Stage Stop Ruins – Located just north of East Chandler Heights Road on the east side of South Sossaman Road, this site was a small spur stop for the Arizona Stage Company, founded in 1868. The stop provided water, shade, and protection for stages from Florence via Olberg and on to Mesa. The extant ruins are of the foundation of the water tank.
- The Community Church – This was the first church in what was then called "Rittenhouse", built in 1921. Located at 26800 South Mandarin Drive off of Hunt Highway, it is listed as historic by the San Tan Historical Society.
- The Arizona Boys Ranch – The Arizona Boys Ranch was established in 1951. It is now called Canyon State Academy.
- The Former Post Office Building – This building is reported to have been built in 1913 and to once have been the community's Post Office. The building is now used for commercial purposes and is located at 22030 S. Ellsworth Road.
- The Railroad Water Tank – The Railroad Water Tank on Rittenhouse Road was built in the early 1900s.
- The Schnepf House – The century-old house that once served as the home of Ray and Thora Schnepf. The house is located in the grounds of the Schnepf Farm at 22601 East Cloud Road.
- The Customer Service Farmhouse – A century-old house on the grounds of the historic Schnepf Farms.
- Water Tower – The historic water tower was built in 1952 for the Producers Cotton Gin. It was moved to the Schnepf Farms in 1999.
- The 1912 Parker Carousel – The Schnepf farm is home to the historic 1912 Parker Carousel. The carousel, built by C. W. Parker, has four of the original wooden horses. It was originally purchased from Wally Scott in Elk River, Minnesota in 1999 and moved to the Schnepf Farm.
- Hunt Highway – The historic highway, named after George W. P. Hunt the first governor of the "State" of Arizona, was built in 1913. It served travelers from the City of Phoenix to the town of Florence.
- The Pyramid House – Built in 1978, located at 34317 Goldmine Gulch Trail.

Also pictured is the gravesite of Mansel Carter and Marion E. Kennedy, located in what once was their campsite in Gold Mountain. The area is now within the boundaries of the San Tan Mountain Regional Park.

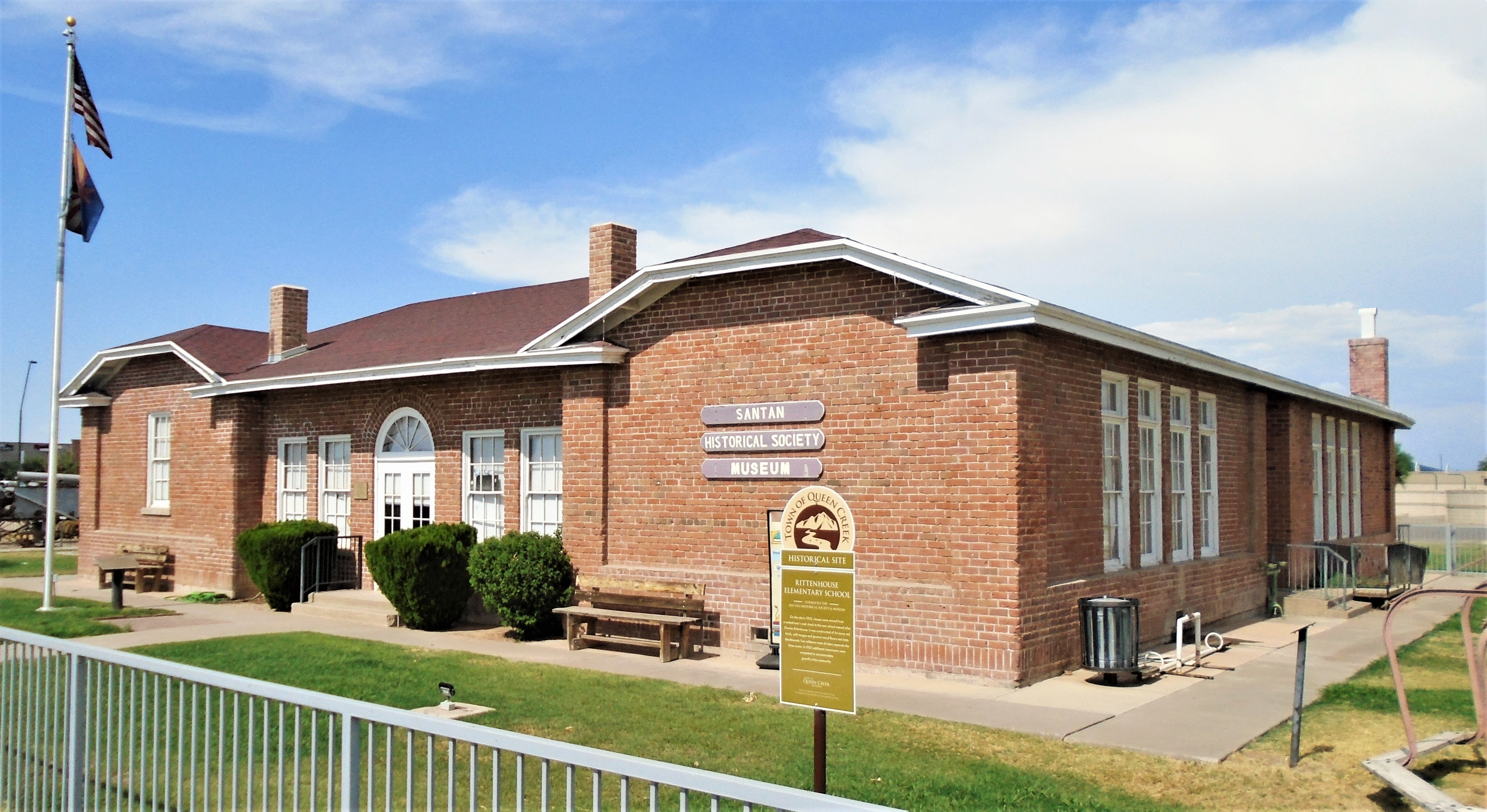
The Old Rittenhouse Elementary School (1925)

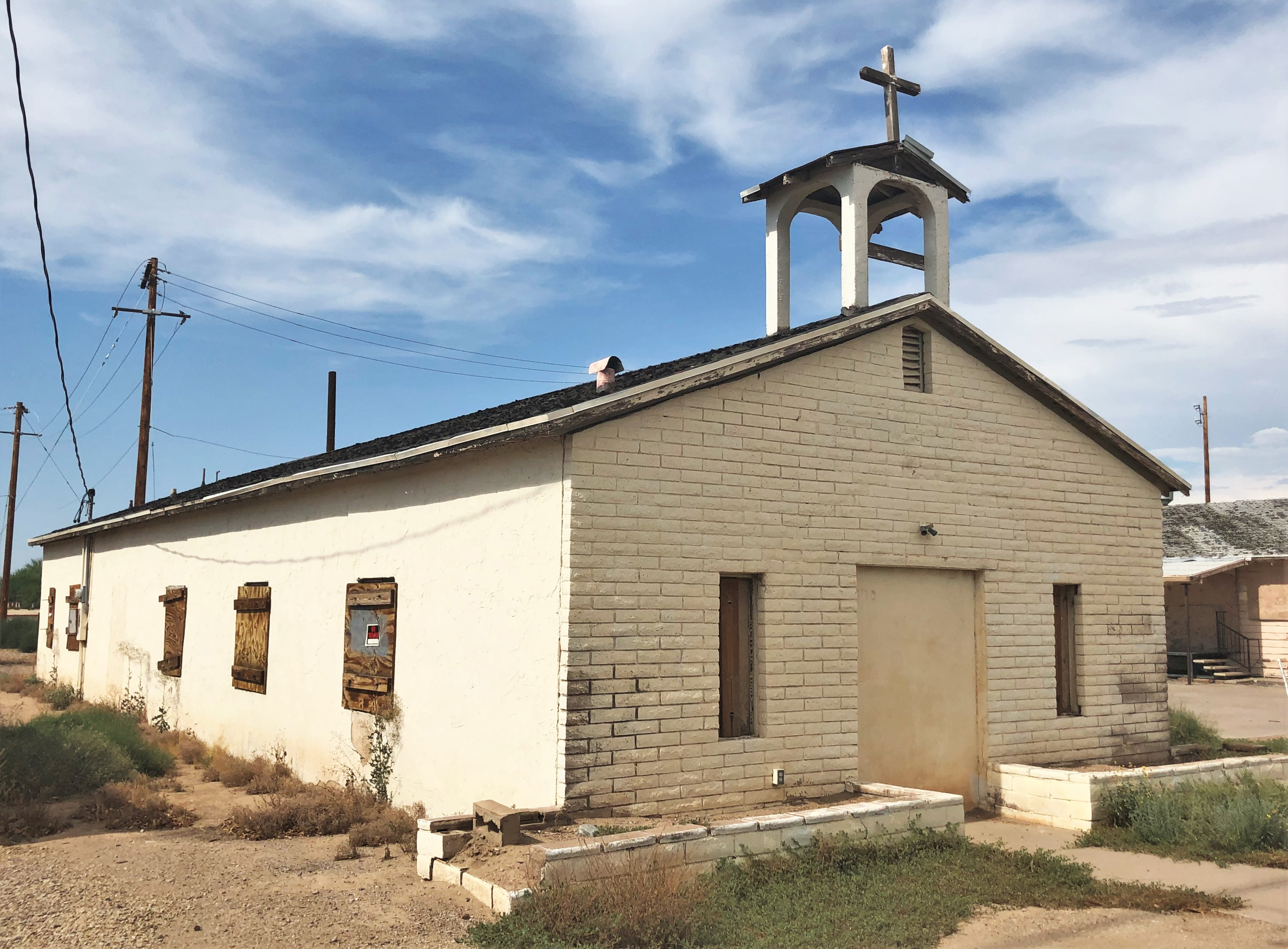
Old Our Lady of Guadalupe Church

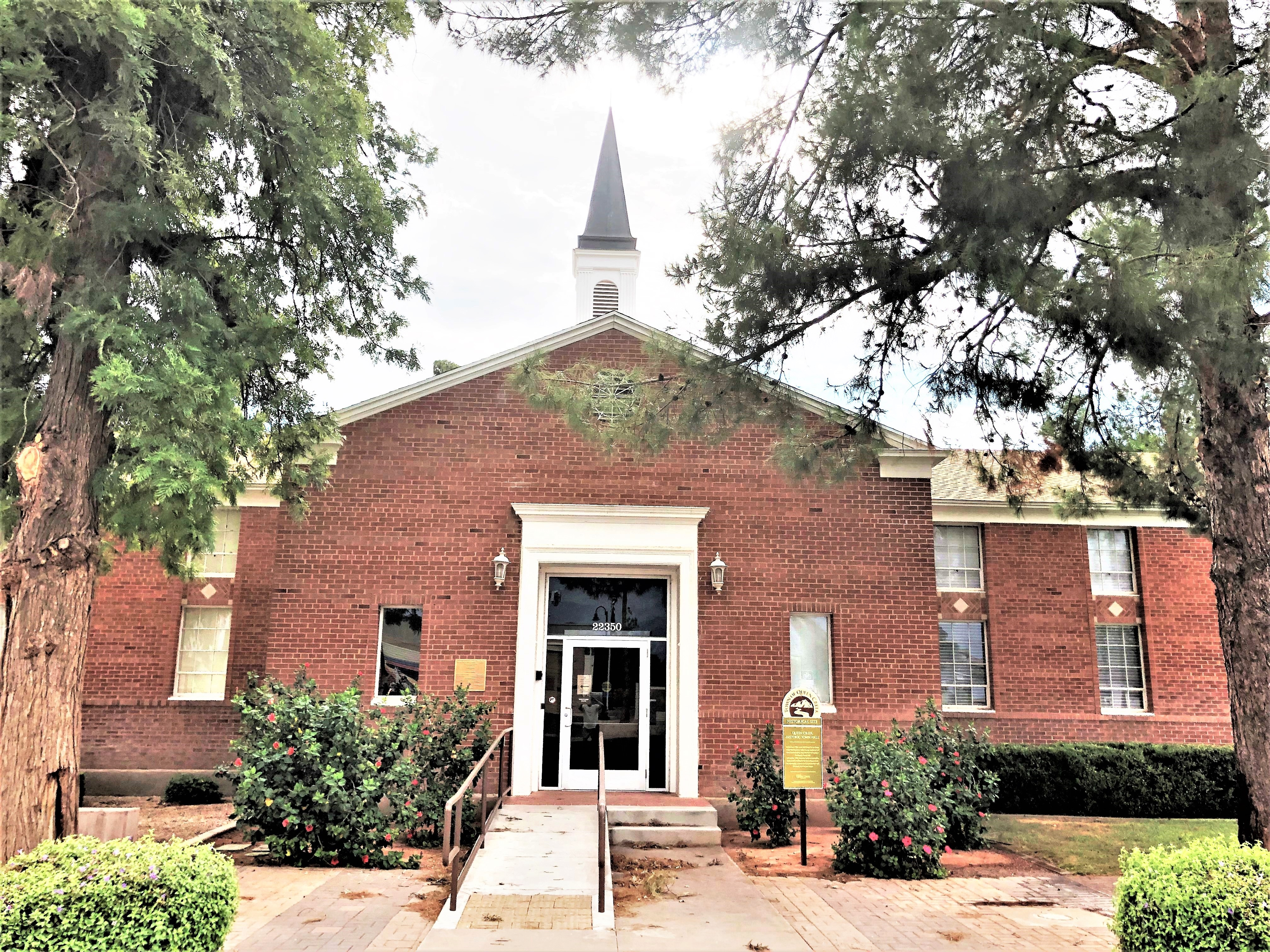
The Queen Creek Historic Town Hall is a former LDS church meetinghouse built in 1951

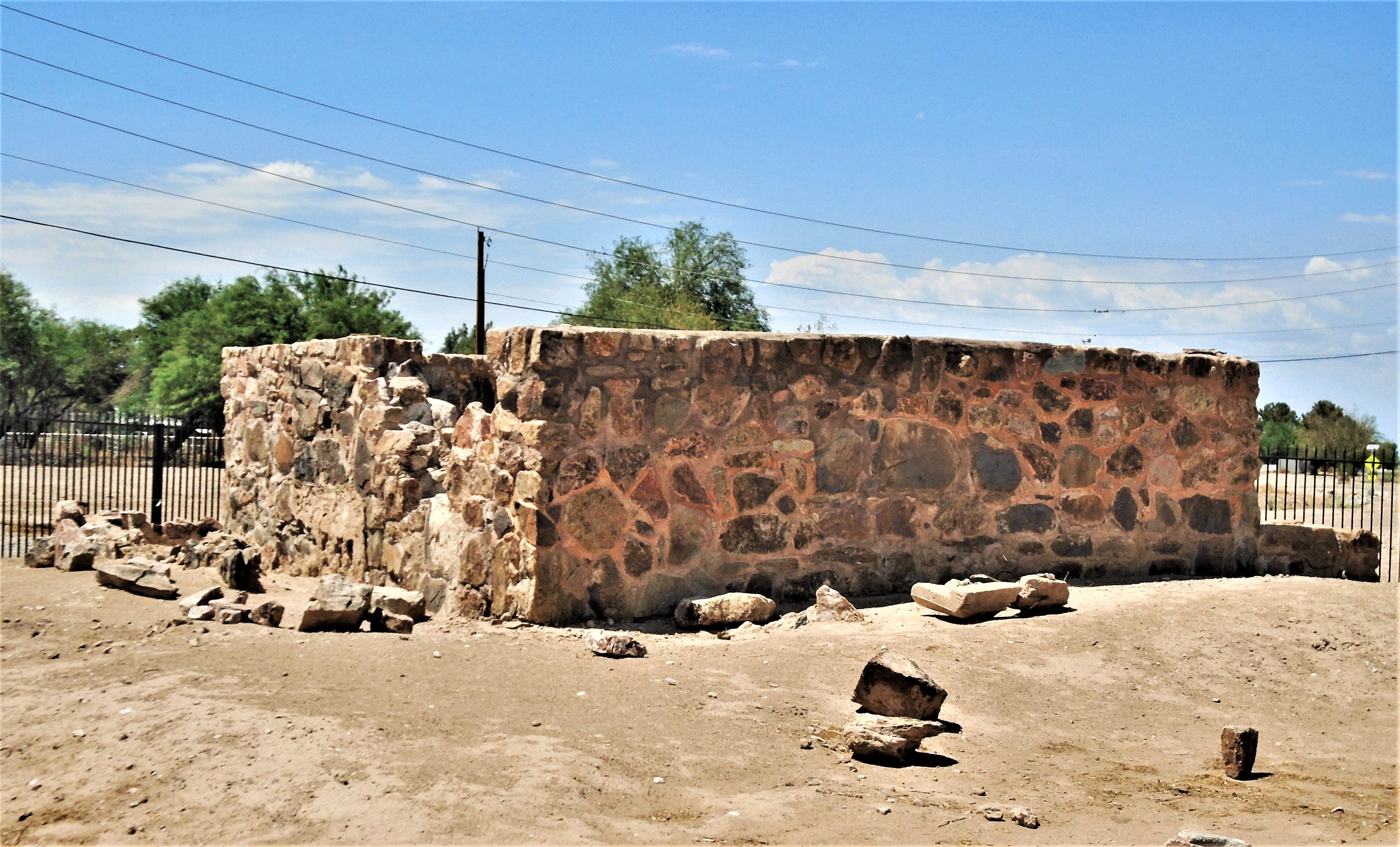
Ruins of the Desert Wells Stage Stop

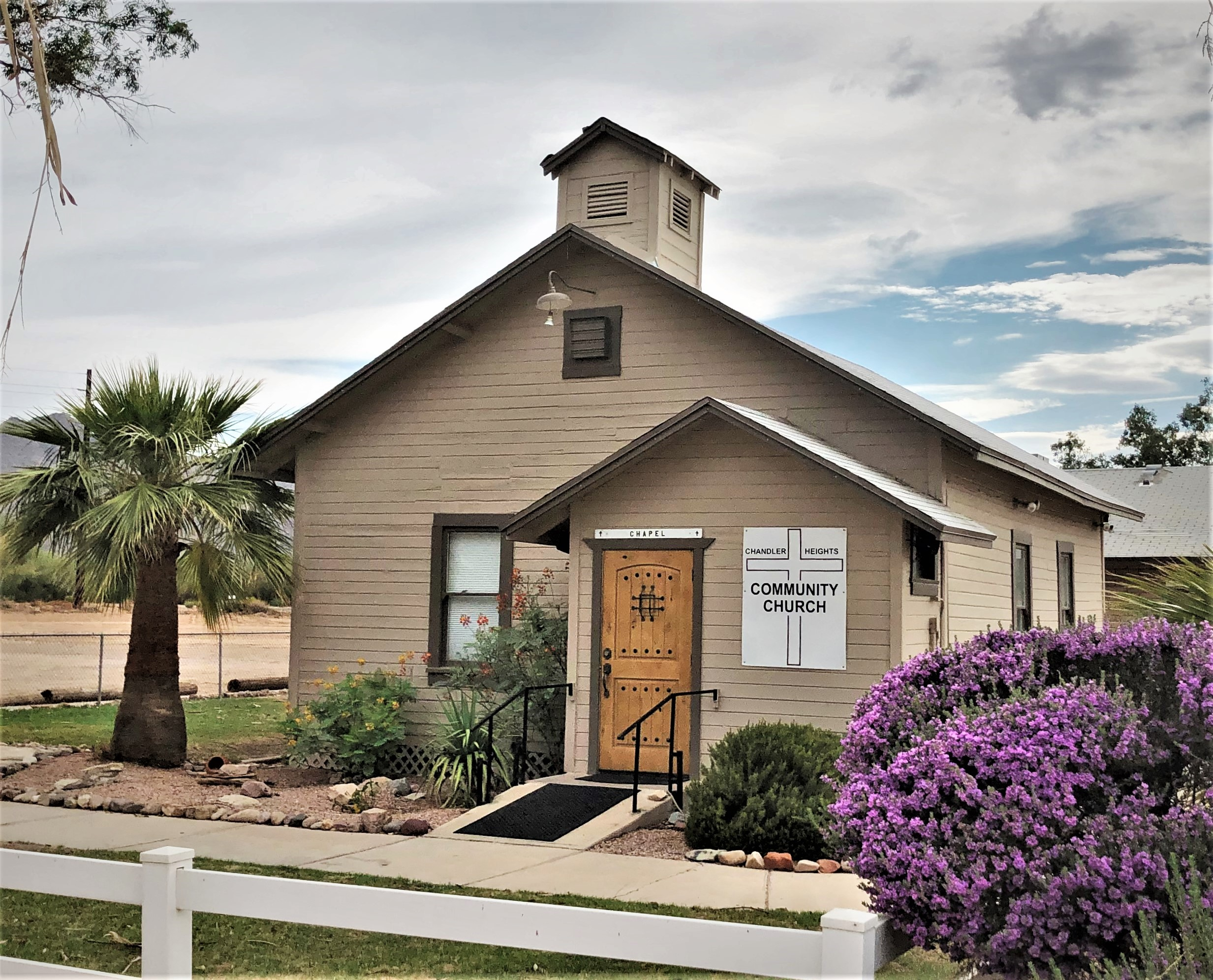
Chandler Heights Community Church (1921)

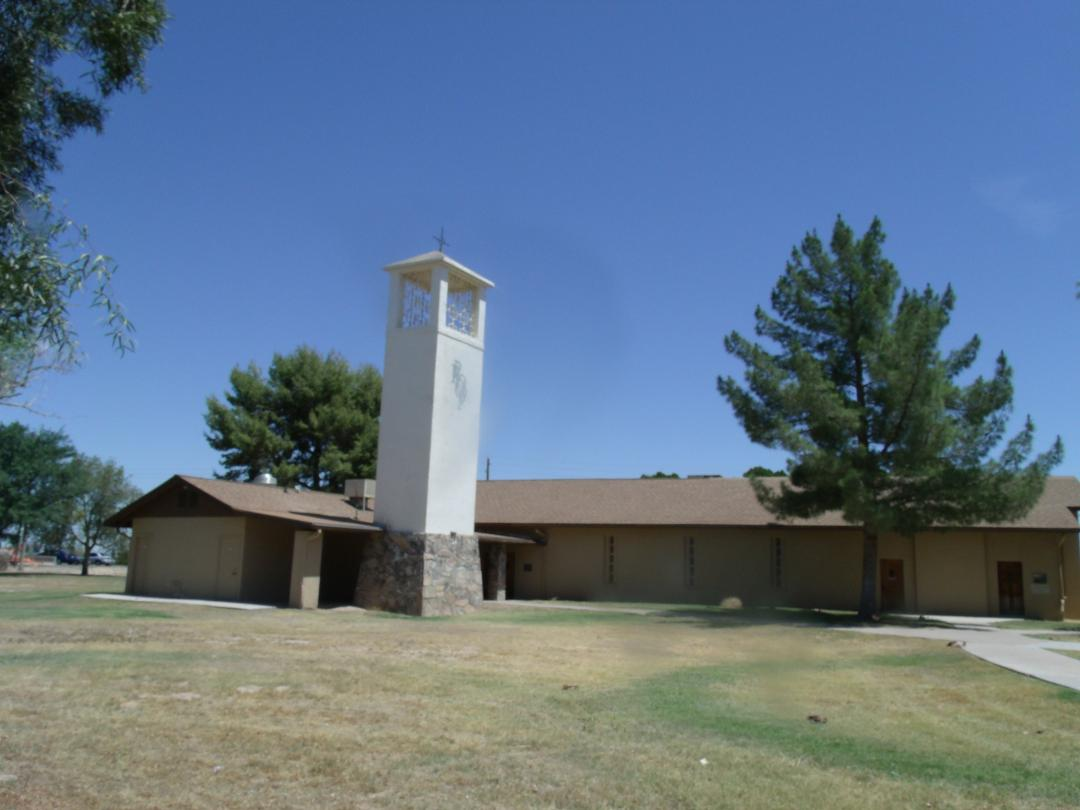
Arizona Boys Ranch (1951)

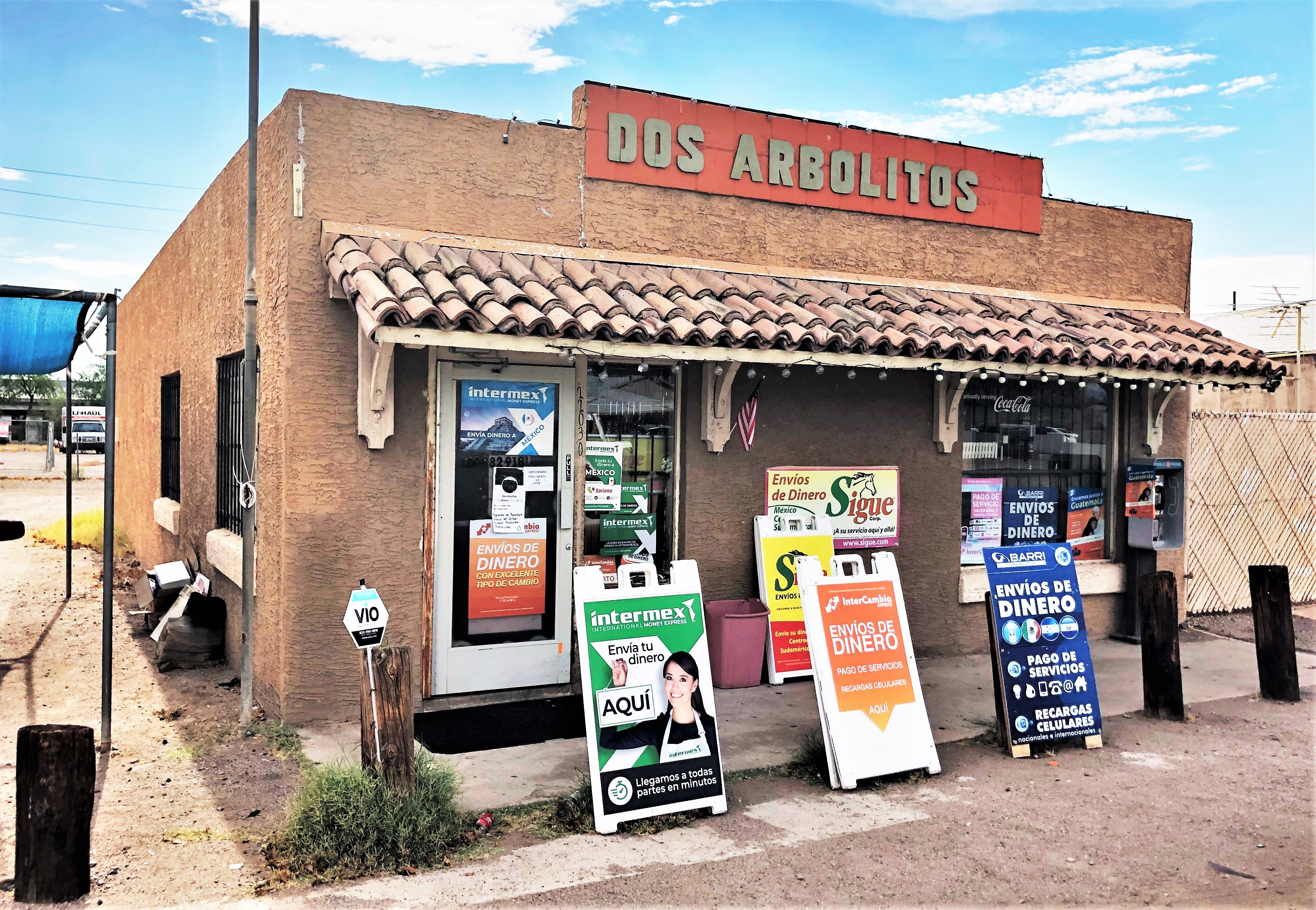
Former Post Office Building (1913)

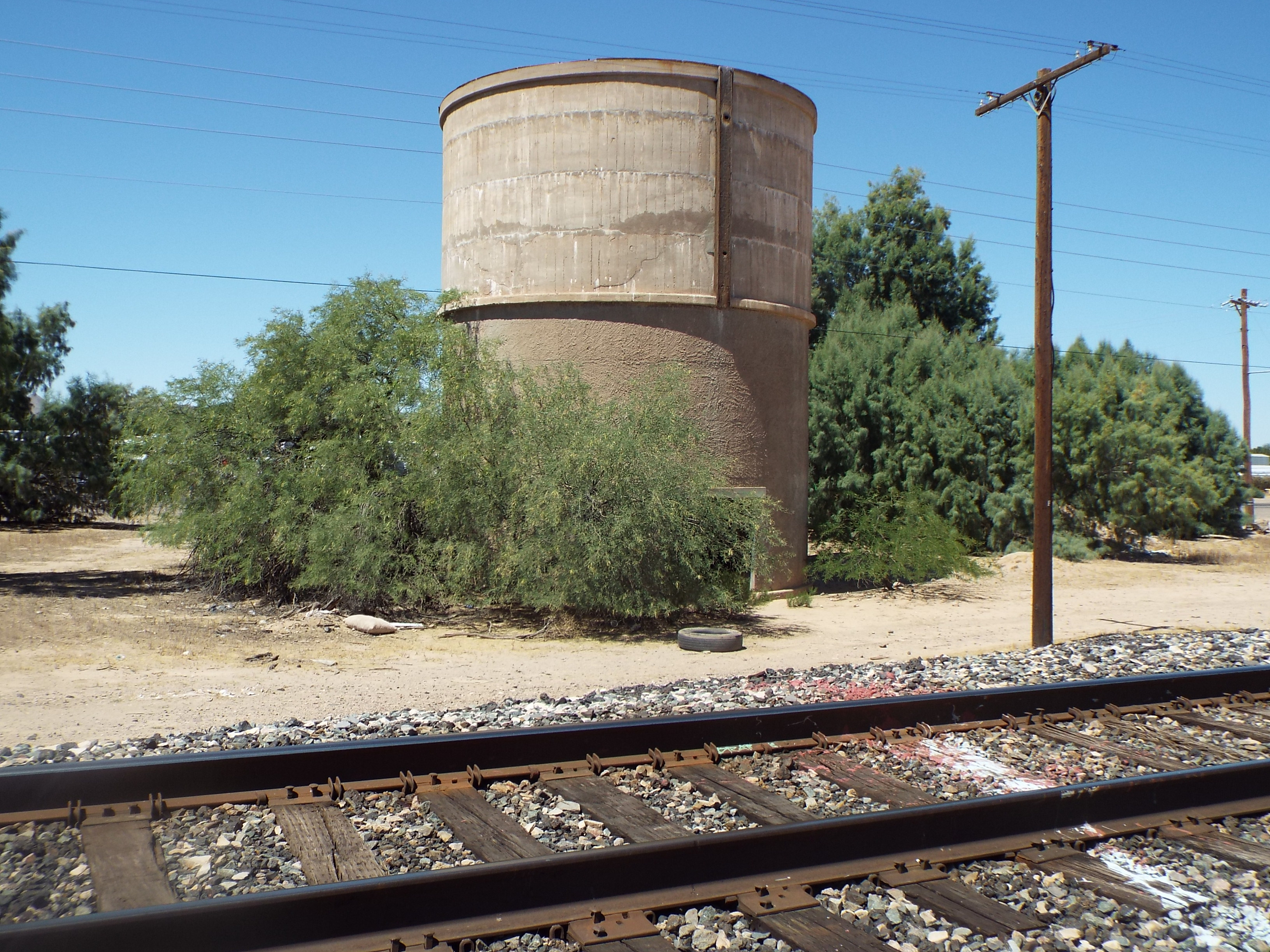
Railroad Water Tank (1900s)

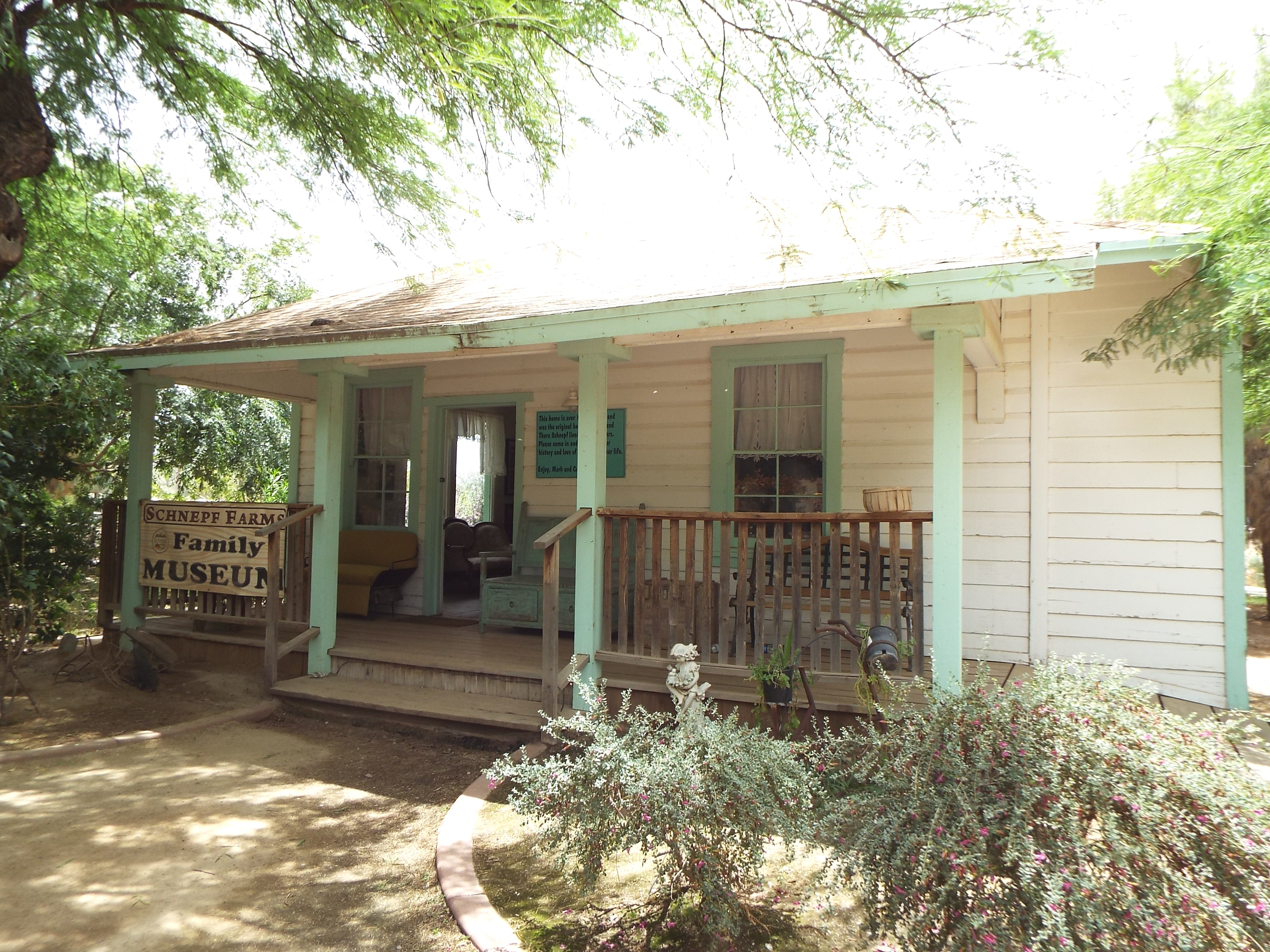
The Schnepf House (1900)

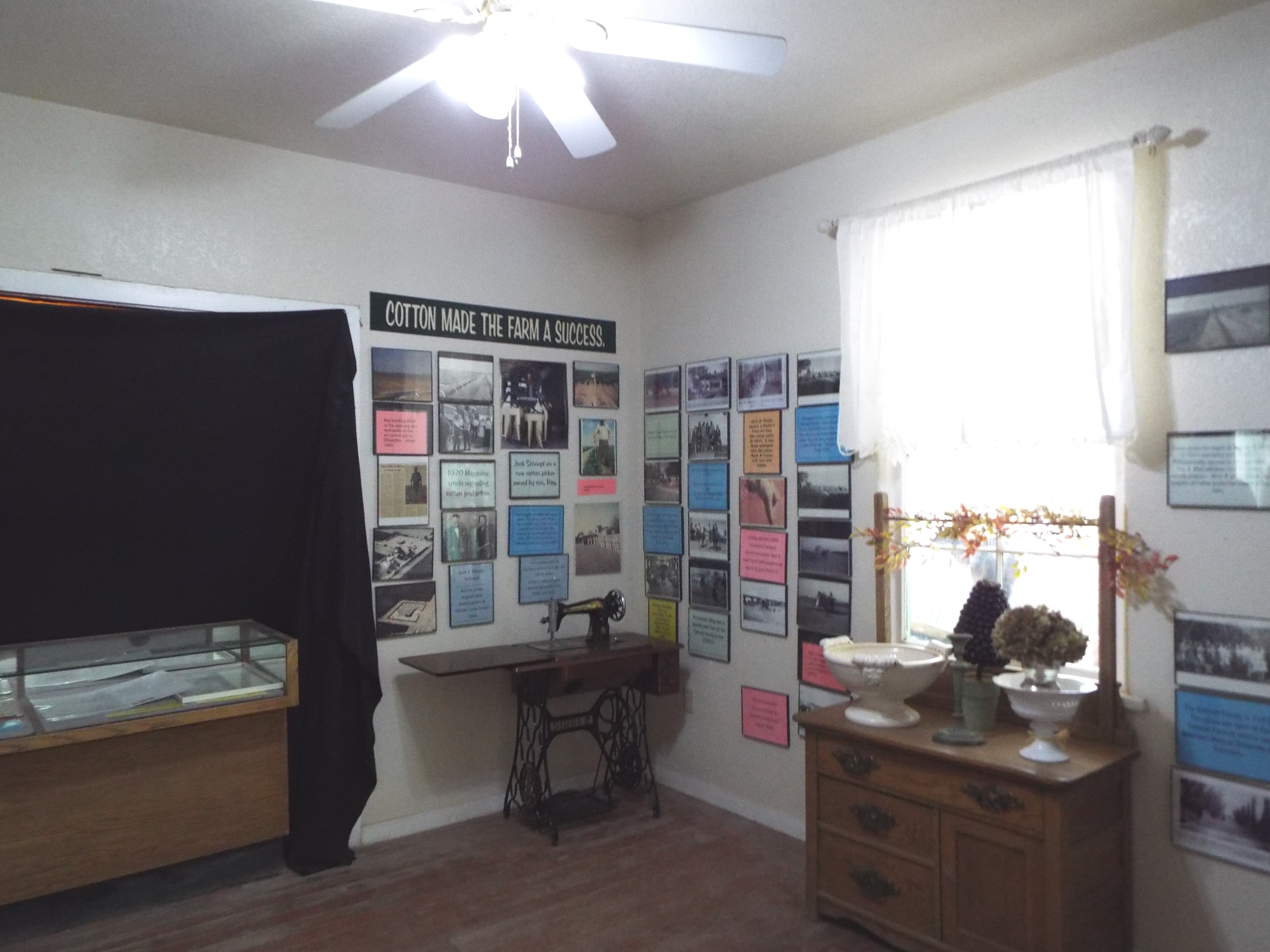
Inside the Schnepf House

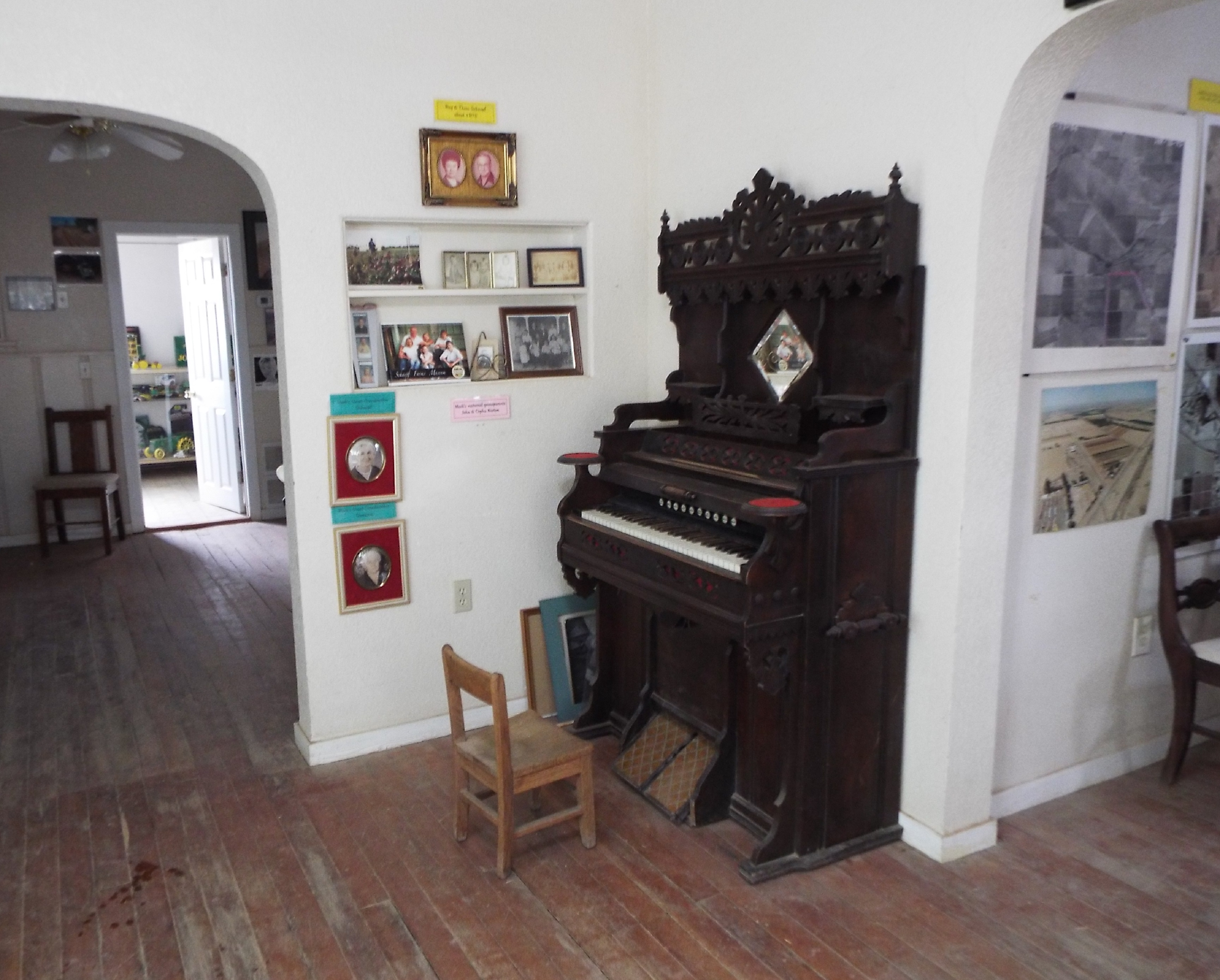
Inside the Schnepf House

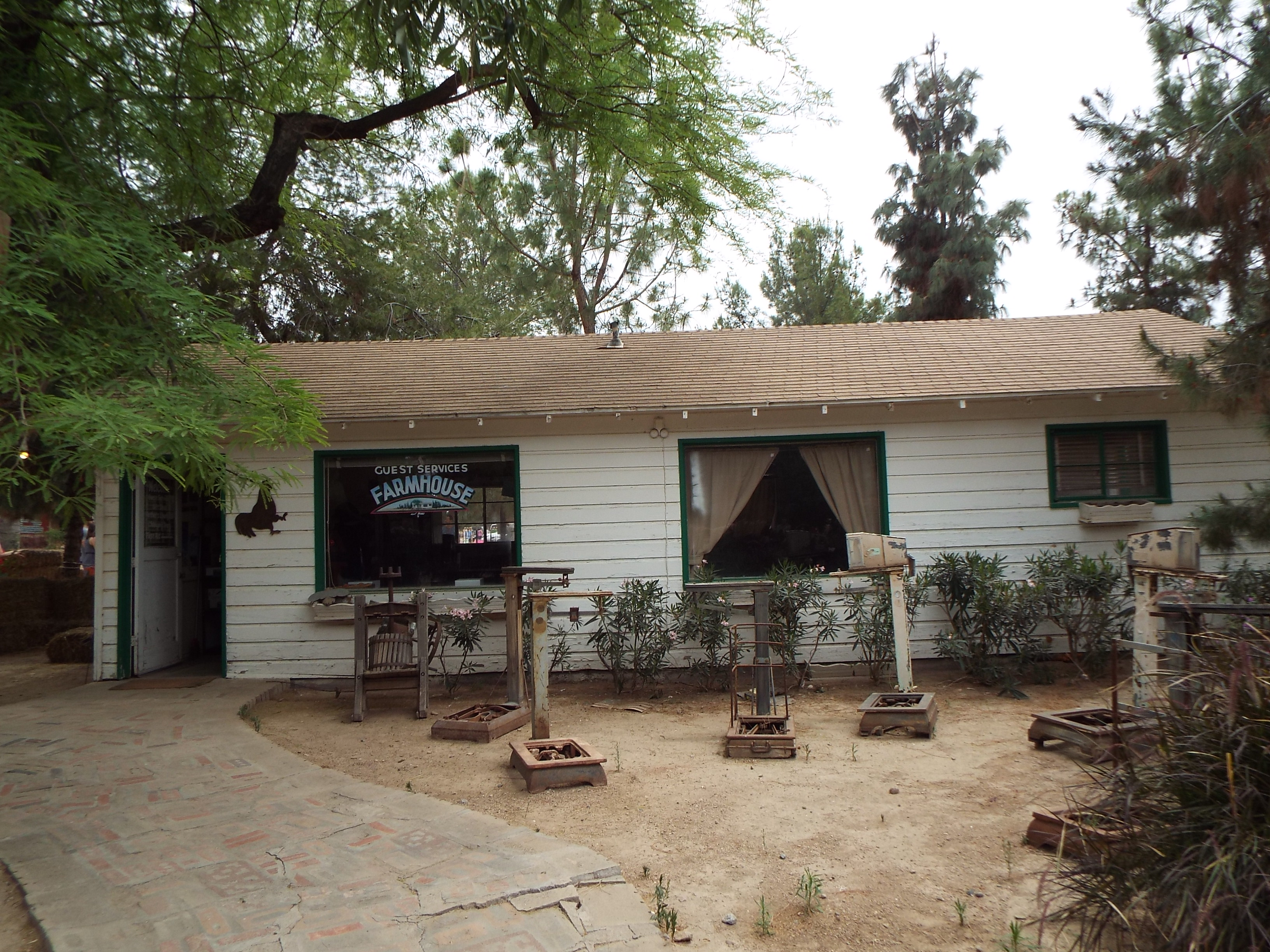
Schnepf Farms Customer Service Farmhouse (1900)

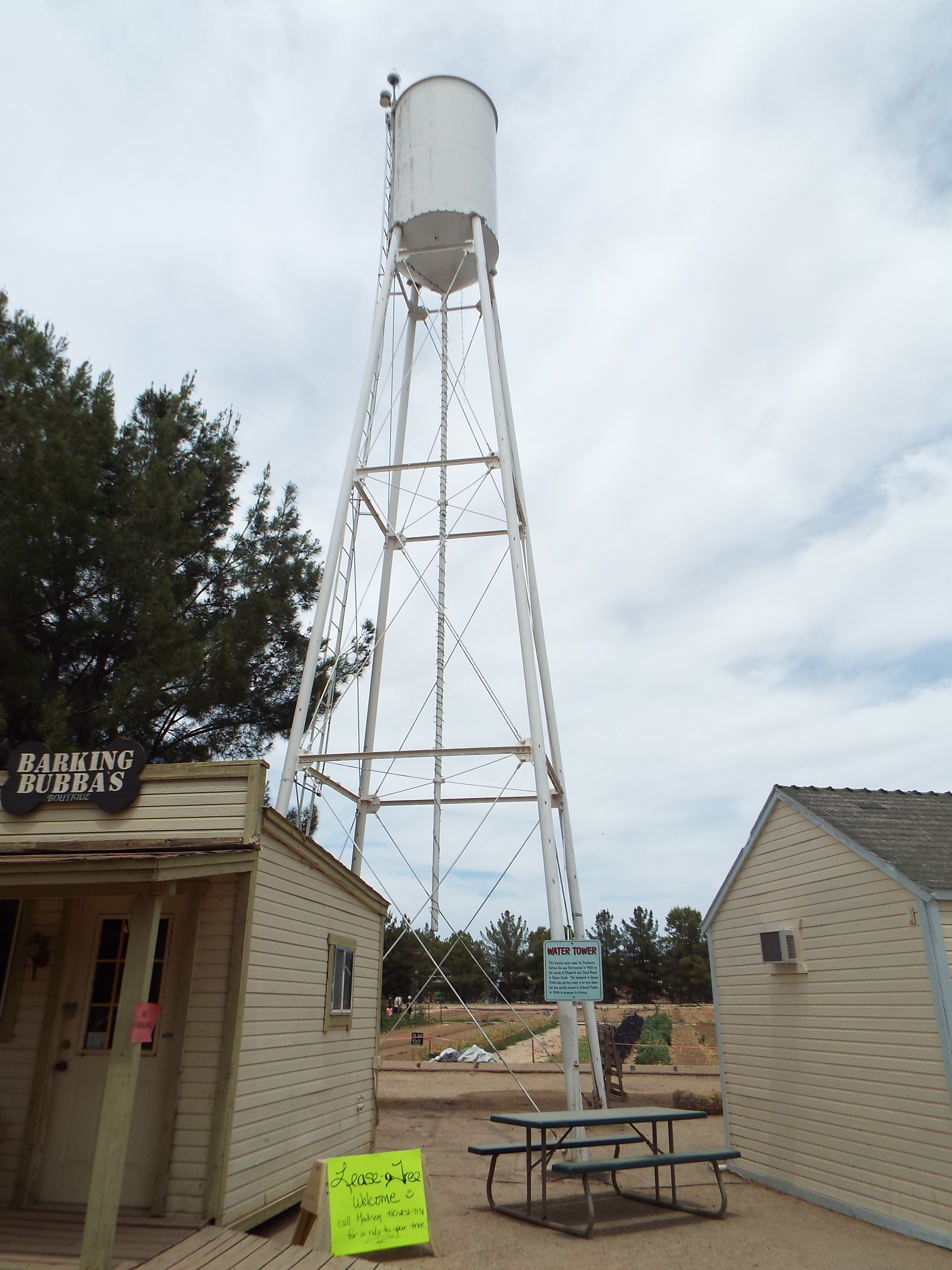
Water Tower (1952)

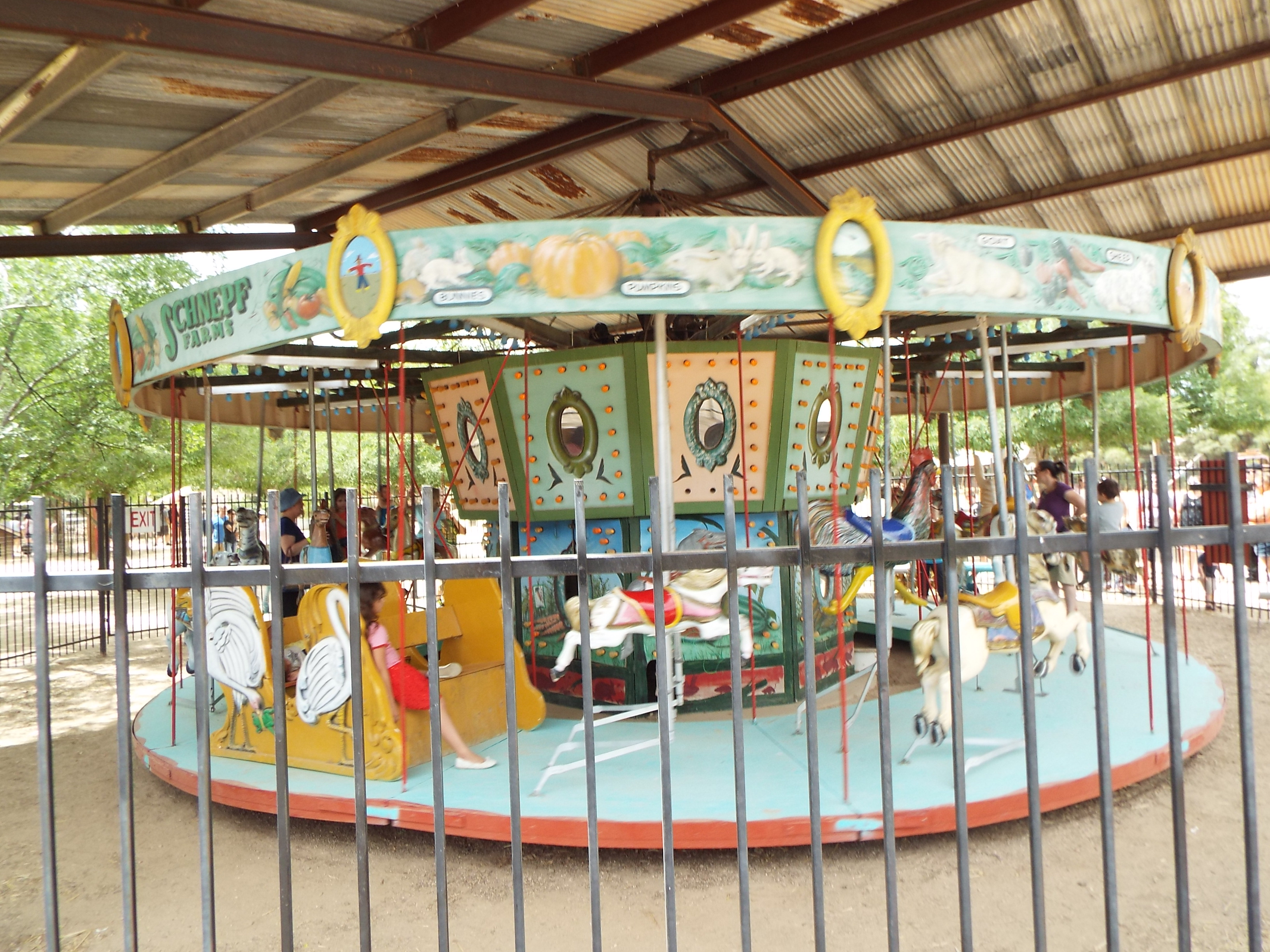
Parker Carousel (1912)

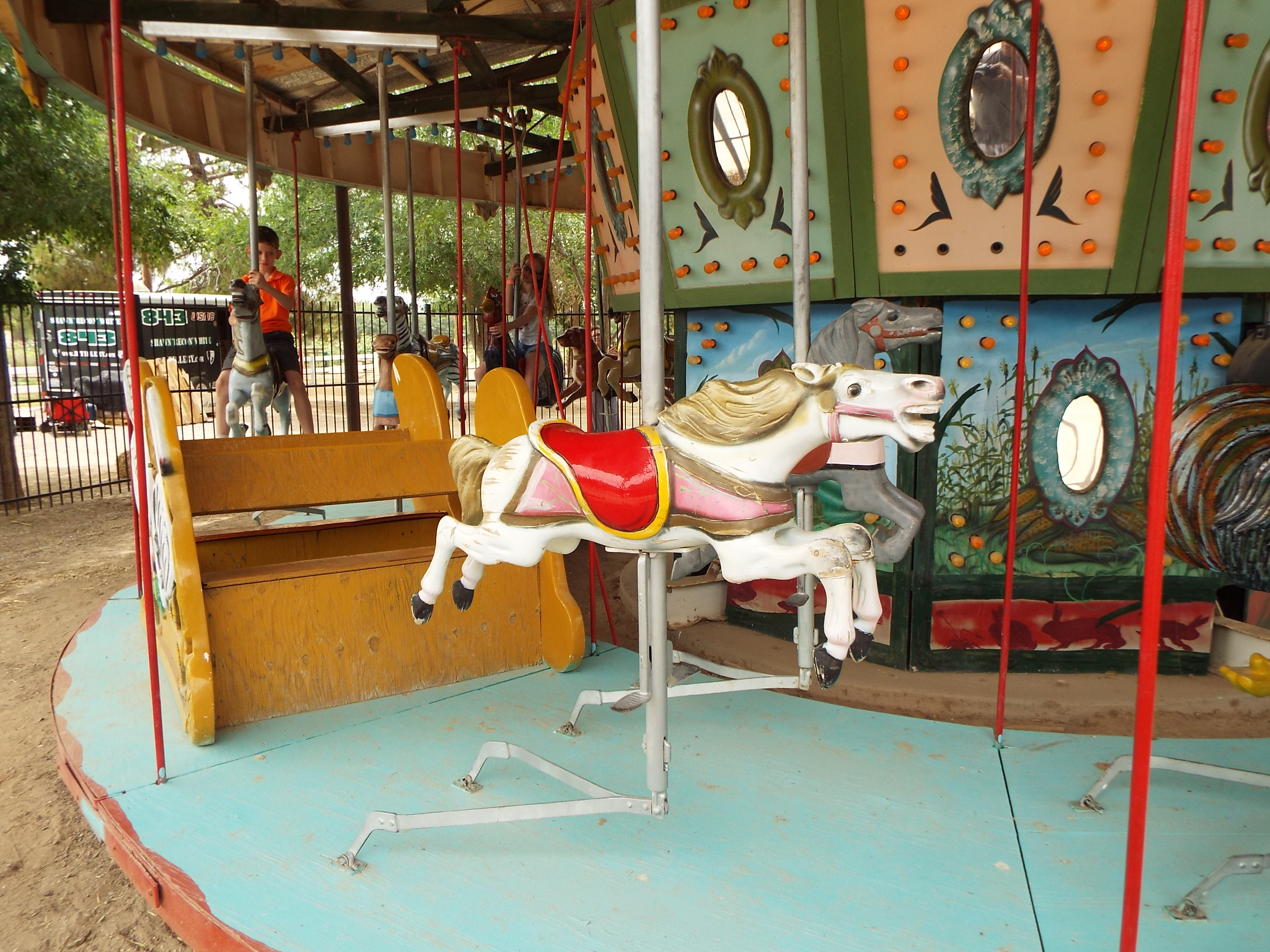
Parker Carousel original wooden horses (1912)

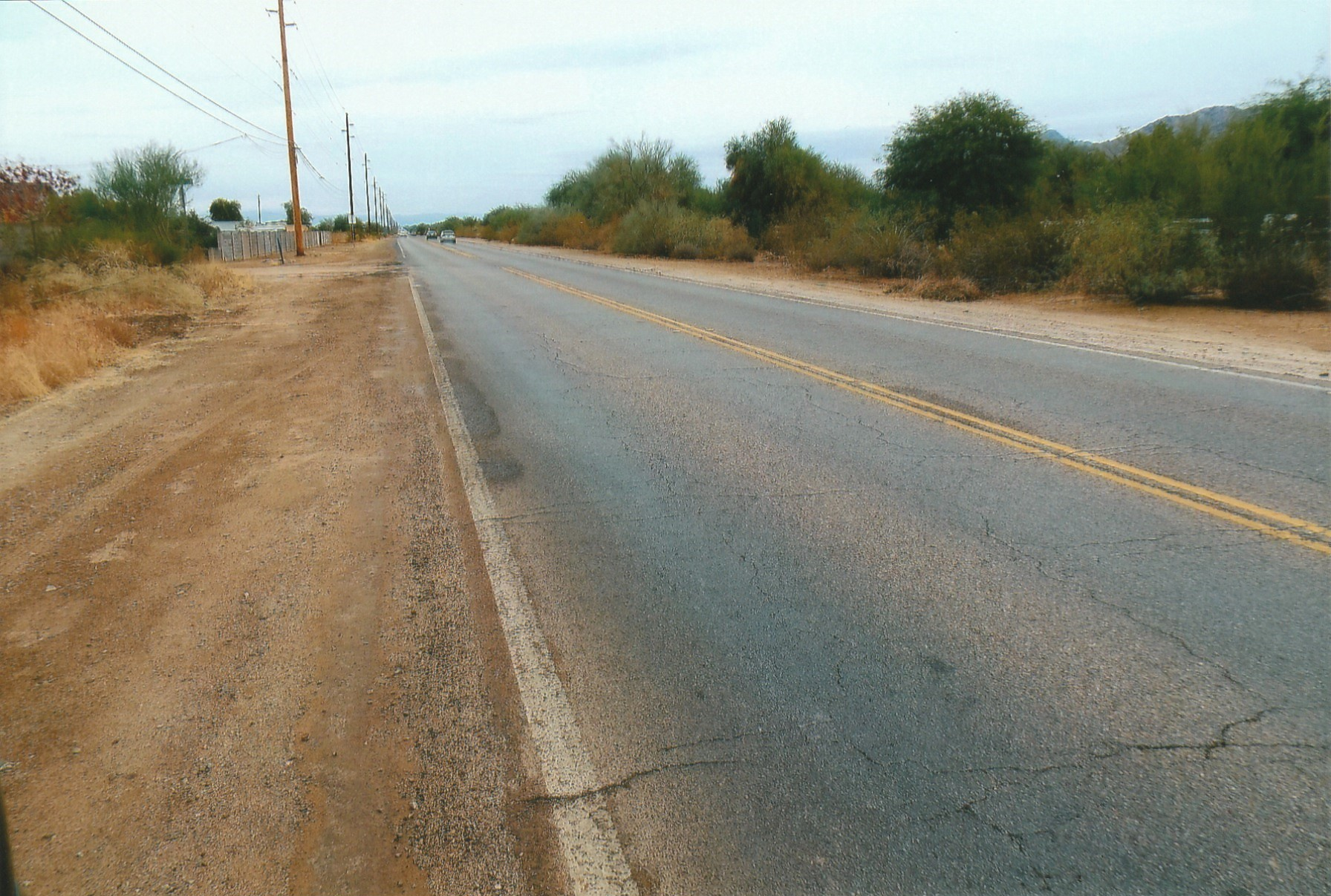
Historic Hunt Highway built in 1913

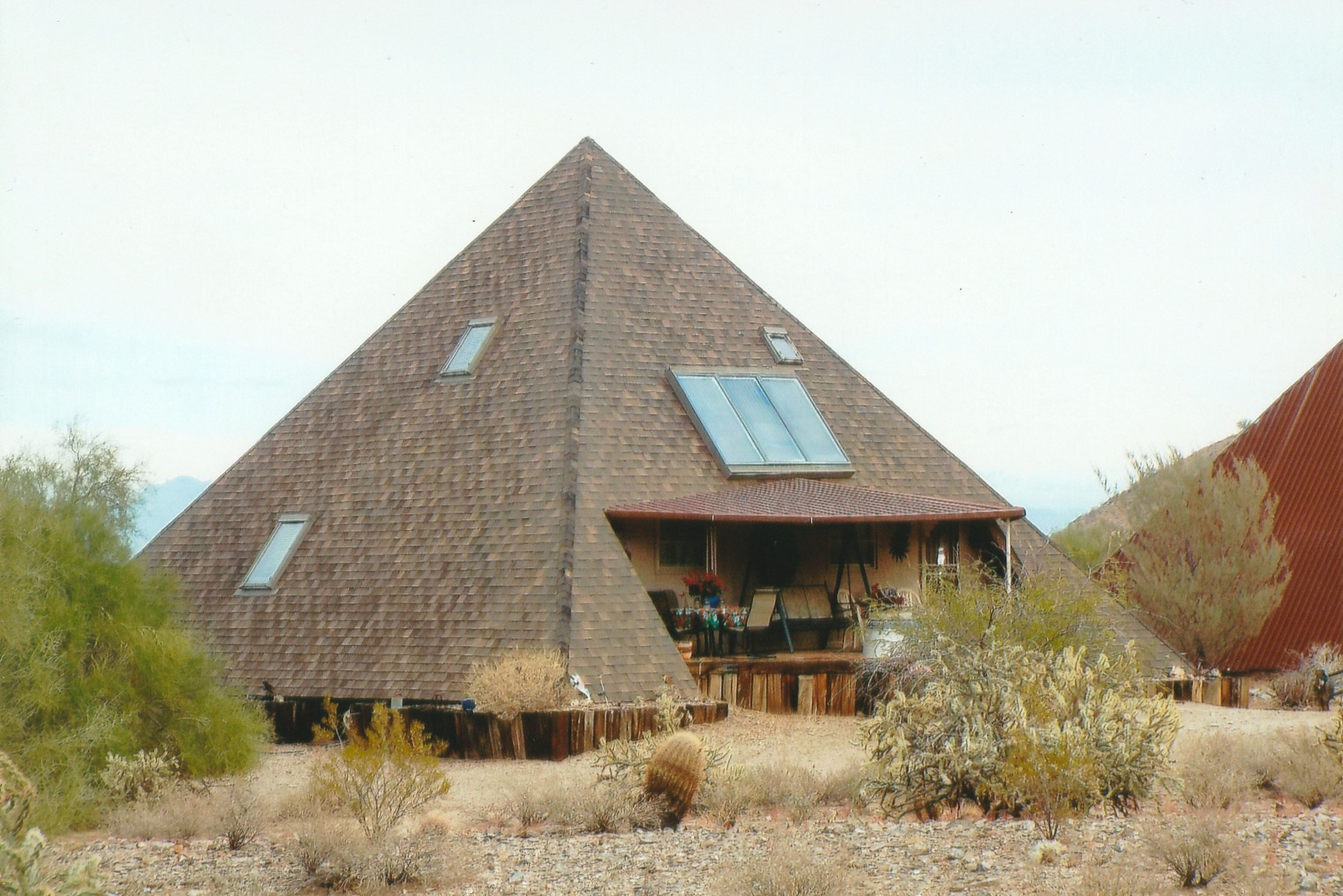
Pyramid House built in 1978 and located at 34317 Goldmine Gulch Trail
San Tan Mountain Regional Park
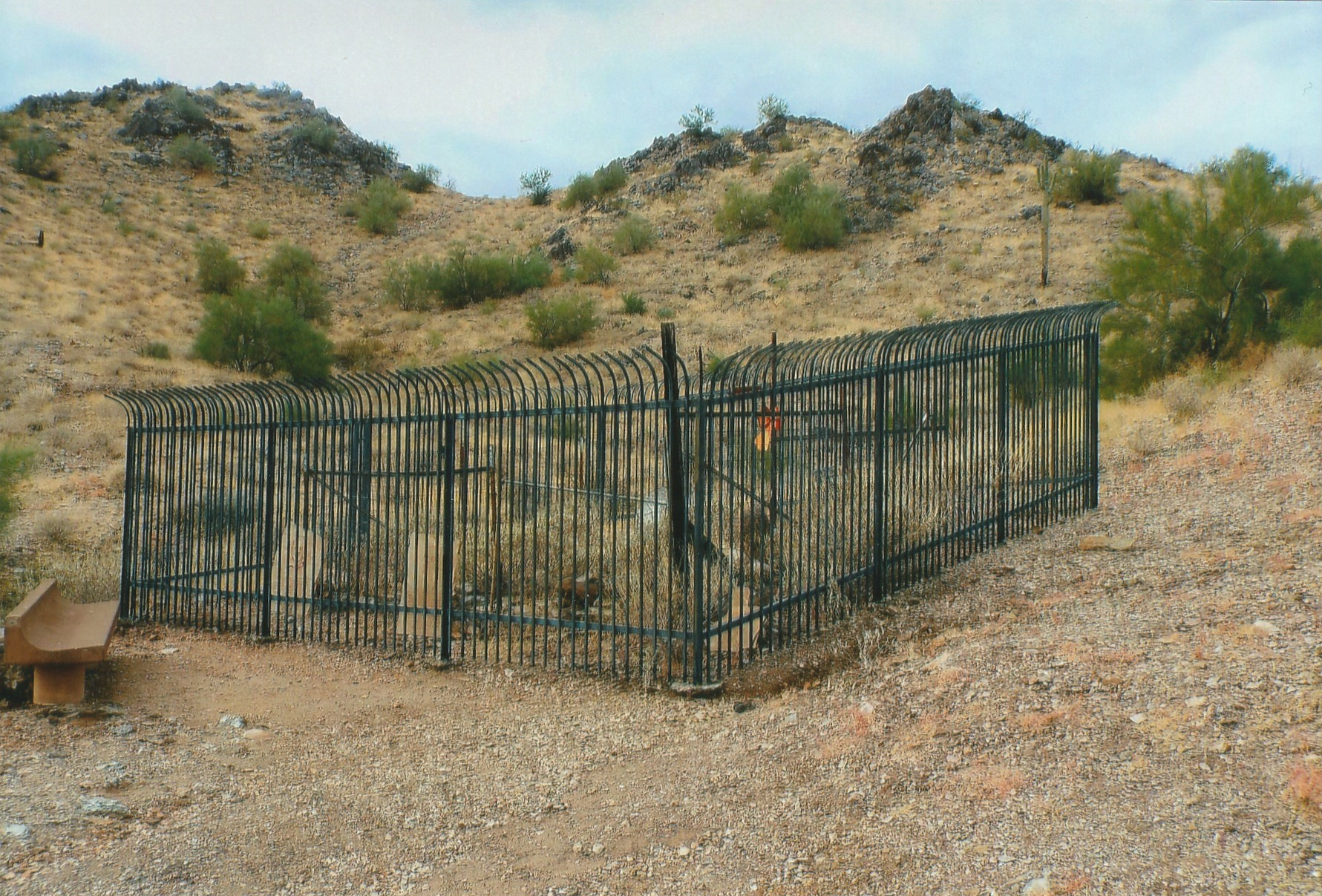
Gravesite of Mansel Carter and Marion E. Kennedy

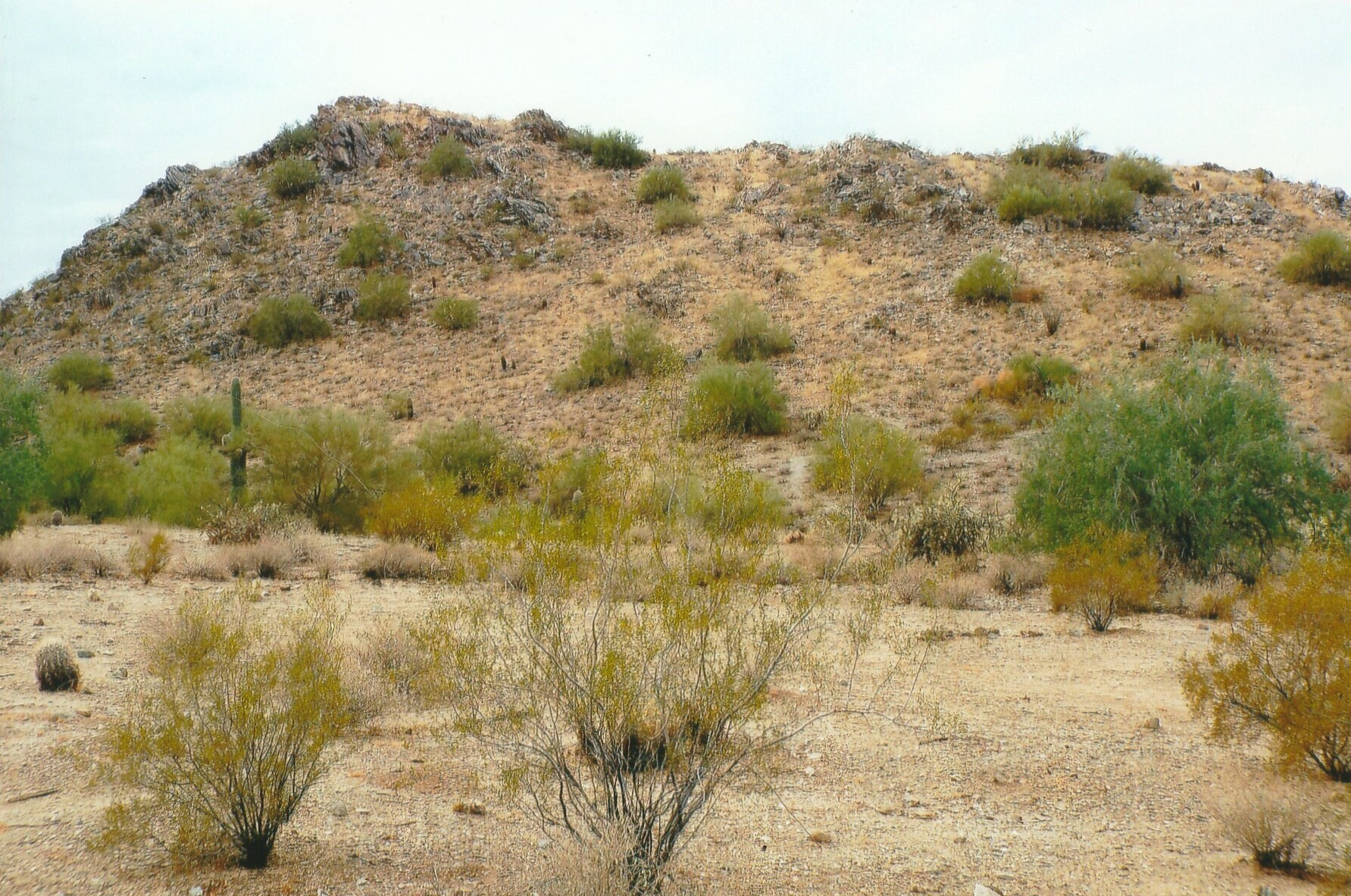
Gold Mountain

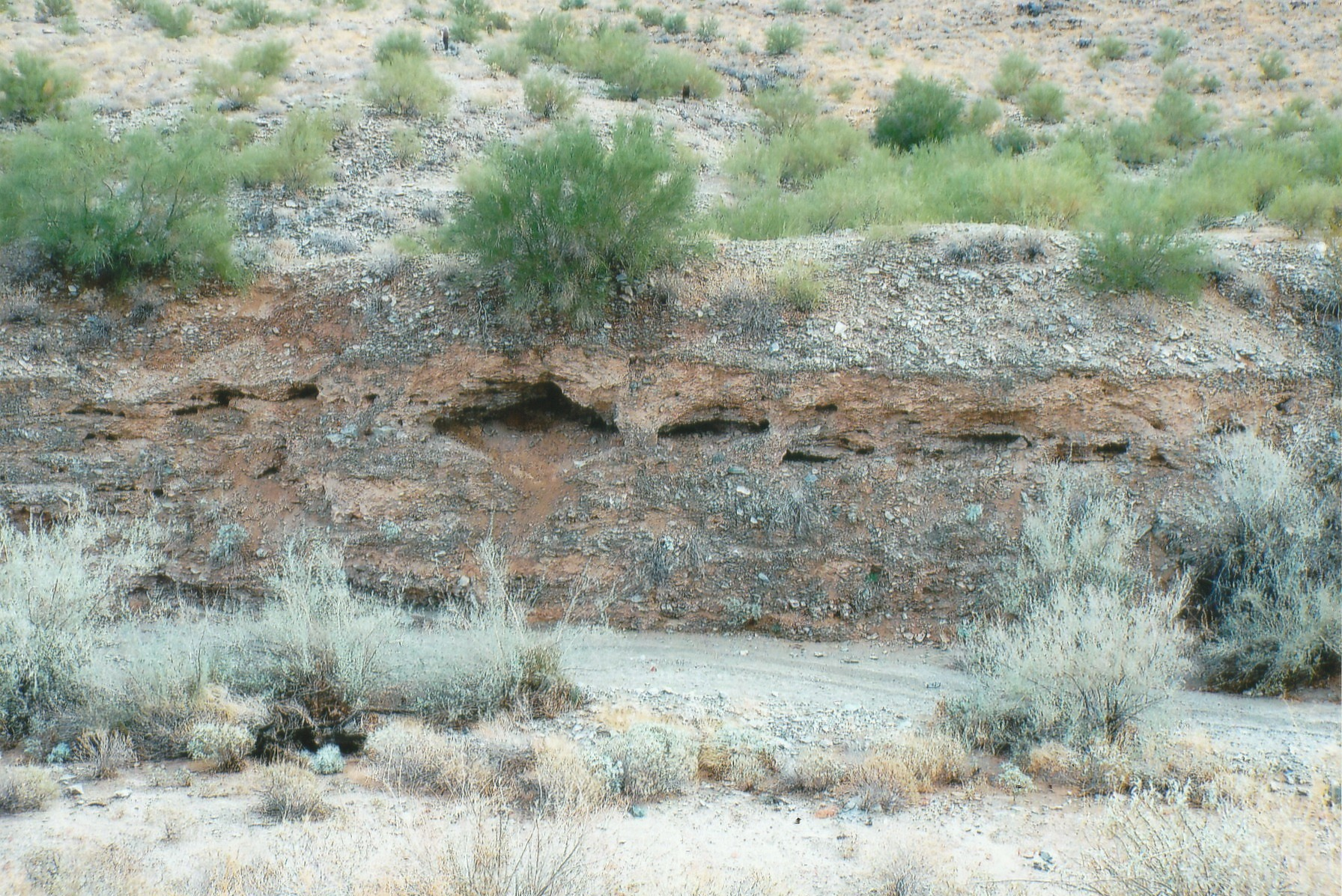
Goldmine Gulch. The gulch is a narrow and steep-sided ravine marking the course of a fast stream.

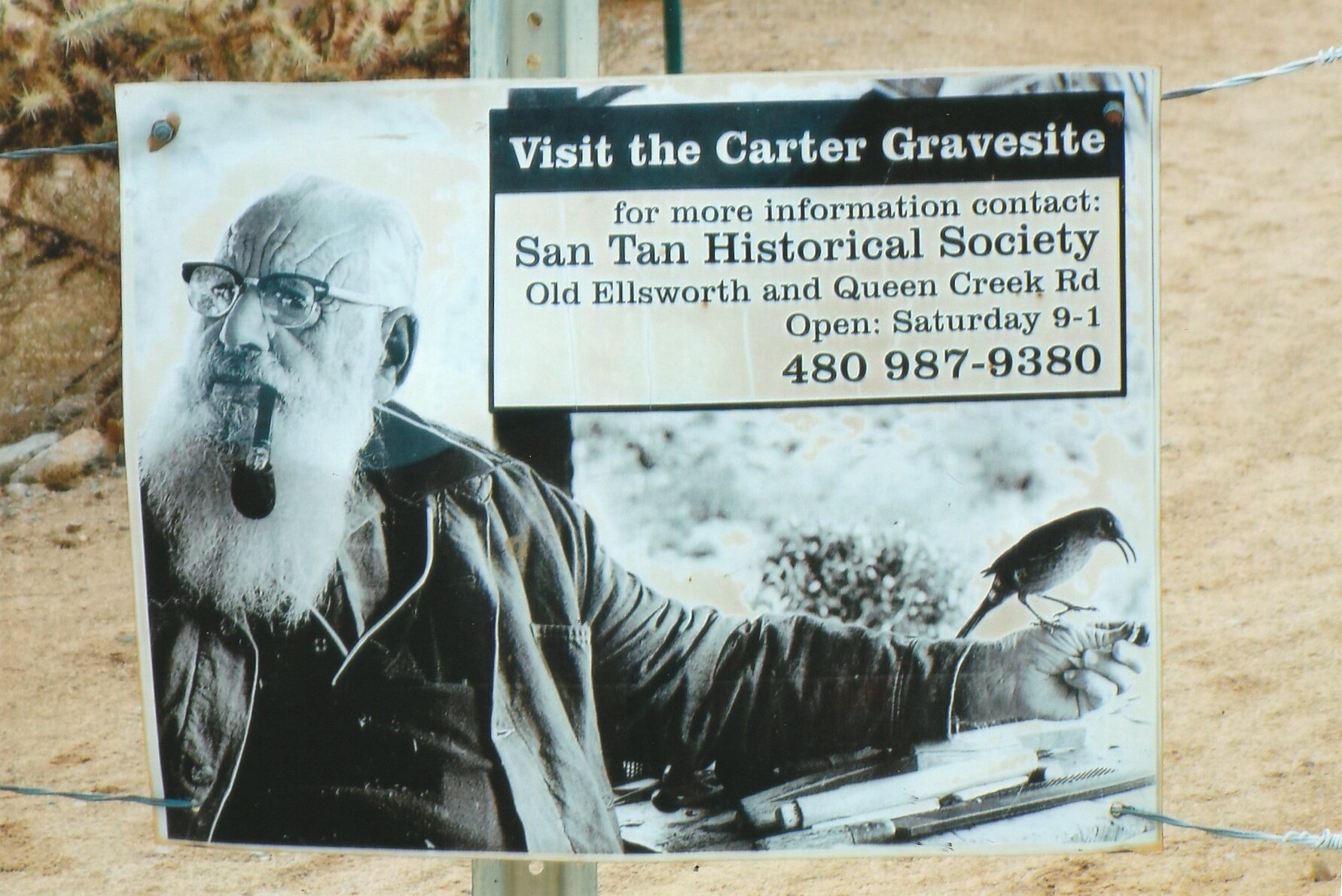
Mansel Carter’s gravesite marker in San Tan Mountain Regional Park.

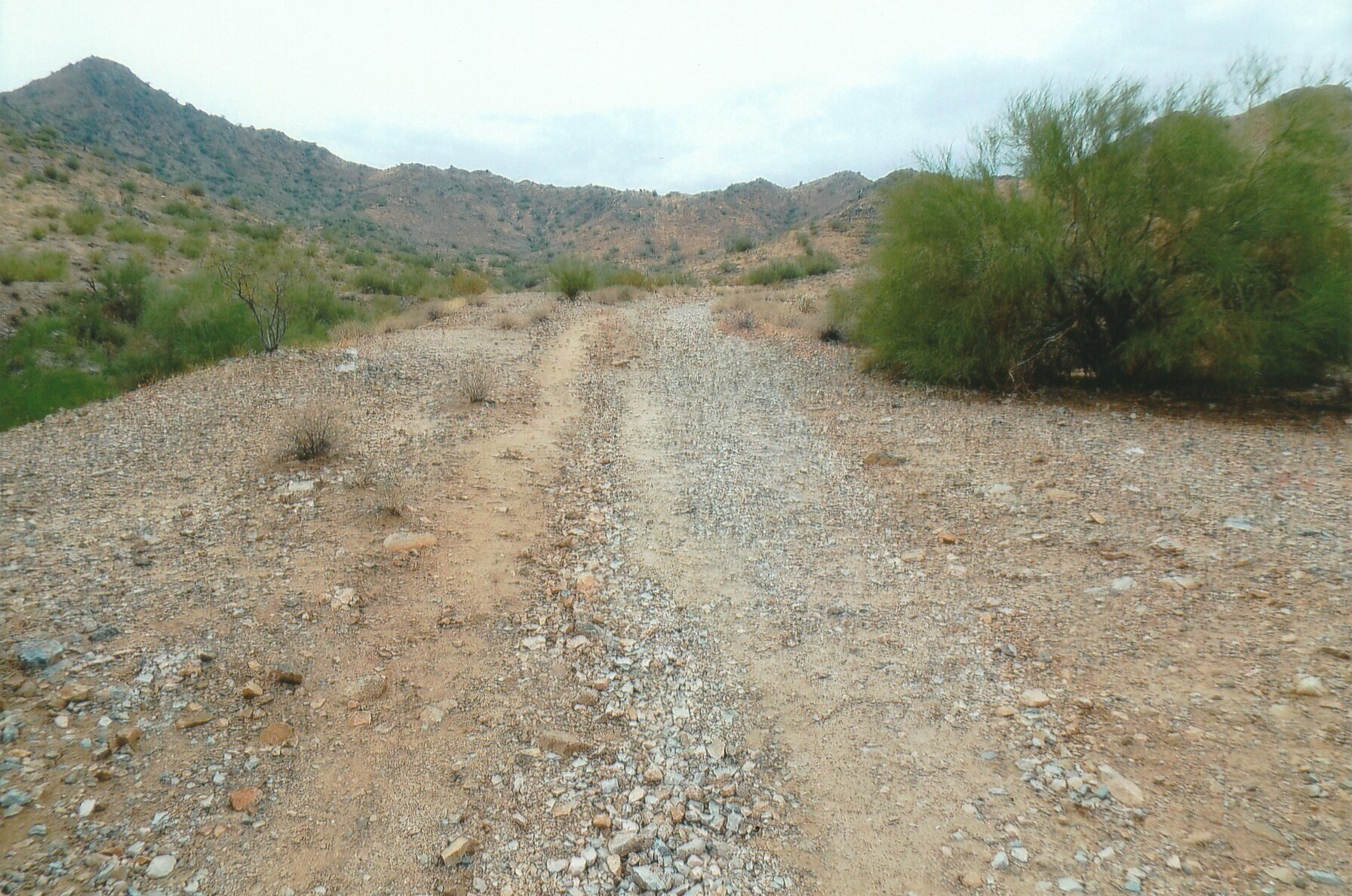
The Goldmine Trail.

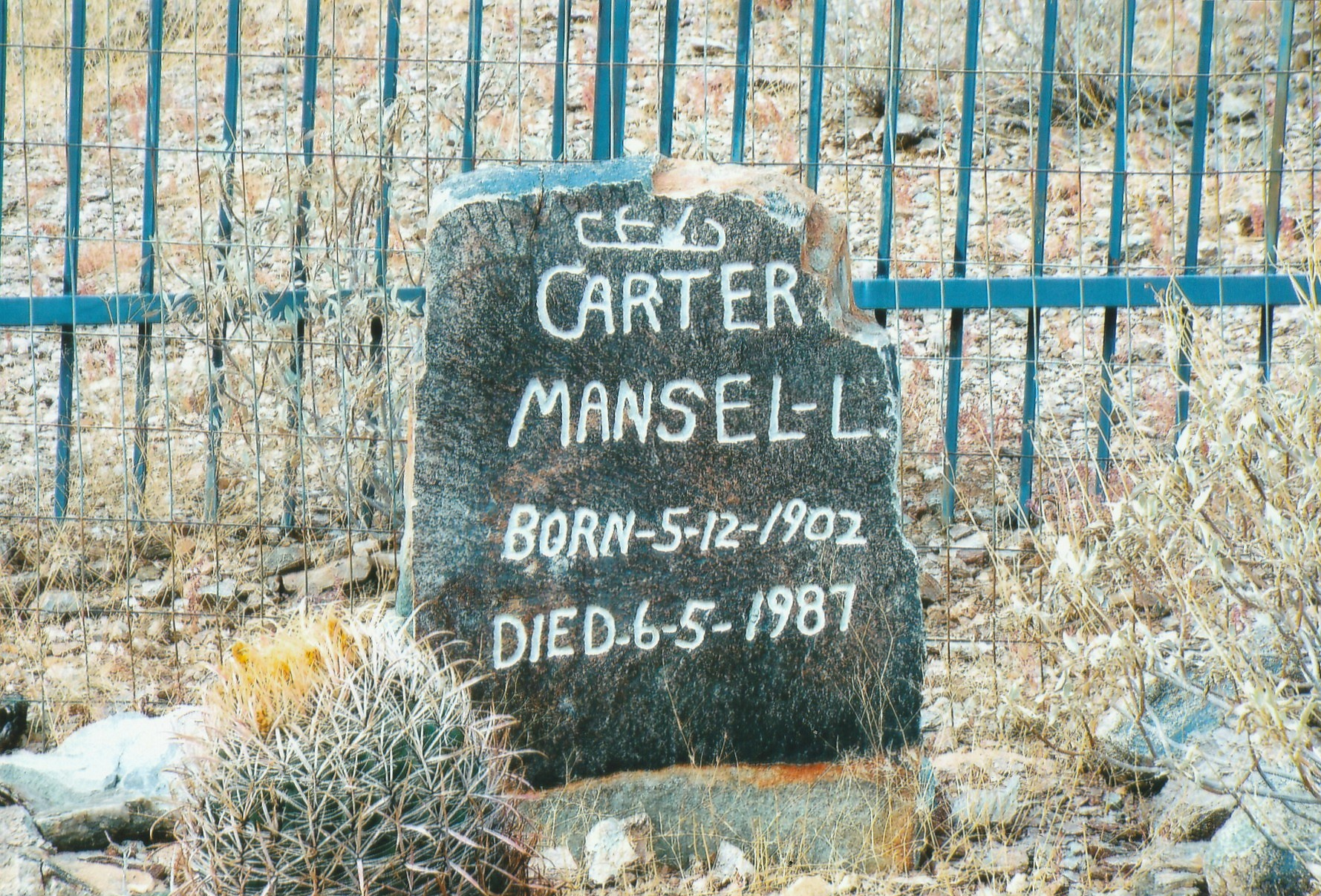
Tombstone of Mansel Carter (1902–1987).

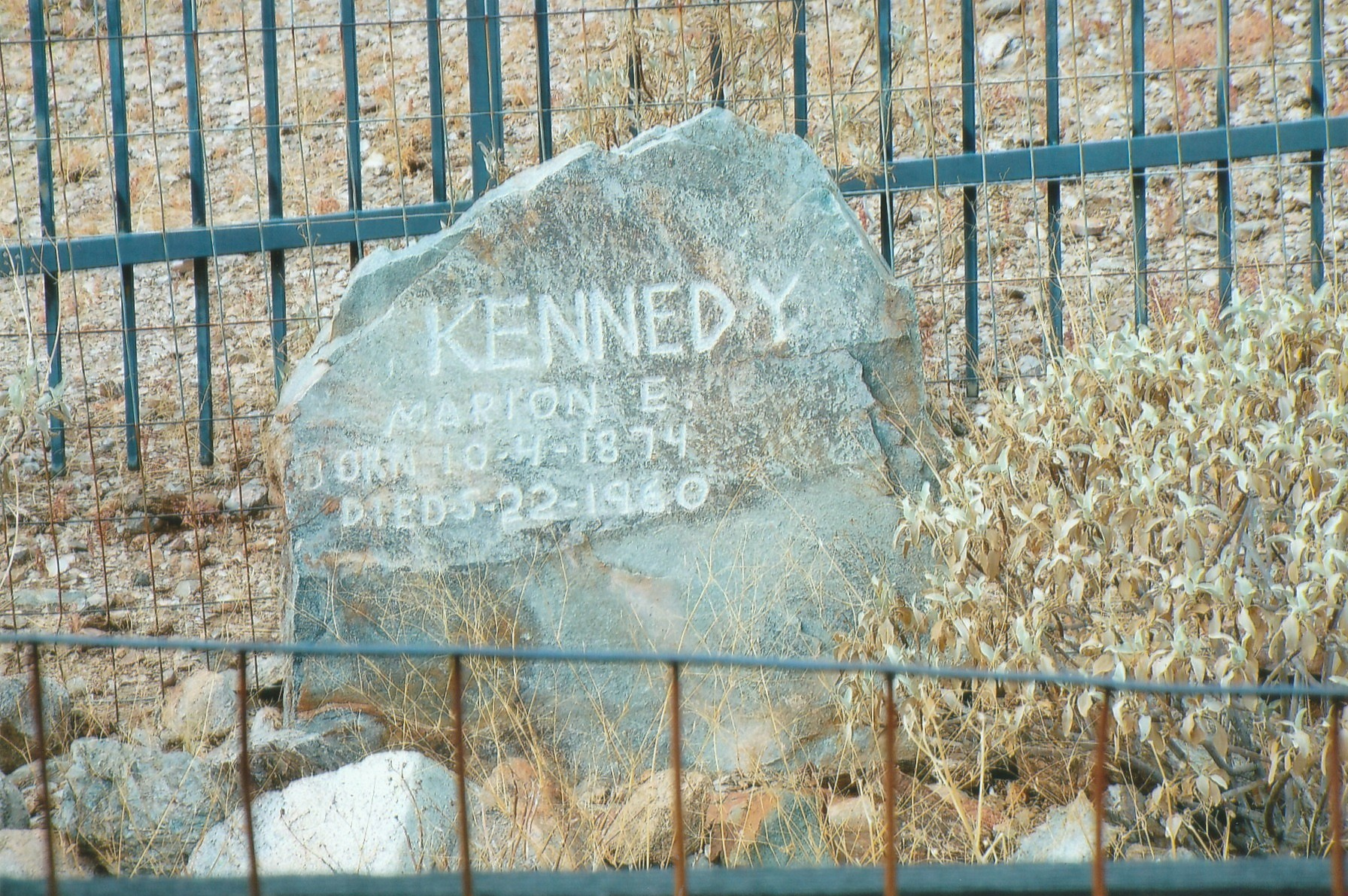
Tombstone of Marion E. Kennedy (1874–1960)

== See also ==
- National Register of Historic Places listings in Arizona
- National Register of Historic Places listings in Maricopa County, Arizona
- National Register of Historic Places listings in Pinal County, Arizona
