= Our Lady of Guadalupe Church (Queen Creek, Arizona) =

First Roman Catholic Church in Queen Creek, Arizona

Coordinates: 33°14′52″N 111°38′22″W

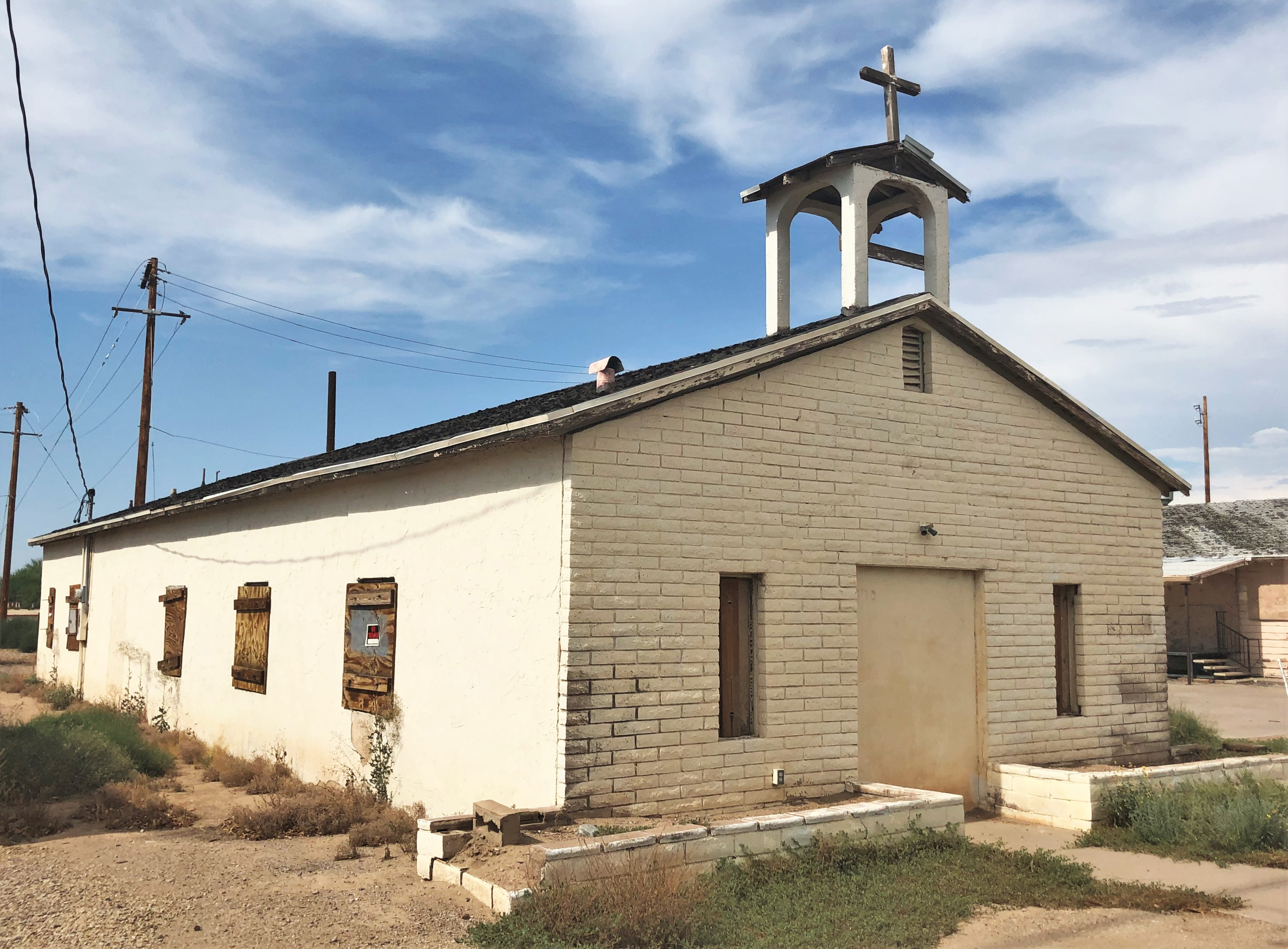
2021 Old Our Lady of Guadalupe Church from west.jpg

Our Lady of Guadalupe Catholic Church, located at 20615 East Ocotillo Road near the intersection of South Ellsworth Loop Road in Queen Creek, Arizona, was the first Roman Catholic Church in the town. It was completed in the late 1980s. The parish's original church sits at 20536 Octotillo, across from the current grounds.

The parish was first organized in the late 1940s to serve Mexican-Americans who began moving to the area in the late 1920s and early 1930s. At first, they met in old barracks buildings courtesy of the school district, which had bought them from Williams Air Force Base for classrooms, a cafeteria, and an auditorium. The visiting priest would hold mass and hear confessions in the auditorium, and nuns used the classrooms in the summer for catechism classes.

Wanting their own building, the congregation started a building fund in 1960, raising money by selling homemade goods. The people of the congregation built the new church, and another wooden barracks was obtained from the base and moved next to it. In 1975, the church building was deemed to be unsafe, and the insurance company refused to renew its policy. Another fund-raising effort led to property being purchased across the street in 1988 for a new church.

== Gallery ==
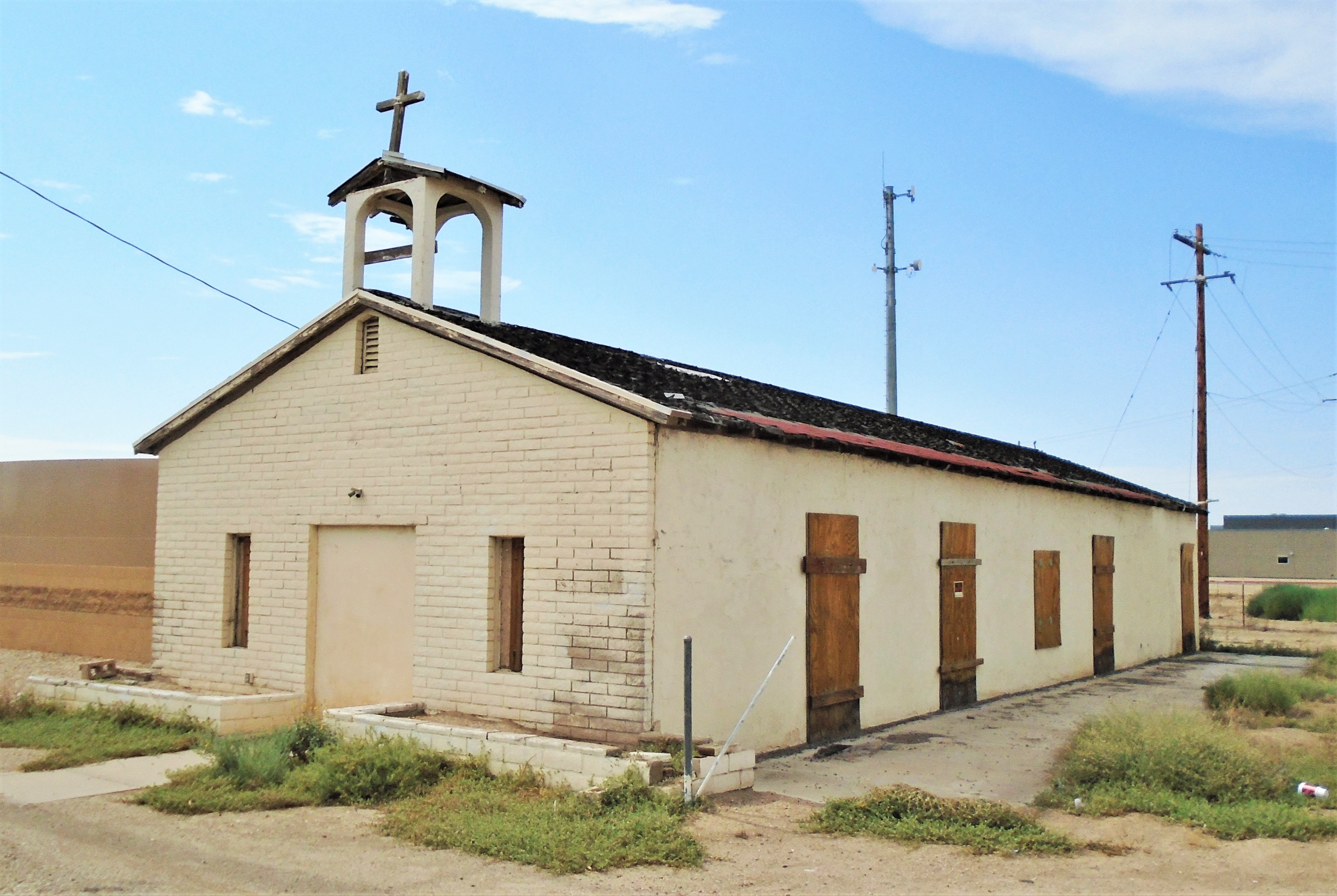
The original church; the two stained glass windows in the front were removed for safe-keeping.

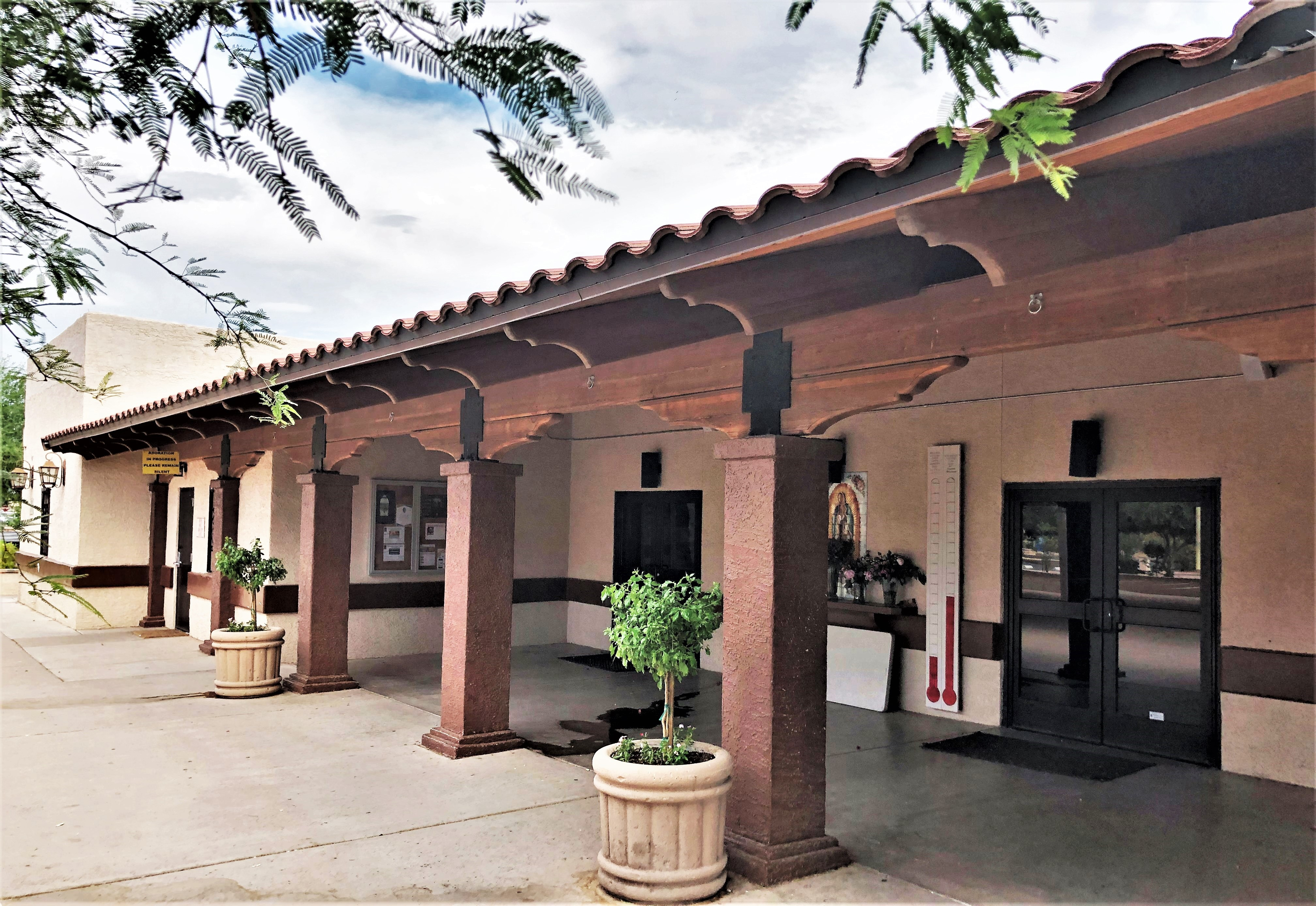
The southern face of the current church.

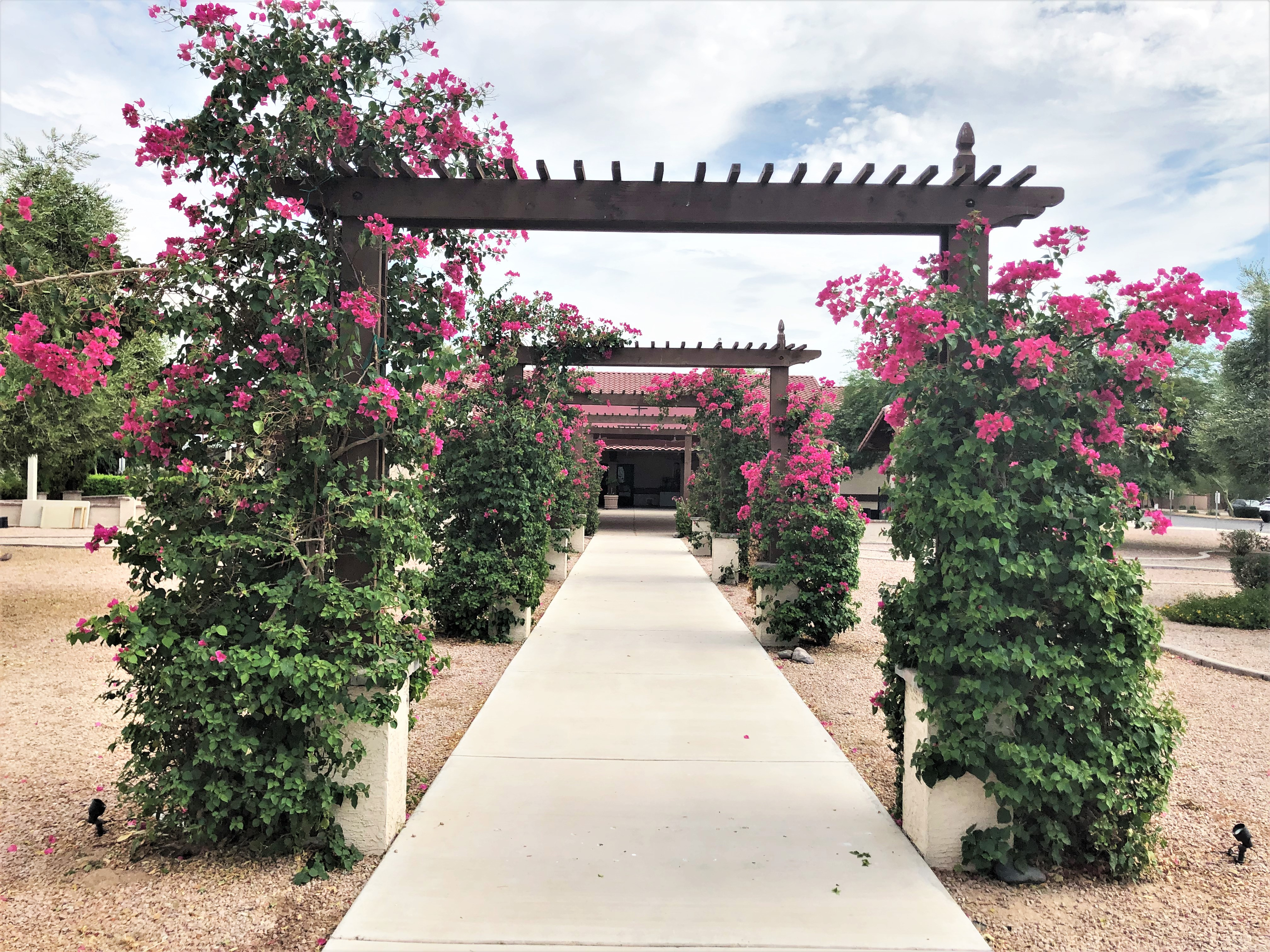
Part of the church's "Garden of Peace".
