= Ohio State Route 660 =

State highway in Guernsey County, Ohio, US

State Route 660

Route information
- Maintained by ODOT
- Length: 6.33 mi (10.19 km)
- Existed: 1937–present

Major junctions
- West end: SR 313 near Claysville
- East end: SR 209 near Cambridge

Location
- Country: United States
- State: Ohio
- Counties: Guernsey

Highway system
- Ohio State Highway System; Interstate; US; State; Scenic
← SR 658	→ SR 661

State Route 660 (SR 660) is an east–west state highway in the east-central portion of Ohio. Existing entirely within Guernsey County, the western terminus of State Route 660 is at State Route 313 just east of the hamlet of Claysville. Its eastern terminus is at a signalized T-intersection with State Route 209 near Cambridge Municipal Airport, 1.25 miles (2.01 km) south of the city limits of Cambridge, as well as State Route 209's interchange off of Interstate 70.

== History ==
State Route 660 was established in 1937 along the routing that it currently occupies. No significant changes have taken place to the highway since its inception, other than the fact that the route that State Route 660 met at its northern terminus was originally U.S. Route 21, which has since been re-designated as an extension of State Route 209.

== Major intersections ==
The entire route is in Guernsey County.

Location	mi	km	Destinations	Notes
Westland Township	0.00	0.00	SR 313 / Hendershot Road	
Jackson Township	6.33	10.19	SR 209 – Cambridge, Byesville	
1.000 mi = 1.609 km; 1.000 km = 0.621 mi
