= Ohio State Route 658 =

State highway in Guernsey County, Ohio, US

State Route 658

Route information
- Maintained by ODOT
- Length: 11.07 mi (17.82 km)
- Existed: 1937–present

Major junctions
- South end: SR 209 in Adams Township
- North end: SR 541 in Wheeling Township

Location
- Country: United States
- State: Ohio
- Counties: Guernsey

Highway system
- Ohio State Highway System; Interstate; US; State; Scenic
← SR 657	→ SR 660

State Route 658 (SR 658) is a 11-mile-long (18 km) state highway in Guernsey County, Ohio. Located in the northwest quadrant of the county, it connects SR 209 in Adams Township (northwest of Cambridge) with SR 541 in Wheeling Township.

== Route description ==
The two-lane road starts at a T-intersection with SR 209 in the northeastern corner of Adams Township. Through most of the route, the road passes through the Allegheny Plateau of the Appalachian Mountains; the elevations generally range between 800 and 1,000 feet (240 and 300 m) as it passes between small valleys formed by streams and the tops of hills. North from SR 209, SR 658 passes through forested areas ascending from the southern terminus to the top of a hill. After descending to cross Sarchet Run, the road ascends through two sharp curves to head into more open land on a ridge as it crosses into Knox Township. In Knox Township, SR 658 passes through the unincorporated settlement of Indian Camp and crosses Indian Camp Run and Dry Run. Near the Indian Camp Run Covered Bridge, SR 658 ascends another hill where it passes through a narrow strip of open land and the settlement of Flat Ridge. Beginning to near its northern terminus, the road crosses into Wheeling Township and descends to a flood plain of Wills Creek. In the community of Birds Run, the road passes open land, some homes, and a Baptist church. After crossing Wills Creek, SR 658 ends at an intersection with SR 541.

== History ==
SR 658 was designated on a road connecting SR 209 and what was then numbered SR 271 (now SR 541) in 1937. Except for its transition from a gravel-paved road to a fully asphalt-paved road by 1958, the road has not experienced any major changes since its designation.

== Major intersections ==
The entire route is in Guernsey County.

Location	mi	km	Destinations	Notes
Adams Township	0.00	0.00	SR 209 (Bloomfield Road)	
Wheeling Township	11.07	17.82	SR 541	
1.000 mi = 1.609 km; 1.000 km = 0.621 mi
