= Ohio State Route 209 =

State highway in eastern Ohio, US

State Route 209

Route information
- Maintained by ODOT
- Length: 16.63 mi (26.76 km)
- Existed: 1923–present

Major junctions
- West end: SR 83 near New Concord
- US 22 / US 40 in Cambridge; I-70 in Cambridge
- East end: I-77 / SR 821 in Byesville

Location
- Country: United States
- State: Ohio
- Counties: Muskingum, Guernsey

Highway system
- Ohio State Highway System; Interstate; US; State; Scenic
← SR 208	→ SR 210

State Route 209 (SR 209, OH 209) is an east–west state highway in eastern Ohio, a U.S. state. The western terminus of State Route 209 is at a T-intersection with State Route 83 approximately 3.75 miles (6.04 km) north of New Concord. State Route 209's eastern terminus is concurrent with the northern terminus of State Route 821 at Interstate 77 at its exit 41 in Byesville, just 2.25 miles (3.62 km) southeast of the Interstate's interchange with Interstate 70.

== Route description ==
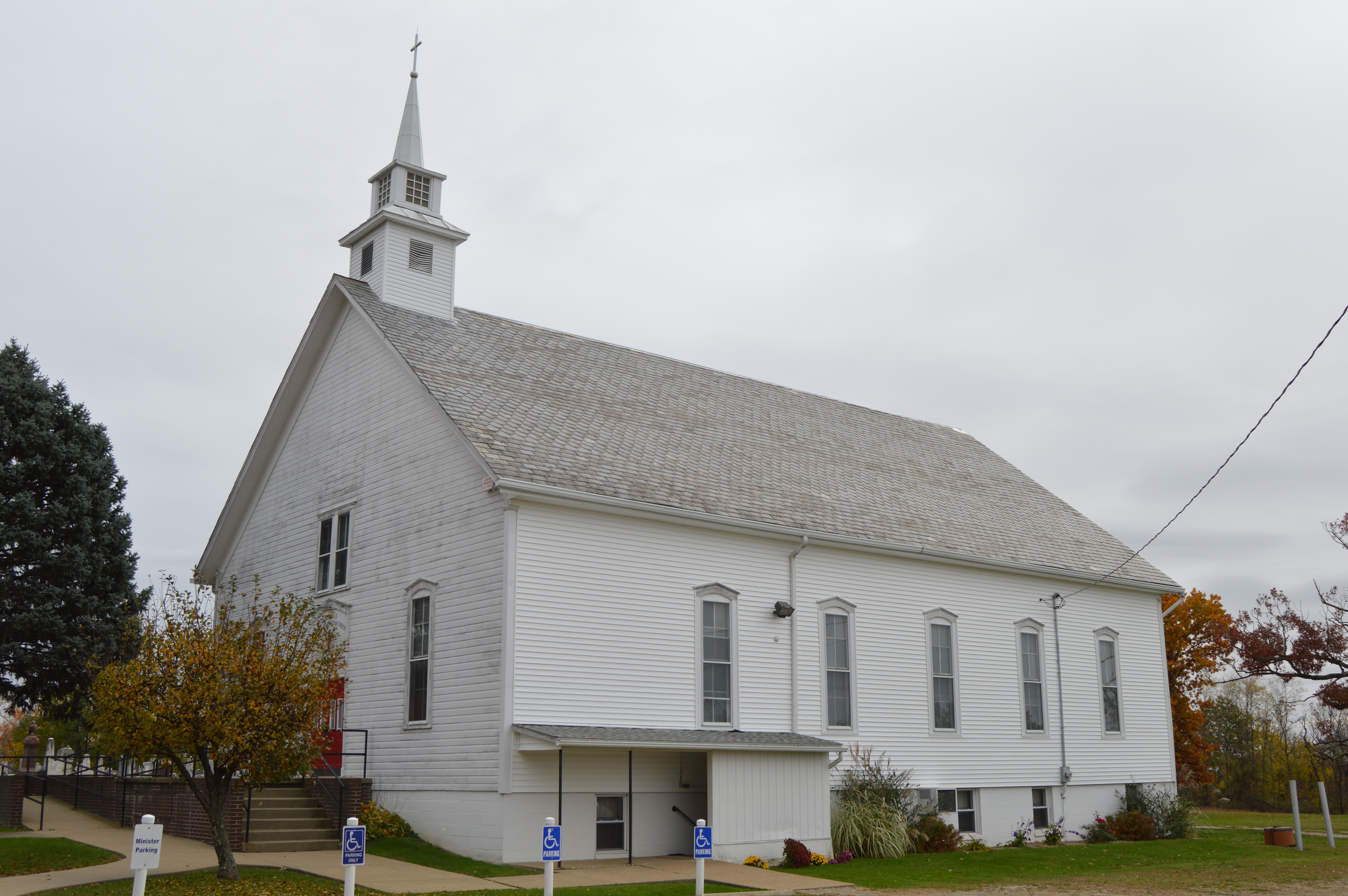
Presbyterian church at Bloomfield

State Route 209 traverses a small portion of northeastern Muskingum County and a good part of the western half of Guernsey County. No segment of this highway is included within the National Highway System, a network of routes deemed to be most important for the nation's economy, mobility and defense.

== History ==
When it was first designated in 1923, State Route 209 ran along its present alignment from its current western terminus at what was then designated State Route 76 (now State Route 83) north of New Concord to downtown Cambridge. By 1959, with the transferring of U.S. Route 21 onto a new alignment from Byesville north that passes to the east of Cambridge along what is now the alignment of Interstate 77, State Route 209 was extended southeasterly from Cambridge to its present eastern terminus in Byesville along the former alignment of U.S. Route 21.

== Major intersections ==
County	Location	mi	km	Destinations	Notes
Muskingum	Highland Township	0.00	0.00	SR 83 – New Concord, Coshocton	
Guernsey	Adams Township	3.86	6.21	SR 662 north	Southern terminus of SR 662
Guernsey	Adams Township	7.19	11.57	SR 658 north – Birds Run	Southern terminus of SR 658
Guernsey	Cambridge	9.84	15.84	US 22 west / US 40 west (Dewey Avenue) / Wheeling Avenue	Western end of US 22/US 40 concurrency
Guernsey	Cambridge	10.12	16.29	US 22 east / US 40 east (Wheeling Avenue)	Eastern end of US 22/US 40 concurrency
Guernsey	Cambridge Township	12.18	19.60	I-70 – Columbus, Wheeling	Exit 178 (I-70)
Guernsey	Jackson Township	13.40	21.57	SR 660 west – Claysville	Eastern terminus of SR 660
Guernsey	Byesville	15.91	25.60	SR 821 south (Second Street)	Western end of SR 821 concurrency
Guernsey	Byesville	16.63	26.76	I-77 / SR 821 end – Marietta, Cleveland	Exit 41 (I-77); eastern end of SR 821 concurrency
1.000 mi = 1.609 km; 1.000 km = 0.621 mi: Concurrency terminus
