= Wills Creek =

Wills Creek may refer to:

- Wills Creek (North Branch Potomac River), in Pennsylvania and Maryland
- Wills Creek (Ohio), a tributary of the Muskingum River
- Wills Creek, Ohio, an unincorporated community

== See also ==
- Little Wills Creek, a tributary of Wills Creek in Pennsylvania
