= Josh Sills =

American football player (born 1998)

No. 67 – New York Giants
- Position: Offensive guard
- Roster status: Active

Personal information
- Born: January 26, 1998 (age 28); Sarahsville, Ohio, U.S.
- Listed height: 6 ft 6 in (1.98 m)
- Listed weight: 325 lb (147 kg)

Career information
- High school: Meadowbrook (Byesville, Ohio)
- College: West Virginia (2016–2019); Oklahoma State (2020–2021)
- NFL draft: 2022: undrafted

Career history
- Philadelphia Eagles (2022); Indianapolis Colts (2023–2026)*; New York Giants (2026–present)
- * Offseason or practice squad member only

Awards and highlights
- 2× First-team All-Big 12 (2020, 2021); Second-team All-Big 12 (2018)

Career NFL statistics as of 2023
- Games played: 18
- Stats at Pro Football Reference

Joshua Matthew Sills (born January 26, 1998) is an American professional football offensive guard for the New York Giants of the National Football League (NFL). He played college football for the West Virginia Mountaineers and Oklahoma State Cowboys.

== Early life and college ==
Sills was born on January 26, 1998, and grew up in Sarahsville, Ohio. He attended Meadowbrook High School in Byesville, and was a two-year starter. He committed to West Virginia University, and spent his first year as a redshirt.

As a freshman in 2017, Sills played in 13 games and was a starter in 10, five of those at left guard and the other five at right guard. He appeared on 681 snaps and led the team with 13 knockdown blocks. Sills started 12 games in 2018, seeing action on 970 plays and being named second-team All-Big 12 Conference at the end of the season. He started two games in 2019 but missed the rest of the season.

Sills transferred to Oklahoma State University for the 2020 season. He started all 11 games that year and was a first-team All-Big 12 Conference pick. He announced he would return to the team for his senior year in January 2021. As a senior, he was voted team captain. He led the Oklahoma State in both knockdown blocks with 41 and pancake blocks with 21, earning a first-team All-Big 12 selection for the second consecutive year. He also received several votes for Big 12 Offensive Lineman of the Year, but did not win the award.

== Professional career ==
Pre-draft measurables
| Height | Weight | Arm length | Hand span | Wingspan | 40-yard dash | 10-yard split | 20-yard split | 20-yard shuttle | Three-cone drill | Vertical jump | Broad jump | Bench press |
|---|---|---|---|---|---|---|---|---|---|---|---|---|
| 6 ft 5 5/8 in (1.97 m) | 322 lb (146 kg) | 33 7/8 in (0.86 m) | 10 in (0.25 m) | 6 ft 11 3/8 in (2.12 m) | 5.25 s | 1.84 s | 2.96 s | 4.52 s | 7.52 s | 25.0 in (0.64 m) | 8 ft 6 in (2.59 m) | 18 reps |
All values from Pro Day

=== Philadelphia Eagles ===
Sills declared for the NFL draft on January 5, 2022. He went unselected in the draft, but was later signed by the Philadelphia Eagles as an undrafted free agent. He was one of three 2022 undrafted players to make the Eagles' final roster, along with Reed Blankenship and Josh Jobe. Sills played in only one game as a rookie, appearing on several special teams snaps in week five against the Arizona Cardinals.

Sills was placed on the commissioner's exempt list on February 1, 2023, shortly before the Super Bowl, after his indictment for rape and kidnapping charges. He was activated from the commissioner's exempt list after he was found not guilty of those charges. He was waived at the final roster cuts, on August 29, 2023.

=== Indianapolis Colts ===
After being waived by the Eagles, Sills was claimed off waivers by the Indianapolis Colts. He was waived/injured on August 19, 2024. Sills was re-signed to the practice squad on October 29. He signed a reserve/future contract with the Colts on January 6, 2025.

On August 26, 2025, Sills was waived by the Colts as a part of final roster cuts and re-signed to the practice squad the next day. He signed a reserve/future contract with Indianapolis on January 5, 2026.

On August 30, 2026, Sills was released by the Colts as a part of final roster cuts; he was re-signed to the team's practice squad the following day.

=== New York Giants ===
On October 21, 2026, Sills was signed by the New York Giants off the Colts practice squad.

== Personal life ==
Sills' parents, John and Kim, have traveled to every one of his football games since he was nine years old (with the exception of one), racking up over 232,000 miles (373,000 km) on their 2013 Nissan Altima.

On January 31, 2023, Sills was indicted by a grand jury in Guernsey County, Ohio on rape and kidnapping charges stemming from allegations that he forcibly restrained and raped a woman in December 2019. On August 4, he was acquitted of all charges, and removed from the commissioner's exempt list.
