= KCDI =

KCDI may refer to:

- Cambridge Municipal Airport (Ohio) (ICAO code KCDI)
- KCDI-LP, a low-power radio station (99.7 FM) licensed to serve Dodge City, Kansas, United States
