= Ohio State Route 662 =

State highway in central Ohio, US

State Route 662

Route information
- Maintained by ODOT
- Length: 8.18 mi (13.16 km)
- Existed: 1937–present

Major junctions
- South end: SR 209 near Cambridge
- North end: SR 93 near Plainfield

Location
- Country: United States
- State: Ohio
- Counties: Guernsey, Muskingum, Coshocton

Highway system
- Ohio State Highway System; Interstate; US; State; Scenic
| ← SR 661 | → SR 663 |

State Route 662 (SR 662, OH 662) is a north–south state highway in the central part of Ohio, a U.S. state. The southern terminus of the route is at a T-intersection with State Route 209 nearly 5.50 miles (8.85 km) northwest of the city of Cambridge. Its northern terminus is also at a T-intersection, this time with State Route 93 approximately 3.50 miles (5.63 km) south of the village of Plainfield.

== Route description ==
Along its way, State Route 662 passes through western Guernsey County, extreme northeastern Muskingum County and southeastern Coshocton County. The route is not a part of the National Highway System, a network of highways deemed most important for the nation's economy, mobility and defense.

== History ==
State Route 662 was established in 1937 along the alignment that it currently occupies. It has not experienced any major changes to its routing since its inception.

== Major intersections ==
| County | Location | mi | km | Destinations | Notes |
|---|---|---|---|---|---|
| Guernsey | Adams Township | 0.00 | 0.00 | SR 209 (Bloomfield Road) | |
| Muskingum | No major junctions | | | | |
| Coshocton | Linton Township | 8.18 | 13.16 | SR 93 | |
1.000 mi = 1.609 km; 1.000 km = 0.621 mi
