= Cambridge Glass =

Glass company of Cambridge, Ohio, US

Cambridge Glass Company
- Company type: Corporation
- Industry: Glass manufacturer
- Founded: 1873
- Headquarters: Cambridge, Ohio, USA
- Key people: Arthur J. Bennett, President; Wilber L. Orme, Vice President; K.C. Kelley, Factory Superintendent

Cambridge Glass was a manufacturer of glassware formed in 1873 in Cambridge, Ohio. The company produced a range of coloured glassware in the 1920s, initially with opaque shades, but moving on to transparent shades by the end of the decade. Unable to compete with mass-produced glassware, the company closed briefly in 1954, but was reopened in 1955. However, financial difficulties persisted, and, after several ownership changes, the factory closed for good in 1958. Imperial Glass Company purchased the Cambridge Glass molds two years later, and would use them for another three decades until that company went bankrupt in 1984.

== Early history ==
The Cambridge Glass Company was chartered in 1873 by a group of Cambridge, Ohio businessmen. But it was not until 1899, when the site was purchased by the newly formed National Glass Company, that funds became available to start the construction of this new glass factory.

In 1901, The Cambridge Glass Company was organized by Myron Case, Casey Morris, Addison Thompson, Andy Herron and Fred Rosemond, who were owners of the National Glass Company of Pennsylvania.

== Under Arthur J. Bennett's Leadership ==
During construction of the plant, Arthur J. Bennett, a native of England, was hired to manage this new factory. Having experience in the china and glass trades, Mr. Bennett proved to be an excellent choice for the position. He was funded to come to America by his father who was a plumber in England. (Nicole Orme) The first piece of glass, a three pint pitcher, was produced in May 1902.

A variety of heavy pressed patterns were produced during the next five years. Many of the patterns were of Mr. Bennett's own design. Sometime around 1903-1904 the company's first trademark came into being, the words "Near Cut" pressed into the glass.

Cambridge Glass soon became known worldwide for quality in both "crystal and colors, pressed and blown."

In 1907, the National Glass Company experienced financial problems that ended in receivership for the company. By supplementing his life savings with local bank financing, Mr. Bennett was able to raise the necessary $500,000 to purchase the Cambridge Glass Company in its entirety.

The company continued to prosper under his ownership, and in 1910 was expanded to include an additional plant at nearby Byesville, Ohio – under the name of The Byesville Glass and Lamp Co. Many of the deep plate etched patterns were introduced during this time period, some of which were Marjorie and Betty, named after members of Mr. Bennett's family.

Through these early years, the company operated its own coal mines and consumed 50 tons daily producing raw gas to fire its melting pots. It also used natural gas produced from its own wells. The abundant supply of natural resources had been one of the main reasons for locating this factory in Ohio.

During 1916, things slowed quite a bit, and in 1917 it was decided to close the factory in Byesville and transfer those operations back to the Cambridge plant.

The 1920s were years of expansion and heralded a new trademark - the letter "C" enclosed within a triangle. Mr. Bennett decided to introduce a variety of opaque colored items into their line. With as many as 700 employees working three shifts a day, very strong lines of colored ware and complete dinner services were added to the production from the 56 pots of glass being used. Figural shapes became popular in the occasional pieces. The company was also producing a complete line of pharmaceutical items. It was said, "If it will sell, Cambridge will produce it."

The 1930s were perhaps the most prolific years of Cambridge development, with the new colors (Carmen, Royal Blue, Crown Tuscan and Heatherbloom), and new patterns, (#3400 line, Caprice line, Statuesque stem line, Rose Point etching) being developed.

== Leadership change ==
During the peak of the Cambridge Glass Company, Mr. Bennett served as president of the company, his son-in-law, Wilber L. Orme was vice president; Mrs. Bennett as director; William C. McCartney as secretary; G. Roy Boyd as treasurer and K.C. Kelley as factory superintendent.

In July 1939, Mr. Bennett sold the controlling interest of the company to his son-in-law, Wilber L. Orme, who continued to develop designs and colors. However, Mr. Bennett continued as president until his death in February 1940.

In 1950, the Cambridge Square pattern won top honors across the United States for its modern design. In the early 1950s the demand for fine handmade glassware began to decrease, and the competition of foreign and machine-made glass began taking its toll.

In 1954, Mr. Orme decided to close the plant, ending one of the best and most prosperous glass companies the world has ever known.

== Cambridge Colors ==
Color played a significant role in the success of Cambridge Glass Co. They produced opaque glass and then moved onto transparent colors. The opaque shades were produced in early 1920s with colors such as helio, jade, primrose, azurite and ebony. In the latter of the 1920s there was a shift to transparent colors in light colors. In the 1930s, the company moved to darker colors such as forest, amethyst and royal blue. Towards the end of the 1930s, most of the lines made were done in crystal. One of the darker colors they started to use was the amethyst which they invented and patented (reliable source the granddaughter.)

== Sidney Albert, Imperial Glass ==
Shortly after closing in 1954, the company was sold to a firm headed by Sidney Albert of Akron, Ohio. The plant reopened in March 1955. Sales were very poor, and in 1956 Morrison Industries Ltd. of Boston, Massachusetts, acquired possession. Sales continued to be slow and with management problems. The company closed its doors for the final time in 1958.

In November 1960, Imperial Glass Company of Bellaire, Ohio, acquired the Cambridge molds and equipment.

1984 saw Imperial forced into bankruptcy. At this time the National Cambridge Collectors purchased many of the molds, all of the etching/decorating plates and other assets of Cambridge Glass from Imperial. These items are now located on the museum grounds. The N.C.C., due to a lack of funds and miscommunication, could not purchase all of the molds. Some are now owned by other glass companies.

== Demolition of factory ==
The Cambridge Glass factory building was demolished in 1989 when the owners decided the factory had deteriorated beyond repair. All the buildings were razed.
