= Broom Building =

- U.S. National Register of Historic Places
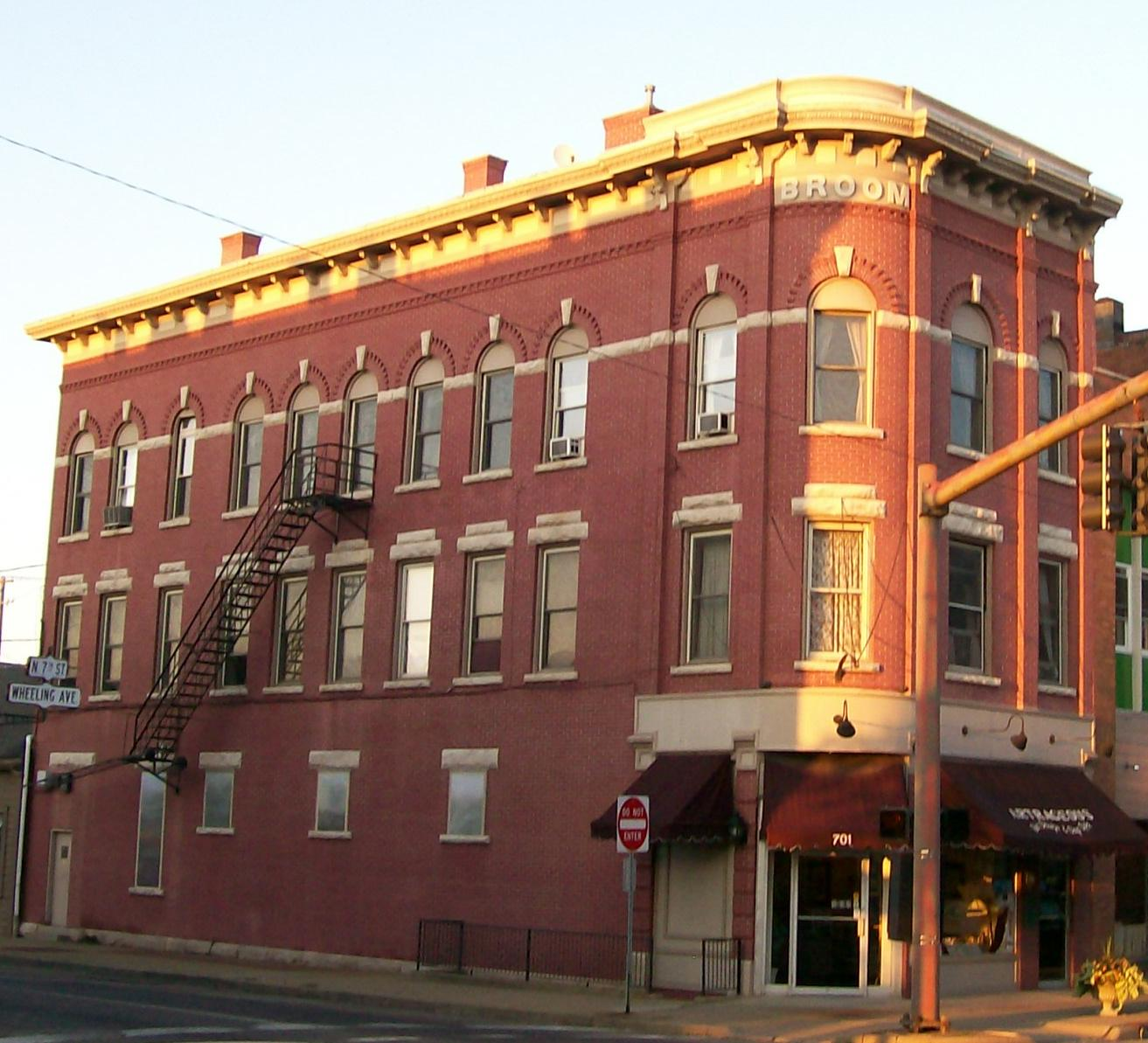
- The Broom Building in 2009.

- Location within Ohio Location within the United States
- Location: 701 Wheeling Ave., Cambridge, Ohio
- Coordinates: 40°1′30″N 81°35′31″W
- Area: 0.9 acres (0.36 ha)
- Built: 1890
- Architectural style: Italianate
- NRHP reference No.: 83001976
- Added to NRHP: February 17, 1983

The Broom Building is located at 701 Wheeling Avenue in Cambridge, Ohio, United States. The property was listed on the National Register on February 17, 1983.

== History ==
The property was purchased by Adam Broom in the late nineteenth century for commercial purposes. He built a large building in 1890 in the Italianate style and operated his grocery at the site until the turn of the century. The building was then purchased by William Harper, another grocer, who ran his store at the location from 1901 until 1917. The building was also used for the Practical Business College.

== Appearance ==
The three-story brick building is rectangular in shape to fit its lot. The corner of the building is rounded off and contains the main entrance. Another entrance is located to the right of the main entrance with a large picture window in between. Small rectangular windows line the west facade and illuminate the interior ground floor. Stone surrounds the entrances and windows and breaks up the monotony of the brick face. The second floor contains long rectangular windows which are set within rusticated stone blocks. Brick pilasters line the walls along the rounded corner and are set with windows in between. All windows on this floor are 1/1 sash. The third floor is lined with the same 1/1 sash windows as the floor below, but are surmounted by a brick arch with a decorative keystone of rusticated stone. A stone belt course also lines the third floor at the top of the windows and runs the entire length of the building. A stone block is located on the rounded corner and bears the word "Broom" in large block letters. The flat roof sets on a metal cornice with a panelled frieze and egg and dart moulding. The overhang is supported by consoles and foliated ornament. Large red brick chimneys rise from the roof.

== Historic site ==
In early 1983, the Broom Building was listed on the National Register of Historic Places, qualifying because of its historically significant architecture. Critical to its designation was its status as one of Cambridge's few remaining Italianate buildings without major modifications: numerous Italianate buildings once lined Wheeling Avenue downtown, but few have survived to the present.
