= Helio (Cambridge Glass) =

Helio (Cambridge Glass) is a type of glassware produced by Cambridge Glass, beginning in 1923. The color of Helio has been described as part of the purple family and has been compared to the color lavender. It also falls into the category of opaque glass, but the color changes depend on the light source. The variation of purple differs between pieces, but the color is consistent within the piece itself.

It is believed that Helio was only produced for a short time because it is not mentioned in trade journals after 1924.

== Design ==
The majority of the pieces produced were of simple design, free of any decoration for the most part, although there are some with a gold leaf pattern or a black-dragon design. This is true for any of the opaque colors made in the 1920s.

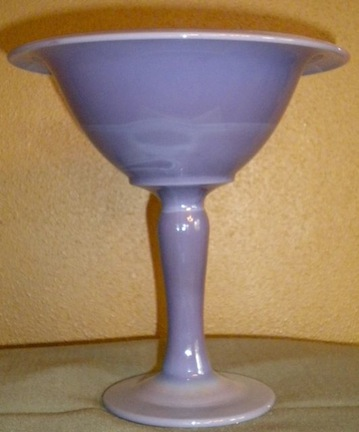
Helio Compote

== Heliotrope ==
Collectors of Helio will also refer to it as Heliotrope because of the color of the glass, but that name has not been found in any printed material from Cambridge Glass.

== History of the colors in Cambridge Glass ==
The colors of Cambridge Glass were a main selling point. When the first catalog came out in 1903, it was in color. The number and variety of colors is unclear. In the early 1970s it was thought that there were around 35 colors, but as of 1984 newly discovered colors brought the total to around 50.

Other colors of opaque glass include Ebony, Ivory, Primrose, Azurite, Jade and Avocado.

== Chemists ==
Most of the records of the colors created by the chemists at Cambridge Glass have not survived, little is known about the chemists themselves. Arnold Fielder worked at Cambridge from around 1916–17 until the mid-1920s. He is thought to have produced most of the colors during that time.
