= Meadowbrook High School (Byesville, Ohio) =

Location
- 58615 Marietta Road; Byesville, Ohio 43723; United States
- Coordinates: 40°3′10.3″N 81°35′4.8″W

Information
- Type: Public high school
- School district: Rolling Hills Local School District
- Superintendent: Devvon Dettra
- Principal: Scott Golec
- Teaching staff: 27.75 (FTE)
- Grades: 9-12
- Student to teacher ratio: 14.95
- Colors: Orange and Brown
- Athletics conference: Muskingum Valley League
- Team name: Colts
- Website: mbhs.rollinghills.k12.oh.us

Meadowbrook High School is a public high school in Byesville, Ohio, United States. It is the only high school in the Rolling Hills Local School District. Athletic teams compete as the Meadowbrook Colts in the Ohio High School Athletic Association as a member of the Muskingum Valley League.

== OHSAA State Championships ==
Girls Basketball - 1989

== Notable alumni ==
- Dom Capers - current defensive coordinator of the Green Bay Packers; former head coach of the Carolina Panthers and the Houston Texans
- Rex M. Rogers - university president, author
- Josh Sills - American football offensive guard for the Philadelphia Eagles of the National Football League (NFL)
