= Herbert F. Christian =

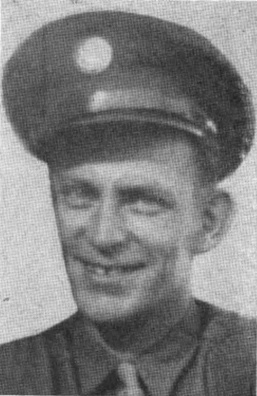
- Christian in uniform, between 1942 and 1944
- Born: June 18, 1912; Byesville, Ohio, U.S.
- Died: June 3, 1944 (aged 31) near Valmontone, Italy
- Burial place: Greenwood Cemetery, Byesville, Ohio
- Military career
- Allegiance: United States of America
- Branch: United States Army
- Service years: 1942–1944
- Rank: Private
- Units: 15th Infantry Regiment, 3rd Infantry Division
- Conflicts: World War II: Operation Diadem †
- Awards: Medal of Honor

Herbert F. Christian (June 18, 1912 – June 3, 1944) was a United States Army soldier and a recipient of the United States military's highest decoration—the Medal of Honor—for his actions in World War II. Christian was posthumously awarded the Medal of Honor for sacrificing himself by drawing German fire during the advance on Rome in order to allow his patrol to escape an ambush.

== Biography ==
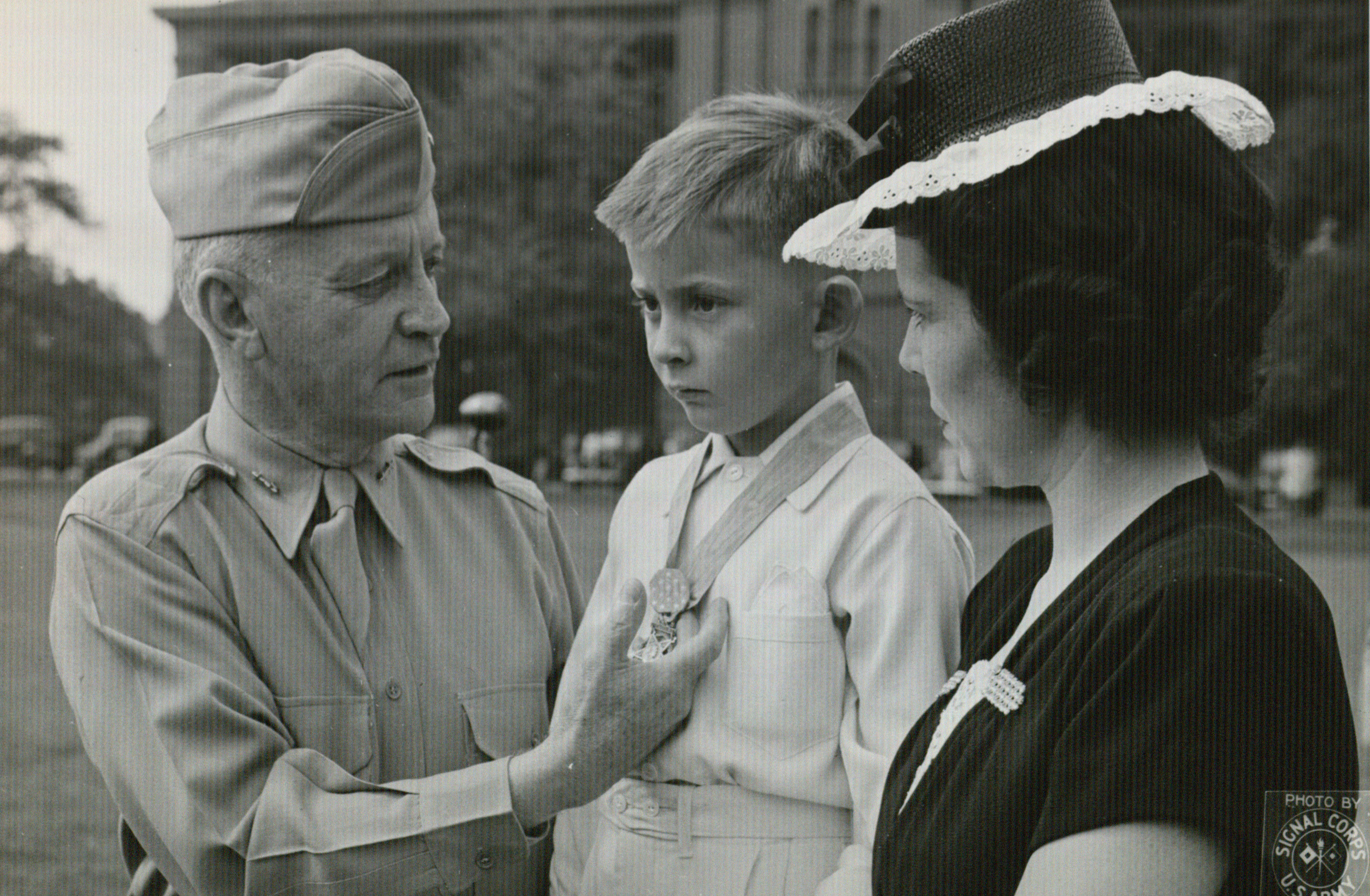
Christian's Medal of Honor being presented to his son

Christian was born on June 18, 1912, in Byesville, Ohio, the son of John G. Christian and Nellie Arthurs. He was a former inmate of the Ohio Boys' Industrial School, a reform school. Christian, then a truck driver, married saleswoman Katherine Hoffman on 27 January 1939, and had a son with her in 1940. He subsequently worked as an insurance salesman in Canton, Ohio.

Christian was drafted into the Army under Selective Service from Steubenville, Ohio in November 1942, and by June 1944 he was serving as a private in the Company E of the 15th Infantry Regiment of the 3rd Infantry Division.

With a patrol from the company, Christian moved out to cross Highway 6 near Valmontone and conduct a reconnaissance of the surroundings at 23:00 on June 2 during the advance on Rome. By 01:00 on the next day they had mostly finished their task, but were ambushed from three sides in a clearing, coming under fire from three tanks, three machine guns, and at least sixty infantry. The patrol's second-in-command later reported that the patrol leader was quickly killed and its survivors went to the ground. The latter witnessed Christian, a Thompson gunner, and the patrol's Browning Automatic Rifle man, Private Elden H. Johnson, stand up to divert German attention and signal for the patrol to move to the rear. Christian was soon hit by a 20 mm round that nearly severed his leg, but continued to crawl forward and fire upon the German infantry, killing and wounding at least three. Within ten yards of the German positions, he emptied his gun into a German machine pistol man, reloaded and managed a last burst before he was killed by German fire. For these actions, he was posthumously awarded the Medal of Honor a year later, on May 30, 1945; Johnson, who had been killed about the same time, also received the award.

The Medal of Honor was presented to his five-year-old son by 5th Service Command commanding general James Lawton Collins in a Fort Hayes ceremony on June 18, 1945, which would have been Christian's 33rd birthday. Christian's wife also survived him, and was present at the ceremony. Christian, aged 31 at his death, was buried at Greenwood Cemetery in Byesville.

A youth camp for reform school inmates named for him was dedicated at the Ohio State Fair in 1965. The camp was closed in 1972 after a fire set by an inmate spread to the fairgrounds, causing five million dollars' worth of damage.

== Medal of Honor citation ==
Private Christian's official Medal of Honor citation reads:

For conspicuous gallantry and intrepidity at risk of life above and beyond the call of duty. On 2–3 June 1944, at 1 a.m., Pvt. Christian elected to sacrifice his life in order that his comrades might extricate themselves from an ambush. Braving massed fire of about 60 riflemen, 3 machineguns, and 3 tanks from positions only 30 yards distant, he stood erect and signaled to the patrol to withdraw. The whole area was brightly illuminated by enemy flares. Although his right leg was severed above the knee by cannon fire, Pvt. Christian advanced on his left knee and the bloody stump of his right thigh, firing his submachine gun. Despite excruciating pain, Pvt. Christian continued on his self-assigned mission. He succeeded in distracting the enemy and enabled his 12 comrades to escape. He killed 3 enemy soldiers almost at once. Leaving a trail of blood behind him, he made his way forward 20 yards, halted at a point within 10 yards of the enemy, and despite intense fire killed a machine-pistol man. Reloading his weapon, he fired directly into the enemy position. The enemy appeared enraged at the success of his ruse, concentrated 20-mm. machinegun, machine-pistol and rifle fire on him, yet he refused to seek cover. Maintaining his erect position, Pvt. Christian fired his weapon to the very last. Just as he emptied his submachinegun, the enemy bullets found their mark and Pvt. Christian slumped forward dead. The courage and spirit of self-sacrifice displayed by this soldier were an inspiration to his comrades and are in keeping with the highest traditions of the armed forces.

== See also ==
- List of Medal of Honor recipients
- List of Medal of Honor recipients for World War II
