= Ohio State Route 657 =

State highway in central Ohio, US

State Route 657

Route information
- Maintained by ODOT
- Length: 19.84 mi (31.93 km)
- Existed: 1937–present

Major junctions
- South end: SR 13 near Newark
- US 62 near Utica
- North end: US 36 / SR 3 near Centerburg

Location
- Country: United States
- State: Ohio
- Counties: Licking, Knox

Highway system
- Ohio State Highway System; Interstate; US; State; Scenic
← SR 656	→ SR 658

State Route 657 (SR 657) is a state highway in central Ohio, a U.S. state. While signed as a north–south route, State Route 657 actually travels in a northwest–southeast fashion. The southern terminus of the route is at a T-intersection with SR 13 immediately north of the city limits of Newark. Its northern terminus is at a T-intersection with the concurrency of US 36 and SR 3 about 1 mile (1.6 km) northeast of Centerburg.

== Route description ==
This state highway passes through the northwestern quadrant of Licking County and the southwestern corner of Knox County. SR 657 is not included as a part of the National Highway System, a system of routes deemed most important for the nation's economy, mobility and defense.

== History ==
SR 657 was established in 1937 along the routing between SR 13 and the US 36/SR 3 concurrency that it occupies today. No significant changes have taken place to the routing of SR 657 since its designation.

== Major intersections ==
County	Location	mi	km	Destinations	Notes
Licking	Newton Township	0.00	0.00	SR 13 (Mount Vernon Road)	
Licking	Burlington Township	7.44	11.97	SR 661 (North Street) / Riley Road	
Licking	Burlington Township	9.90	15.93	US 62 (Johnstown Utica Road)	
Knox	Hilliar Township	19.84	31.93	US 36 / SR 3 (Columbus Road) – Centerburg	
1.000 mi = 1.609 km; 1.000 km = 0.621 mi
