= Orville Singer =

American baseball player (born 1898)

- Second baseman / Corner outfielder
- Born: December 27, 1898; Cambridge, Ohio, U.S.
- Died: June 29, 1985 (aged 86); Dorset, Ohio, U.S.
- Batted: Unknown Threw: Right

Negro league baseball debut
- 1921, for the New York Lincoln Giants

Last appearance
- 1932, for the Cleveland Stars

Teams
- New York Lincoln Giants (1921–1926); Cleveland Browns (1924); Cleveland Tigers (1928); Cleveland Cubs (1931); Cleveland Stars (1932)

Orville Willis Singer (December 27, 1898 – June 29, 1985) was an American professional baseball second baseman and corner outfielder in the Negro leagues.

He was born in Cambridge, Ohio and played most years for the Lincoln Giants club, then played the rest of his seasons for Cleveland, Ohio teams.

Singer died at the age of 86 in Dorset, Ohio.
