= Ohio State Route 661 =

State highway in central Ohio, US

State Route 661

Route information
- Maintained by ODOT
- Length: 22.22 mi (35.76 km)
- Existed: 1937–present

Major junctions
- South end: SR 16 / SR 37 near Granville
- US 62 near Utica
- North end: SR 13 in Mount Vernon

Location
- Country: United States
- State: Ohio
- Counties: Licking, Knox

Highway system
- Ohio State Highway System; Interstate; US; State; Scenic
← SR 660	→ SR 662

State Route 661 (SR 661) is a 22.22-mile (35.76 km) long north–south state highway in the central portion of the U.S. state of Ohio. The southern terminus of SR 661 is at a diamond interchange with SR 16 and SR 37 just 0.25 miles (0.40 km) south of Granville. SR 661 has its northern terminus at a signalized T-intersection with SR 13 in the southern end of Mount Vernon.

== Route description ==
SR 661 travels through northern Licking County and southern Knox County. No portion of this state route is included within the National Highway System (NHS). The NHS is a network of highways identified as being most important for the economy, mobility and defense of the nation.

== History ==
The SR 661 designation was created in 1937. It was originally routed along its current path between Granville, at the eastern intersection with Broadway Avenue, the former routing of SR 16, and the southern end of Mount Vernon. However, instead of turning east onto Blackjack Road, as it does now, it continued north along Granville Road up to where it meets SR 13 just south of downtown Mount Vernon. That point marked the original northern terminus of SR 661.

By 1964, a new freeway opened to the south of Granville. SR 16 was re-routed off of Broadway Avenue onto the by-pass. Consequently, SR 661 was extended a short distance to the south by following Broadway Avenue west to Main Street, and then heading south along the former routing of SR 37 to the interchange with the SR 16/SR 37 freeway that currently marks the southern terminus of SR 661. On the northern end, SR 661 was re-routed off of Granville Road onto Blackjack Road heading east to a new terminus at SR 13 in the southern end of Mount Vernon in 1983.

== Major intersections ==
County	Location	mi	km	Destinations	Notes
Licking	Granville Township	0.00	0.00	SR 16 / SR 37 (Lancaster Road) – Columbus, Newark, Lancaster	Interchange
Licking	Burlington Township	9.47	15.24	SR 657 (Marion Road) / Riley Road	
Licking	Burlington Township	12.05	19.39	US 62 (Johnstown Utica Road) – Johnstown, Utica	
Knox	Mount Vernon	22.22	35.76	SR 13 (Newark Road)	
1.000 mi = 1.609 km; 1.000 km = 0.621 mi
