= Wills Creek, Ohio =

Unincorporated community in Ohio, U.S.

Coordinates: 40°10′48″N 81°51′02″W

Wills Creek is an unincorporated community in Coshocton County, in the U.S. state of Ohio.

== History ==
Wills Creek had its start when Frew's Mill was built there. The community took its name from nearby Wills Creek. A post office was established at Wills Creek in 1840, and was discontinued in 1904.
