= Birds Run, Ohio =

Unincorporated community in Ohio, U.S.

Coordinates: 40°10′08″N 81°38′50″W

Birds Run is an unincorporated community in Guernsey County, in the U.S. state of Ohio.

== History ==
Birds Run was originally called Bridgeville, and under the latter name was laid out in 1848. A post office called Birds Run was established in 1851, and remained in operation until 1953. Besides the post office, Birds Run had a country store and two churches.
