= Wills Creek (Ohio) =

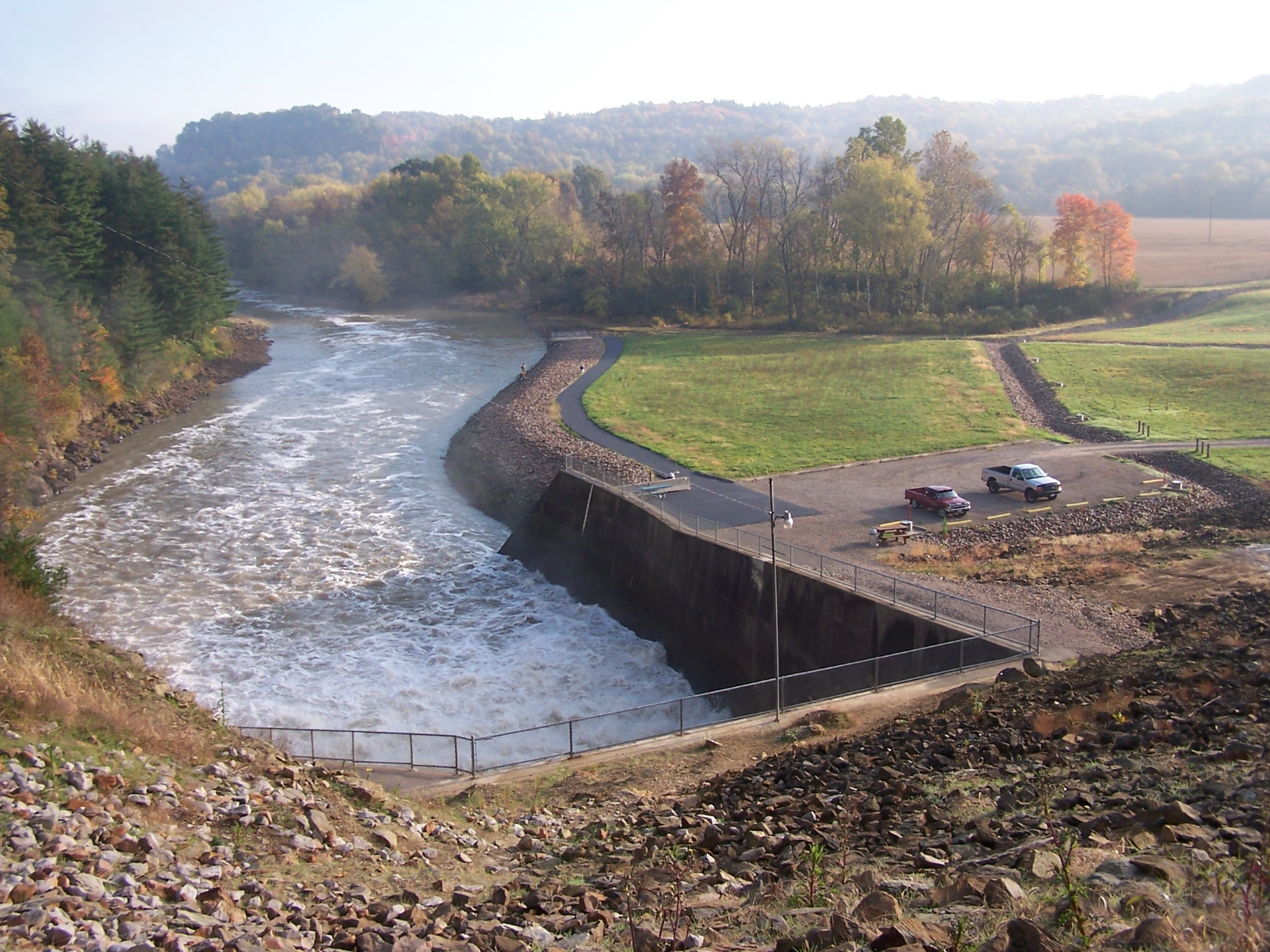
- Wills Creek near its mouth, flowing from Wills Creek Dam

Location
- Country: U.S.

Physical characteristics
- Mouth
  - location: Muskingum River on the border of Muskingum and Coshocton counties
  - elevation: 715 ft (218 m)
- Length: 92.2 mi (148.4 km)
- Basin size: 853 sq mi (2,210 km^{2})
- Discharge
  - location: USGS gauge, Wills Creek Dam at Wills Creek
  - average: 883.5 cu ft/s (25.02 m^{3}/s), water years 1985-1991
- Discharge
  - location: mouth
  - average: 1,025.4 cu ft/s (29.04 m^{3}/s) (estimate)

Basin features
- Tributaries
  - right: Leatherwood Creek

Wills Creek is a tributary of the Muskingum River, 92.2 mi (148.4 km) long, in eastern Ohio in the United States. Via the Muskingum and Ohio Rivers, it is part of the watershed of the Mississippi River. It drains an area of 853 mi^{2} (2,209 km^{2}).

The United States Board on Geographic Names settled on "Wills Creek" as the stream's name in 1963. According to the Geographic Names Information System, it has also been known historically as "Cou-wach-en-ink" and as "Will's Creek."

Wills Creek is formed by a confluence of short forks near Pleasant City in southern Guernsey County, and initially flows northwardly through Byesville, Cambridge and Kimbolton. Near Kimbolton it turns westwardly and flows through southeastern Coshocton and northeastern Muskingum Counties, past Plainfield, to its mouth at the Muskingum River, 8 mi (13 km) south of the city of Coshocton.

Near its mouth, a flood-control dam causes the creek to form Wills Creek Lake.

== 2005 flood ==
On January 16, 2005, the Wills Creek Dam 40°09′22″N 81°50′51″W became the only dam in the Army Corps of Engineers Huntington District's history (established 1938) to reach its spillway elevation and have water flow uncontrolled over the top of the spillway. On that day Wills Creek Lake was 37 feet (11 m) above its normal level of 749 feet (228 m) (above sea level), and spanned 20,452 acres (82.77 km^{2}), causing it to be the largest man-made lake in the state of Ohio.

This extreme event was caused by an average of 5 to 8 inches (130 to 200 mm) of rain falling over Central Indiana and Ohio during January 4–14, 2005. This rain combined with snow melt and saturated ground to produce record breaking runoff. Other reservoirs in the Huntington District also set pool level records, including Alum Creek, Deer Creek, Delaware Lake, Paint Creek, Atwood Lake, Bolivar Dam, Charles Mill Lake, Dillon Lake, Dover Dam and Mohawk Dam.

== See also ==
- List of rivers of Ohio
