= Claysville, Ohio =

Unincorporated community in Ohio, U.S.

Coordinates: 39°56′10″N 81°40′13″W

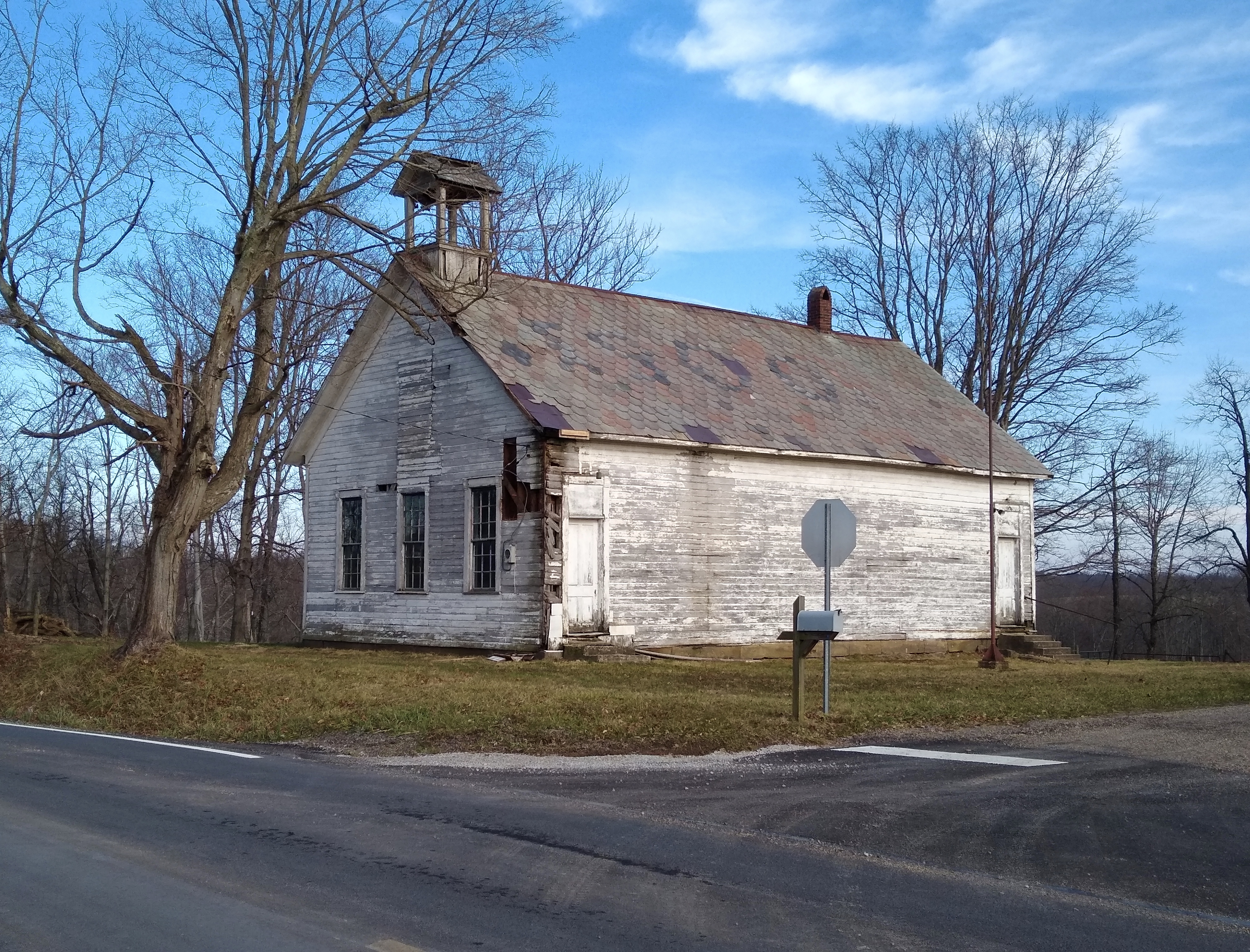
Abandoned schoolhouse in Claysville, Ohio

Claysville is an unincorporated community in Guernsey County, in the U.S. state of Ohio.

== History ==
Claysville was platted in 1828 on the Clay Pike, from which the community took its name. A post office called Claysville has been in operation since 1830.
