= Cambridge Municipal Airport (Ohio) =

- IATA: none; ICAO: KCDI; FAA LID: CDI

Summary
- Airport type: Public
- Owner: Cambridge Area Regional Airport Authority
- Serves: Cambridge, Ohio
- Location: Guernsey County, Ohio
- Time zone: UTC−05:00 (-5)
  - Summer (DST): UTC−04:00 (-4)
- Elevation AMSL: 799 ft (244 m)
- Coordinates: 39°58′30″N 081°34′39″W
- Website: www.cambridgeohioairport.com

Map
- Location within Ohio Location within the United States

Runways
| Direction | Length | | Surface |
| Direction | ft | m | Surface |
|---|---|---|---|
| 4/22 | 4,298 | 1,310 | Asphalt |

Statistics (2022)
- Aircraft operations: 1,352
- Based aircraft: 14
- Source: Federal Aviation Administration

Cambridge Municipal Airport (ICAO: KCDI, FAA LID: CDI) is three miles south of Cambridge, in Guernsey County, Ohio. The FAA's National Plan of Integrated Airport Systems for 2011–2015 categorized it as a general aviation facility.

Many U.S. airports use the same three-letter location identifier for the FAA and IATA, but this facility is CDI to the FAA and has no IATA code.

== History ==
After the land on which the city's existing airport sat was annexed in February 1957, it was auctioned for industrial development in September. The $47,000 generated by the sale was then put into a fund that was later set aside specifically for the construction of a new airport. (Note: Subsequently, Cambridge moved to consider jointly operating the Zanesville Municipal Airport with its epynonmous city.) By early March 1963, when the city requested federal aid, the fund had grown to approximately $56,000. A just-under $128,000 federal grant for the construction of an airport was approved in early September 1965.

Efforts to secure land for a new airport began as early as late October 1966. A $100,000 grant was approved by the state in early November. Even before the contract had been awarded, the lowest of the four bidders started clearing land at the site. Less than a week later, the city acquired approximately 76 acres (31 ha) from four landowners for the airport. An additional federal grant was accepted in early December.

By early August 1967, the site preparation was nearly complete, but poor weather and a strike had delayed progress. Eventually, by early May 1968, construction on the base for the 3,500-foot (1,100 m) runway had begun. Although it was still technically owned by the contractor and had not been certified, aircraft were using the airport by early October. By mid November, the airport had been approved by the Federal Aviation Administration, but not the Ohio Department of Aviation. (Note: Dual approval from was necessary as the airport had received both federal and state grants.)

As of late April 1970, the disbursement of the final portion of the federal grant was being held up by the lack of agreements on easements. By late August, the airport had still not been officially dedicated. By mid December, completion of the airport was being held up by only $1,500 and a single landowner refusing to allow an easement.

By late October 1971, a limited amount of parking space and absence of lighting was causing problems. A project to install lights was authorized by the FAA the following month. Installation of the system, which involved a new "plow in" method of laying cable, began in early January 1972. Although the approach lights were in use by the start of March, more lights and navigational equipment was necessary before it could be approved for all-weather capability.

The Cambridge Municipal Airport had been completed by mid April 1975, but the city was in a dispute with the FAA over the amount of funds still owed. A board of directors was announced, a part-time manager hired, and a 720-square-foot (67 m^{2}) trailer installed as an office two months later. A contractor was hired to carry out an airport development study in mid May 1977.

The airport received a grant to resurface the runway in July 1985.

In 2002, the airport received a federal grant for runway improvements and perimeter fencing.

In 2013, a gas and oil development near the airport exploded, necessitating repairs at the airport. Updates include the replacement of two obstruction light poles and compliance issues essential for a runway extension. The rotating beacon was also replaced.

In 2020, the airport received a federal grant to purchase 2.77 acres (1.12 ha) of land in the flight path of the runway and conduct an obstruction study.

In 2022, the airport received $1.3 million from the Federal Aviation Administration to rebuild its ramp and rehabilitate a taxilane. The money funded the airport's first major renovation in 20 years and was aimed to prevent aircraft damage caused by excavation and fuel tank removals.

== Facilities ==
The airport covers 75 acres (30 ha) at an elevation of 799 feet (244 m). Its single runway, 4/22, is 4,298 by 75 feet (1,310 x 23 m) asphalt.

For the 12-month period ending June 3, 2022 the airport had 1,352 aircraft operations, average 26 per week: 62% general aviation, 35% air taxi, and 3% military. For the same time period, 14 aircraft were based at the airport: 11 single-aisle airplanes, 2 ultralights, and 1 helicopter. These are down from 6,040 and 22 based aircraft in 2010.

The airport has a fixed-base operator that sells fuel, both avgas and jet fuel, and offers amenities such as aircraft hangars, courtesy cars, internet, conference rooms, a crew lounge, snooze rooms, and more.

An airplane is mounted on a pedestal in front of the airport as a memorial to Major James "Bill" Reed, a local pilot who was killed in the Vietnam War.

== Accidents and incidents ==
- On May 1, 2004, an experimental VM-1 Esqual was substantially damaged during an attempted takeoff from Cambridge Municipal Airport. The pilot reported that when he set the throttle to takeoff power, the airplane "started pulling abruptly to the left." The pilot applied "strong right rudder" in an effort to counteract the turning, but the aircraft did not respond. The airplane then veered off of runway, struck runway lights, and went into a creek. A post-accident investigation found that the aircraft's left wheel brake was dragging due to a lack of clearance between the brake pad and the brake rotor. The lack of clearance was attributable to the design of the brakes and their adaptation from a motorcycle to an airplane. The probable cause of the accident was found to be the pilot's failure to maintain directional control, with the aircraft's inadequate brake system as a contributing factor.
- On January 5, 2011, a Pegasus 503 Sport aircraft was returning from a local solo flight when the aircraft impacted trees and terrain about 200 feet short of the runway. The student solo pilot reported that the approach was normal, but his power input did not successfully recover altitude. The pilot said that the aircraft may have encountered a downdraft on short final. The probable cause of the accident was found to be the pilot's failure to maintain clearance from trees and terrain during the landing approach.
- On April 11, 2015, an Aeronca 7AC Champion was damaged during taxi at the Cambridge Municipal Airport. The pilot reported that he had landed and was beginning to taxi when a gust of wind lifted the left wing. He added engine power and attempted to correct; however, he was unable to maintain control. The airplane subsequently departed the runway pavement, encountered a ditch, and overturned. The probable cause of the accident was found to be the pilot's failure to maintain control of the airplane while encountering a wind gust after landing.

== See also ==
- List of airports in Ohio
