= Byesville, Ohio =

- Village
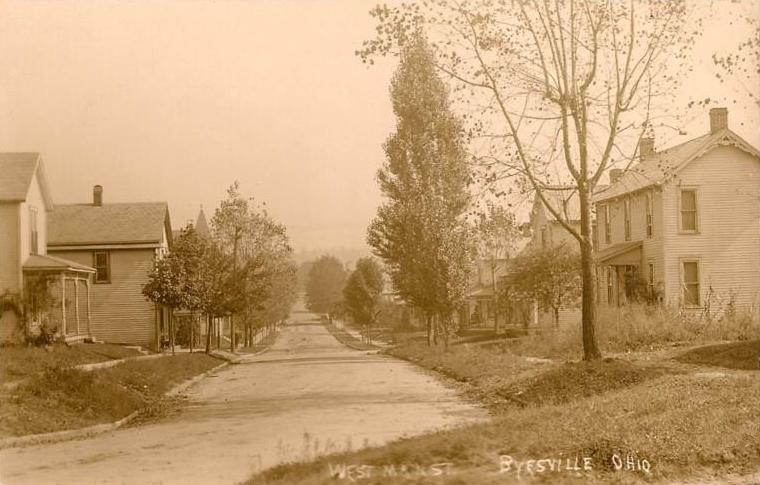
- West Main Street, c. 1910
- Nickname: Bye's Mill
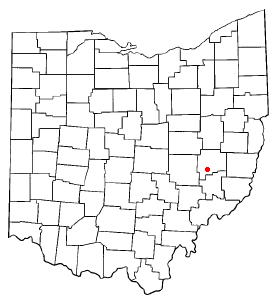
- Location of Byesville, Ohio

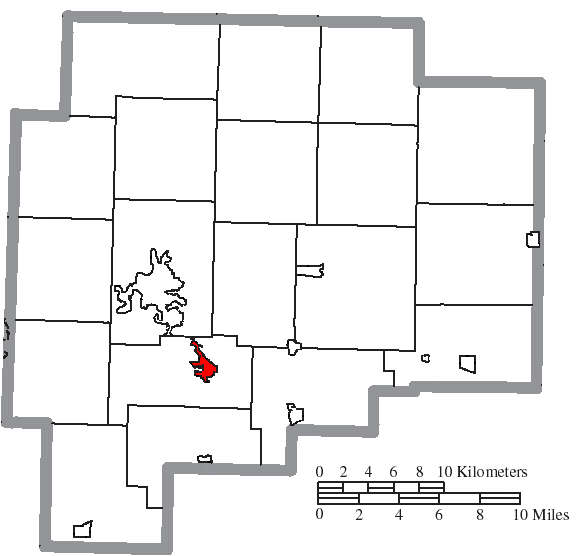
- Location of Byesville in Guernsey County
- Coordinates: 39°58′23″N 81°32′45″W
- Country: United States
- State: Ohio
- County: Guernsey
- Township: Jackson
- Incorporated: 1882
- Established: 1856

Government
  - Mayor: Jay Jackson
  - Founder: Jonathan Bye

Area
  - Total: 1.20 sq mi (3.12 km^{2})
  - Land: 1.20 sq mi (3.10 km^{2})
  - Water: 0.0077 sq mi (0.02 km^{2})
- Elevation: 804 ft (245 m)

Population (2020)
  - Total: 2,364
  - Estimate (2023): 2,341
  - Density: 1,972.9/sq mi (761.75/km^{2})
- Time zone: UTC-5 (Eastern (EST))
  - Summer (DST): UTC-4 (EDT)
- ZIP code: 43723
- Area code: 740
- FIPS code: 39-10716
- GNIS feature ID: 2397516
- Website: Village website

Byesville (/ˈbaɪzvɪl/ BYZE-vil) is a village in Guernsey County, Ohio, United States, along Wills Creek. The population was 2,364 at the 2020 census.

== History ==
Byesville was platted in 1856, and named for Jonathan Bye, the owner of a local mill. The village was incorporated in 1881.

== Geography ==
According to the United States Census Bureau, the village has a total area of 1.19 square miles (3.08 km^{2}), all land. Byesville is drained by Wills Creek.

The village is crossed by Interstate 77, Ohio State Route 209, Ohio State Route 821 and Interstate 70, about two miles north of the village.

== Demographics ==
Historical population
Census	Pop.	Note	%±
1850	35		—
1870	25		—
1890	789		—
1900	1,267		60.6%
1910	3,156		149.1%
1920	2,775		−12.1%
1930	2,638		−4.9%
1940	2,418		−8.3%
1950	2,236		−7.5%
1960	2,447		9.4%
1970	2,097		−14.3%
1980	2,572		22.7%
1990	2,435		−5.3%
2000	2,574		5.7%
2010	2,438		−5.3%
2020	2,364		−3.0%
2023 (est.)	2,341	▼	−1.0%
U.S. Decennial Census

=== 2010 census ===
As of the census of 2010, there were 2,438 people, 1,027 households, and 673 families living in the village. The population density was 2,048.7 inhabitants per square mile (791.0/km^{2}). There were 1,105 housing units at an average density of 928.6 per square mile (358.5/km^{2}). The racial makeup of the village was 98.2% White, 0.1% African American, 0.2% Native American, 0.2% Asian, and 1.2% from two or more races. Hispanic or Latino of any race were 0.2% of the population.

There were 1,027 households, of which 32.2% had children under the age of 18 living with them, 43.6% were married couples living together, 17.0% had a female householder with no husband present, 4.9% had a male householder with no wife present, and 34.5% were non-families. 31.3% of all households were made up of individuals, and 15% had someone living alone who was 65 years of age or older. The average household size was 2.37 and the average family size was 2.95.

The median age in the village was 39.2 years. 25.4% of residents were under the age of 18; 8.4% were between the ages of 18 and 24; 22.9% were from 25 to 44; 26.9% were from 45 to 64; and 16.2% were 65 years of age or older. The gender makeup of the village was 46.6% male and 53.4% female.

=== 2000 census ===
As of the census of 2000, there were 2,574 people, 1,064 households, and 706 families living in the village. The population density was 2,642.6 inhabitants per square mile (1,020.3/km^{2}). There were 1,139 housing units at an average density of 1,169.4 per square mile (451.5/km^{2}). The racial makeup of the village was 98.06% White, 0.19% African American, 0.43% Native American, 0.23% Asian, 0.04% Pacific Islander, and 1.05% from two or more races. Hispanic or Latino of any race were 0.66% of the population.

There were 1,064 households, out of which 33.0% had children under the age of 18 living with them, 46.3% were married couples living together, 15.7% had a female householder with no husband present, and 33.6% were non-families. 29.6% of all households were made up of individuals, and 12.9% had someone living alone who was 65 years of age or older. The average household size was 2.42 and the average family size was 3.01.

In the village, the population was spread out, with 27.4% under the age of 18, 9.1% from 18 to 24, 26.8% from 25 to 44, 22.6% from 45 to 64, and 14.1% who were 65 years of age or older. The median age was 36 years. For every 100 females there were 85.7 males. For every 100 females age 18 and over, there were 84.0 males.

The median income for a household in the village was $28,136, and the median income for a family was $35,690. Males had a median income of $29,673 versus $18,346 for females. The per capita income for the village was $13,270. About 10.9% of families and 15.2% of the population were below the poverty line, including 14.7% of those under age 18 and 18.5% of those age 65 or over.

== Economy ==
Plastech operated a manufacturing plant in Byesville until late June 2008.

== Education ==
Byesville is within the Rolling Hills School District. Students attend Meadowbrook High School. Byesville has a public library, a branch of the Guernsey County Public Library.

== Notable people ==
- Dom Capers, NFL defensive coordinator and head coach
- Herbert F. Christian, soldier, Awarded the Congressional Medal of Honor
- Dzvinia Orlowsky, poet, translator, editor and professor

== See also ==
- Columbus and Ohio River Railroad
