= Cambridge, Ohio =

- City
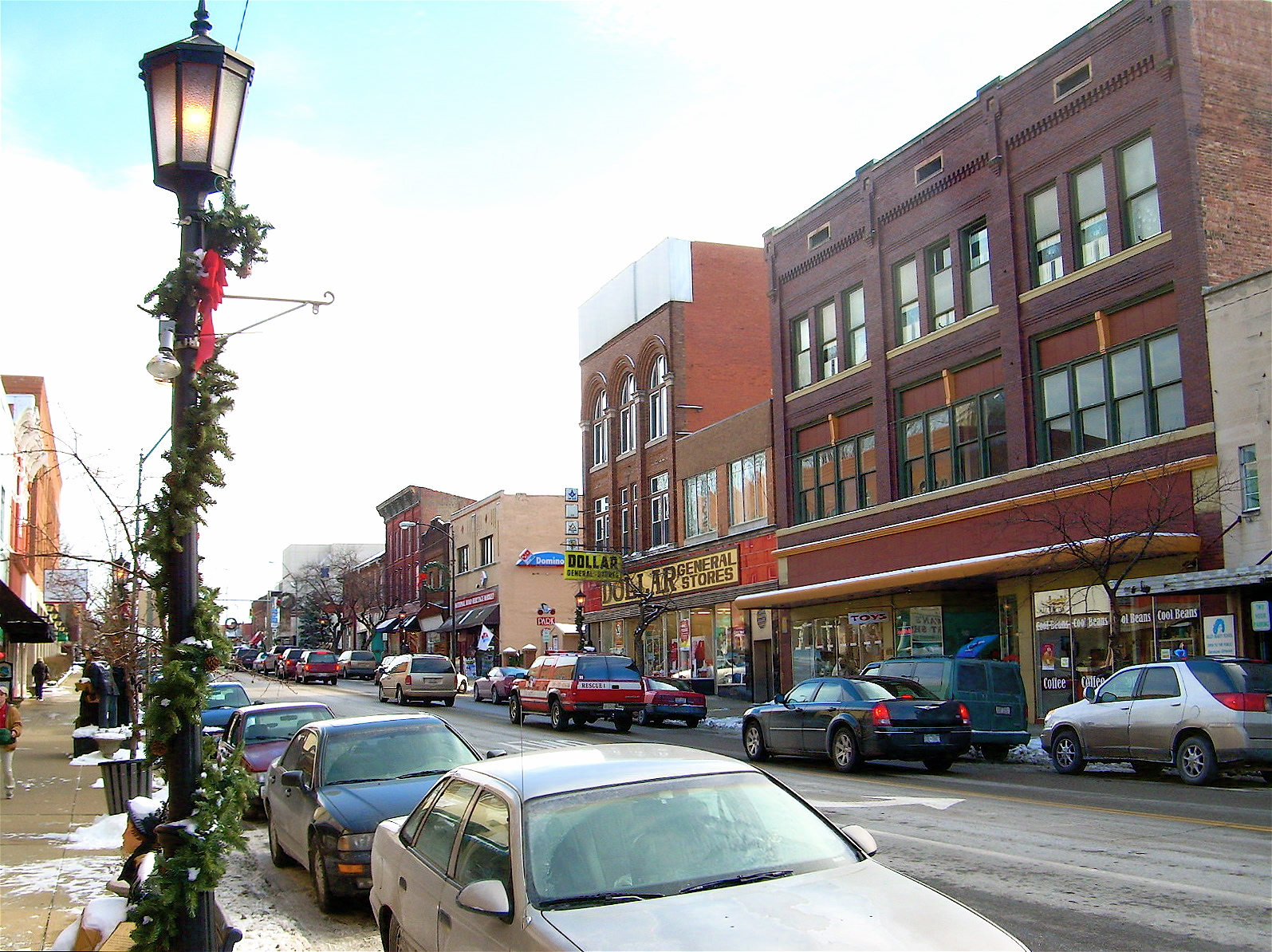
- Downtown Cambridge in 2008
- Interactive map of Cambridge, Ohio
- Location within Ohio Location within the United States
- Coordinates: 40°01′20″N 81°35′12″W
- Country: United States
- State: Ohio
- County: Guernsey
- First Settled: 1798
- Incorporated: 1837

Government
  - Mayor: Tom Orr

Area
  - Total: 6.37 sq mi (16.50 km^{2})
  - Land: 6.37 sq mi (16.49 km^{2})
  - Water: 0.0039 sq mi (0.01 km^{2})
- Elevation: 846 ft (258 m)

Population (2020)
  - Total: 10,089
  - Estimate (2023): 9,969
  - Density: 1,584.4/sq mi (611.73/km^{2})
- Time zone: UTC-5 (Eastern (EST))
  - Summer (DST): UTC-4 (EDT)
- ZIP codes: 43725, 43750
- Area code: 740
- FIPS code: 39-10996
- GNIS feature ID: 2393504
- Website: City of Cambridge

Cambridge (/ˈkeɪmbrɪdʒ/ KAYM-brij) is a city in Guernsey County, Ohio, United States, and its county seat. The population was 10,089 at the 2020 census. It lies in the Appalachian Plateau of the Appalachian Mountains in southeastern Ohio. It is the principal city of the Cambridge micropolitan area and is located adjacent to the intersection of Interstates 70 and 77.

Cambridge is well known among glass collectors as being the location for the Cambridge Glass, Boyd Glass and Mosser Glass plants. The Cambridge area is also noted for its S-shaped bridges, dating back to the building of the National Road in 1828.

== History ==
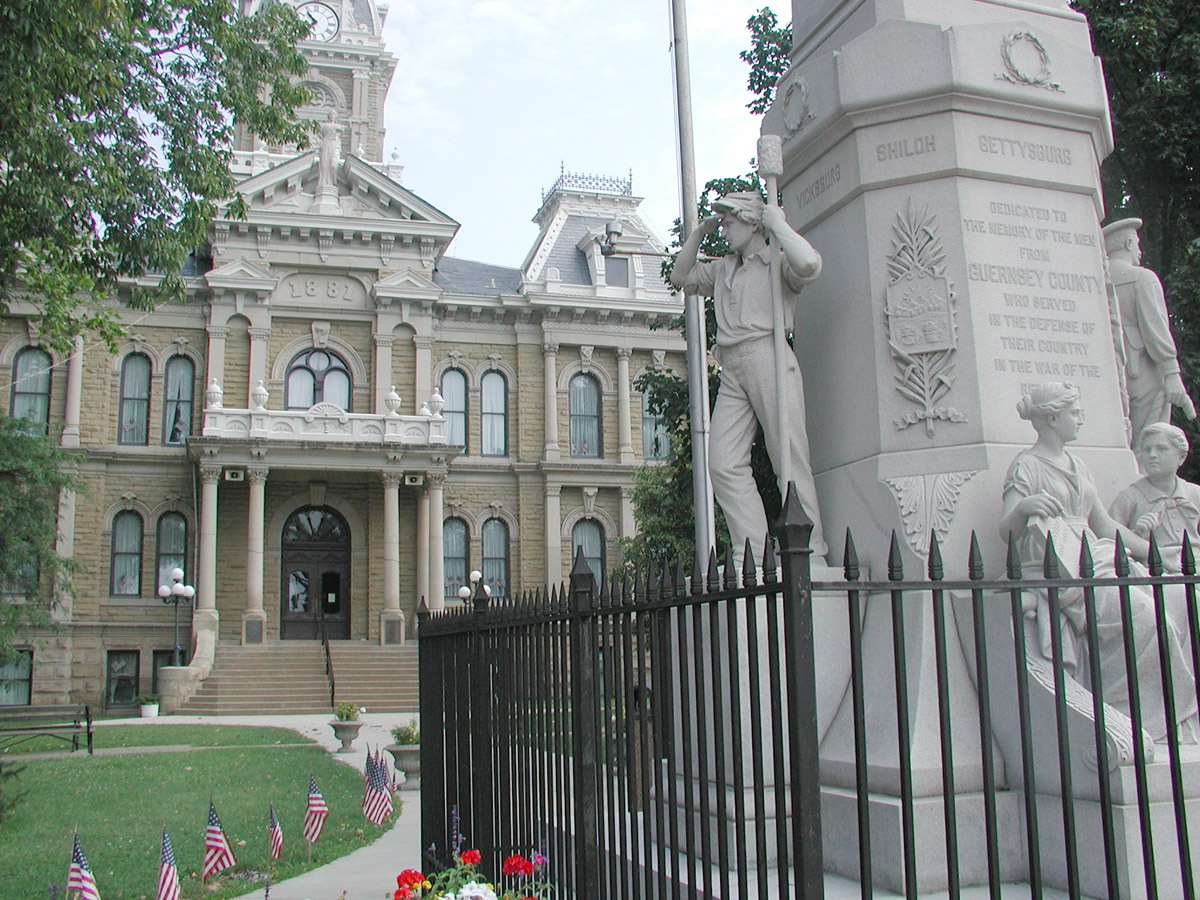
Guernsey County Courthouse

In 1796, Col. Ebenezer Zane received funds to blaze a road suitable for travel by horse through the Ohio wilderness from a point on the Ohio River opposite Wheeling, Virginia (now Wheeling, West Virginia) to another point opposite Maysville, Kentucky. Where this road, known as Zane's Trace, crossed Wills Creek, a ferry was established in 1798. This was followed by the first bridge authorized by the legislature of the Northwest Territory, built in 1803. The land on which part of Cambridge stands was granted to Zaccheus Biggs and Zaccheus Beatty by the government in 1801. A settlement grew up at the creek crossing. The town of Cambridge was platted there in 1806. Both Cambridge, Maryland and Cambridge, Massachusetts have been speculated by historians as having inspired the naming of the town. Also in 1806, another group of early settlers from the Isle of Guernsey in the English Channel pitched camp in Cambridge, reportedly because the women in the party refused to move on. The county for which Cambridge serves as the county seat was later named in honor of its many settlers from Guernsey. In 1828, the federally built National Road came through Cambridge. The first railroad arrived in 1854. The Cambridge area experienced massive flooding in late June 1998.

== Geography ==
Cambridge is located along Wills Creek; its tributary Leatherwood Creek flows into Wills Creek in the southern part of the city.

According to the United States Census Bureau, the city has a total area of 6.35 square miles (16.45 km^{2}), all land.

=== Climate ===
Climate data for Cambridge, Ohio (1991–2020 normals, extremes 1963–present)
Month	Jan	Feb	Mar	Apr	May	Jun	Jul	Aug	Sep	Oct	Nov	Dec	Year
Record high °F (°C)	74 (23)	79 (26)	85 (29)	92 (33)	97 (36)	99 (37)	102 (39)	99 (37)	96 (36)	92 (33)	80 (27)	77 (25)	102 (39)
Mean daily maximum °F (°C)	38.2 (3.4)	42.3 (5.7)	52.8 (11.6)	66.2 (19.0)	75.0 (23.9)	82.0 (27.8)	85.1 (29.5)	84.0 (28.9)	77.8 (25.4)	66.1 (18.9)	53.2 (11.8)	42.4 (5.8)	63.8 (17.7)
Daily mean °F (°C)	29.4 (−1.4)	32.4 (0.2)	41.6 (5.3)	53.2 (11.8)	62.6 (17.0)	70.3 (21.3)	73.9 (23.3)	72.5 (22.5)	65.7 (18.7)	54.1 (12.3)	42.9 (6.1)	34.0 (1.1)	52.7 (11.5)
Mean daily minimum °F (°C)	20.7 (−6.3)	22.6 (−5.2)	30.3 (−0.9)	40.2 (4.6)	50.2 (10.1)	58.5 (14.7)	62.7 (17.1)	60.9 (16.1)	53.7 (12.1)	42.2 (5.7)	32.6 (0.3)	25.7 (−3.5)	41.7 (5.4)
Record low °F (°C)	−32 (−36)	−16 (−27)	−3 (−19)	8 (−13)	23 (−5)	30 (−1)	42 (6)	37 (3)	32 (0)	18 (−8)	0 (−18)	−17 (−27)	−32 (−36)
Average precipitation inches (mm)	3.25 (83)	2.41 (61)	3.27 (83)	3.84 (98)	4.23 (107)	4.46 (113)	4.04 (103)	3.49 (89)	3.47 (88)	2.87 (73)	3.00 (76)	2.99 (76)	41.32 (1,050)
Average snowfall inches (cm)	5.5 (14)	5.3 (13)	3.1 (7.9)	0.0 (0.0)	0.0 (0.0)	0.0 (0.0)	0.0 (0.0)	0.0 (0.0)	0.0 (0.0)	0.0 (0.0)	0.5 (1.3)	3.0 (7.6)	17.4 (44)
Average precipitation days (≥ 0.01 in)	13.4	11.1	11.7	12.9	13.1	12.4	10.9	9.0	9.1	9.9	10.1	12.0	135.6
Average snowy days (≥ 0.1 in)	4.1	2.8	1.5	0.0	0.0	0.0	0.0	0.0	0.0	0.0	0.4	2.2	11.0
Source: NOAA

== Demographics ==
Historical population
Census	Pop.	Note	%±
1840	766		—
1850	1,041		35.9%
1860	1,452		39.5%
1870	2,193		51.0%
1880	2,883		31.5%
1890	4,361		51.3%
1900	8,241		89.0%
1910	11,327		37.4%
1920	13,104		15.7%
1930	16,129		23.1%
1940	15,044		−6.7%
1950	14,739		−2.0%
1960	14,652		−0.6%
1970	13,656		−6.8%
1980	13,450		−1.5%
1990	11,748		−12.7%
2000	11,520		−1.9%
2010	10,635		−7.7%
2020	10,089		−5.1%
2025 (est.)	10,055		−0.3%
U.S. Decennial Census

=== 2020 census ===
As of the 2020 census, Cambridge had a population of 10,089. The population density was 1,584.3 inhabitants per square mile (611.7/km^{2}). There were 5,267 housing units at an average density of 717.11 per square mile (276.9/km^{2}). The median age was 39.9 years. 22.2% of residents were under the age of 18, 8.6% were between the ages of 18 and 24, 24.8% were from 25 to 44, 24.3% were from 45 to 64, and 20.1% were 65 years of age or older. For every 100 females there were 88.9 males, and for every 100 females age 18 and over there were 85.8 males age 18 and over.

98.7% of residents lived in urban areas, while 1.3% lived in rural areas.

There were 4,568 households in Cambridge, of which 26.0% had children under the age of 18 living in them. Of all households, 29.6% were married-couple households, 22.0% were households with a male householder and no spouse or partner present, and 38.6% were households with a female householder and no spouse or partner present. About 40.8% of all households were made up of individuals and 18.6% had someone living alone who was 65 years of age or older. The average household size was 2.21 and the average family size was 3.48. Among occupied housing units, 47.3% were owner-occupied and 52.7% were renter-occupied. The homeowner vacancy rate was 4.1% and the rental vacancy rate was 12.9%.

Racial composition as of the 2020 census
Race	Number	Percent
White	9,025	89.5%
Black or African American	375	3.7%
American Indian and Alaska Native	49	0.5%
Asian	39	0.4%
Native Hawaiian and Other Pacific Islander	5	<0.1%
Some other race	62	0.6%
Two or more races	534	5.3%
Hispanic or Latino (of any race)	160	1.6%

=== 2010 census ===
As of the census of 2010, there were 10,635 people, 4,651 households, and 2,604 families living in the city. The population density was 1,674.8 inhabitants per square mile (646.6/km^{2}). There were 5,313 housing units at an average density of 836.7 per square mile (323.1/km^{2}). The racial makeup of the city was 92.7% White, 3.4% African American, 0.3% Native American, 0.3% Asian, 0.3% from other races, and 3.0% from two or more races. Hispanic or Latino of any race were 1.2% of the population.

There were 4,651 households, of which 30.3% had children under the age of 18 living with them, 33.9% were married couples living together, 16.9% had a female householder with no husband present, 14.8% had a male householder with no wife present, and 44.0% were non-families. 38.2% of all households were made up of individuals, and 17% had someone living alone who was 65 years of age or older. The average household size was 2.23 and the average family size was 2.94.

The median age in the city was 38.8 years. 24.6% of residents were under the age of 18; 8.7% were between the ages of 18 and 24; 24.6% were from 25 to 44; 24.8% were from 45 to 64; and 17.3% were 65 years of age or older. The gender makeup of the city was 46.6% male and 53.4% female.

=== 2000 census ===
As of the census of 2000, there were 11,520 people, 4,924 households, and 2,954 families living in the city. The population density was 2,055.1 inhabitants per square mile (793.5/km^{2}). There were 5,585 housing units of an average density of 996.3 per square mile (384.7/km^{2}). The racial makeup of the city was 92.84% White, 3.91% African American, 0.33% Native American, 0.37% Asian, 0.47% from other races, and 2.07% from two or more races. Hispanic or Latino of any race were 0.96% of the population.

There were 4,924 households, out of which 30.5% had children under the age of 18, 39.2% were married couples living together, 16.3% had a female householder with no husband present, and 40.0% were non-families. 35.3% of all households were made up of individuals, and 15.9% had someone living alone who was 65 years of age or older. The average household size was 2.28 and the average family size was 2.92.

The population of the city was spread out, with 25.9% under the age of 18, 9.2% from 18 to 24, 26.5% from 25 to 44, 20.9% from 45 to 64, and 17.5% who were 65 years of age or older. The median age was 36 years. For every 100 females, there were 85.8 males and every 100 females aged 18 and over, there were 79.9 males.

The median income for a household in the city was $24,102, and the median income for a family was $30,780. Males had a median income of $26,368 versus $20,596 for females. The per capita income for the city was $14,452. About 18.1% of families and 30.2% of the population were below the poverty line, including 29.5% of those under age 18 and 12.2% of those age 65 or over.

== Education ==
The Cambridge City School District administers one primary school (K–2), one intermediate school (3–5), one middle school and Cambridge High School. St. Benedict Elementary School is a Roman Catholic institution.

The Guernsey County Public Library operates two libraries in the city.

== Infrastructure ==
=== Transportation ===
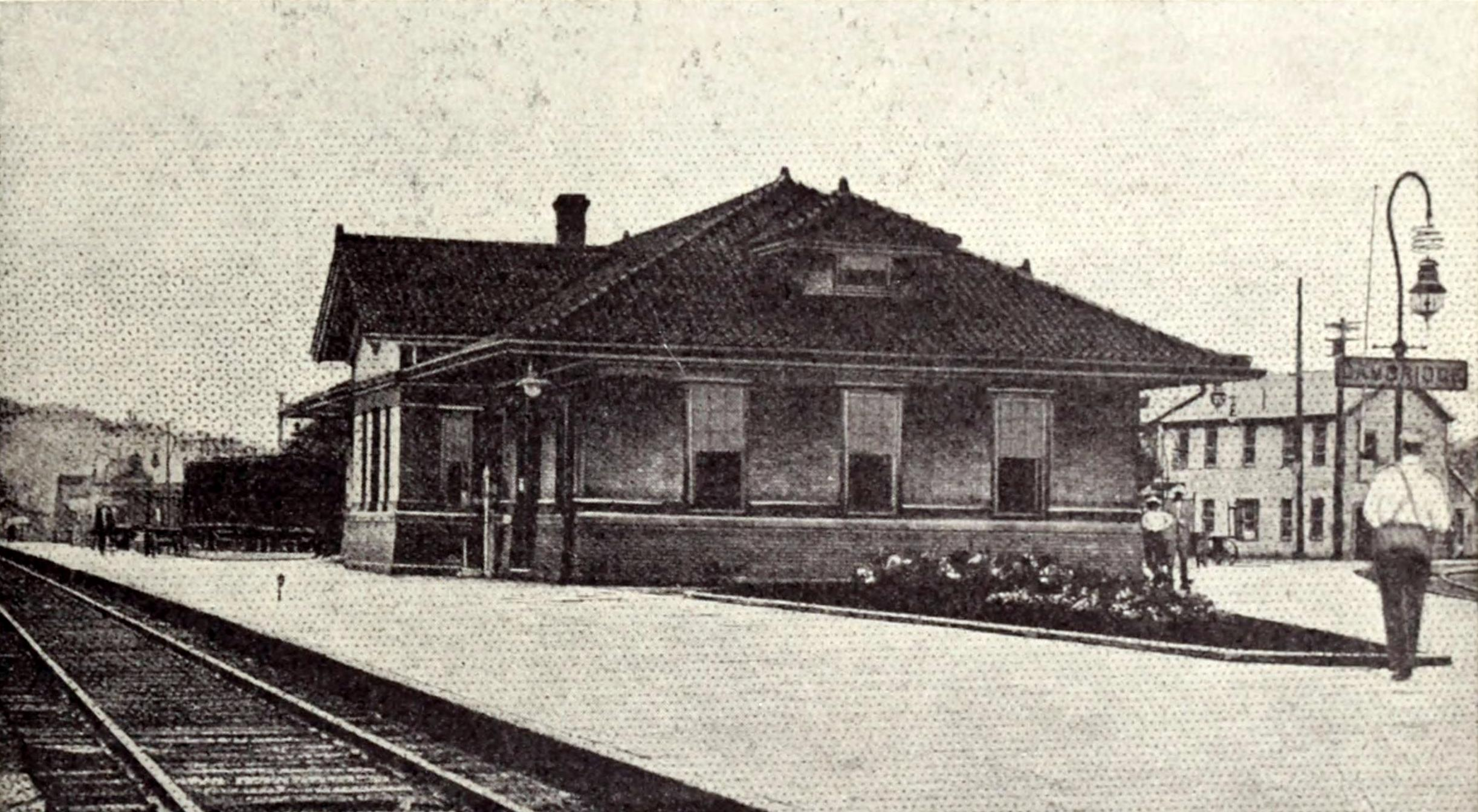
Union Station, Cambridge, Ohio, c. 1914

Cambridge is the site of a major junction between Interstate 70 and Interstate 77; both routes have exits connecting to Cambridge's city center. The city is additionally bisected by U.S. Route 22/U.S. Route 40 acting as the de facto "main street", and is not too far away from Cambridge Municipal Airport, primarily used for general aviation. The closest commercial airport is Mid-Ohio Valley Regional Airport, but the airport only serves Contour Airlines and flies regionally; the closest commercial airport with cross-country service is John Glenn Columbus International Airport.

== Notable people ==
- Daphne Alloway McVicker, writer
- William Lawrence Boyd, actor who portrayed western character Hopalong Cassidy in 66 films, lived on Gomber Avenue
- Dom Capers, defensive coordinator for NFL's Green Bay Packers; former defensive coordinator for Miami Dolphins and Pittsburgh Steelers, also first head coach of Houston Texans and of Carolina Panthers
- Doug Donley, former wide receiver for Dallas Cowboys and Chicago Bears
- Tom Eyen, experimental playwright, lyricist, and theatre director, author of Dreamgirls for which he won 1981 Tony Award for Best Book of a Musical
- Geno Ford, former Ohio Mr. Basketball and Ohio University player and coach; head coach at Kent State and Bradley
- John Glenn, United States Senator, chairman of the Senate Committee on Governmental Affairs, NASA astronaut, NASA payload specialist, United States Navy and Marine Corps colonel, World War II and Korean War veteran, first American to orbit Earth in his Mercury-Atlas 6 mission
- Lisa Howard, film and television actress and journalist
- Bill Kenworthy, Major League Baseball player from 1912-1917
- Orville Singer, Negro league baseball player from 1923-1932
- William Oxley Thompson, fifth president of Ohio State University
