= S bridge (disambiguation) =

An S bridge is a bridge whose alignment follows a reverse curve, like the letter "S" in plan.

S Bridge may also refer to:

- Claysville S Bridge, historic bridge on the National Road in Washington County, Pennsylvania
- S Bridge (Womelsdorf, Pennsylvania), former historic bridge in Womesldorf, Pennsylvania
- S Bridge II, historic bridge on the National Road near New Concord, Ohio
- S Bridge, National Road, historic bridge on the National Road near Old Washington, Ohio
- Soo Line Railroad Bridge, historic railroad bridge in Eau Claire, Wisconsin
