= S bridge =

Rare type of overpass design

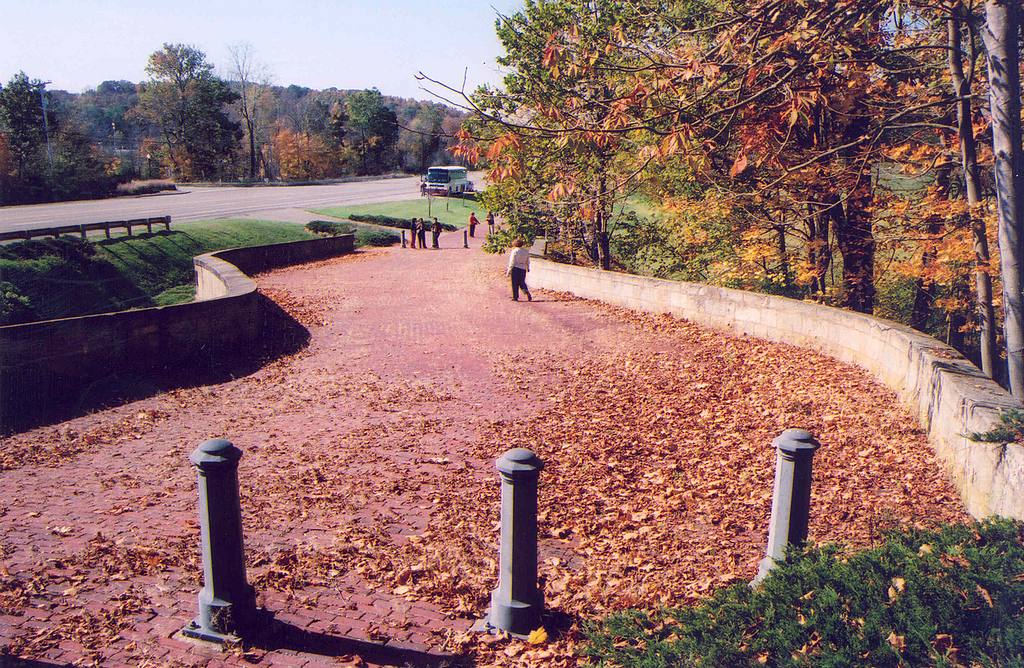
The Fox Run S bridge in New Concord, Ohio.

An S bridge is a bridge whose alignment follows a reverse curve, shaped roughly like a shallow letter S in plan, used in early 19th-century road construction in the United States. They were generally used for crossing small, curving streams with uneven banks. Several of these bridges are found in and around the New Concord, Ohio, area.

== History ==
S bridges were originally constructed early in the 19th century. The design was adopted where the road crossed the creek or river at an angle. Constructing a bridge at an angle was much more complicated and expensive than building the bridge perpendicular to the water flow and banks. The bridges were constructed at 90 degrees to the bank, while two 'aprons' were constructed at opposite angles to direct the traffic flow smoothly onto the bridge, thus creating the 's' shape.

Only a few of these bridges still exist, mostly in Ohio. Four of them are located in Guernsey County. Fox Run S bridge is located along U.S. Route 40 in New Concord in Muskingum County. The next bridge, 4.5 miles (7.2 km) east of New Concord on U.S. Route 40, is found at the intersection of US 40 and Peter's Creek Road. Continuing eastward, the next bridge is a short distance from US 40 on Manilla Road. The next "S" bridge is 1.5 miles (2.4 km) east of Cambridge along US 40 at its intersection with Old National Road and has fallen into considerable disrepair. The fourth bridge is located between Old Washington, Ohio and Middlebourne, Ohio along Blend Road, at the intersection of Bridgewater Road, and has been designated a National Historic Landmark. This bridge was closed on 2 October 2013 and no S bridges are still in use for vehicular traffic in Ohio.

These four bridges were constructed as a part of the original National Road, which was built circa 1825.

The S Bridge in Berks County, Pennsylvania, and the Claysville S Bridge in Washington County, Pennsylvania, are listed on the National Register of Historic Places. Another S bridge, in Anderson County, Kentucky, is located on U.S. Route 62 east of Lawrenceburg. It has undergone major roadway replacement and has been widened.

Another S bridge of note is located in Hertford, North Carolina. It connects a causeway from Winfall to the town of Hertford, over the Perquimans River.

The Linn Cove Viaduct on the Blue Ridge Parkway in modern example that snakes around Grandfather Mountain in North Carolina.

The Dublin Link pedestrian suspension S bridge was opened in Dublin, Ohio, on 17 March 2020.

== Gallery ==
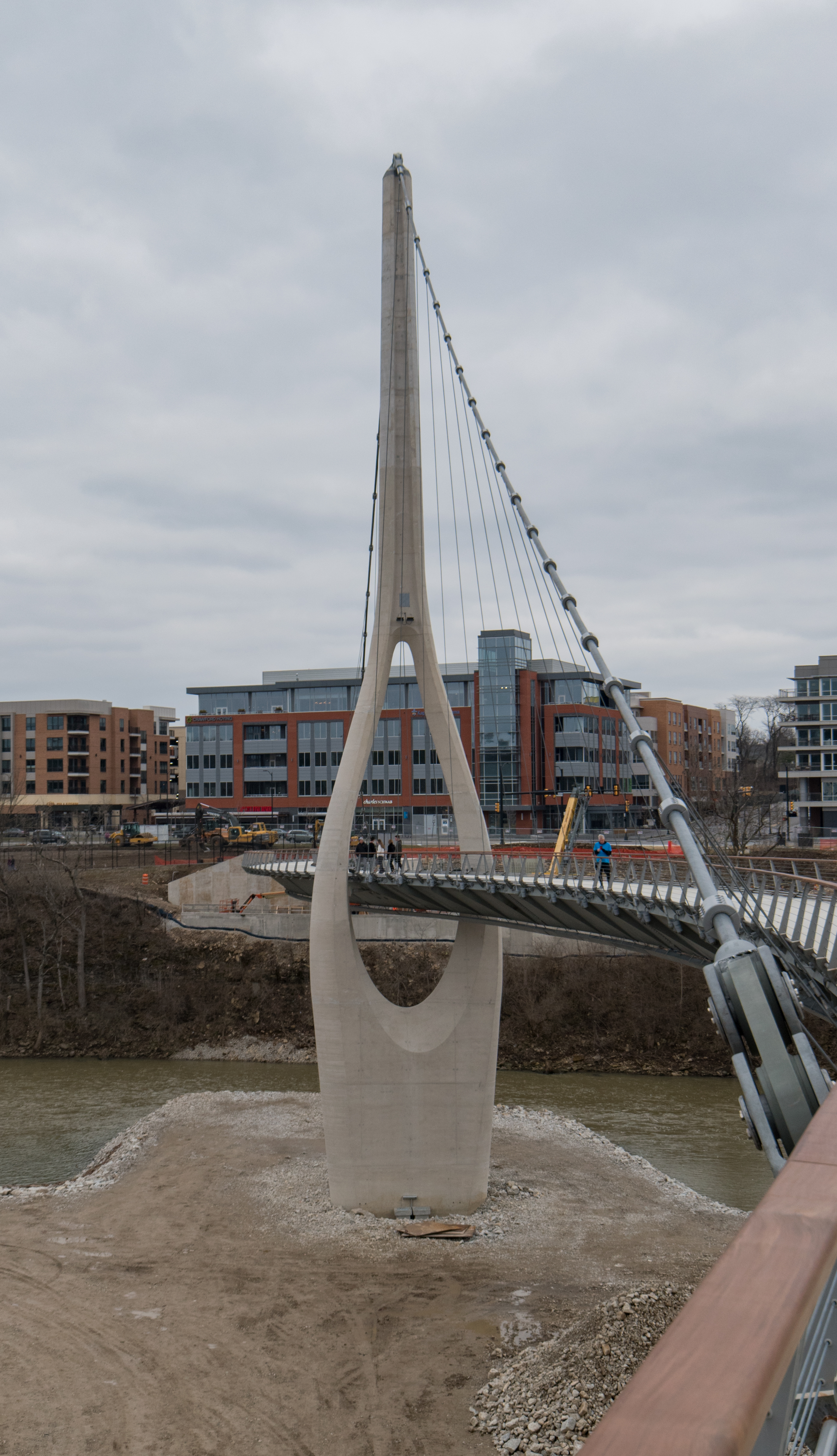
Dublin Link

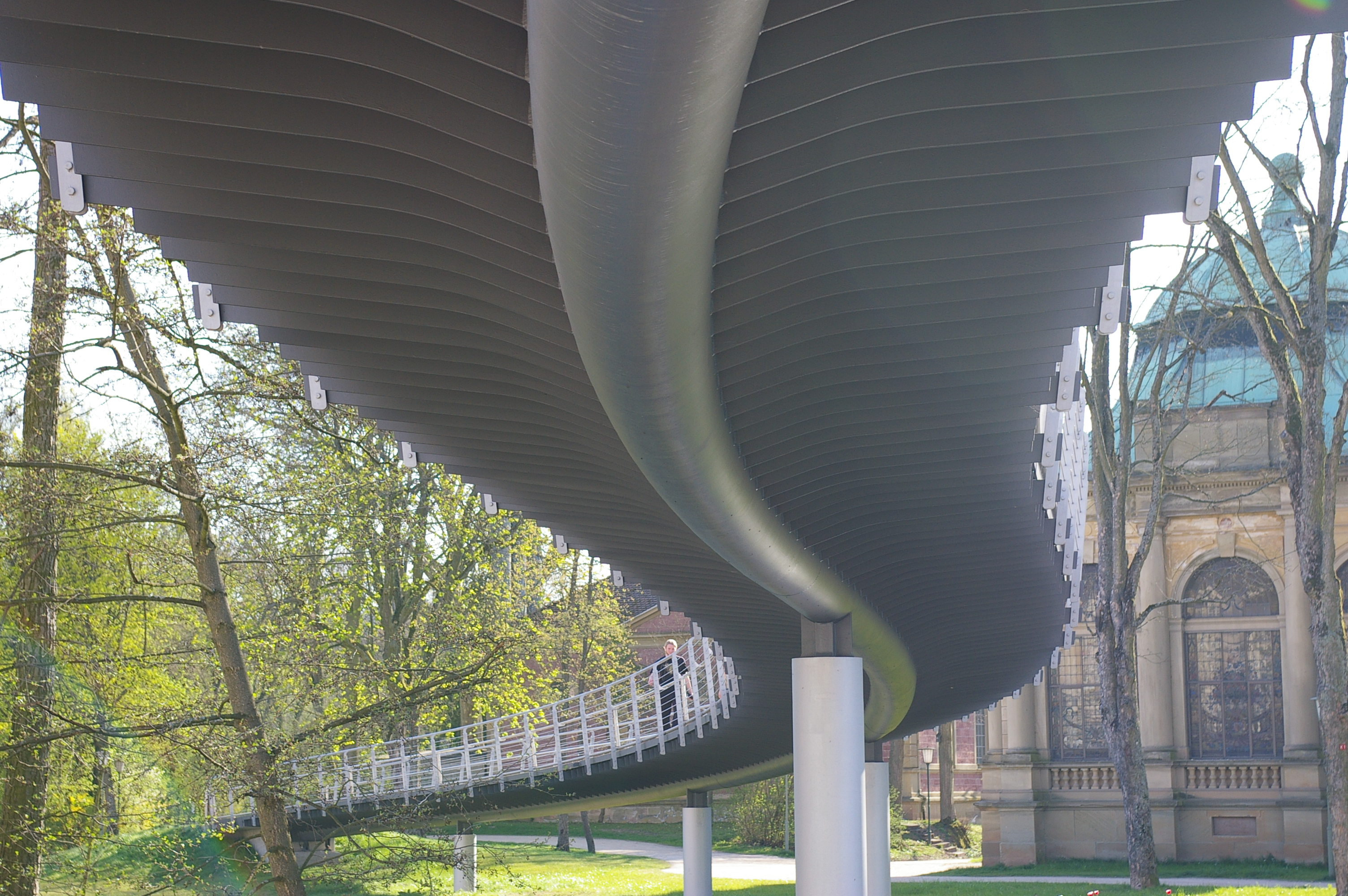
Luitpoldparksteg

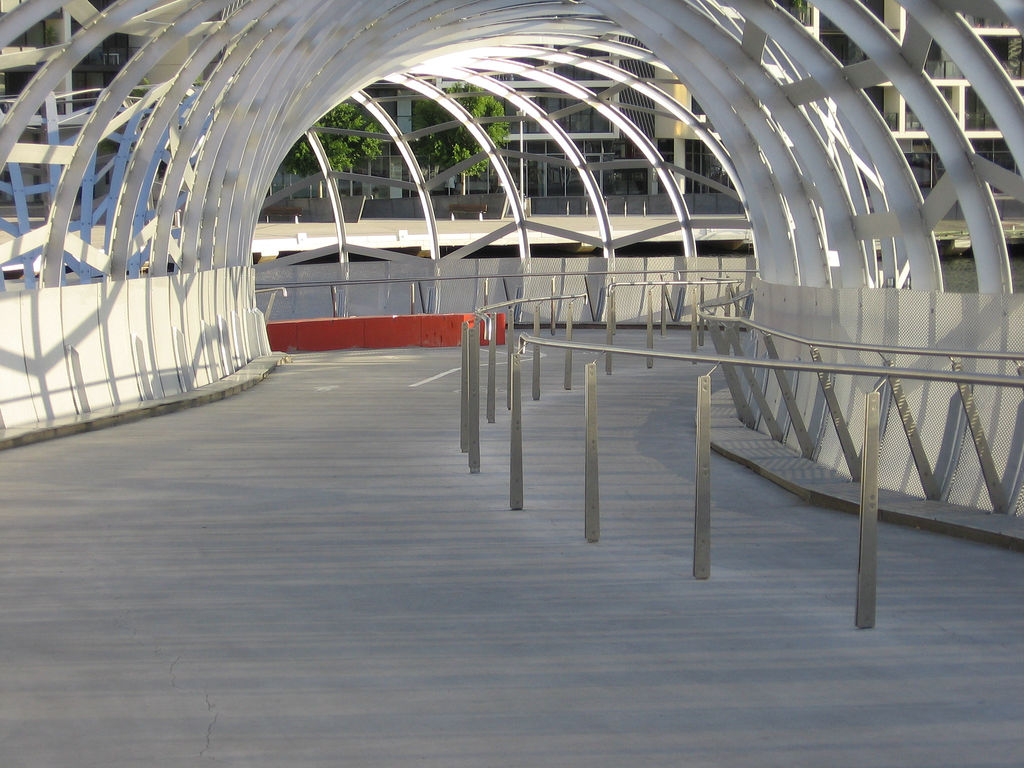
Webb Bridge

== See also ==
- Three-way bridge (Y-bridge)
