= Arthur Gill =

Arthur Gill may refer to:

- Eric Gill (Arthur Eric Rowton Gill, 1882–1940), English sculptor, typeface designer, stonecutter and printmaker
- Arthur B. Gill (1876–1965), American football coach, orthopedic surgeon and college professor
