= C. Ellis Moore =

American politician (1884–1941)

Charles E. Moore
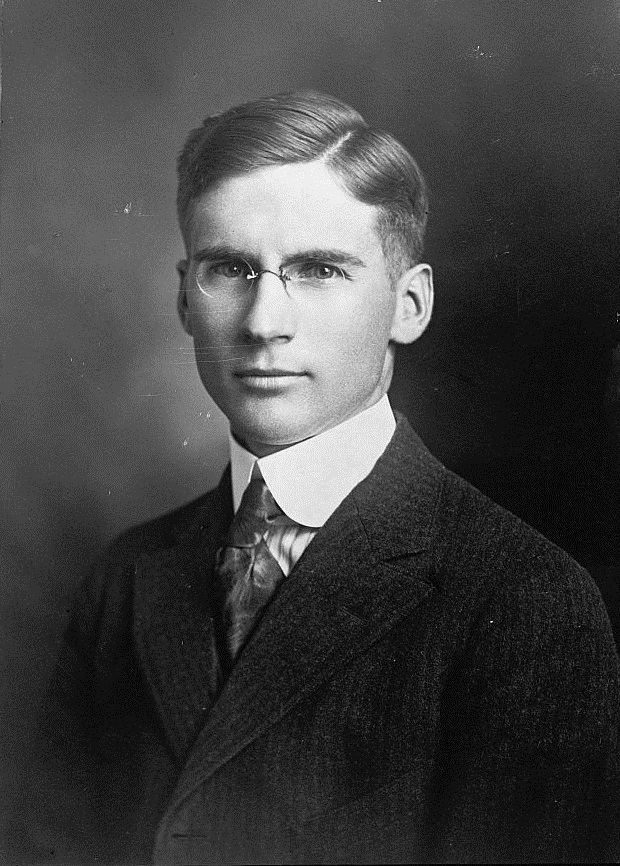
- in 1923

Member of the U.S. House of Representatives from Ohio's 15th district
- In office March 4, 1919 – March 3, 1933
- Preceded by: George White
- Succeeded by: Robert T. Secrest

Personal details
- Born: Charles Ellis Moore; January 3, 1884 Middlebourne, Ohio
- Died: April 2, 1941 (aged 57) Cambridge, Ohio
- Resting place: Northwood Cemetery
- Party: Republican
- Education: Mount Union College; Muskingum College; College of Law, Ohio State University

Charles Ellis Moore (January 3, 1884 – April 2, 1941) was an American lawyer and politician who served seven terms as a U.S. representative from Ohio from 1919 to 1933.

== Biography ==
Born near Middlebourne, Ohio, Moore attended the common schools and Mount Union College, Alliance, Ohio. He taught school in Oxford Township, Ohio.

=== Education ===
He graduated from Muskingum College, New Concord, Ohio, in 1907 and from the College of Law at Ohio State University, Columbus, Ohio, in 1910. He was admitted to the bar in 1910.

Moore began his career as an attorney in Cambridge, Ohio. He also served as prosecuting attorney of Guernsey County from 1914 to 1918.

=== Congress ===
Moore was elected as a Republican to the Sixty-sixth and to the six succeeding Congresses (March 4, 1919 – March 3, 1933). He was one of the House managers appointed by the House of Representatives in 1926 to conduct the impeachment trial proceedings against George W. English, judge of the United States District Court for the Eastern District of Illinois.

He was an unsuccessful candidate for reelection in 1932 to the Seventy-third Congress. He resumed the practice of law in Cambridge, Ohio, and also engaged in the banking business.

=== Death and burial ===
Moore died in Cambridge on April 2, 1941. He was interred in Northwood Cemetery.

== Sources ==
- United States Congress. "C. Ellis Moore (id: M000894)". Biographical Directory of the United States Congress.

U.S. House of Representatives
Preceded by George White	Member of the U.S. House of Representatives from Ohio's 15th congressional district 1919–1933	Succeeded by Robert T. Secrest
