= Arthur B. Gill =

American football coach and orthopedic surgeon

Biographical details
- Born: December 12, 1876; Greensburg, Pennsylvania, U.S.
- Died: November 7, 1965 (aged 88); Asheville, North Carolina, U.S.
- Education: Pennsylvania Medical (1905)

Coaching career (HC unless noted)
- 1895–1896: Muskingum

Head coaching record
- Overall: 3–1

Arthur Bruce Gill (December 12, 1876 – November 7, 1965) was an American college football coach, orthopedic surgeon and college professor. He served as the head football coach at Muskingum College—now known as Muskingum University—in New Concord, Ohio from 1895 to 1896, compiling a record of 3–1. Gill received his medical degree from the University of Pennsylvania in 1905 where he remained a professor of orthopedic surgery until 1942.

== Head coaching record ==
| Year | Team | Overall | Conference | Standing | Bowl/playoffs |
|---|---|---|---|---|---|
Muskingum Fighting Muskies (Independent) (1895–1896)
| 1895 | Muskingum | 1–0 | | | |
| 1896 | Muskingum | 2–1 | | | |
| Muskingum: | | 3–1 | | | |
| Total: | | 3–1 | | | |
