= William Rainey Harper Log House =

Historic house in Ohio, United States

- Harper, William Rainey, Log House
- U.S. National Register of Historic Places
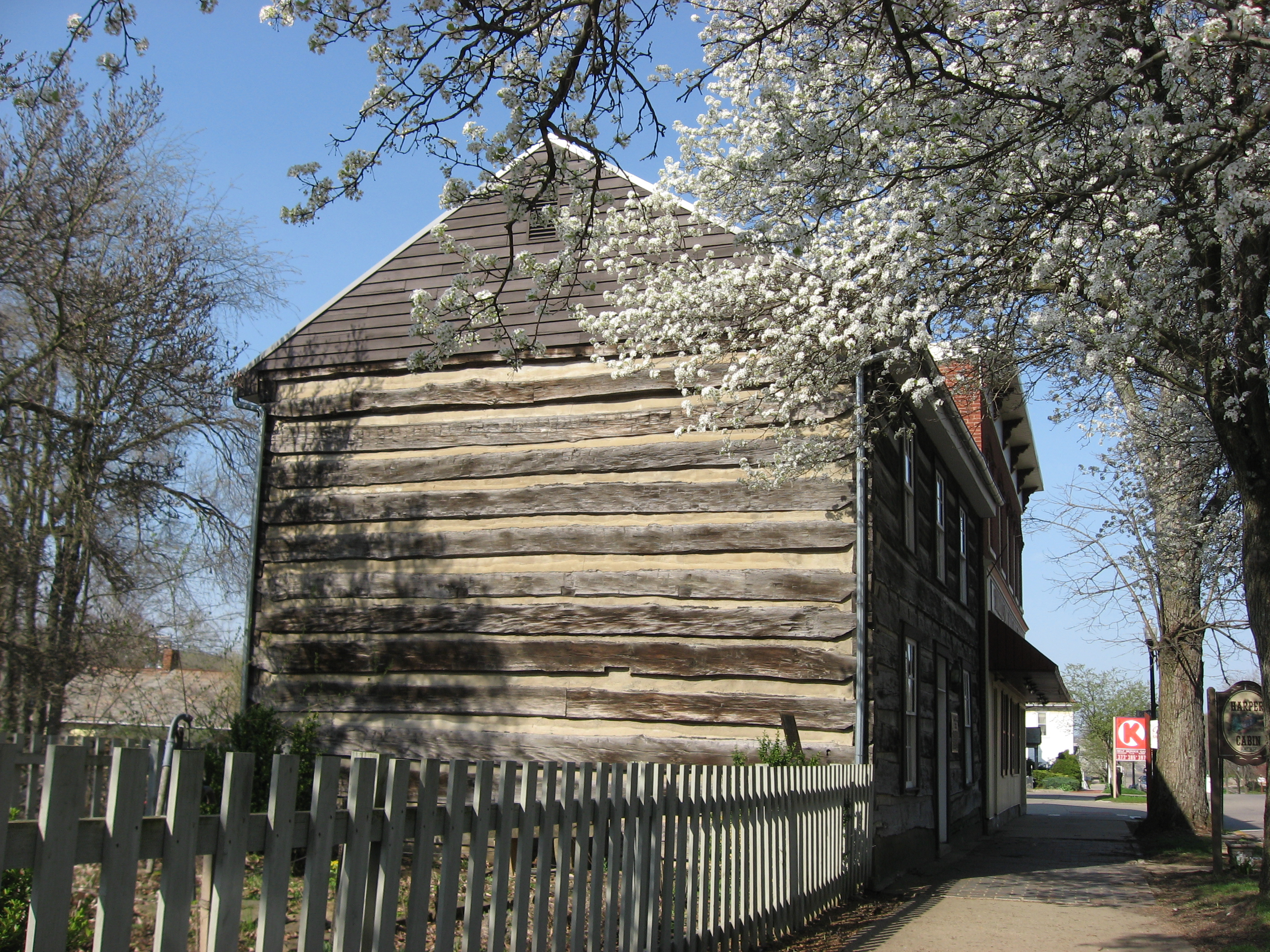
- The Harper Cabin

- Location within Ohio Location within the United States
- Location: E. Main St., New Concord, Ohio
- Coordinates: 39°59′38″N 81°44′5″W
- Area: less than one acre
- Built: 1825
- Architect: Samuel Harper
- NRHP reference No.: 78002154
- Added to NRHP: April 6, 1978

The William Rainey Harper Log House, also known as the Harper Cabin, is located at 20 West Main Street in New Concord, Ohio, United States. The home was placed on the National Register of Historic Places on 1980-01-03.

== History ==
The log house was built in 1834 by Archibold Boal for Joseph McKinney. The structure has remained much intact over the years and closely resembles the original plan. The house passed to Henry McCleary in 1843 and William Rainey Harper was born in the cabin in 1856. William remained in the house while he attended Muskingum College until he graduated at the age of 13 in 1869. Although William left for Yale in 1872, the house remained in the Harper family until it was sold in 1904.

The house was purchased by Muskingum College in 1918 and would remain so until 1987, and saw a photography studio as well as a classroom during that time. The cabin was renovated and restored in 1937 and was presented in 1987 to the city of New Concord. The house is used as a museum and operated by volunteers from the village.

Tours of the house can be arranged through the John and Annie Glenn Historic Site.

== Exterior ==
The two-story house is constructed of local hewn logs and designed in the Federal style. The central door is surrounded by a window to each side with three windows in line on the second floor. The gabled roof rests on a simple entablature with a chimney situated at either side of the house. The house is located next to a more recent building to the right and an herb garden is fenced off to the left.
