= Dublin Link =

Pedestrian bridge in Dublin, Ohio

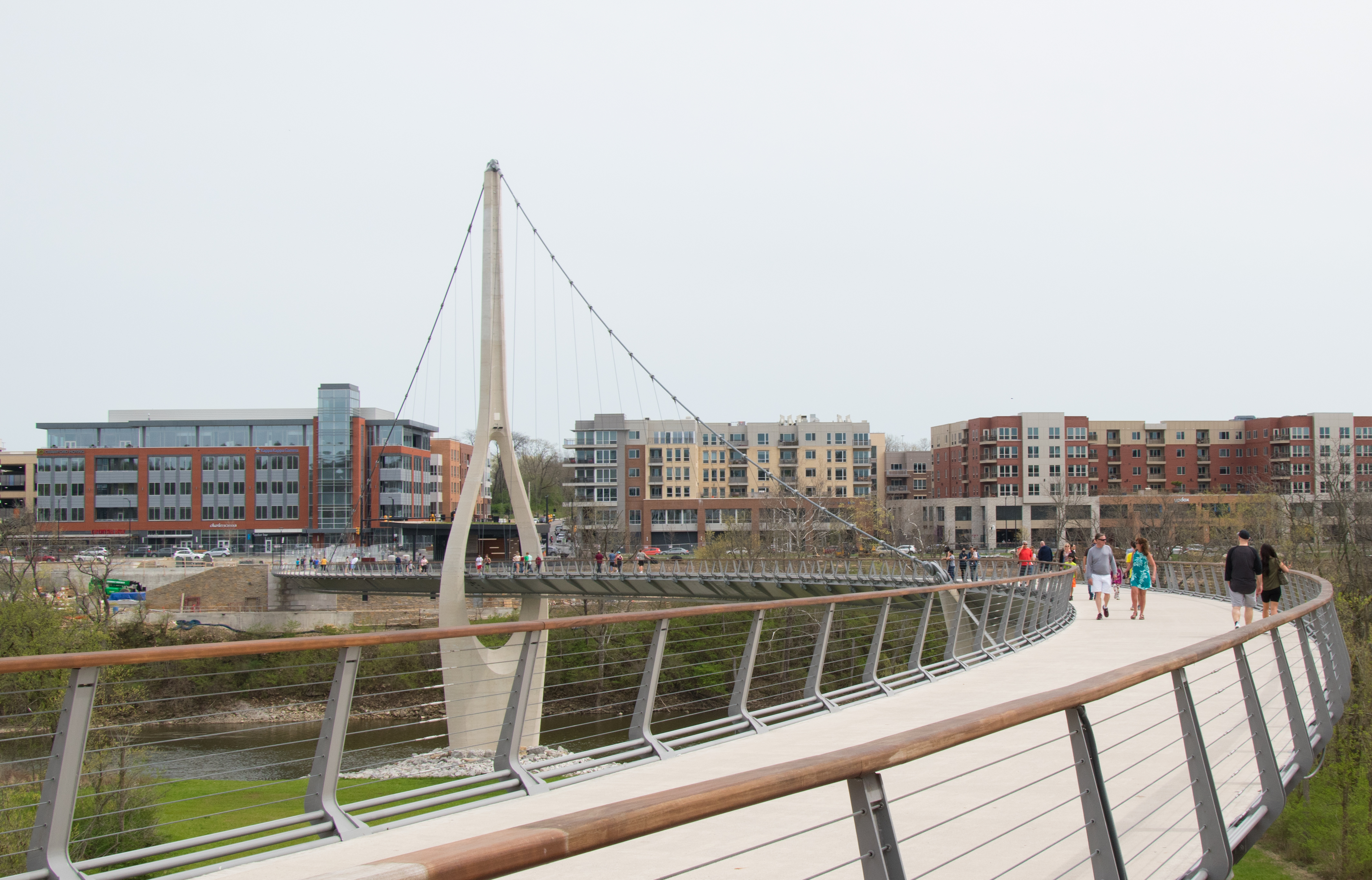
- Coordinates: 40°06′08″N 83°06′42″W
- Carries: Pedestrians, cyclists
- Crosses: Scioto River
- Locale: Dublin, Ohio
- Owner: City of Dublin

Characteristics
- Design: Suspension bridge
- Material: Steel and concrete
- Total length: 760 ft (232 m)
- Width: 14 ft (4 m)
- Height: 169 ft (52 m)
- Longest span: 500 ft (152 m)

History
- Architect: Endrestudio
- Engineering design by: Endrestudio, T. Y. Lin International
- Construction start: February 2017
- Construction end: March 2020
- Construction cost: $22.6 million
- Opened: March 2020

Location
- Interactive map of Dublin Link

The Dublin Link is a pedestrian and bicycle bridge over the Scioto River in Dublin, Ohio. The bridge is the only single-tower S-shaped suspension bridge in the world. The bridge connects Dublin's historic district and downtown on the west bank with the Bridge Street District on the east bank.

The bridge was originally proposed in 1986, and re-proposed in 2007. After planning, studies, and design efforts, construction began in 2017. The bridge was completed and opened on 17 March 2020, after a planned ceremony on March 13 was cancelled due to the COVID-19 pandemic.

== Attributes ==
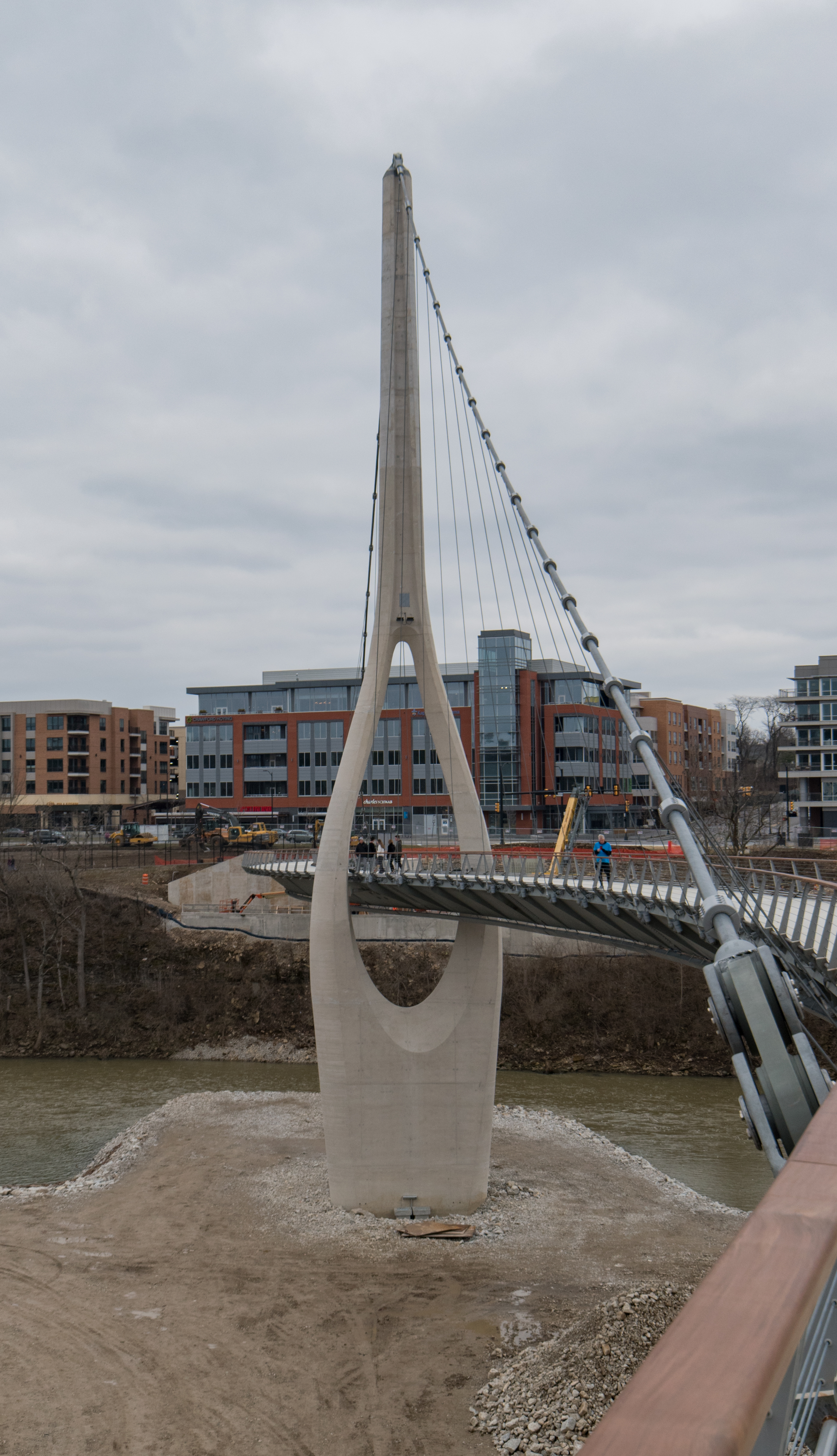
Central tower and suspension cables

The bridge's tower is 169 feet (52 m) tall, with 43 cables (one tie-down cable, two main suspension cables, two restrainer cables, and 38 hanger cables). The two main cables each have a 120 mm (4.7 in) diameter and a tensile force of 3,250,000 lb (1,470,000 kg). The suspension span is 500 ft (150 m), while the total deck length is 760 ft (230 m); the width is 14 ft (4.3 m). The bridge uses 860,000 pounds (390,000 kg) of structural steel and 350,000 lb (160,000 kg) of reinforcing steel, along with 1,600 cubic yards (1,200 m^{3}) of concrete. The bridge's deck passes through the main tower's keyhole. The deck is S-shaped, meant to echo the river's path through the city. It was also designed that way to connect Rock Cress Parkway on the west bank with Bridge Park Avenue on the east, roads that do not directly line up.

The bridge's name was chosen after feedback from about 1,400 Dublin residents. Hundreds suggested "The Link" or similar terms because of the bridge's connectivity between the historic and new portions of Dublin along with the two sides of the river.

The bridge will connect two portions of park space, together known as Riverside Crossing Park. The 36-acre (15 ha) park will include a pavilion, upper and lower terraces, lawns, seating areas, waterfall features, a play space, and bike racks. The park's paths will connect into Dublin's trail system. The upper portion of the park was completed in late 2020, while the remainder was to be completed by 2022.

== History ==
In 1986, Dublin's city council approved a plan to develop a riverfront park, including a suspension bridge over the Scioto River. The first design was proposed in 2007 in a community plan approved by the council. The council and commission members visited Liberty Bridge in Greenville, South Carolina in 2008 to learn about the pedestrian bridge the city built. From 2009 to 2013, planning, feasibility studies, and work sessions took place. In 2015, the bridge cost was estimated at $18.225 million, though the project budget was approved later that year for $22.438 million. Construction began in February 2017 with a planned cost of $22.75 million and projected opening in 2019. Architecture and conceptual engineering design was completed by Endrestudio, with T. Y. Lin International as the engineer of record. In 2019, the bridge's shoring towers were removed, first suspending the bridge. The bridge was set to open in a ceremony on March 13, 2020, with a light show, live music, and group painting activity. The event was cancelled on March 6 for public safety amidst the COVID-19 pandemic.
