= Bridge Park (Dublin, Ohio) =

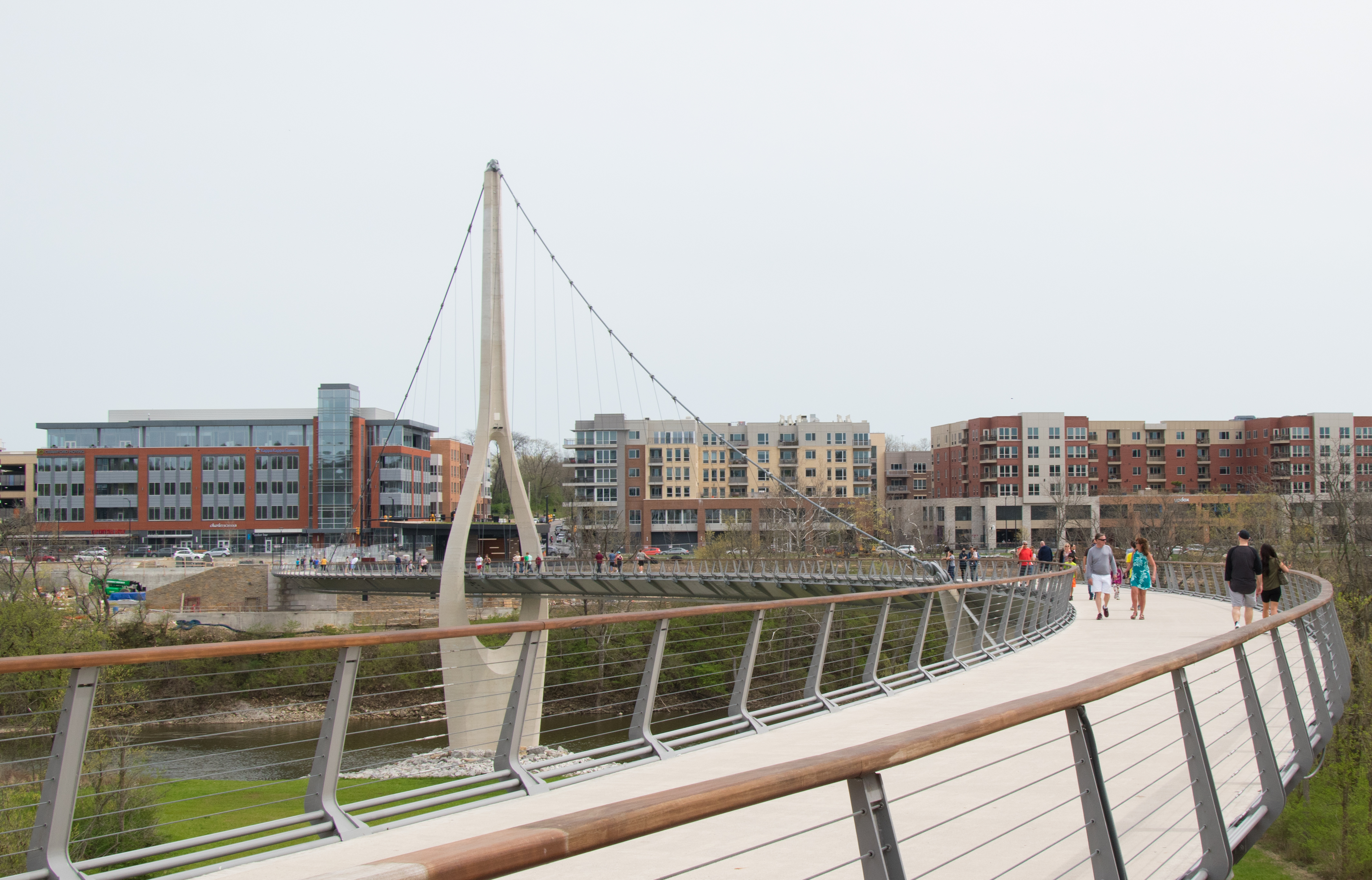
- Bridge Park, with the Dublin Link and the Scioto River in the foreground, in 2021.
- Interactive map of Bridge Park
- Location: Dublin, Ohio
- Coordinates: 40°06′07″N 83°06′42″W
- Website: https://www.bridgepark.com/

Companies
- Developer: Crawford Hoying

Technical details
- Cost: US$800 million

Bridge Park, also called the Bridge Street District, is a commercial district and mixed-use development located in downtown Dublin, Ohio. Located on the Scioto River alongside Riverside Drive (Ohio State Route 257) and Ohio State Route 161, the area offers a wide variety of restaurant and entertainment options, including the Dublin location of the North Market. Bridge Park is connected to historic Downtown Dublin by the Dublin Link.

== History ==
=== Initial planning and construction ===
The initial plans for what would become Bridge Park started around 2007. By 2012, local leaders had developed the Bridge Street Corridor plan, stipulating the development of 1,000 acres around downtown Dublin for dense, mixed-use development. Local developer Crawford Hoying bought the land that would eventually become the Bridge Street District that year. In 2014, the company announced plans to construct a large-scale project with 1,100 units in the Bridge Street Corridor. They had also announced plans beforehand to construct Bridge Park West on the opposite side of the Scioto River and adjacent to downtown Dublin. Construction on the initial phases began in 2015.

Plans for a bridge in the area were first conceived in the 1980s, but was re-proposed in 2007. The Dublin Link, which links Bridge Park with the historic downtown section, began construction in 2017 and opened in 2020. The nearby Riverside Crossing Park was completed by 2021.

=== Expansion and future plans ===
Initial expansions were first planned and open to public review in 2018. By 2019, Crawford Hoying had planned to invest up to $800 million dollars for the project as part of a public-private partnership with the city of Dublin.

The Dublin location of the North Market opened in Bridge Park in 2020. In 2025, plans were provisionally released for Cameron Mitchell's first boutique hotel, which is set to be built in Bridge Park. Construction is expected to begin in 2026.

The project is anticipated to be finished in phases throughout the 2020s. The latest expansion began construction in 2025, with further condominiums and business offices being planned for the expansion. Cenovus Energy will become the anchor tenant of the business offices. To enable further expansion, the Central Ohio Transit Authority (COTA) sold it's park-and-ride lot in the area in May 2026. The expansion is expected to be completed in 2027.
