= John and Annie Glenn Museum =

Museum dedicated to the lives of John & Annie Glenn

John & Annie Glenn Museum
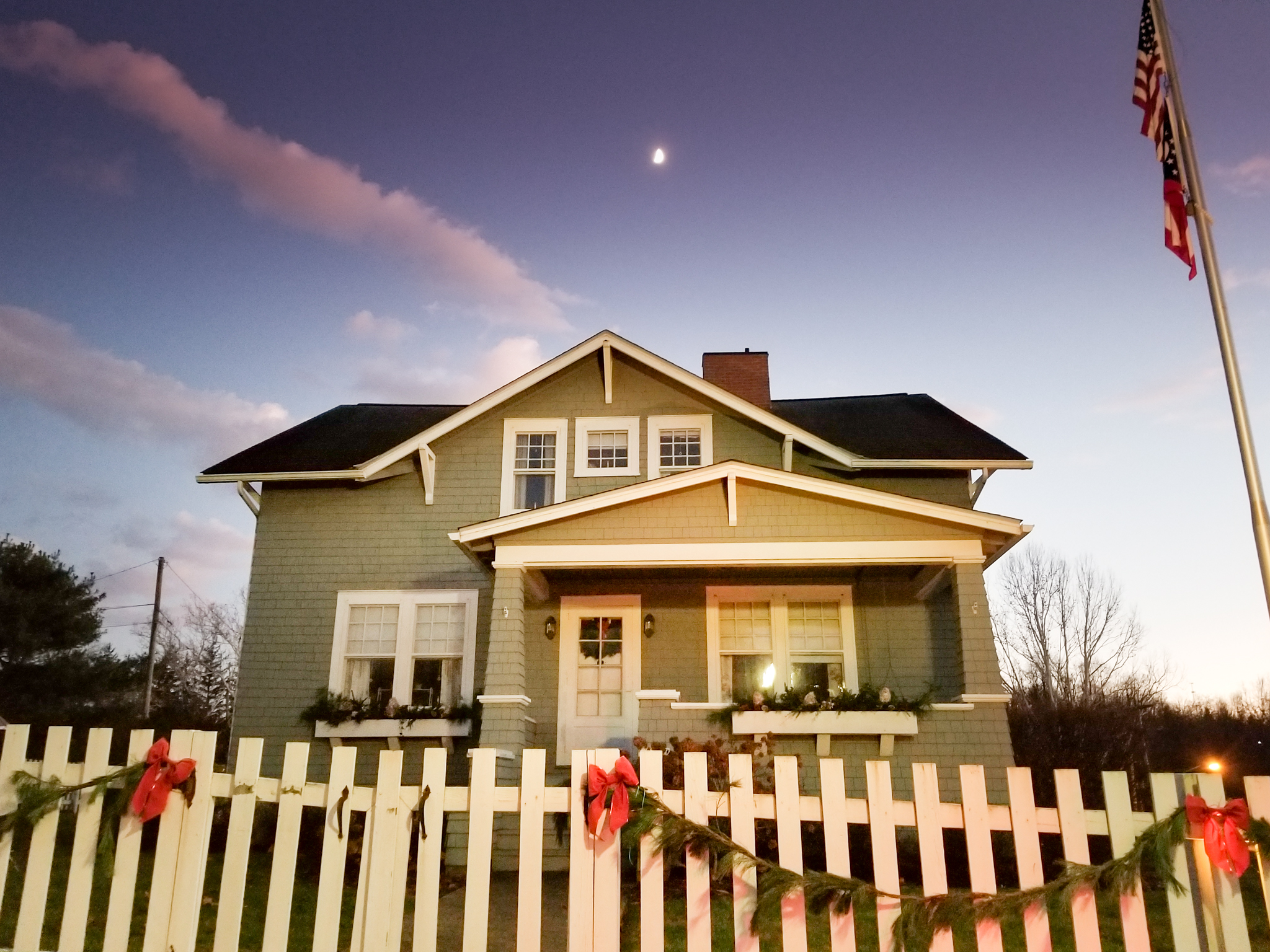
- The John & Annie Glenn Museum
- Established: 1962
- Location: 72 W. Main Street; New Concord, Ohio 43762
- Coordinates: 39.993225°N 81.73625°W
- Website: johnglennhome.org

The John & Annie Glenn Museum is a museum in New Concord, Ohio, United States, honoring astronaut and senator John Glenn and his wife and disability rights advocate Annie Glenn. It is located at the site of Glenn's boyhood home, which has been moved back to Main Street in New Concord, Ohio and restored as it was when he lived there until his enlistment in World War II. The museum is owned by the Ohio History Connection.

== History and mission ==
The mission of the museum is to honor the first American to orbit the Earth and his partnership with a remarkable woman. They also teach about life during the Great Depression and the Home Front during WWII through a living history presentation. The museum on May 19, 2019, was listed on the National Register of Historic Places.
