= Fox Creek S Bridge =

- "S" Bridge II
- U.S. National Register of Historic Places
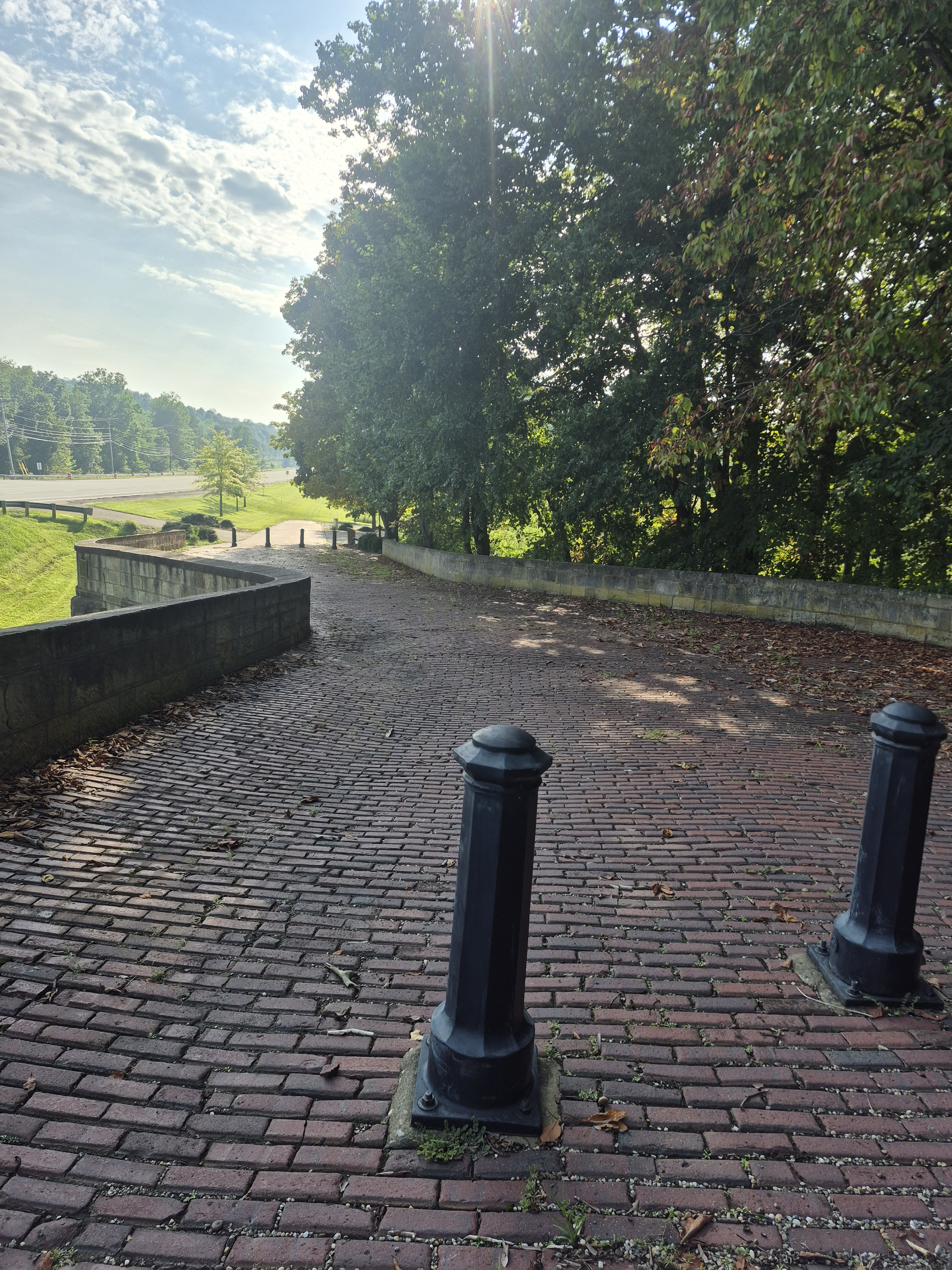
- Brick-paved deck and approach to the Fox Creek S Bridge

- Location within Ohio Location within the United States
- Nearest city: New Concord, Ohio
- Coordinates: 39.992891°N 81.746264°W
- Architect: Benjamin Latrobe
- NRHP reference No.: 73001513
- Added to NRHP: April 23, 1973

"S" Bridge II is a historic S bridge near New Concord, Ohio, United States. A part of the National Road, the first federally-financed highway in the United States, it was built in 1828. In 1973, it was listed on the National Register of Historic Places.
