= Middlebourne, Ohio =

Unincorporated community in Ohio, U.S.

Coordinates: 40°03′04″N 81°20′11″W

Middlebourne is an unincorporated community in Guernsey County, in the U.S. state of Ohio.

== History ==
A post office was established at Middlebourne in 1829, and remained in operation until 1907. The community was so named on account of its relatively central location between Wheeling and Zanesville.

== Notable person ==
- C. Ellis Moore, U.S. Representative from Ohio
