= Reverse curve =

Type of curve on a pathway

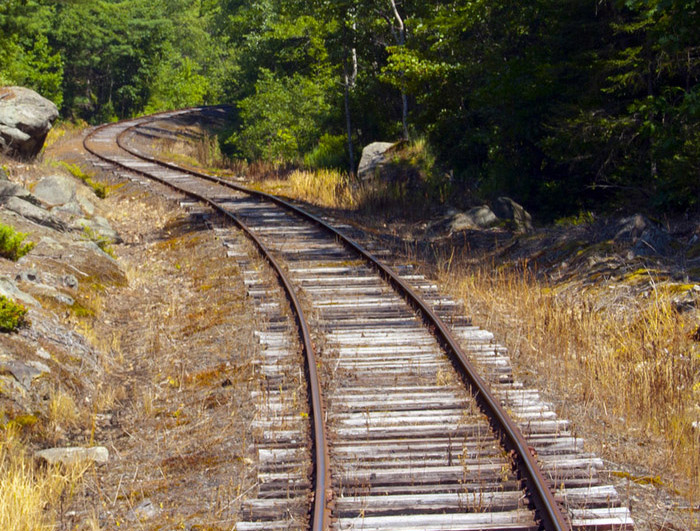
Railroad reverse ("S") curve

In civil engineering, a reverse curve (or "S" curve) is a section of the horizontal alignment of a highway or rail route in which a curve to the left or right is followed immediately by a curve in the opposite direction.

On highways in the United States reverse curves are often announced by the posting of a W1-4L sign (left–right reverse curve) or a W1-4R sign (right–left reverse curve), as called for in the Manual on Uniform Traffic Control Devices.

On rail routes, reverse curves can cause buffer-locking. On the Northeast Corridor in the United States, these also hinder the development of high-speed rail.

== See also ==
- S bridge
- Road curve
- Track geometry
