= Claysville S Bridge =

Historic S bridge in Pennsylvania, US

- "S" Bridge
- U.S. National Register of Historic Places
- Pennsylvania state historical marker
- Washington County History & Landmarks Foundation Landmark
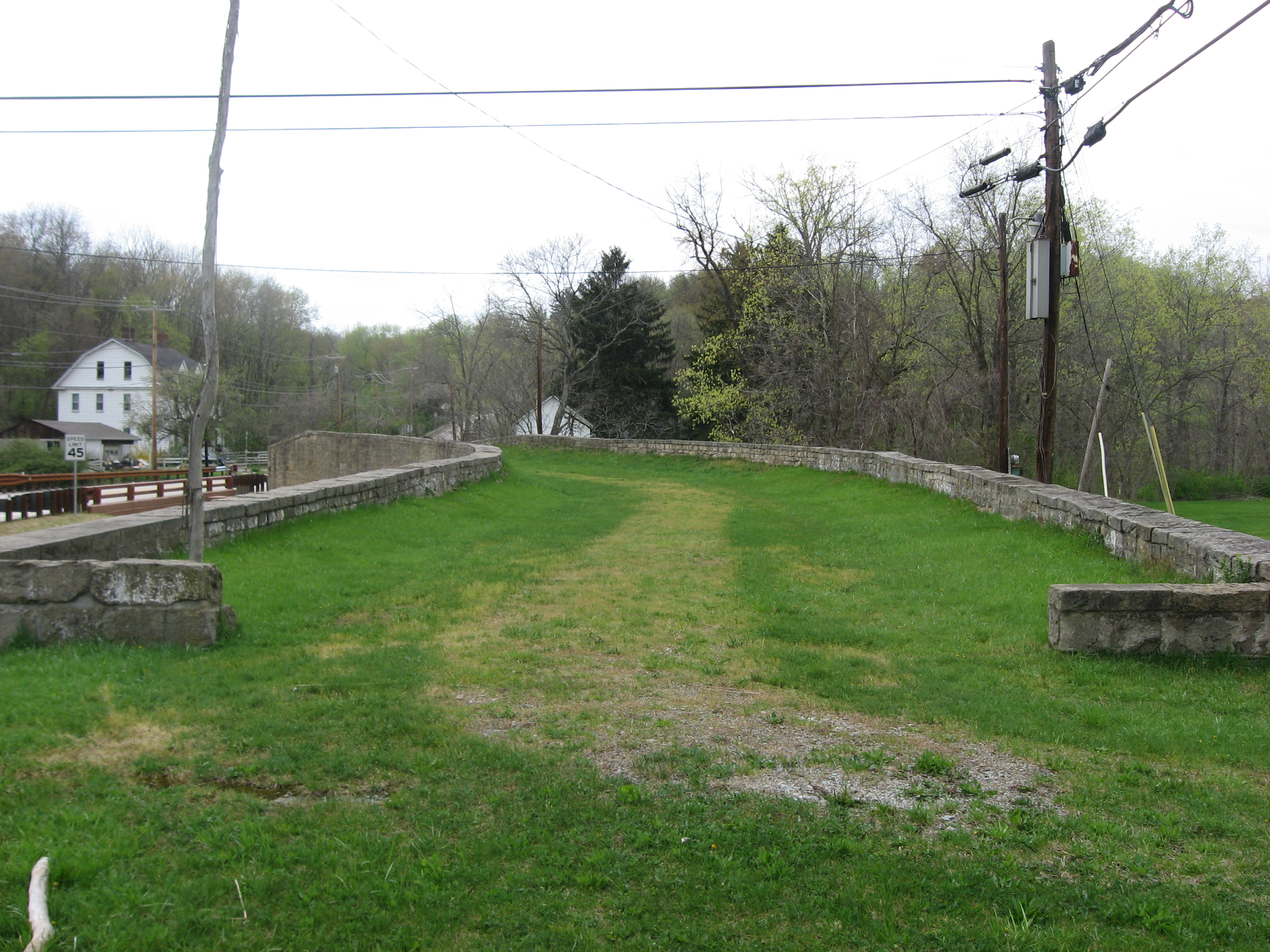
- Eastern end of the bridge

- Location within Pennsylvania Location within the United States
- Nearest city: Washington, Pennsylvania
- Coordinates: 40°8′22″N 80°21′0″W
- Area: 1 acre (0.40 ha)
- Built: 1818
- NRHP reference No.: 75001676

Significant dates
- Added to NRHP: April 04, 1975
- Designated PHMC: May 28, 1947

The Claysville "S" Bridge is a historic S bridge in Washington County, Pennsylvania. The bridge is made of stone and was a part of the Cumberland Road (later National Road) and helped transport wagons and stagecoaches amid the American westward expansion in the early 19th century. It passes over Buffalo Creek.

In 1947, the Pennsylvania Historical and Museum Commission installed a historical marker noting the historic importance of the bridge. It is designated as a historic bridge by the Washington County History & Landmarks Foundation.
