= S Bridge, National Road =

- U.S. National Register of Historic Places
- U.S. National Historic Landmark
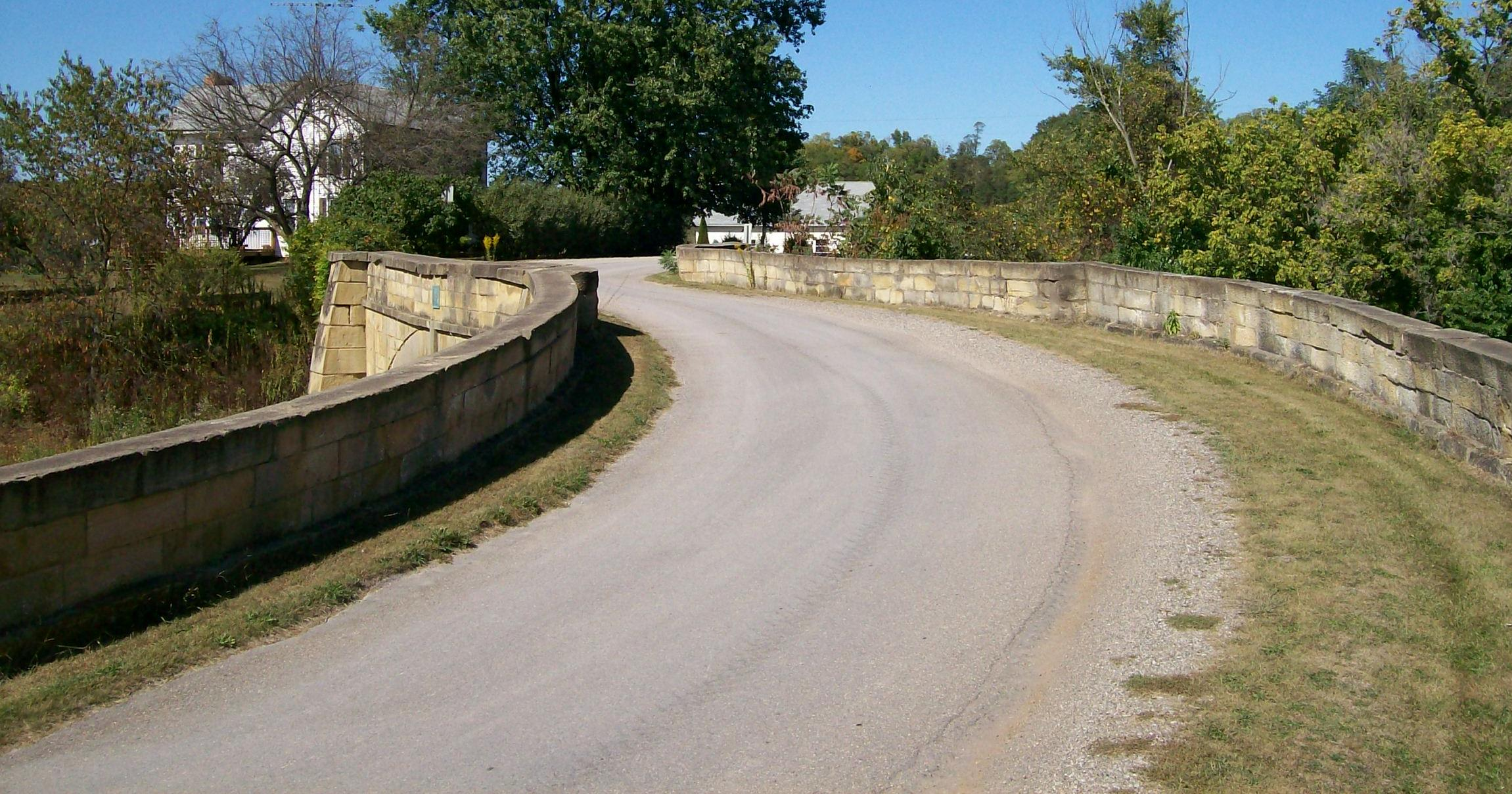
- The S Bridge east of Old Washington in Ohio in 2009

- Location within Ohio Location within the United States
- Nearest city: Old Washington, Ohio
- Coordinates: 40°2′43″N 81°22′27″W
- Area: less than one acre
- Built: 1828
- NRHP reference No.: 66000610

Significant dates
- Added to NRHP: October 15, 1966
- Designated NHL: January 29, 1964

The S Bridge is a historic stone arch bridge, spanning Salt Fork about 4 miles (6.4 km) east of Old Washington, Ohio. Built in 1828, it is one of the best-preserved surviving bridges built for the westward expansion of the National Road from Wheeling, West Virginia to Columbus, Ohio. S bridges derive their name from the sharply curving approaches to the span. The bridge was designated a National Historic Landmark in 1964. The bridge is closed to traffic, and may be seen from Blend Road on the north and Rhinehart Road on the south.

== Description and history ==
The S Bridge is located about four miles east of Old Washington, just north of the current alignments of Interstate 70 and County Road 690. The latter provides access to the roads leading to the bridge, Blend Road and Rhinehart Road. The road alignment it follows is historically that of the National Road, and later United States Route 40. The bridge is approximately 185 feet (56 m) long, including approach elements. The main span is a segmented stone arch, whose crown is typically 18 inches (46 cm) above the streambed. The bridge is built out of randomly laid ashlar stone, which rises to low parapets giving a roadway width of 26 feet (7.9 m). There are large stone buttresses reinforcing each end of the arched section. The bridge's characteristic S shape is derived from the sharply curving approaches on either side of the main span.

The National Road was a project authorized by the United States Congress when it created the state of Ohio, in order to provide a reliable transport route across the Appalachian Mountains. The road was completed to Wheeling in 1818, and Congress authorized an extension to Columbus in 1825. This bridge was built as part of that expansion project, and was the major route by which Ohio and the Old Northwest were settled. This is one of four surviving S bridges built in Ohio for the National Road.

== See also ==
- National Historic Landmarks in Ohio
- List of bridges on the National Register of Historic Places in Ohio
