= New Concord, Ohio =

- Village
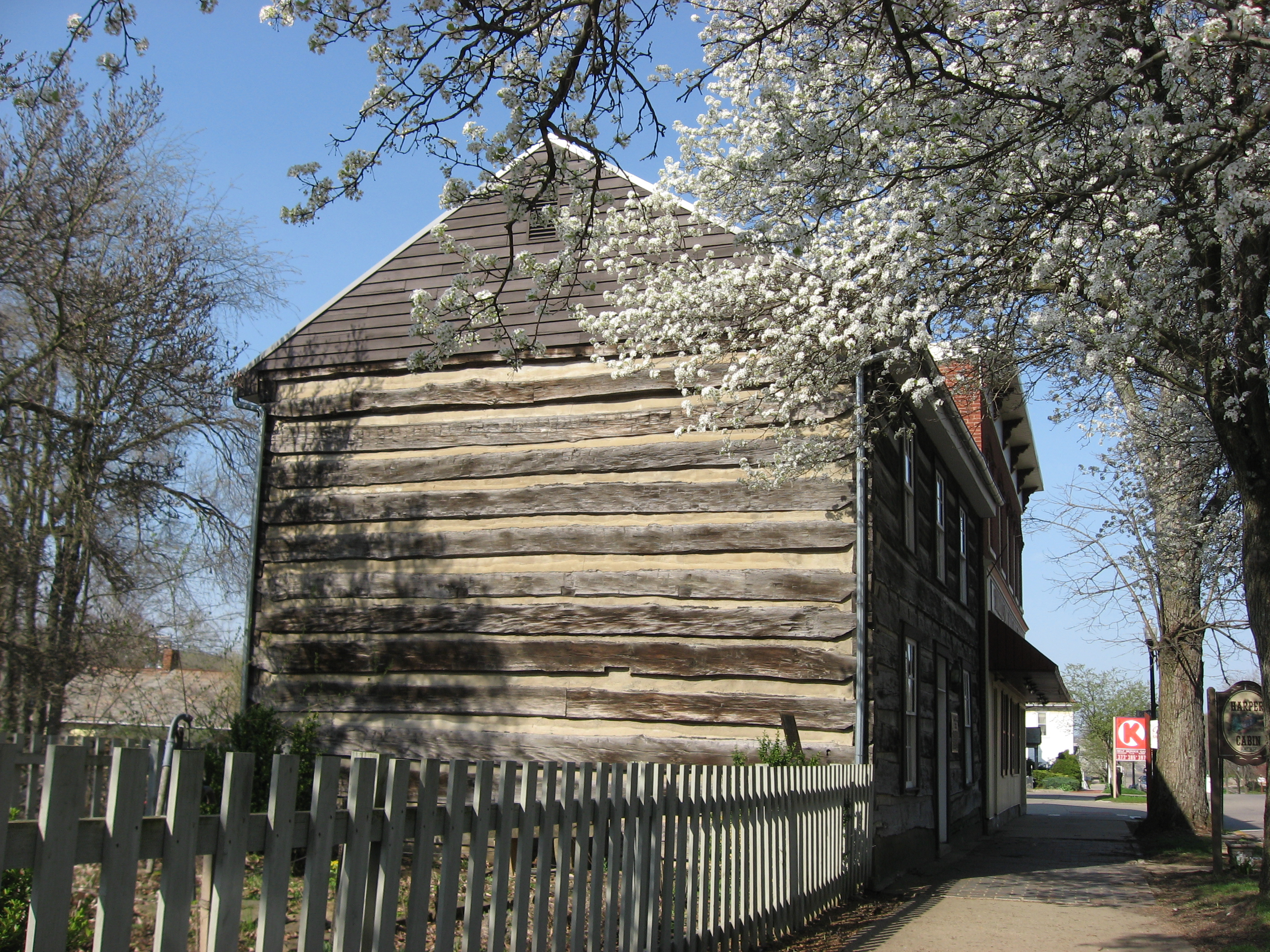
- William Rainey Harper Log House

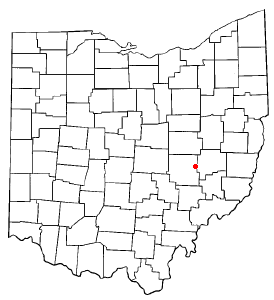
- Location of New Concord, Ohio

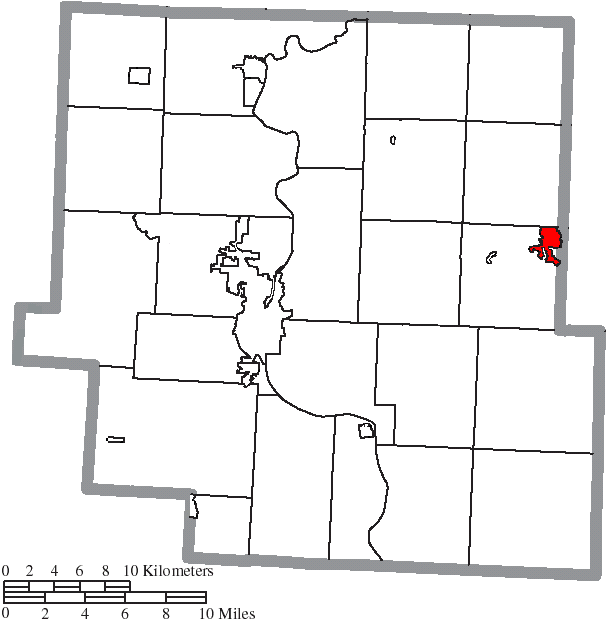
- Location of New Concord in Muskingum County
- Coordinates: 39°59′40″N 81°44′18″W
- Country: United States
- State: Ohio
- County: Muskingum
- Townships: Highland, Union

Area
  - Total: 1.81 sq mi (4.68 km^{2})
  - Land: 1.81 sq mi (4.68 km^{2})
  - Water: 0 sq mi (0.00 km^{2})
- Elevation: 869 ft (265 m)

Population (2020)
  - Total: 2,361
  - Density: 1,305.8/sq mi (504.16/km^{2})
- Time zone: UTC-5 (Eastern (EST))
  - Summer (DST): UTC-4 (EDT)
- ZIP code: 43762
- Area code: 740
- FIPS code: 39-54446
- GNIS feature ID: 2399460
- Website: https://newconcord-oh.gov/

New Concord (/ˈkɒnˌkɔːrd/) is a village in Muskingum County, Ohio, United States. The population was 2,361 as of the 2020 census. It is part of the Zanesville micropolitan area. New Concord is the home of Muskingum University and is served by a branch of the Muskingum County Library System.

== History ==
New Concord was laid out in 1828 when the National Road was extended to that point. In 1837, almost ten years later, Muskingum University was founded with its first class graduating in 1839. A post office named New Concord has been in operation since 1832. As U.S. Route 40 was a large connector for trade, New Concord became a stopping place for those who came through until bypassed by Interstate 70 in the 1960s and 1970s.

== Geography ==
According to the United States Census Bureau, the village has a total area of 1.63 square miles (4.22 km^{2}), all land.

New Concord is located on U.S. Route 40, the old National Road, and just off the newer Interstate 70 which parallels it.

== Demographics ==
Historical population
Census	Pop.	Note	%±
1850	337		—
1860	474		40.7%
1870	488		3.0%
1880	514		5.3%
1890	719		39.9%
1900	675		−6.1%
1910	683		1.2%
1920	889		30.2%
1930	1,087		22.3%
1940	1,067		−1.8%
1950	1,797		68.4%
1960	2,127		18.4%
1970	2,318		9.0%
1980	1,860		−19.8%
1990	2,086		12.2%
2000	2,651		27.1%
2010	2,491		−6.0%
2020	2,361		−5.2%
U.S. Decennial Census

=== 2000 census ===
As of the census of 2000, there were 2,651 people, 672 households, and 376 families living in the village. The population density was 1,771.0 inhabitants per square mile (683.8/km^{2}). There were 709 housing units at an average density of 473.6 per square mile (182.9/km^{2}). The racial makeup of the village was 96.15% White, 1.43% African American, 0.11% Native American, 1.66% Asian, 0.08% from other races, and 0.57% from two or more races. Hispanic or Latino of any race were 0.91% of the population.

There were 672 households, out of which 26.8% had children under the age of 18 living with them, 44.5% were married couples living together, 9.7% had a female householder with no husband present, and 44.0% were non-families. 36.3% of all households were made up of individuals, and 15.5% had someone living alone who was 65 years of age or older. The average household size was 2.24 and the average family size was 2.93.

In the village, the population was spread out, with 12.7% under the age of 18, 48.5% from 18 to 24, 13.6% from 25 to 44, 12.8% from 45 to 64, and 12.4% who were 65 years of age or older. The median age was 22 years. For every 100 females there were 85.1 males. For every 100 females age 18 and over, there were 85.3 males.

The median income for a household in the village was $27,011, and the median income for a family was $43,333. Males had a median income of $34,750 versus $25,583 for females. The per capita income for the village was $17,973. About 16.1% of families and 24.6% of the population were below the poverty line, including 29.2% of those under age 18 and 13.5% of those aged 65 or over.

=== 2010 census ===
As of the census of 2010, there were 2,491 people, 670 households, and 366 families living in the village. The population density was 1,528.2 inhabitants per square mile (590.0/km^{2}). There were 745 housing units at an average density of 457.1 per square mile (176.5/km^{2}). The racial makeup of the village was 96.1% White, 1.2% African American, 0.1% Native American, 1.0% Asian, 0.4% from other races, and 1.1% from two or more races. Hispanic or Latino of any race were 1.0% of the population.

There were 670 households, of which 25.7% had children under the age of 18 living with them, 38.8% were married couples living together, 10.1% had a female householder with no husband present, 5.7% had a male householder with no wife present, and 45.4% were non-families. 33.7% of all households were made up of individuals, and 14.2% had someone living alone who was 65 years of age or older. The average household size was 2.27 and the average family size was 2.78.

The median age in the village was 22.5 years. 12% of residents were under the age of 18; 46.6% were between the ages of 18 and 24; 14% were from 25 to 44; 14.6% were from 45 to 64; and 13% were 65 years of age or older. The gender makeup of the village was 45.2% male and 54.8% female.

== Culture ==
Much of the culture in New Concord exists in music. Southeastern Ohio Symphony Orchestra, directed and conducted by Dr. Laura Schumann, is based in Brown Chapel on Muskingum University's campus, operating in partnership with Muskingum University. John Glenn High School also contains various travelling ensembles including String Sounds (a strolling strings group), a travelling choir, and a travelling steel drum band, in addition to their concert groups.

== Notable people ==
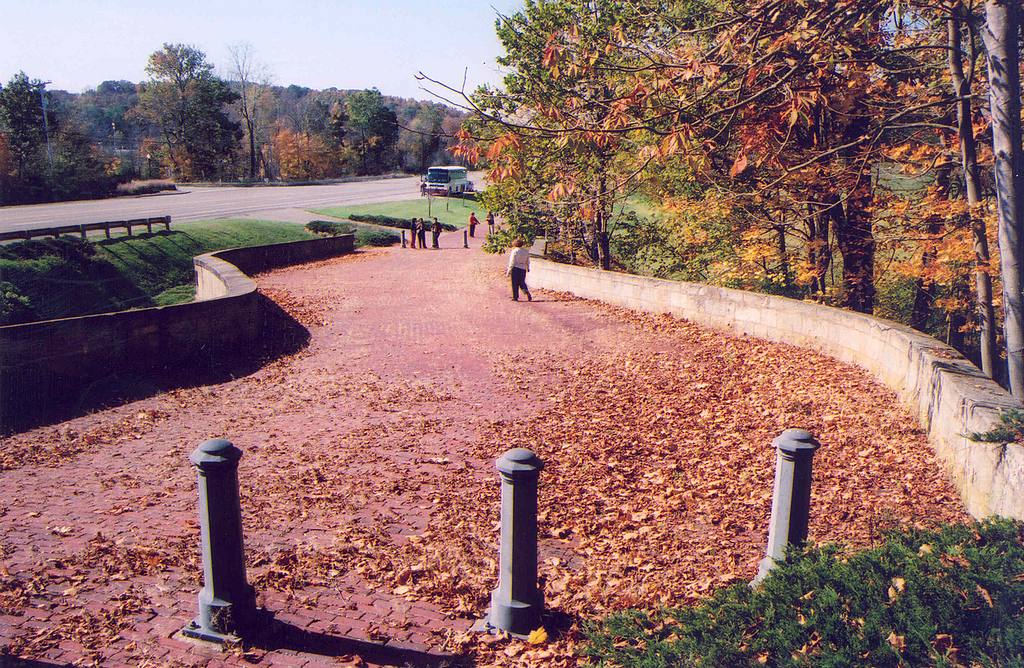
"S" Bridge II

- John Glenn, former United States Senator from Ohio and the first American to orbit the Earth
- William Rainey Harper, founder and first president of the University of Chicago
- David W. Stewart, United States Senator from Iowa

== Places of interest ==
- "S" Bridge II
- Muskingum University
- John & Annie Glenn Museum
