= Adams Township, Guernsey County, Ohio =

Township in Ohio, US

- Township
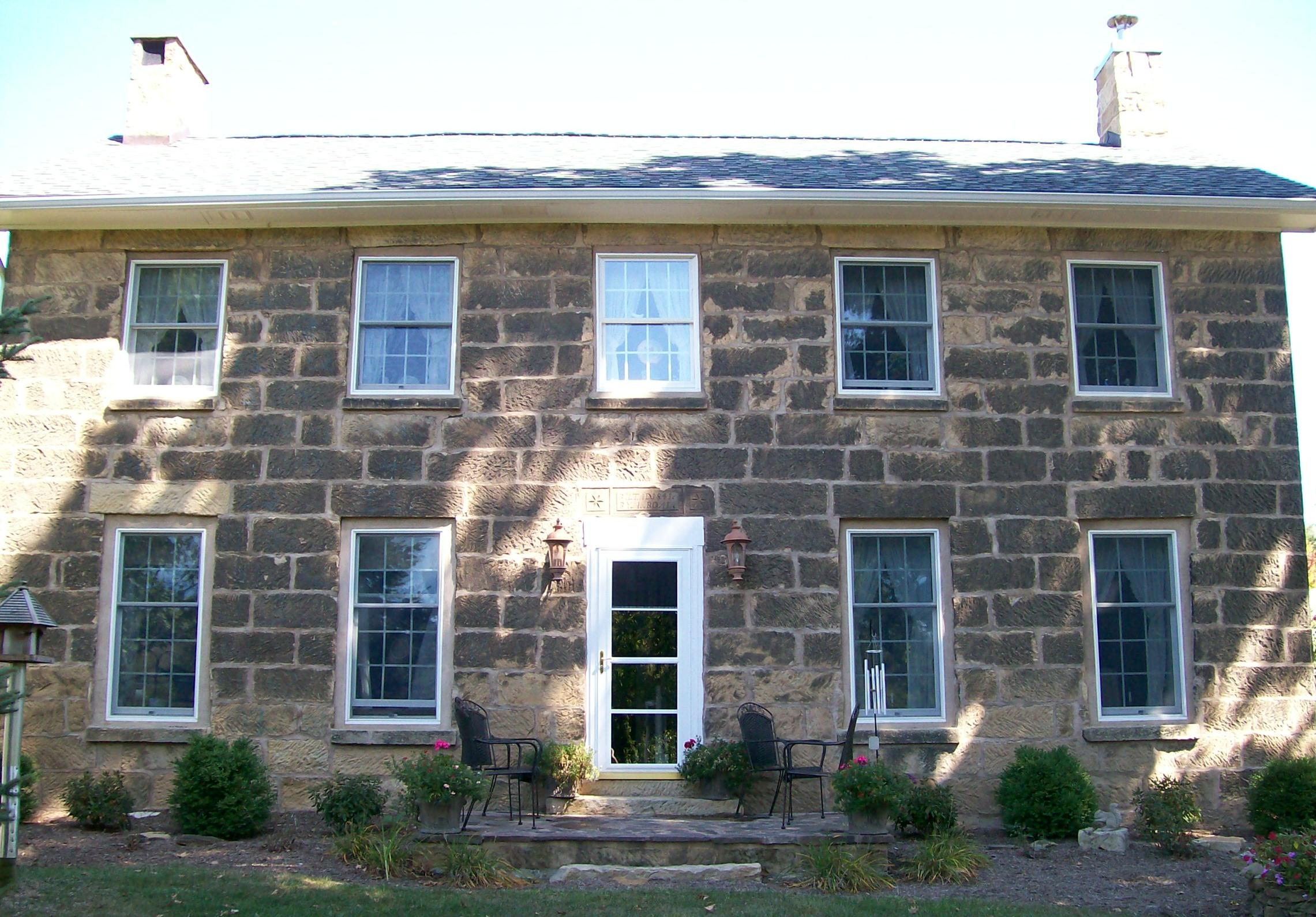
- Samuel Harper Stone House, built 1841

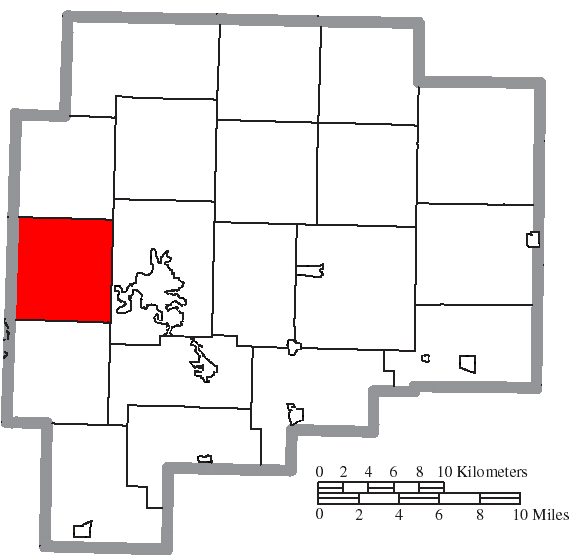
- Location of Adams Township in Guernsey County
- Coordinates: 40°1′45″N 81°40′7″W
- Country: United States
- State: Ohio
- County: Guernsey

Area
  - Total: 25.2 sq mi (65.3 km^{2})
  - Land: 25.2 sq mi (65.3 km^{2})
  - Water: 0 sq mi (0.0 km^{2})
- Elevation: 994 ft (303 m)

Population (2020)
  - Total: 1,872
  - Density: 74.2/sq mi (28.7/km^{2})
- Time zone: UTC-5 (Eastern (EST))
  - Summer (DST): UTC-4 (EDT)
- FIPS code: 39-00282
- GNIS feature ID: 1086177

Adams Township is one of the nineteen townships of Guernsey County, Ohio, United States. As of the 2020 census the population was 1,872.

== Geography ==
Located in the western part of the county, it borders the following townships:

- Knox Township - north
- Cambridge Township - east
- Westland Township - south
- Union Township, Muskingum County - southwest corner
- Highland Township, Muskingum County - west
- Monroe Township, Muskingum County - northwest corner

No municipalities are located in Adams Township.

== Name and history ==
Adams Township was organized in 1827. It is one of ten Adams Townships statewide.

== Government ==
The township is governed by a three-member board of trustees, who are elected in November of odd-numbered years to a four-year term beginning on the following January 1. Two are elected in the year after the presidential election and one is elected in the year before it. There is also an elected township fiscal officer, who serves a four-year term beginning on April 1 of the year after the election, which is held in November of the year before the presidential election. Vacancies in the fiscal officership or on the board of trustees are filled by the remaining trustees.
