= Brookfield Township, Ohio =

Brookfield Township, Ohio, may refer to:

- Brookfield Township, Noble County, Ohio
- Brookfield Township, Trumbull County, Ohio
