= Rich Hill (disambiguation) =

Rich Hill (born 1980) is an American professional baseball pitcher.

Rich Hill may also refer to:

== Places ==
- Rich Hill, Arizona, an early gold mine near Weaver, Arizona
- Rich Hill (Bel Alton, Maryland), listed on the National Register of Historic Places
- Rich Hill, Missouri, a city in Missouri
- Rich Hill (Sassafras, Maryland), listed on the National Register of Historic Places
- Rich Hill, Ohio, an unincorporated community in Knox County
- Rich Hill (Ohio), a summit in Knox County
- Rich Hill Township, Muskingum County, Ohio

== People ==
- Rich Hill (baseball coach) (born 1962), American head baseball coach at the University of Hawaii at Manoa

== Media ==
- Rich Hill (film), a 2014 American documentary film

== See also ==
- Richhill (disambiguation)
- Richard Hill (disambiguation)
