= Jackson Township, Guernsey County, Ohio =

Township in Ohio, US

- Township
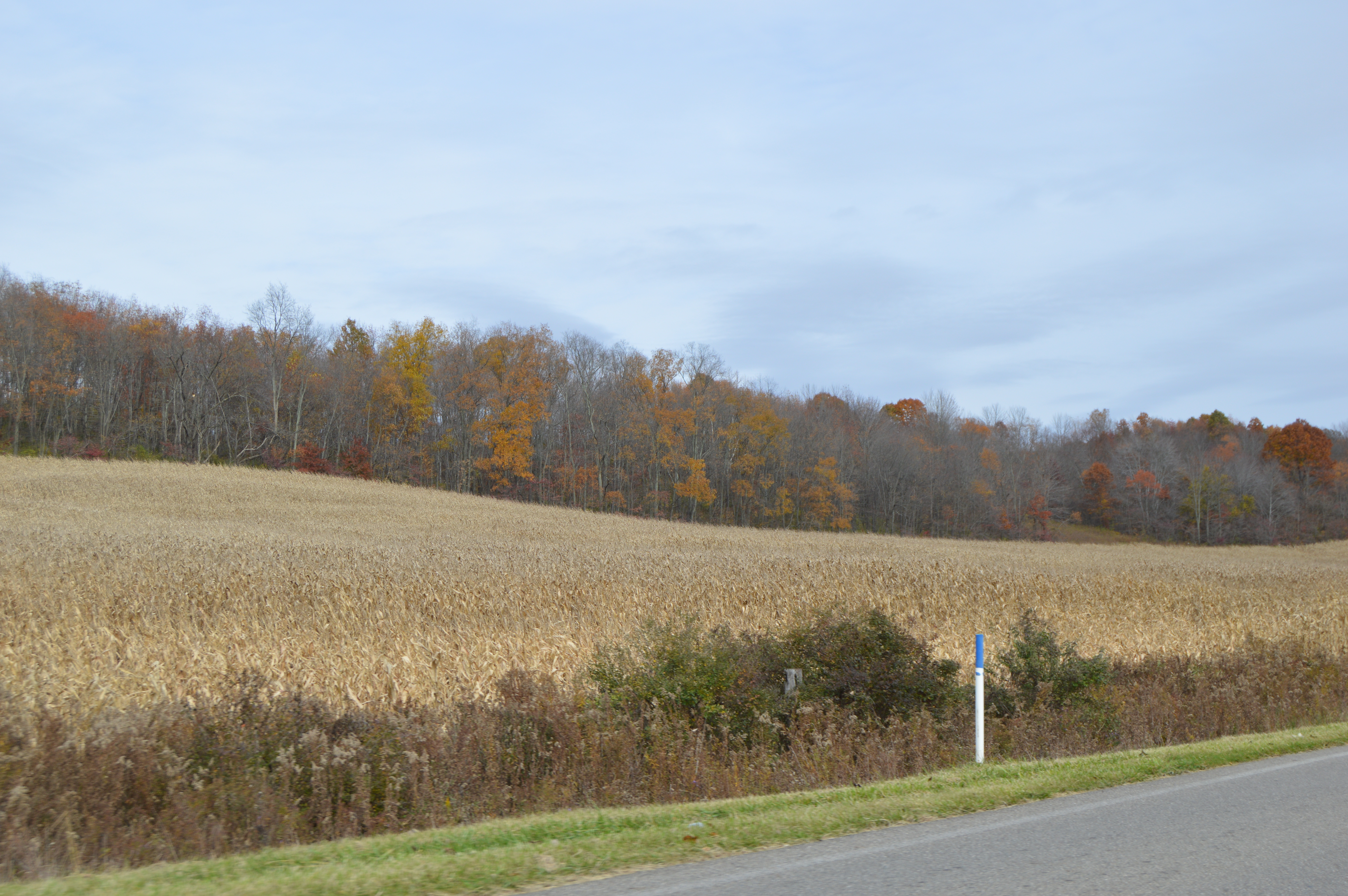
- Fields along Ideal Road, northeast of Byesville

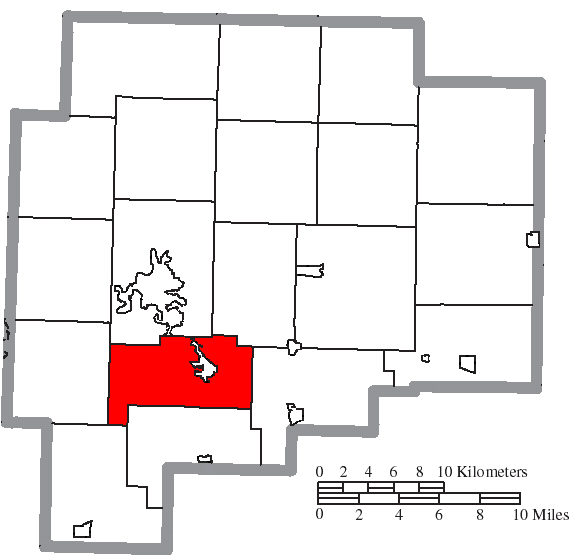
- Location of Jackson Township in Guernsey County
- Coordinates: 39°58′17″N 81°33′11″W
- Country: United States
- State: Ohio
- County: Guernsey

Area
  - Total: 24.2 sq mi (62.8 km^{2})
  - Land: 24.2 sq mi (62.6 km^{2})
  - Water: 0.077 sq mi (0.2 km^{2})
- Elevation: 915 ft (279 m)

Population (2020)
  - Total: 4,998
  - Density: 207/sq mi (79.8/km^{2})
- Time zone: UTC-5 (Eastern (EST))
  - Summer (DST): UTC-4 (EDT)
- FIPS code: 39-37786
- GNIS feature ID: 1086180

Jackson Township is one of the nineteen townships of Guernsey County, Ohio, United States. As of the 2020 census the population was 4,998.

== Geography ==
Located in the southwestern part of the county, it borders the following townships:

- Cambridge Township - north
- Center Township - northeast
- Richland Township - east
- Valley Township - south
- Spencer Township - southwest
- Westland Township - west

The village of Byesville is located in central Jackson Township, and the southern end of the city of Cambridge is in the northern part of the township.

== Name and history ==
Jackson Township was organized in 1824, and named for General Andrew Jackson, afterward seventh President of the United States. It is one of thirty-seven Jackson Townships statewide.

== Schools ==
Children from Jackson Township would have attended these schools in the early to mid 1900s: Ideal School, Happy Dale School, Garfield School (A.K.A. Stop Nine School), Lincoln School, Central (High) School and Byesville High (Elementary) School. The current public schools of the township are made up from the Rolling Hills Local School District: Byesville Elementary School, Brook Intermediate School, Meadowbrook Middle School and Meadowbrook High School.

== Government ==
The township is governed by a three-member board of trustees, who are elected in November of odd-numbered years to a four-year term beginning on the following January 1. Two are elected in the year after the presidential election and one is elected in the year before it. There is also an elected township fiscal officer, who serves a four-year term beginning on April 1 of the year after the election, which is held in November of the year before the presidential election. Vacancies in the fiscal officership or on the board of trustees are filled by the remaining trustees.
