= Salem Township, Muskingum County, Ohio =

Township in Ohio, US

- Township
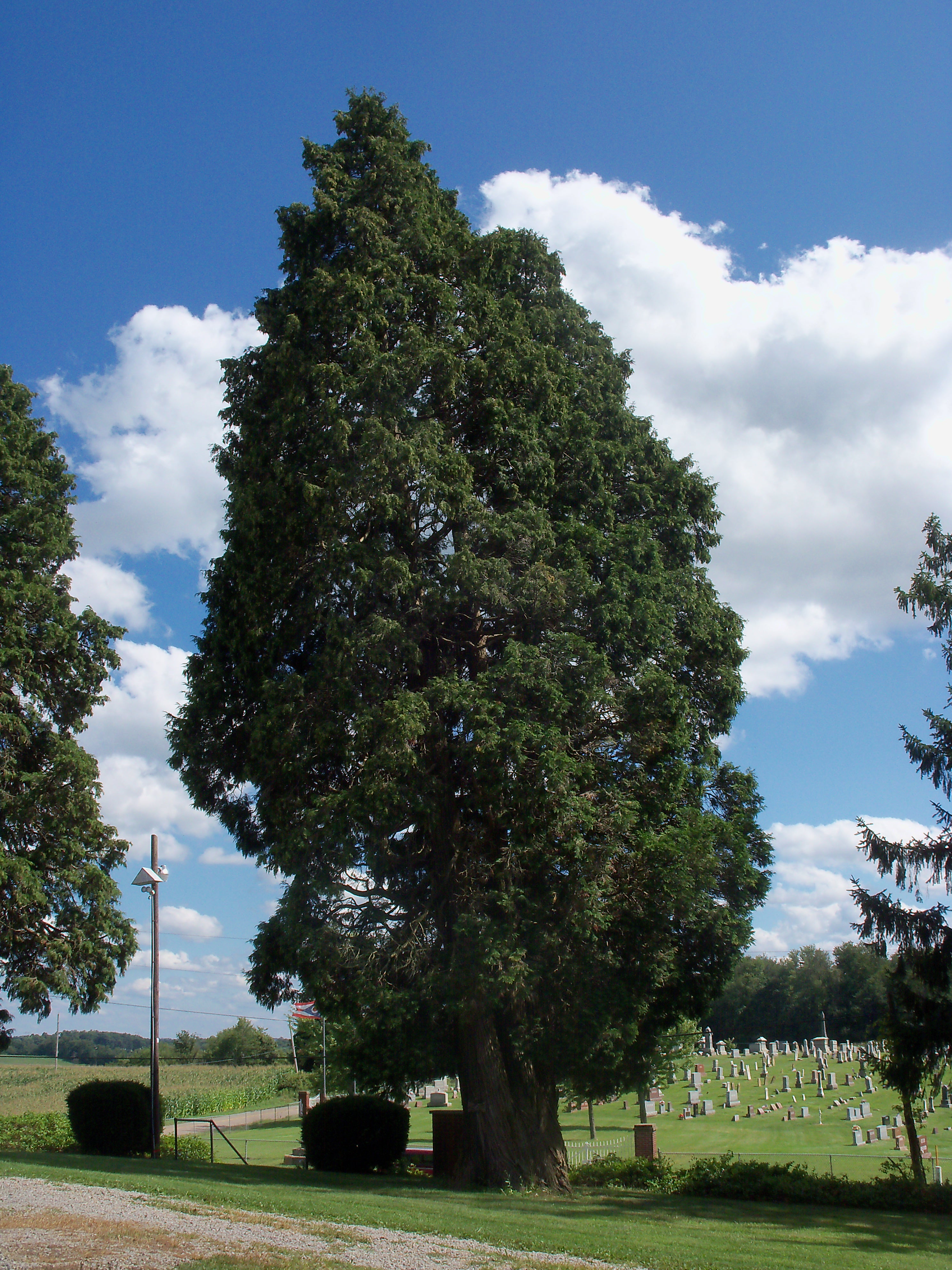
- Ohio's largest known Atlantic White Cedar stands in front of New Hope Lutheran Church

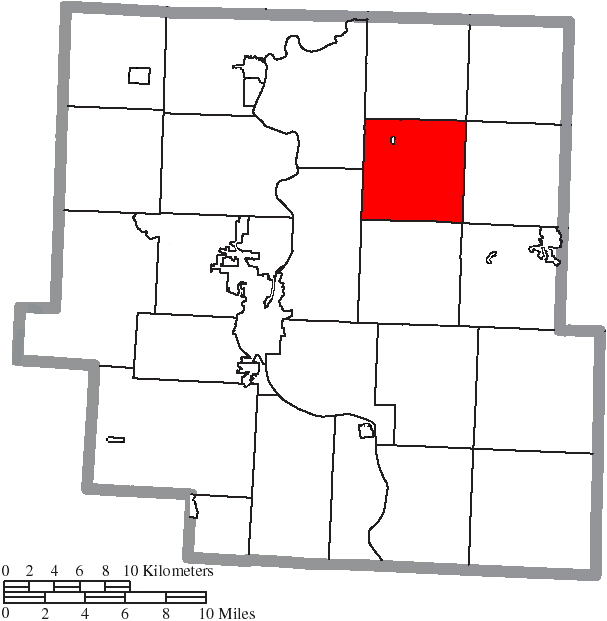
- Location of Salem Township in Muskingum County
- Coordinates: 40°3′36″N 81°52′33″W
- Country: United States
- State: Ohio
- County: Muskingum

Area
  - Total: 25.2 sq mi (65.3 km^{2})
  - Land: 25.2 sq mi (65.3 km^{2})
  - Water: 0 sq mi (0.0 km^{2})
- Elevation: 856 ft (261 m)

Population (2020)
  - Total: 946
  - Density: 37.5/sq mi (14.5/km^{2})
- Time zone: UTC-5 (Eastern (EST))
  - Summer (DST): UTC-4 (EDT)
- FIPS code: 39-69932
- GNIS feature ID: 1086732

Salem Township is one of the twenty-five townships of Muskingum County, Ohio, United States. The 2020 census found 946 people in the township.

== Geography ==
Located in the northeastern part of the county, it borders the following townships:

- Adams Township - north
- Monroe Township - northeast corner
- Highland Township - east
- Union Township - southeast corner
- Perry Township - south
- Washington Township - southwest
- Madison Township - northwest

The village of Adamsville is located in northwestern Salem Township.

== Name and history ==
Salem Township was named after Salem, Massachusetts, the native home of a large share of the early settlers. It is one of fourteen Salem Townships statewide.

By the 1830s, Salem Township had a gristmill, a saw mill and two churches.

== Government ==
The township is governed by a three-member board of trustees, who are elected in November of odd-numbered years to a four-year term beginning on the following January 1. Two are elected in the year after the presidential election and one is elected in the year before it. There is also an elected township fiscal officer, who serves a four-year term beginning on April 1 of the year after the election, which is held in November of the year before the presidential election. Vacancies in the fiscal officership or on the board of trustees are filled by the remaining trustees.
