= Highland Township, Muskingum County, Ohio =

Township in Ohio, US

- Township
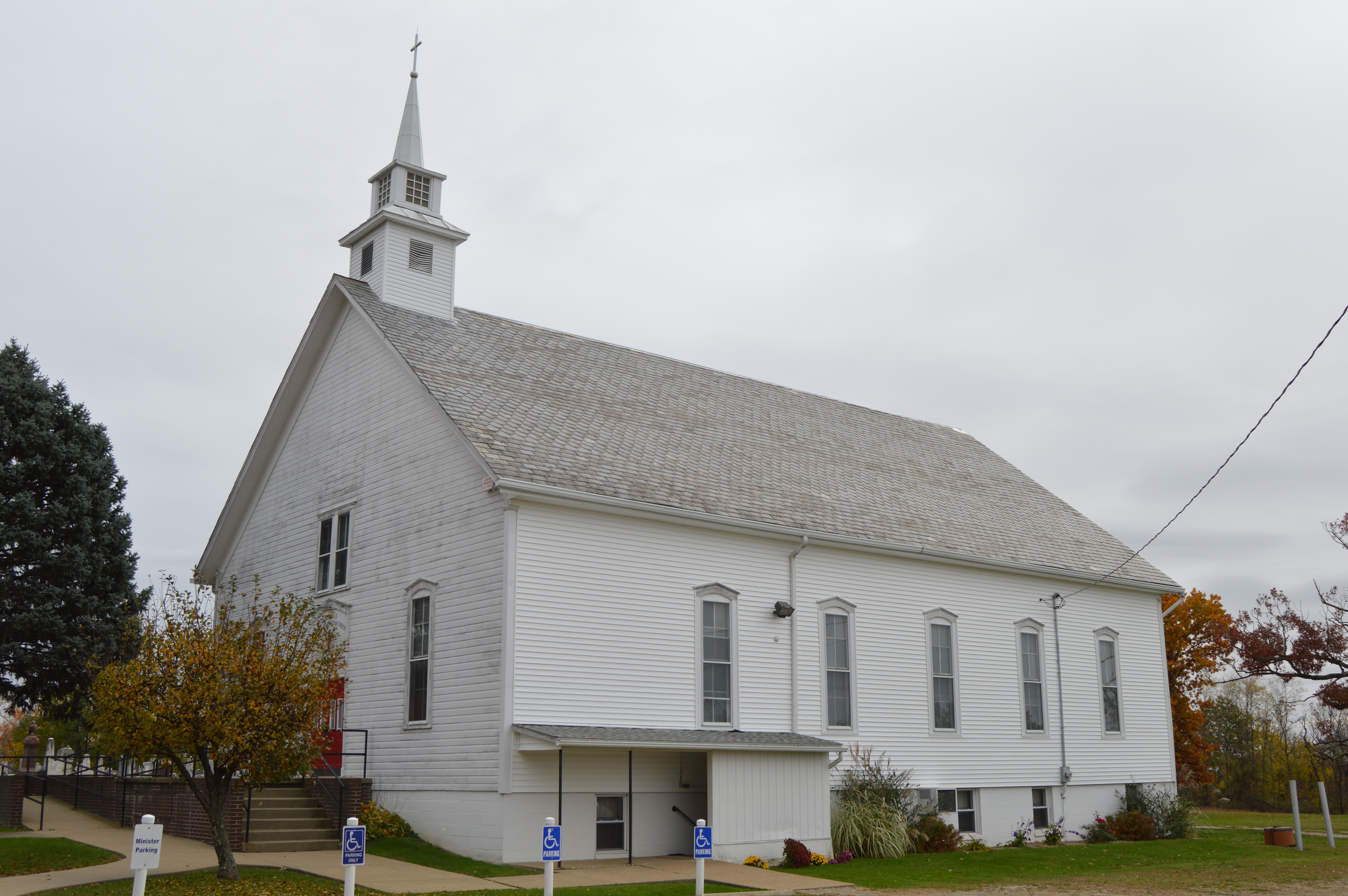
- Presbyterian church at Bloomfield

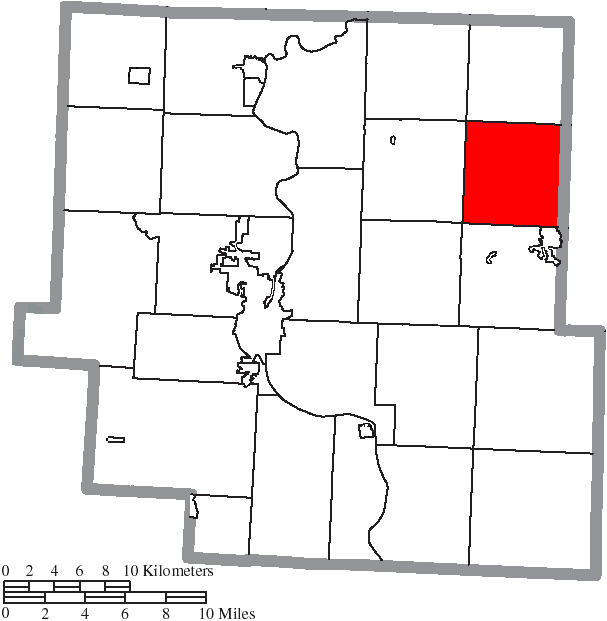
- Location of Highland Township in Muskingum County
- Coordinates: 40°3′28″N 81°45′49″W
- Country: United States
- State: Ohio
- County: Muskingum

Area
  - Total: 25.3 sq mi (65.4 km^{2})
  - Land: 25.2 sq mi (65.3 km^{2})
  - Water: 0.039 sq mi (0.1 km^{2})
- Elevation: 1,089 ft (332 m)

Population (2020)
  - Total: 902
  - Density: 35.8/sq mi (13.8/km^{2})
- Time zone: UTC-5 (Eastern (EST))
  - Summer (DST): UTC-4 (EDT)
- FIPS code: 39-35238
- GNIS feature ID: 1086720

Highland Township is one of the twenty-five townships of Muskingum County, Ohio, United States. The 2020 census found 902 people in the township.

== Geography ==
Located on the eastern edge of the county, it borders the following townships:

- Monroe Township - north
- Knox Township, Guernsey County - northeast corner
- Adams Township, Guernsey County - east
- Westland Township, Guernsey County - southeast corner
- Union Township - south
- Perry Township - southwest corner
- Salem Township - west
- Adams Township - northwest corner

No municipalities are located in Highland Township.

== Name and history ==
Highland Township was so named for the lofty elevation of the land within its borders. Statewide, the only other Highland Township is located in Defiance County.

By the 1830s, Highland Township had two saw mills, two gristmills, and two churches.

== Government ==
The township is governed by a three-member board of trustees, who are elected in November of odd-numbered years to a four-year term beginning on the following January 1. Two are elected in the year after the presidential election and one is elected in the year before it. There is also an elected township fiscal officer, who serves a four-year term beginning on April 1 of the year after the election, which is held in November of the year before the presidential election. Vacancies in the fiscal officership or on the board of trustees are filled by the remaining trustees.
