= Madison Township, Muskingum County, Ohio =

Township in Ohio, US

- Township
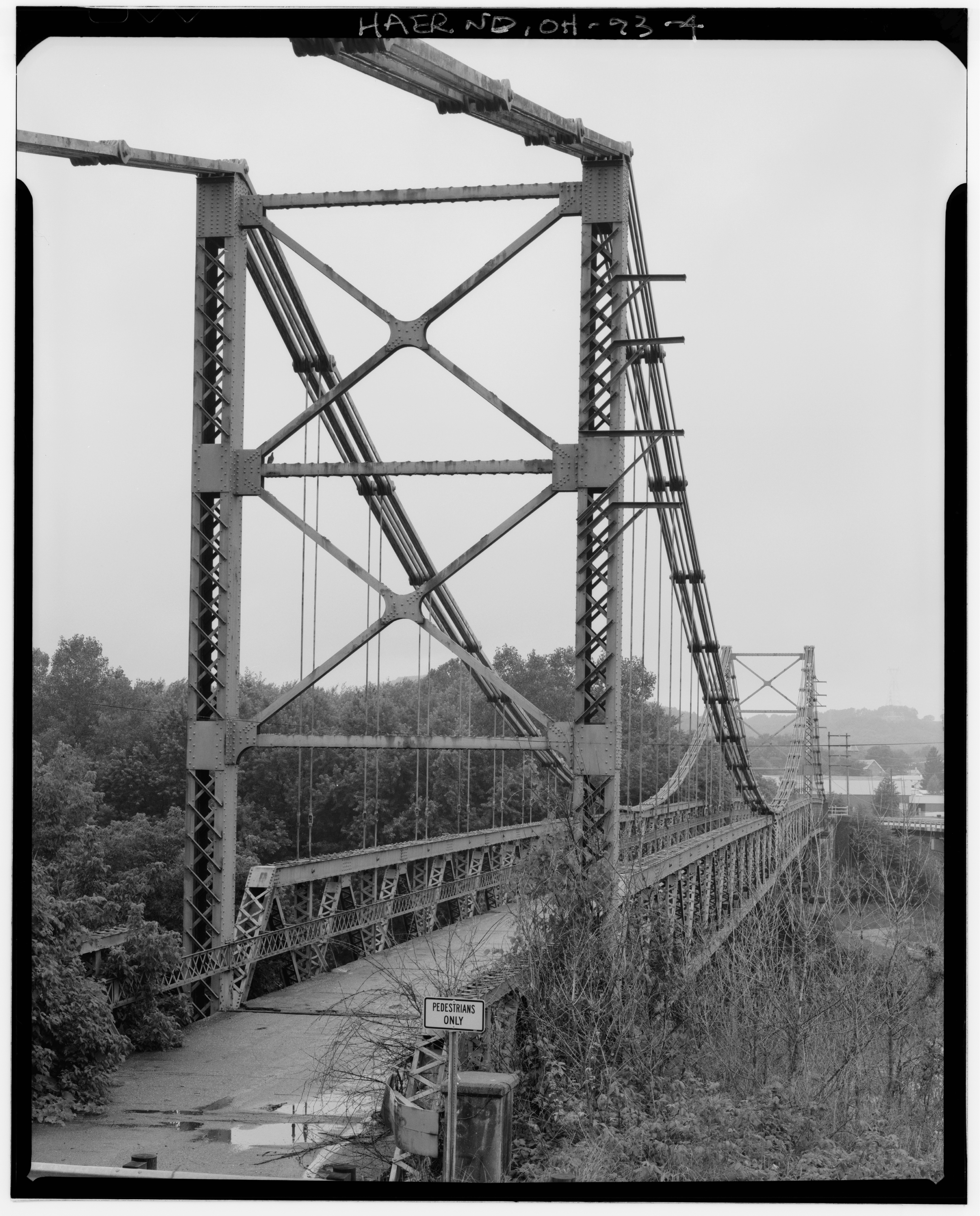
- Dresden Suspension Bridge

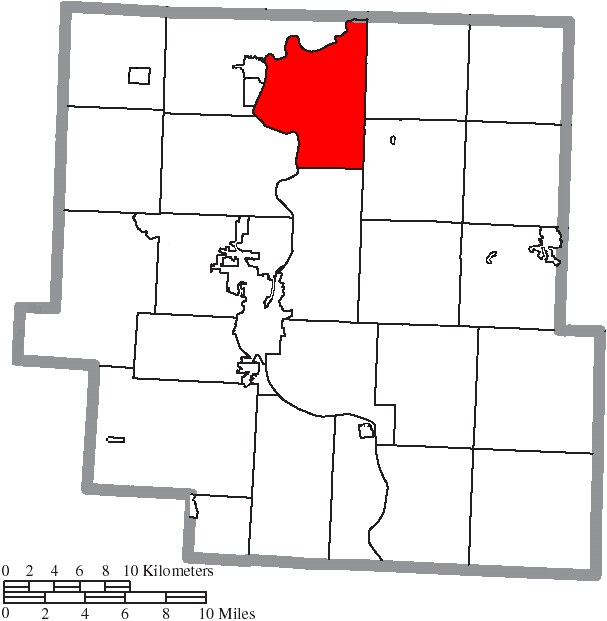
- Location of Madison Township in Muskingum County
- Coordinates: 40°5′0″N 81°57′8″W
- Country: United States
- State: Ohio
- County: Muskingum

Area
  - Total: 28.8 sq mi (74.5 km^{2})
  - Land: 28.1 sq mi (72.9 km^{2})
  - Water: 0.62 sq mi (1.6 km^{2})
- Elevation: 768 ft (234 m)

Population (2020)
  - Total: 496
  - Density: 17.6/sq mi (6.80/km^{2})
- Time zone: UTC-5 (Eastern (EST))
  - Summer (DST): UTC-4 (EDT)
- FIPS code: 39-46536
- GNIS feature ID: 1086725

Madison Township is one of the twenty-five townships of Muskingum County, Ohio, United States. The 2020 census found 496 people in the township.

== Geography ==
Located in the northern part of the county, it borders the following townships:

- Adams Township - northeast
- Salem Township - southeast
- Washington Township - south
- Muskingum Township - southwest
- Jefferson Township - west
- Cass Township - northwest

No municipalities are located in Madison Township.

== Name and history ==
It is one of twenty Madison Townships statewide.

In 1833, Madison Township had one saw mill, one flouring mill, one salt factory, one physician, one attorney, and several ancient mounds.

== Government ==
The township is governed by a three-member board of trustees, who are elected in November of odd-numbered years to a four-year term beginning on the following January 1. Two are elected in the year after the presidential election and one is elected in the year before it. There is also an elected township fiscal officer, who serves a four-year term beginning on April 1 of the year after the election, which is held in November of the year before the presidential election. Vacancies in the fiscal officership or on the board of trustees are filled by the remaining trustees.
