= Barnett–Criss House =

Historic house in Ohio, United States

- U.S. National Register of Historic Places
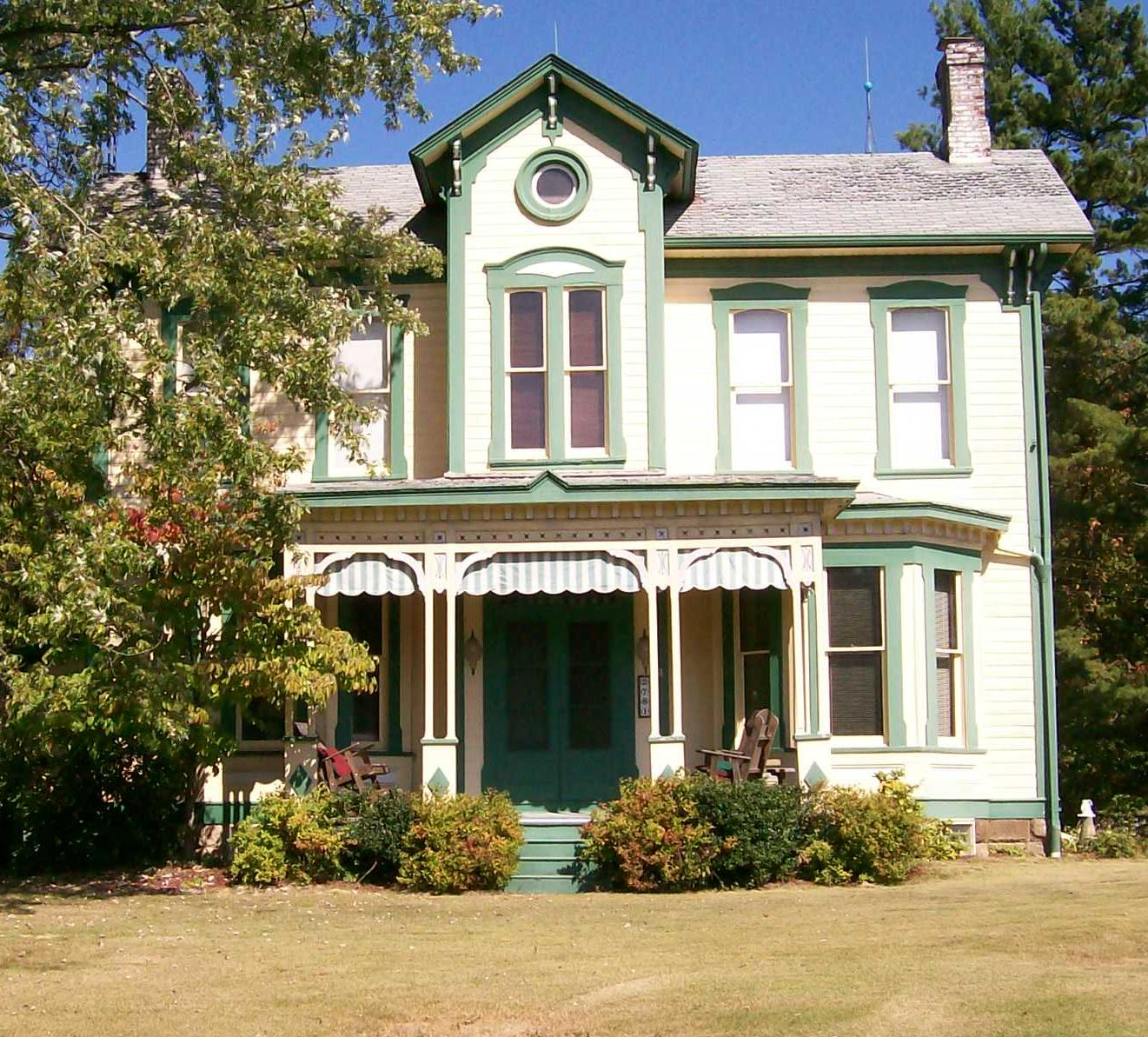
- The Barnett Criss House on Best Road outside of New Concord, Ohio

- Location within Ohio Location within the United States
- Location: SW of Cambridge off U.S. 22, Cambridge, Ohio
- Coordinates: 39°59′59″N 81°41′33″W
- Area: 1 acre (0.40 ha)
- Built: 1875
- Architect: John & Charles Halstead
- Architectural style: Italianate
- NRHP reference No.: 78002070
- Added to NRHP: December 8, 1978

The Barnett–Criss House is an Italianate style house constructed on the much traveled National Road a few miles east of New Concord, Ohio. The house was placed on the National Register on 1978-12-08.

== History ==
Born in Westland Township, Oliver Barnett made himself one of the area's most important farmers following service in the Union Army during the Civil War. He and his wife arranged for the construction of the house in 1875, relying on contractors from Pittsburgh. Here they lived for fifteen years before selling the property to Elijah and Carrie Criss, another well-known farming couple.

== Exterior ==
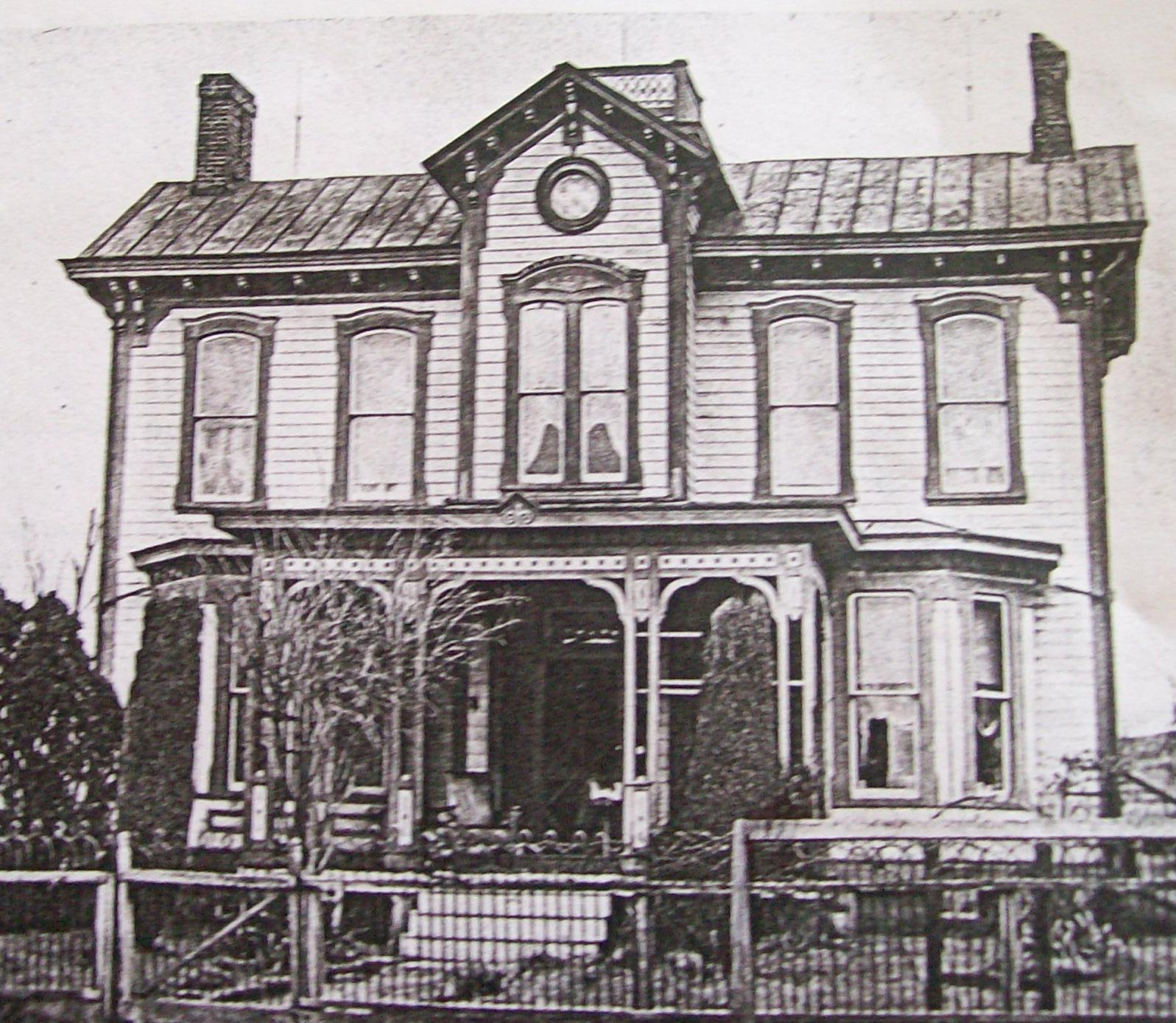
The Barnett–Criss House around the late 1800s

The rectangular house sits on top of a sandstone basement with water table separating house from basement. The house facade is lined with wooden siding. The front of the house is accentuated by a front porch containing slender posts on broad bases. The posts are decorated with trusses reaching from each post to make an arch. The large front double-doors are capped by a transom window. The porch is framed to either side by a bay window.

The second floor is accentuated by a central tower with a decorative double window with a porthole window above it. The tower is capped by a gabled roof with decorative brackets and entablature. To either side of the tower are a pair of windows. The sloping roof is punctured to either end by a brick chimney.

The side of the house contained an open porch with a water pump. The porch was covered over into a sunroom sometime around 1900.

== Interior ==
The main entrance at the front of the house opens up into the central hall with a staircase leading to the second-floor bedrooms. To the left of the hall is the parlor which contains an original brass gas chandelier with springs and a pulley for easier maintenance. A fireplace with decorative carved wooden panels add a touch of sophistication.

The parlor once opened up onto another open porch with a necessary located nearby. The porch was covered over and was split into a study and a bathroom. This room opens up into the large kitchen. A large cooking fireplace graces the center of the outside wall with a food pantry to its right. This pantry is said to be designed by a specialist who could maintain a consistent cool temperature. The kitchen opens up onto the central hall or continues into the dining room or sunporch.

The dining room contains a fireplace much like the one in the parlor. The bay window at one end of the room was used as a tea area. The doors throughout the house are framed by oak frames with a frosted levered window. The doors are all hung on decorative iron hinges.
