= Franklin Township, Coshocton County, Ohio =

Township in Ohio, US

- Township
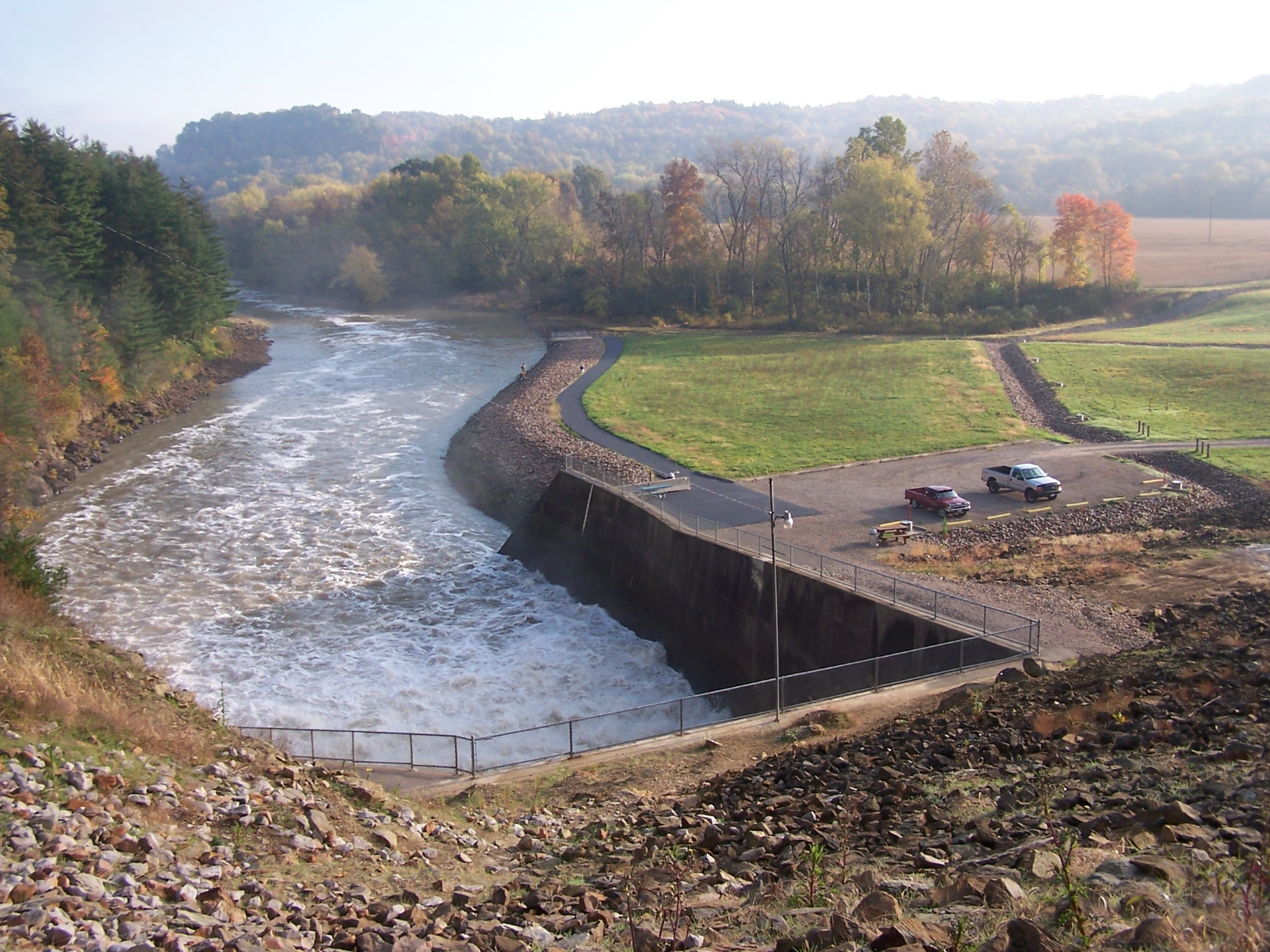
- Wills Creek flowing out of Wills Creek Lake

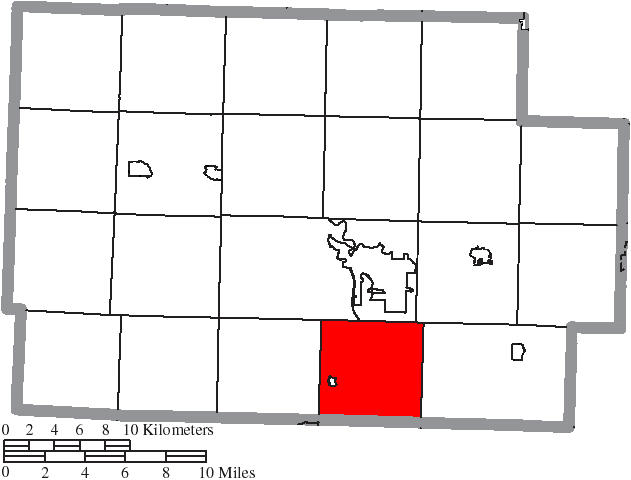
- Location of Franklin Township in Coshocton County
- Coordinates: 40°11′20″N 81°52′33″W
- Country: United States
- State: Ohio
- County: Coshocton

Area
  - Total: 25.1 sq mi (64.9 km^{2})
  - Land: 24.4 sq mi (63.1 km^{2})
  - Water: 0.69 sq mi (1.8 km^{2})
- Elevation: 774 ft (236 m)

Population (2020)
  - Total: 1,165
  - Density: 47.8/sq mi (18.5/km^{2})
- Time zone: UTC-5 (Eastern (EST))
  - Summer (DST): UTC-4 (EDT)
- FIPS code: 39-28252
- GNIS feature ID: 1085915

Franklin Township is one of the twenty-two townships of Coshocton County, Ohio, United States. The 2020 census reported 1,165 people living in the township.

== Geography ==
Located in the southern part of the county, it borders the following townships:

- Tuscarawas Township - north
- Lafayette Township - northeast
- Linton Township - east
- Monroe Township, Muskingum County - southeast corner
- Adams Township, Muskingum County - south
- Cass Township, Muskingum County - southwest
- Virginia Township - west
- Jackson Township - northwest

The village of Conesville is located in western Franklin Township.

== Name and history ==
Franklin Township was organized in 1814.

It is one of twenty-one Franklin Townships statewide.

== Government ==
The township is governed by a three-member board of trustees, who are elected in November of odd-numbered years to a four-year term beginning on the following January 1. Two are elected in the year after the presidential election and one is elected in the year before it. There is also an elected township fiscal officer, who serves a four-year term beginning on April 1 of the year after the election, which is held in November of the year before the presidential election. Vacancies in the fiscal officership or on the board of trustees are filled by the remaining trustees.
