= Salt Creek Township, Muskingum County, Ohio =

Township in Ohio, US

- Township
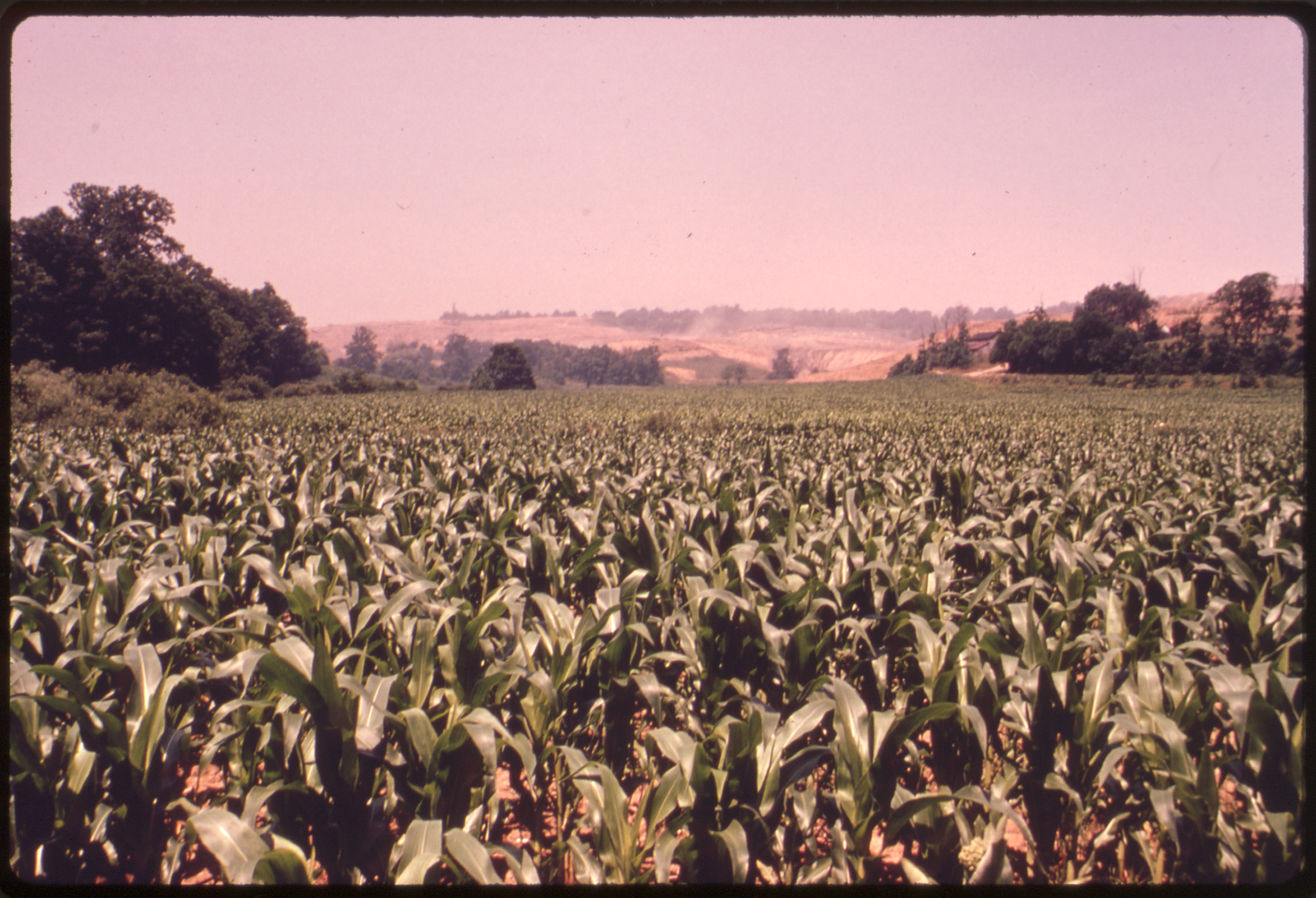
- Fields outside Chandlersville

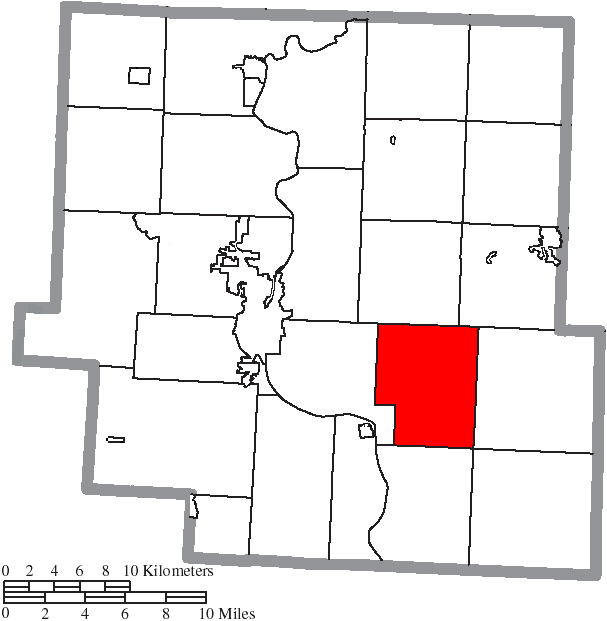
- Location of Salt Creek Township in Muskingum County
- Coordinates: 39°54′13″N 81°51′22″W
- Country: United States
- State: Ohio
- County: Muskingum

Area
  - Total: 27.9 sq mi (72.3 km^{2})
  - Land: 27.9 sq mi (72.3 km^{2})
  - Water: 0 sq mi (0.0 km^{2})
- Elevation: 712 ft (217 m)

Population (2020)
  - Total: 1,153
  - Density: 41.3/sq mi (15.9/km^{2})
- Time zone: UTC-5 (Eastern (EST))
  - Summer (DST): UTC-4 (EDT)
- FIPS code: 39-70170
- GNIS feature ID: 1086733

Salt Creek Township is one of the twenty-five townships of Muskingum County, Ohio, United States. The 2020 census found 1,153 people in the township.

== Geography ==
Located in the southeastern part of the county, it borders the following townships:

- Perry Township - north
- Union Township - northeast
- Rich Hill Township - east
- Meigs Township - southeast corner
- Blue Rock Township - south
- Wayne Township - west

No municipalities are located in Salt Creek Township, although the unincorporated community of Chandlersville lies in the western part of the township.

== Name and history ==
Salt Creek Township was named after its Salt Creek. It is one of five Salt Creek Townships statewide.

By the 1830s, Salt Creek Township had several mills and salt factories, and two churches.

== Government ==
The township is governed by a three-member board of trustees, who are elected in November of odd-numbered years to a four-year term beginning on the following January 1. Two are elected in the year after the presidential election and one is elected in the year before it. There is also an elected township fiscal officer, who serves a four-year term beginning on April 1 of the year after the election, which is held in November of the year before the presidential election. Vacancies in the fiscal officership or on the board of trustees are filled by the remaining trustees.
