= Richhill =

Richhill is the name of a number of places:

- Richhill, County Armagh, Northern Ireland
- Richhill Township, Pennsylvania, United States
- Rich Hill (disambiguation)
