= Knox Township, Guernsey County, Ohio =

Township in Ohio, US

- Township
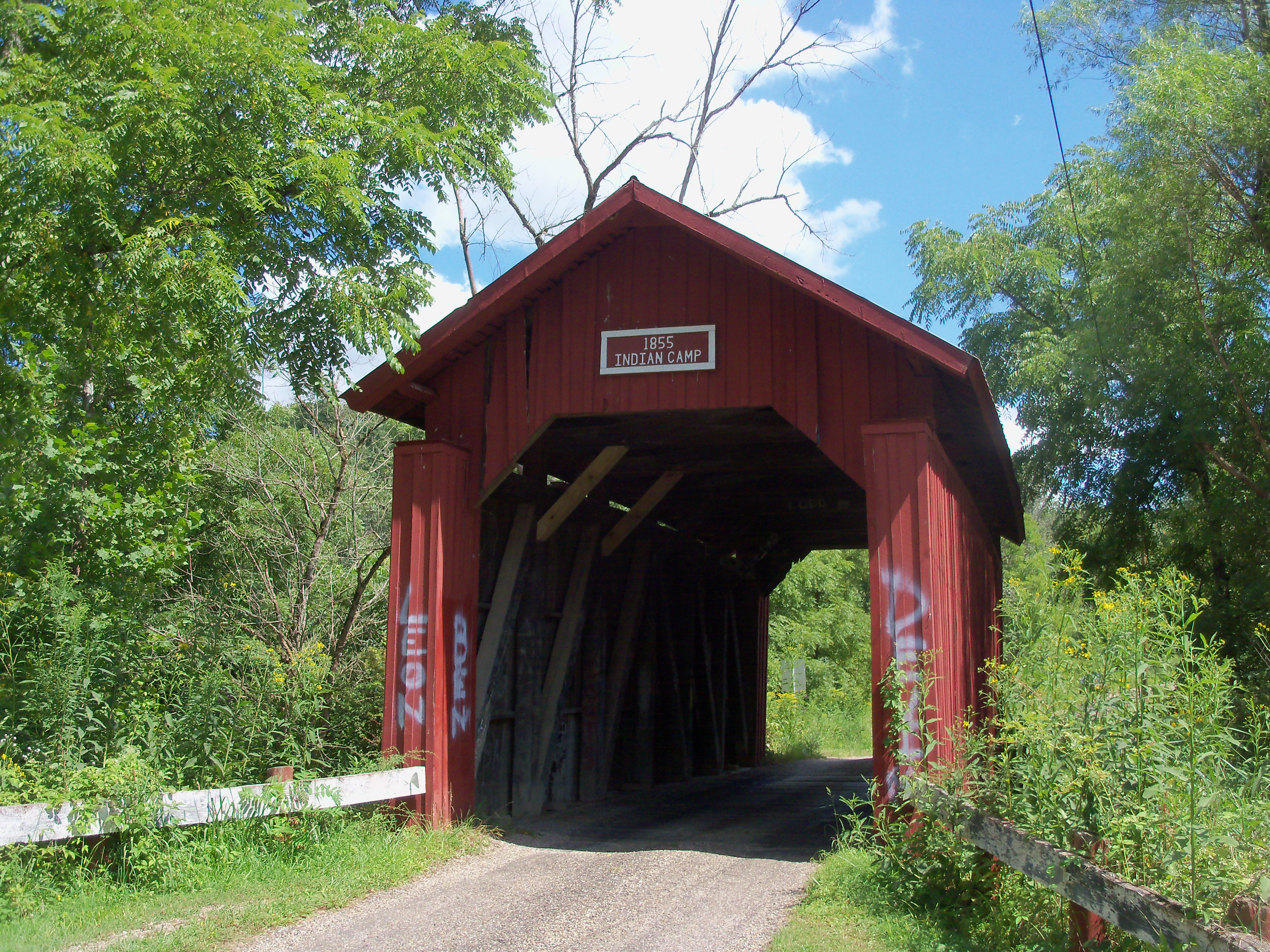
- covered bridge over Indian Camp Run

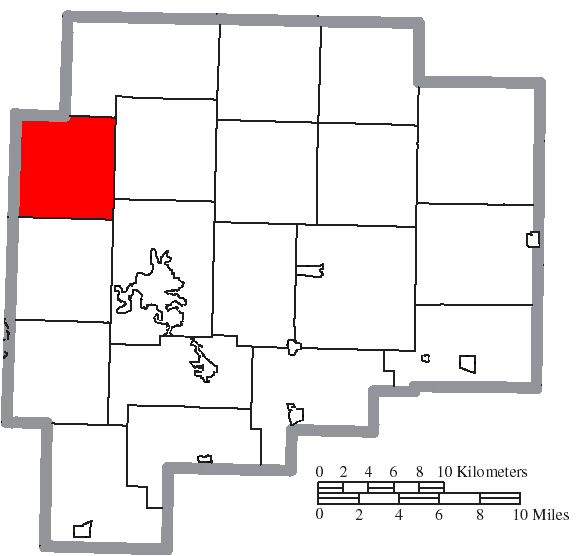
- Location of Knox Township in Guernsey County
- Coordinates: 40°7′4″N 81°40′26″W
- Country: United States
- State: Ohio
- County: Guernsey

Area
  - Total: 25.02 sq mi (64.81 km^{2})
  - Land: 25.02 sq mi (64.80 km^{2})
  - Water: 0.0039 sq mi (0.01 km^{2})
- Elevation: 1,040 ft (317 m)

Population (2020)
  - Total: 538
  - Density: 21.5/sq mi (8.30/km^{2})
- Time zone: UTC-5 (Eastern (EST))
  - Summer (DST): UTC-4 (EDT)
- FIPS code: 39-40838
- GNIS feature ID: 1086182

Knox Township is one of the nineteen townships of Guernsey County, Ohio, United States. As of the 2020 census the population was 538.

== Geography ==
Located in the northwestern part of the county, it borders the following townships:

- Wheeling Township - northeast
- Liberty Township - east
- Cambridge Township - southeast
- Adams Township - south
- Highland Township, Muskingum County - southwest corner
- Monroe Township, Muskingum County - west
- Linton Township, Coshocton County - northwest

No municipalities are located in Knox Township.

== Name and history ==
Knox Township was established in 1819. It is one of five Knox Townships statewide.

== Government ==
The township is governed by a three-member board of trustees, who are elected in November of odd-numbered years to a four-year term beginning on the following January 1. Two are elected in the year after the presidential election and one is elected in the year before it. There is also an elected township fiscal officer, who serves a four-year term beginning on April 1 of the year after the election, which is held in November of the year before the presidential election. Vacancies in the fiscal officership or on the board of trustees are filled by the remaining trustees.
