= Union Township, Muskingum County, Ohio =

Township in Ohio, US

- Township
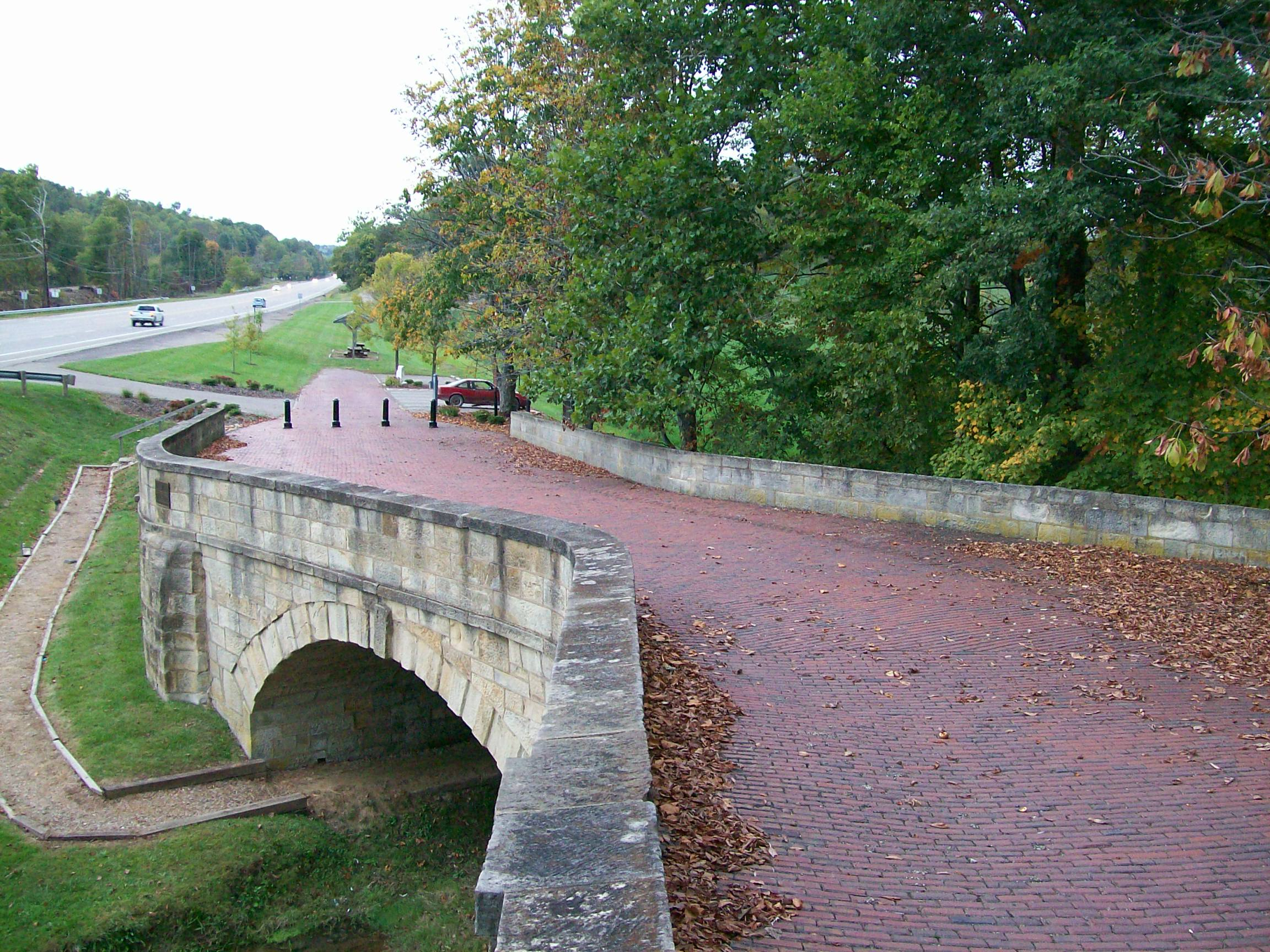
- S bridge on the National Road

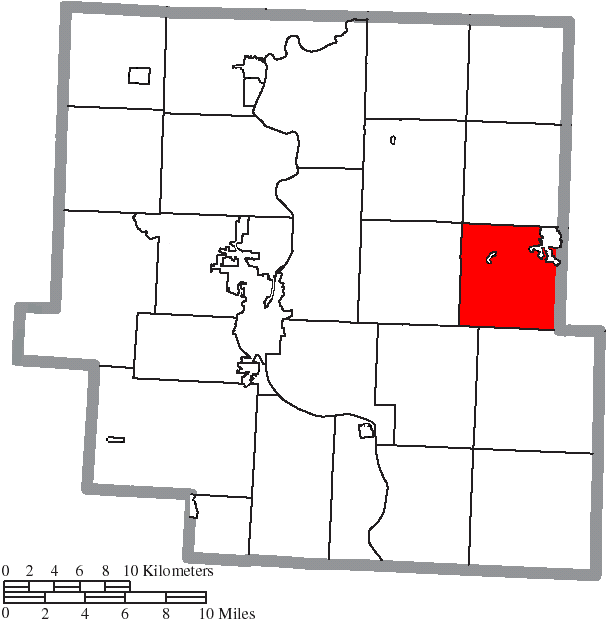
- Location of Union Township in Muskingum County
- Coordinates: 39°59′5″N 81°45′28″W
- Country: United States
- State: Ohio
- County: Muskingum

Area
  - Total: 25.4 sq mi (65.9 km^{2})
  - Land: 25.4 sq mi (65.9 km^{2})
  - Water: 0 sq mi (0.0 km^{2})
- Elevation: 965 ft (294 m)

Population (2020)
  - Total: 4,265
  - Density: 168/sq mi (64.7/km^{2})
- Time zone: UTC-5 (Eastern (EST))
  - Summer (DST): UTC-4 (EDT)
- FIPS code: 39-78498
- GNIS feature ID: 1086735

Union Township is one of the twenty-five townships of Muskingum County, Ohio, United States. The 2020 census found 4,265 people in the township.

== Geography ==
Located on the eastern edge of the county, it borders the following townships:

- Highland Township - north
- Adams Township, Guernsey County - northeast corner
- Westland Township, Guernsey County - east
- Rich Hill Township - south
- Salt Creek Township - southwest
- Perry Township - west
- Salem Township - northwest corner

Two incorporated villages are located in Union Township: New Concord in the northeast, and Norwich in the northwest.

== Name and history ==
It is one of twenty-seven Union Townships statewide.

In 1833, Union Township contained two post offices, four churches, one saw mill, and two physicians.

== Government ==
The township is governed by a three-member board of trustees, who are elected in November of odd-numbered years to a four-year term beginning on the following January 1. Two are elected in the year after the presidential election and one is elected in the year before it. There is also an elected township fiscal officer, who serves a four-year term beginning on April 1 of the year after the election, which is held in November of the year before the presidential election. Vacancies in the fiscal officership or on the board of trustees are filled by the remaining trustees.
