= Knox Township, Ohio =

Knox Township, Ohio, may refer to:

- Knox Township, Columbiana County, Ohio
- Knox Township, Guernsey County, Ohio
- Knox Township, Holmes County, Ohio
- Knox Township, Jefferson County, Ohio
- Knox Township, Vinton County, Ohio
