= Richard Hills =

Richard Hills may refer to:

- Richard Hills (cricketer) (born 1951), former English cricketer
- Richard Hills (jockey) (born 1963), retired flat racing jockey
- Richard Hills (politician) (born 1985/86), New Zealand politician on Auckland Council
- Richard L. Hills (1936–2019), English historian
- Richard Edwin Hills (1945–2022), British astronomer and professor of radio astronomy
- Dick Hills (1926–1996), British comedy writer, see Dick Hills and Sid Green

== See also ==
- Richard Hill (disambiguation)
