= Cambridge Township, Ohio =

Township in Ohio, US

- Township
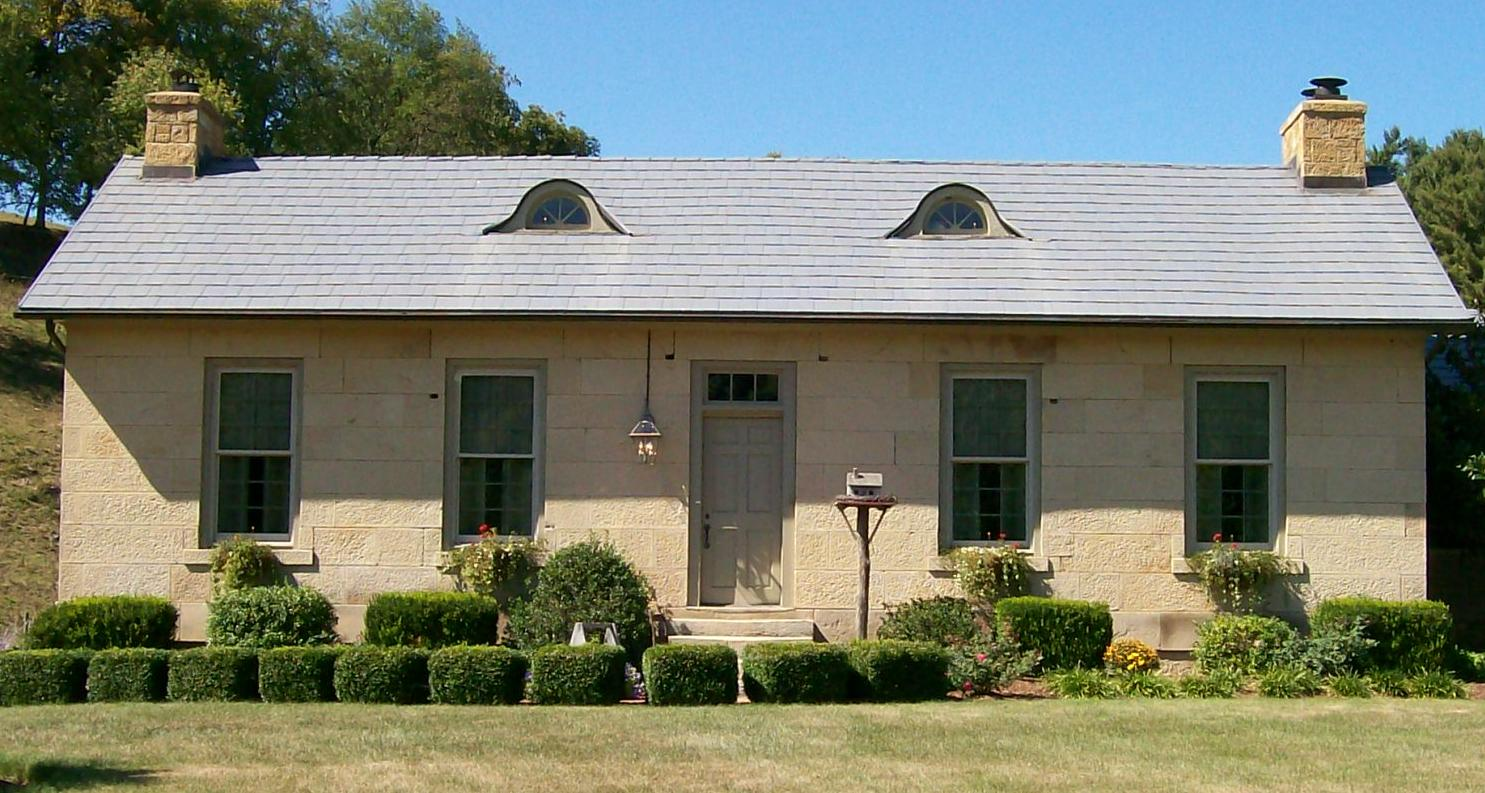
- The Broom-Braden Stone House, a historic site in the township

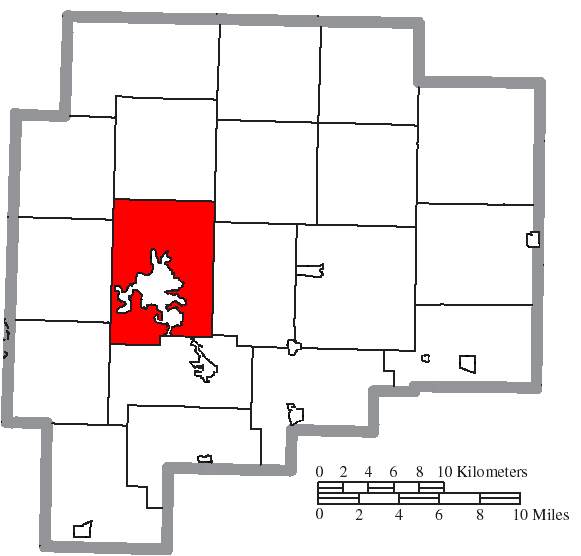
- Location of Cambridge Township in Guernsey County
- Coordinates: 40°1′35″N 81°35′3″W
- Country: United States
- State: Ohio
- County: Guernsey

Area
  - Total: 34.9 sq mi (90.3 km^{2})
  - Land: 34.8 sq mi (90.1 km^{2})
  - Water: 0.077 sq mi (0.2 km^{2})
- Elevation: 863 ft (263 m)

Population (2020)
  - Total: 13,900
  - Density: 400/sq mi (154/km^{2})
- Time zone: UTC-5 (Eastern (EST))
  - Summer (DST): UTC-4 (EDT)
- ZIP codes: 43725, 43750
- Area code: 740
- FIPS code: 39-11003
- GNIS feature ID: 1086178

Cambridge Township is one of the nineteen townships of Guernsey County, Ohio, United States. As of the 2020 census the population was 13,900.

== Geography ==
Located in the western part of the county, it borders the following townships:

- Liberty Township - north
- Jefferson Township - northeast
- Center Township - east
- Jackson Township - south
- Westland Township - southwest
- Adams Township - west
- Knox Township - northwest

The city of Cambridge, the county seat of Guernsey County, is located in central Cambridge Township.

== Name and history ==
Cambridge Township was established in 1810. It is the only Cambridge Township statewide.

== Government ==
The township is governed by a three-member board of trustees, who are elected in November of odd-numbered years to a four-year term beginning on the following January 1. Two are elected in the year after the presidential election and one is elected in the year before it. There is also an elected township fiscal officer, who serves a four-year term beginning on April 1 of the year after the election, which is held in November of the year before the presidential election. Vacancies in the fiscal officership or on the board of trustees are filled by the remaining trustees.
