= Westland Township, Guernsey County, Ohio =

Township in Ohio, US

- Township
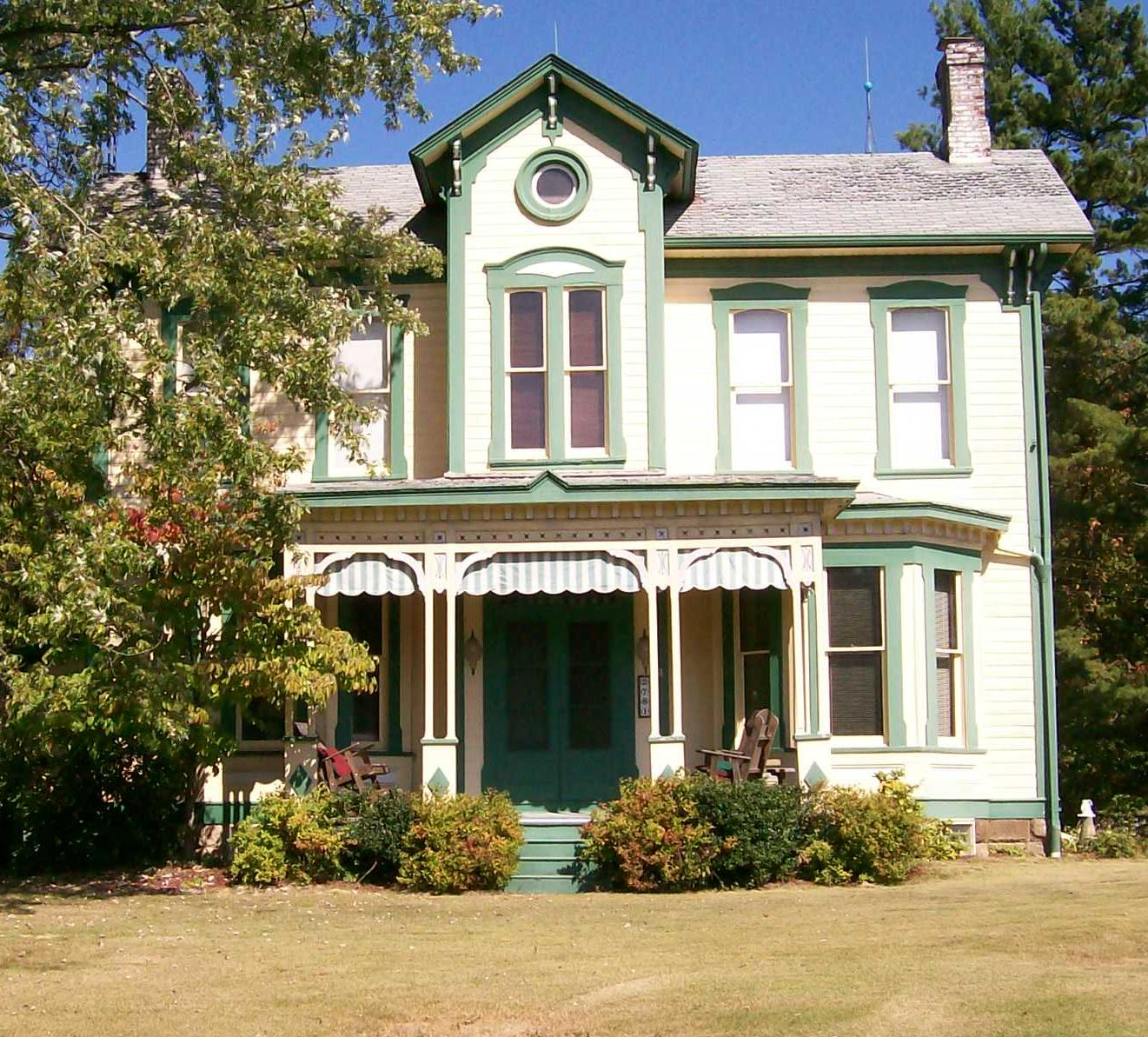
- Barnett-Criss House, built 1875

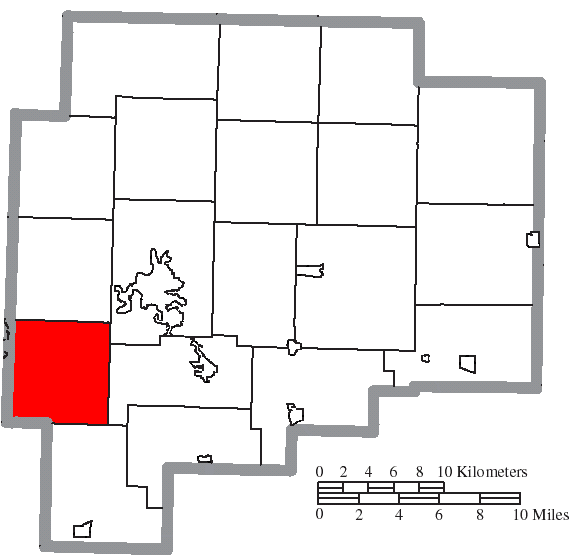
- Location of Westland Township in Guernsey County
- Coordinates: 39°58′25″N 81°41′4″W
- Country: United States
- State: Ohio
- County: Guernsey

Area
  - Total: 25.4 sq mi (65.7 km^{2})
  - Land: 25.3 sq mi (65.5 km^{2})
  - Water: 0.077 sq mi (0.2 km^{2})
- Elevation: 915 ft (279 m)

Population (2020)
  - Total: 2,157
  - Density: 85.3/sq mi (32.9/km^{2})
- Time zone: UTC-5 (Eastern (EST))
  - Summer (DST): UTC-4 (EDT)
- FIPS code: 39-83664
- GNIS feature ID: 1086193

Westland Township is one of the nineteen townships of Guernsey County, Ohio, United States. As of the 2020 census the population was 2,157.

== Geography ==
Located in the southwestern part of the county, it borders the following townships:

- Adams Township - north
- Cambridge Township - northeast
- Jackson Township - east
- Spencer Township - southeast
- Rich Hill Township, Muskingum County - southwest
- Union Township, Muskingum County - west
- Highland Township, Muskingum County - northwest corner

No municipalities are located in Westland Township.

== Name and history ==
Westland Township was established in 1810. It is the only Westland Township statewide.

== Government ==
The township is governed by a three-member board of trustees, who are elected in November of odd-numbered years to a four-year term beginning on the following January 1. Two are elected in the year after the presidential election and one is elected in the year before it. There is also an elected township fiscal officer, who serves a four-year term beginning on April 1 of the year after the election, which is held in November of the year before the presidential election. Vacancies in the fiscal officership or on the board of trustees are filled by the remaining trustees.
