= Monroe Township, Muskingum County, Ohio =

Township in Ohio, US

- Township
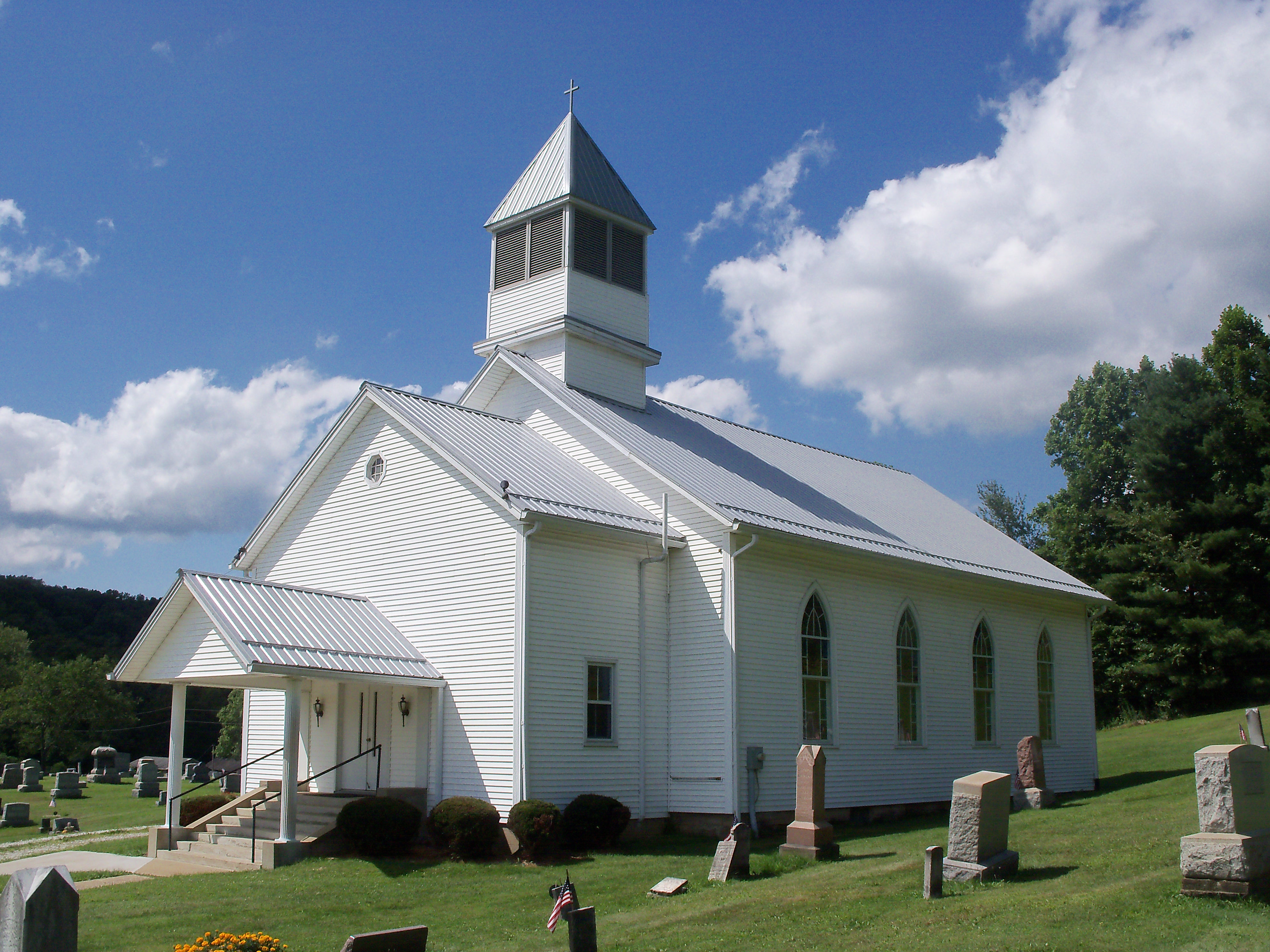
- Otsego United Methodist Church

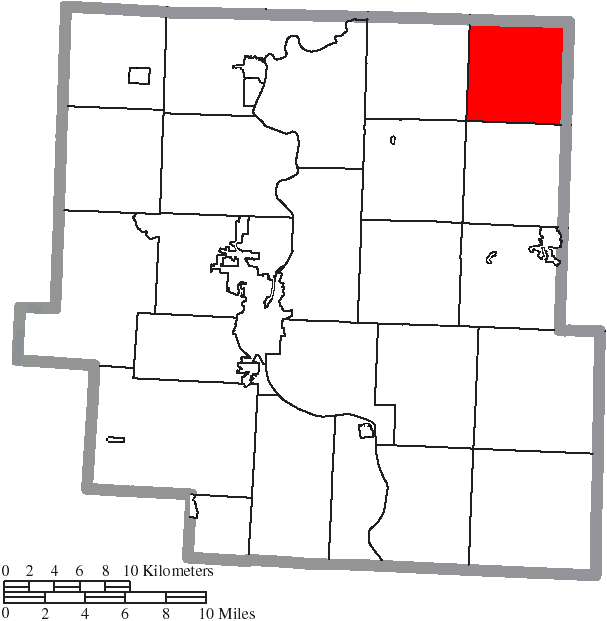
- Location of Monroe Township in Muskingum County
- Coordinates: 40°6′54″N 81°46′5″W
- Country: United States
- State: Ohio
- County: Muskingum

Area
  - Total: 24.9 sq mi (64.6 km^{2})
  - Land: 24.7 sq mi (64.0 km^{2})
  - Water: 0.19 sq mi (0.5 km^{2})
- Elevation: 801 ft (244 m)

Population (2020)
  - Total: 521
  - Density: 21.1/sq mi (8.14/km^{2})
- Time zone: UTC-5 (Eastern (EST))
  - Summer (DST): UTC-4 (EDT)
- FIPS code: 39-51506
- GNIS feature ID: 1086727

Monroe Township is one of the twenty-five townships of Muskingum County, Ohio, United States. The 2020 census found 521 people in the township.

== Geography ==
Located in the northeastern corner of the county, it borders the following townships:

- Linton Township, Coshocton County - north
- Knox Township, Guernsey County - east
- Adams Township, Guernsey County - southeast corner
- Highland Township - south
- Salem Township - southwest corner
- Adams Township - west
- Franklin Township, Coshocton County - northwest corner

No municipalities are located in Monroe Township. The unincorporated community Otsego is home to the township hall.

== Name and history ==
Monroe Township was named for James Monroe, 5th President of the United States. It is one of twenty-two Monroe Townships statewide.

By the 1830s, Monroe Township contained three saw mills and three gristmills.

== Government ==
The township is governed by a three-member board of trustees, who are elected in November of odd-numbered years to a four-year term beginning on the following January 1. Two are elected in the year after the presidential election and one is elected in the year before it. There is also an elected township fiscal officer, who serves a four-year term beginning on April 1 of the year after the election, which is held in November of the year before the presidential election. Vacancies in the fiscal officership or on the board of trustees are filled by the remaining trustees.
