= Linton Township, Coshocton County, Ohio =

Township in Ohio, US

- Township
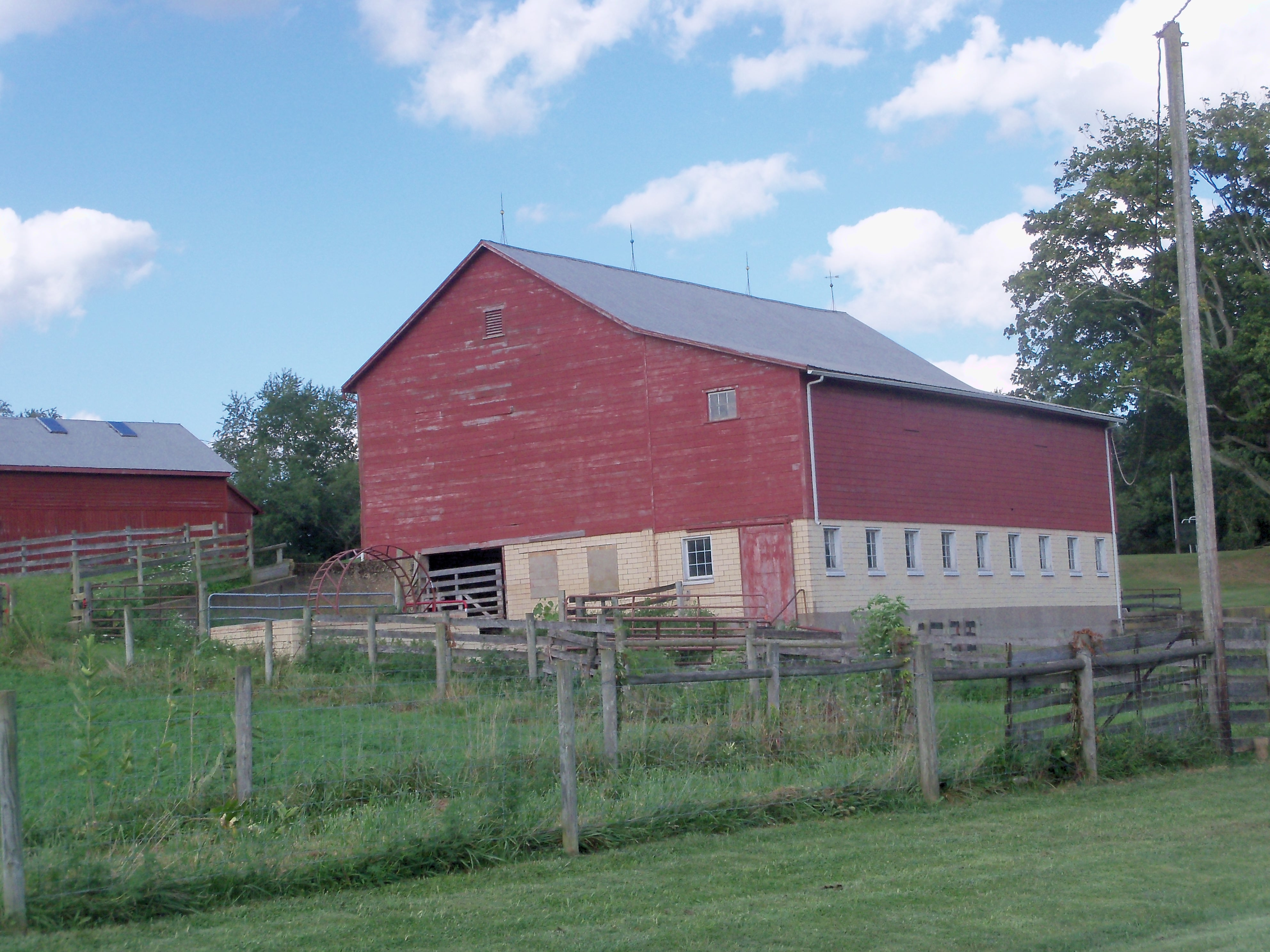
- A farm building on Route 541

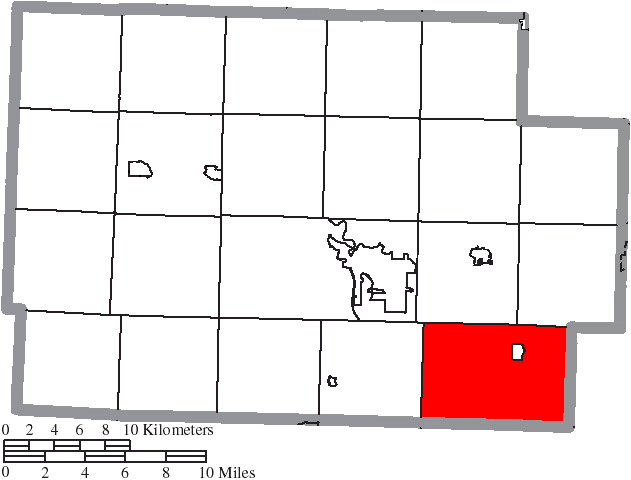
- Location of Linton Township in Coshocton County
- Coordinates: 40°11′40″N 81°43′42″W
- Country: United States
- State: Ohio
- County: Coshocton

Area
  - Total: 36.5 sq mi (94.5 km^{2})
  - Land: 36.1 sq mi (93.4 km^{2})
  - Water: 0.39 sq mi (1.0 km^{2})
- Elevation: 790 ft (240 m)

Population (2020)
  - Total: 626
  - Density: 17.4/sq mi (6.70/km^{2})
- Time zone: UTC-5 (Eastern (EST))
  - Summer (DST): UTC-4 (EDT)
- FIPS code: 39-43960
- GNIS feature ID: 1085920

Linton Township is one of the twenty-two townships of Coshocton County, Ohio, United States. The 2020 census reported 626 people living in the township.

== Geography ==
Located in the southeastern corner of the county, it borders the following townships:

- Oxford Township - northeast
- Wheeling Township, Guernsey County - east
- Knox Township, Guernsey County - southeast
- Monroe Township, Muskingum County - south
- Adams Township, Muskingum County - southwest corner
- Franklin Township - west
- Lafayette Township - northwest

The village of Plainfield is located in northeastern Linton Township. Linton Township contains the unincorporated community of Bacon.

== Name and history ==
Linton Township was organized in 1812.

It is the only Linton Township statewide.

== Government ==
The township is governed by a three-member board of trustees, who are elected in November of odd-numbered years to a four-year term beginning on the following January 1. Two are elected in the year after the presidential election and one is elected in the year before it. There is also an elected township fiscal officer, who serves a four-year term beginning on April 1 of the year after the election, which is held in November of the year before the presidential election. Vacancies in the fiscal officership or on the board of trustees are filled by the remaining trustees.
