= Adams Township, Ohio =

Adams Township, Ohio, may refer to:

- Adams Township, Champaign County, Ohio
- Adams Township, Clinton County, Ohio
- Adams Township, Coshocton County, Ohio
- Adams Township, Darke County, Ohio
- Adams Township, Defiance County, Ohio
- Adams Township, Guernsey County, Ohio
- Adams Township, Lucas County, Ohio, a former township entirely annexed to Toledo, Ohio
- Adams Township, Monroe County, Ohio
- Adams Township, Muskingum County, Ohio
- Adams Township, Seneca County, Ohio
- Adams Township, Washington County, Ohio
