= Adams Township, Muskingum County, Ohio =

Township in Ohio, US

- Township
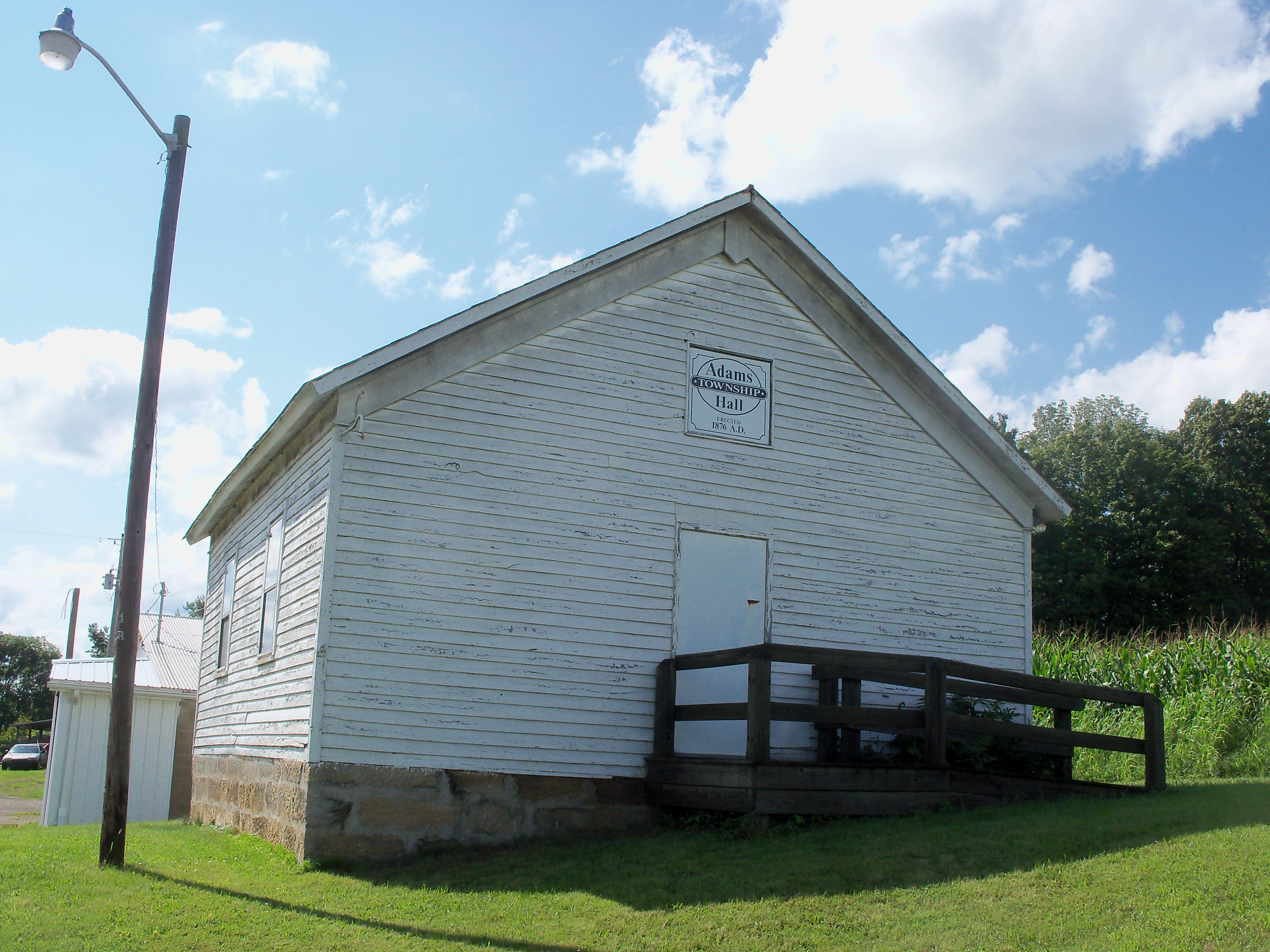
- Adams Township meeting hall, erected 1876

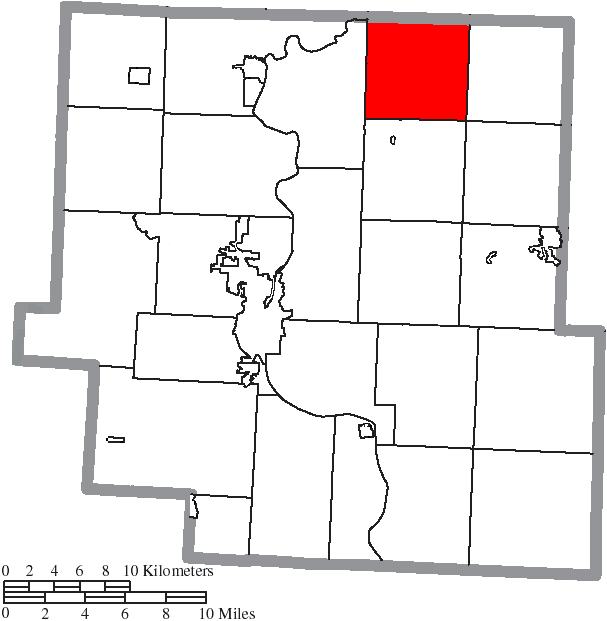
- Location of Adams Township in Muskingum County
- Coordinates: 40°7′57″N 81°51′16″W
- Country: United States
- State: Ohio
- County: Muskingum

Area
  - Total: 25.4 sq mi (65.7 km^{2})
  - Land: 25.1 sq mi (64.9 km^{2})
  - Water: 0.31 sq mi (0.8 km^{2})
- Elevation: 1,004 ft (306 m)

Population (2020)
  - Total: 619
  - Density: 24.7/sq mi (9.54/km^{2})
- Time zone: UTC-5 (Eastern (EST))
  - Summer (DST): UTC-4 (EDT)
- FIPS code: 39-00310
- GNIS feature ID: 1086713

Adams Township is one of the twenty-five townships of Muskingum County, Ohio, United States. The 2020 census found 619 people in the township.

== Geography ==
Located on the northern edge of the county, it borders the following townships:

- Franklin Township, Coshocton County - north
- Linton Township, Coshocton County - northeast corner
- Monroe Township - east
- Highland Township - southeast corner
- Salem Township - south
- Madison Township - west
- Cass Township - northwest, south of Virginia Township
- Virginia Township, Coshocton County - northwest corner

No municipalities are located in Adams Township.

== Name and history ==
Adams Township was named for John Quincy Adams, 6th President of the United States. It is one of ten Adams Townships statewide.

By the 1830s, Adams Township had two mills and a church.

== Government ==
The township is governed by a three-member board of trustees, who are elected in November of odd-numbered years to a four-year term beginning on the following January 1. Two are elected in the year after the presidential election and one is elected in the year before it. There is also an elected township fiscal officer, who serves a four-year term beginning on April 1 of the year after the election, which is held in November of the year before the presidential election. Vacancies in the fiscal officership or on the board of trustees are filled by the remaining trustees.
