= Washington Township, Muskingum County, Ohio =

Township in Ohio, US

- Township
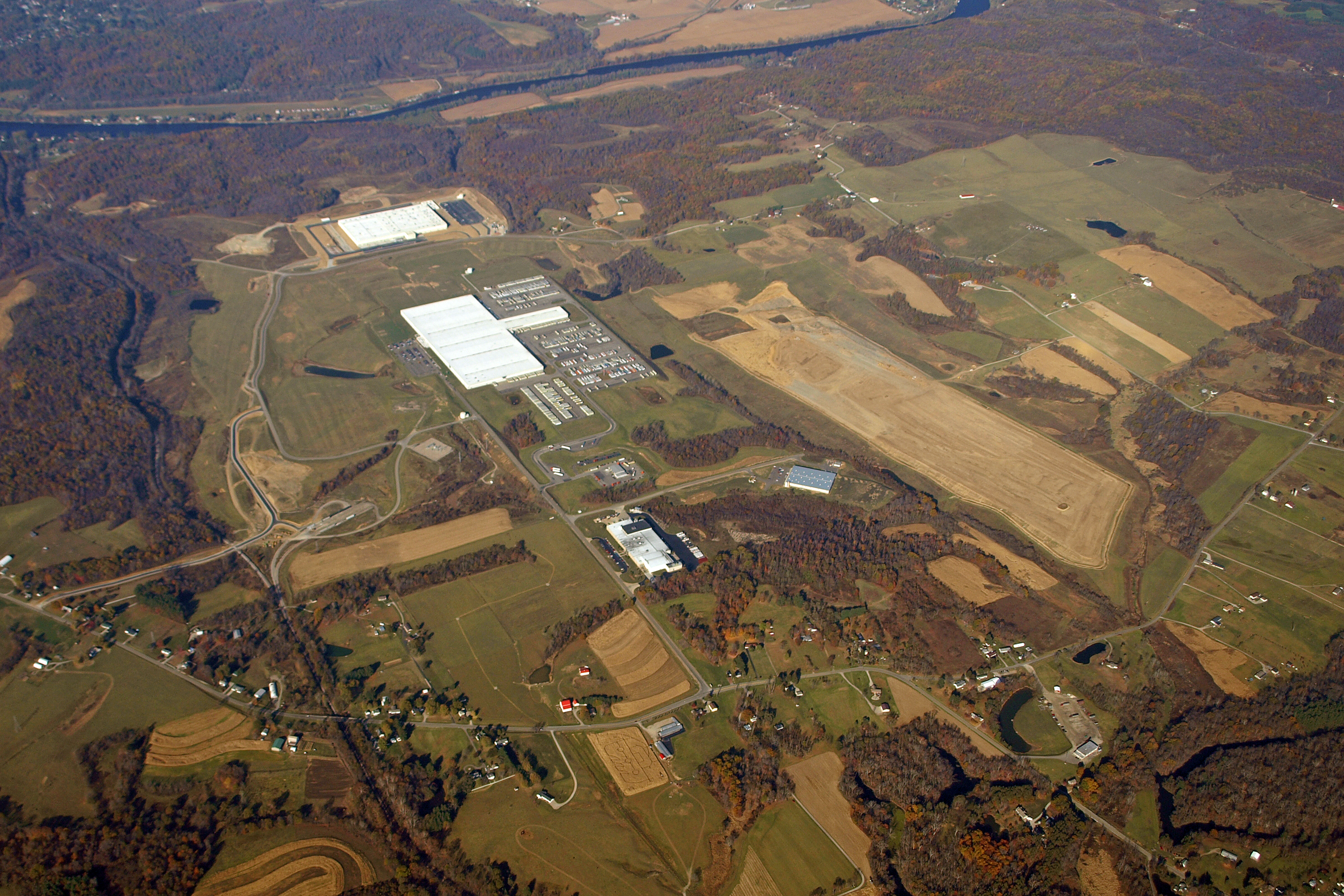
- Countryside northeast of Zanesville

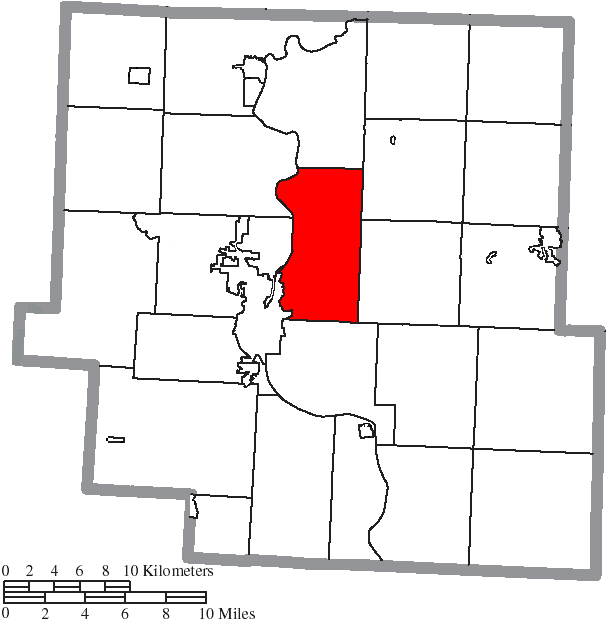
- Location of Washington Township in Muskingum County
- Coordinates: 39°58′54″N 81°57′28″W
- Country: United States
- State: Ohio
- County: Muskingum

Area
  - Total: 27.8 sq mi (71.9 km^{2})
  - Land: 27.3 sq mi (70.7 km^{2})
  - Water: 0.46 sq mi (1.2 km^{2})
- Elevation: 873 ft (266 m)

Population (2020)
  - Total: 4,097
  - Density: 150/sq mi (57.9/km^{2})
- Time zone: UTC-5 (Eastern (EST))
  - Summer (DST): UTC-4 (EDT)
- FIPS code: 39-81522
- GNIS feature ID: 1086736

Washington Township is one of the twenty-five townships of Muskingum County, Ohio, United States. The 2020 census found 4,097 people in the township.

== Geography ==
Located at the center of the county, it borders the following townships:

- Madison Township - north
- Salem Township - northeast
- Perry Township - east
- Wayne Township - south
- Springfield Township - southwest corner
- Falls Township - west
- Muskingum Township - northwest

No municipalities are located in Washington Township, although the census-designated place of Pleasant Grove is located in the southern part of the township.

== Name and history ==
It is one of forty-three Washington Townships statewide.

In 1833, Washington Township contained several salt factories, two saw mills, an ancient fortification, and several mounds.

== Government ==
The township is governed by a three-member board of trustees, who are elected in November of odd-numbered years to a four-year term beginning on the following January 1. Two are elected in the year after the presidential election and one is elected in the year before it. There is also an elected township fiscal officer, who serves a four-year term beginning on April 1 of the year after the election, which is held in November of the year before the presidential election. Vacancies in the fiscal officership or on the board of trustees are filled by the remaining trustees.
