= Broom-Braden Stone House =

Historic house in Ohio, United States

- U.S. National Register of Historic Places
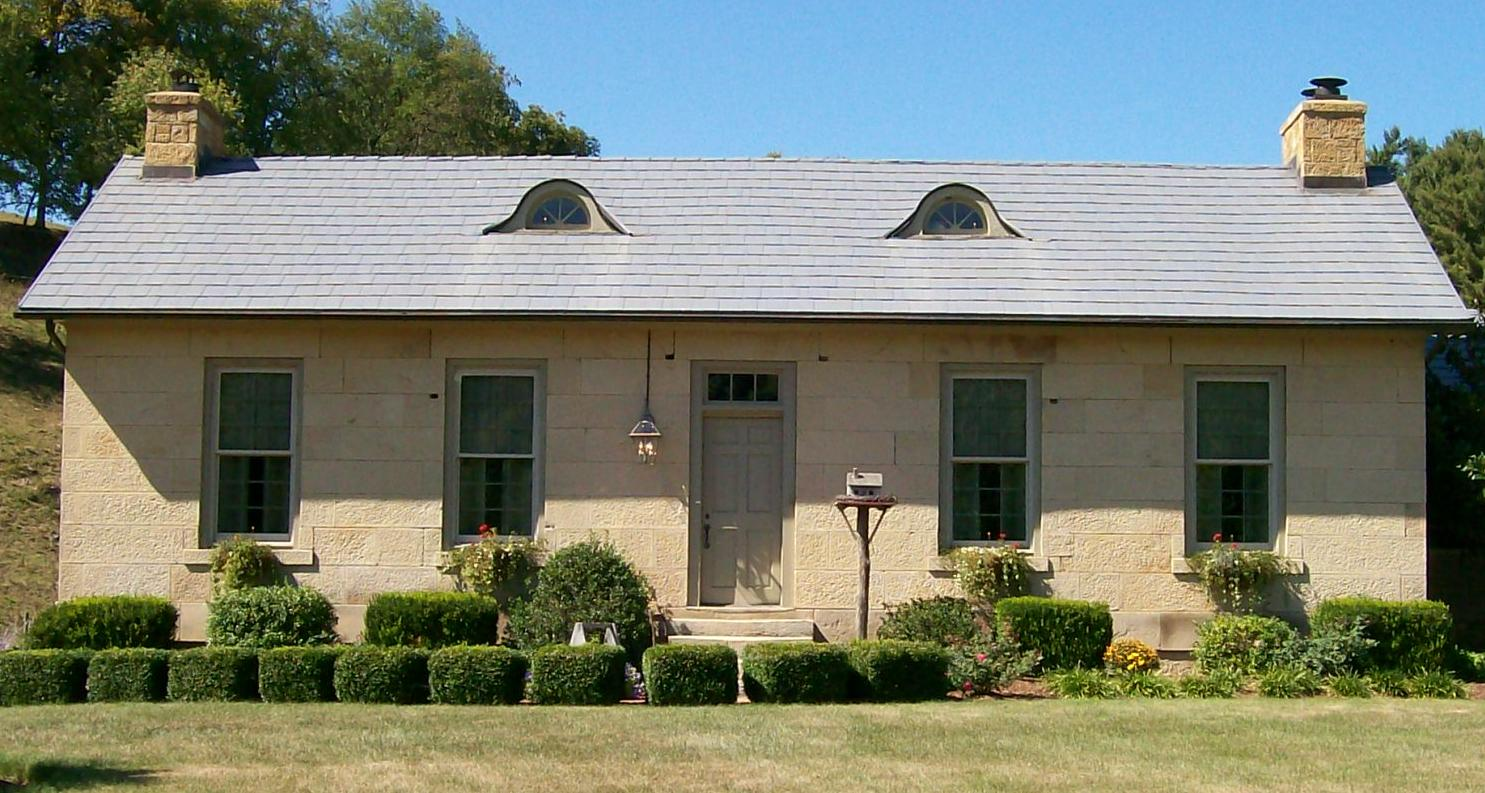
- Front of the house

- Location within Ohio Location within the United States
- Location: 66715 Reed Road, north of Cambridge, Ohio
- Coordinates: 40°4′12″N 81°33′31″W
- Area: 5 acres (2.0 ha)
- Built: 1832
- NRHP reference No.: 80003032
- Added to NRHP: July 18, 1980

The Broom-Braden Stone House is a historic residence located near the city of Cambridge in Guernsey County, Ohio, United States. Home to a prominent early citizen of the area, it is one of Guernsey County's best early houses still in existence, and it has been named a historic site.

Constructed in 1832, the Broom-Braden House was originally home to the Broom family, a leading family in the early years of Guernsey County. Hugh Broom, the paterfamilias, occupied multiple prominent places in area society. As a religious leader, he was long the pastor of the Baptist church in Cambridge, and during the 1840s, he helped to found other churches in the surrounding countryside. As a farmer, he both tilled the soil and raised livestock, and by 1840 his estate was among the area's largest, embracing 400 acres (160 ha) in Cambridge Township and additional lands in surrounding townships. In 1858, he was elected as one of Guernsey County's two state representatives.

He arranged for the construction of the present house in 1832, and detail to parts of the stonework were far more attentive than what then and currently are found. The windowsills and other parts of its façade are of careful hand-chisel work. Yet, the overall massing of the structure is unexceptional; one and a half stories tall, the house is a simple rectangle with an ordinary gabled roof. Small curved dormer windows are set within the roof, while each end of the roofline is pierced by a large chimney. Its location on sloping land causes the front and rear to sit at slightly different elevations, while the nearly windowless sides are placed along the slopes. The overall building is constructed primarily of sandstone, although brick elements are also present.

In 1980, as it approached its sesquicentenary, the Broom-Braden House was listed on the National Register of Historic Places. It qualified both because of its connection to Hugh Broom and because of its historically significant architecture, for it is one of Guernsey County's last standing early stone houses. Six agricultural outbuildings were included in the historic designation, the boundaries of which embraced 5 acres (2.0 ha).
