= Richard Hill =

Richard Hill may refer to:

== Politicians ==
- Richard Hill of Hawkstone (1655–1727), English diplomat and protector of the Vaudois
- Richard Hill (Pennsylvania politician) (died 1729), mayor of Philadelphia, Pennsylvania
- Sir Richard Hill, 2nd Baronet (1732–1808), English religious revivalist and politician
- Richard Noel-Hill, 4th Baron Berwick (1774–1848), British peer
- Richard Hill (New South Wales politician) (1810–1895), member of the New South Wales Legislative Assembly
- Richard Hill (Queensland politician) (1885–1959), member of the Queensland Legislative Assembly
- Richard Hill, 7th Baron Sandys (1931–2013), British landowner and Conservative politician
- Rick Hill (born 1946), U.S. Representative from Montana
- Richard Hill (activist) (1795–1872), mixed-race Jamaican lawyer who campaigned for the rights of free coloureds

== Sports ==
=== Association football ===
- Richard Hill (footballer, born 1893) (1893–1971), England international footballer
- Richard Hill (footballer, born 1963), former Northampton Town F.C. and Watford F.C. footballer
- Ricky Hill (born 1959), English footballer and manager

=== Rugby union ===
- Richard Hill (rugby union, born 1961), played scrum-half for Bath and England, and later coached Gloucester, Bristol, and Worcester
- Richard Hill (rugby union, born 1973), played flanker for Saracens, England and the British and Irish Lions

=== Other sports ===
- Richard Hill (runner) (born 1986), English middle-distance runner
- Richard Hill (cricketer, born 1861) (1861–1924), Somerset cricketer
- Richard Hill (cricketer, born 1900) (1900–1959)
- Dick Hill (American football) (born 1934), former American football lineman
- Richard Craig Hill (1934–2012), automobile racer

== Others ==
- Richard Hill (bishop) (died 1496), Bishop of London and Archdeacon of Lewes
- Richard Hill (priest) (1782–1836), Church of England clergyman, born in London, served in Sydney, Australia
- Richard Hill (martyr) (died 1590), Catholic priest and martyr
- Richard Hill (musician) (1942–2026), British contemporary composer
- J. Richard Hill (1929–2017), British Royal Navy rear-admiral and author
- Dick Hill (scientist), Canadian cancer researcher
- Dick Hill (narrator) (1946–2022), American audiobook narrator
- Richard Hill (RAF officer) (1899–1918), World War I flying ace
- Richard Leslie Hill (1901–1996), English civil servant and historian of Sudan
- Rick Hill (actor) (born 1953), star of the movie Deathstalker

== See also ==
- Richard Hills (disambiguation)
- Richard Burgess (murderer) (1829–1866), born Richard Hill, New Zealander known for the Maungatapu murders
- Rich Hill (disambiguation)
