= Spencer Township, Guernsey County, Ohio =

Township in Ohio, US

- Township
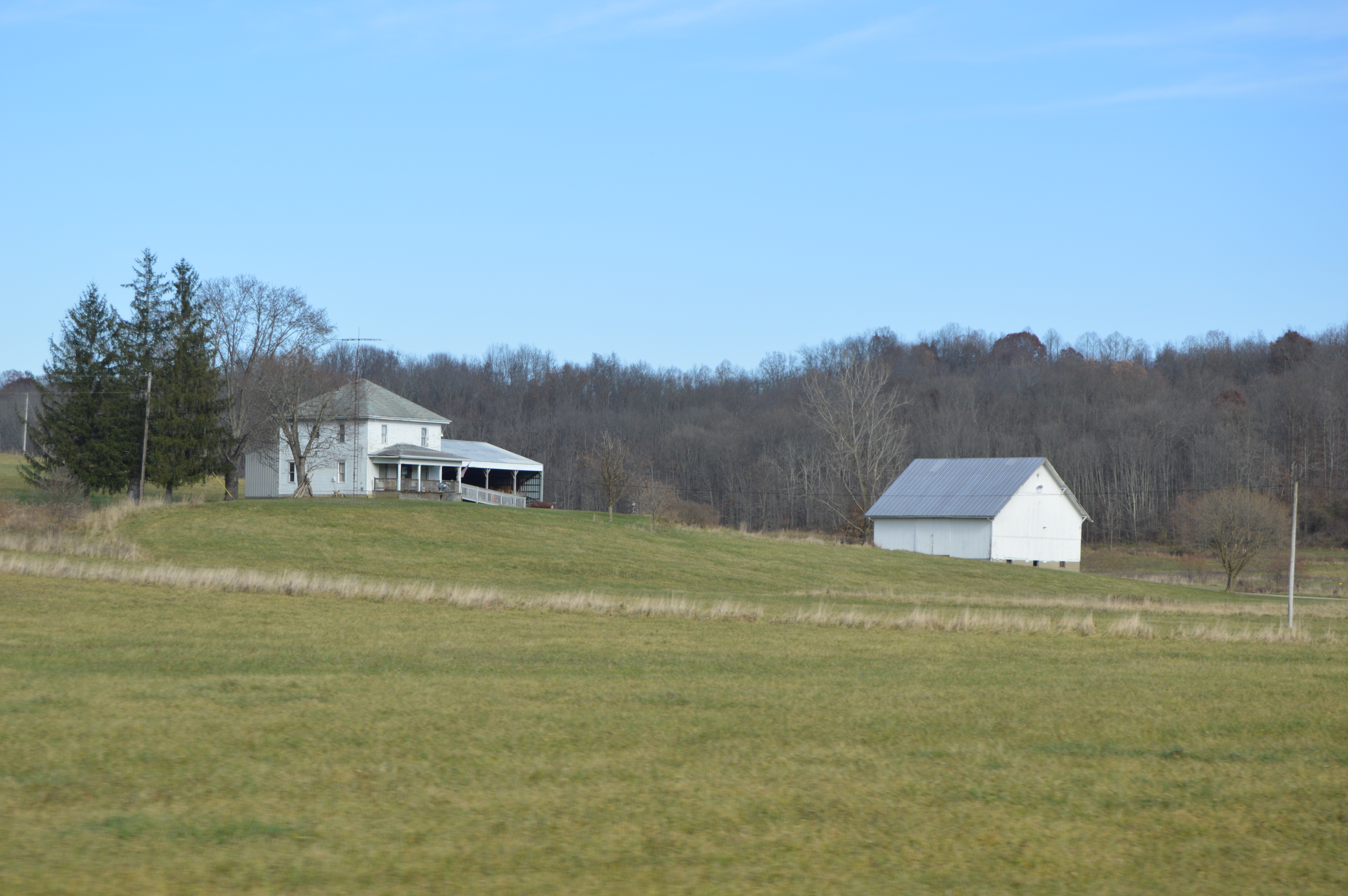
- A farmstead on State Route 146 west of Cumberland

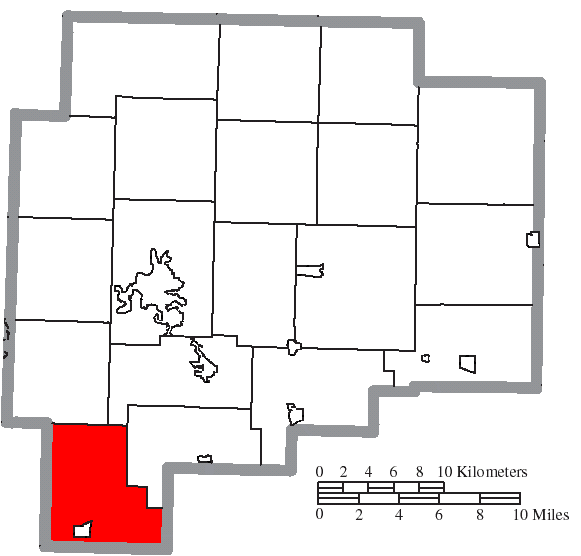
- Location of Spencer Township in Guernsey County
- Coordinates: 39°51′32″N 81°39′9″W
- Country: United States
- State: Ohio
- County: Guernsey

Area
  - Total: 29.6 sq mi (76.6 km^{2})
  - Land: 29.5 sq mi (76.5 km^{2})
  - Water: 0.039 sq mi (0.1 km^{2})
- Elevation: 902 ft (275 m)

Population (2020)
  - Total: 1,041
  - Density: 35.2/sq mi (13.6/km^{2})
- Time zone: UTC-5 (Eastern (EST))
  - Summer (DST): UTC-4 (EDT)
- FIPS code: 39-73986
- GNIS feature ID: 1086190

Spencer Township is one of the nineteen townships of Guernsey County, Ohio, United States. As of the 2020 census the population was 1,041.

== Geography ==
Located in the southwestern corner of the county, it borders the following townships:

- Westland Township - north
- Jackson Township - northeast
- Valley Township - east
- Buffalo Township, Noble County - southeast, north of Noble Township
- Noble Township, Noble County - southeast, south of Buffalo Township
- Brookfield Township, Noble County - south
- Meigs Township, Muskingum County - southwest corner
- Rich Hill Township, Muskingum County - west

The village of Cumberland is located in southern Spencer Township.

== Name and history ==
Spencer Township was organized in 1819. Statewide, other Spencer Townships are located in Allen, Lucas, and Medina counties and formerly in Hamilton County.

== Government ==
The township is governed by a three-member board of trustees, who are elected in November of odd-numbered years to a four-year term beginning on the following January 1. Two are elected in the year after the presidential election and one is elected in the year before it. There is an elected township fiscal officer, who serves a four-year term beginning on April 1 of the year after the election, which is held in November of the year before the presidential election. Vacancies in the fiscal officership or on the board of trustees are filled by the remaining trustees.
