= Bacon, Ohio =

Bacon
- Unincorporated community
- Location within the state of Ohio
- Coordinates: 40°13′15″N 81°46′31″W
- Country: United States
- State: Ohio
- County: Coshocton
- Elevation: 820 ft (250 m)
- Time zone: UTC-5 (Eastern (EST))
  - Summer (DST): UTC-4 (EDT)
- GNIS feature ID: 1057280

Bacon is an unincorporated community in Linton Township, Coshocton County, Ohio, United States.

== History ==
Bacon contained a post office from 1858 until 1906. The community took its name from nearby Bacon Run.
