= Perry Township, Muskingum County, Ohio =

Township in Ohio, US

- Township
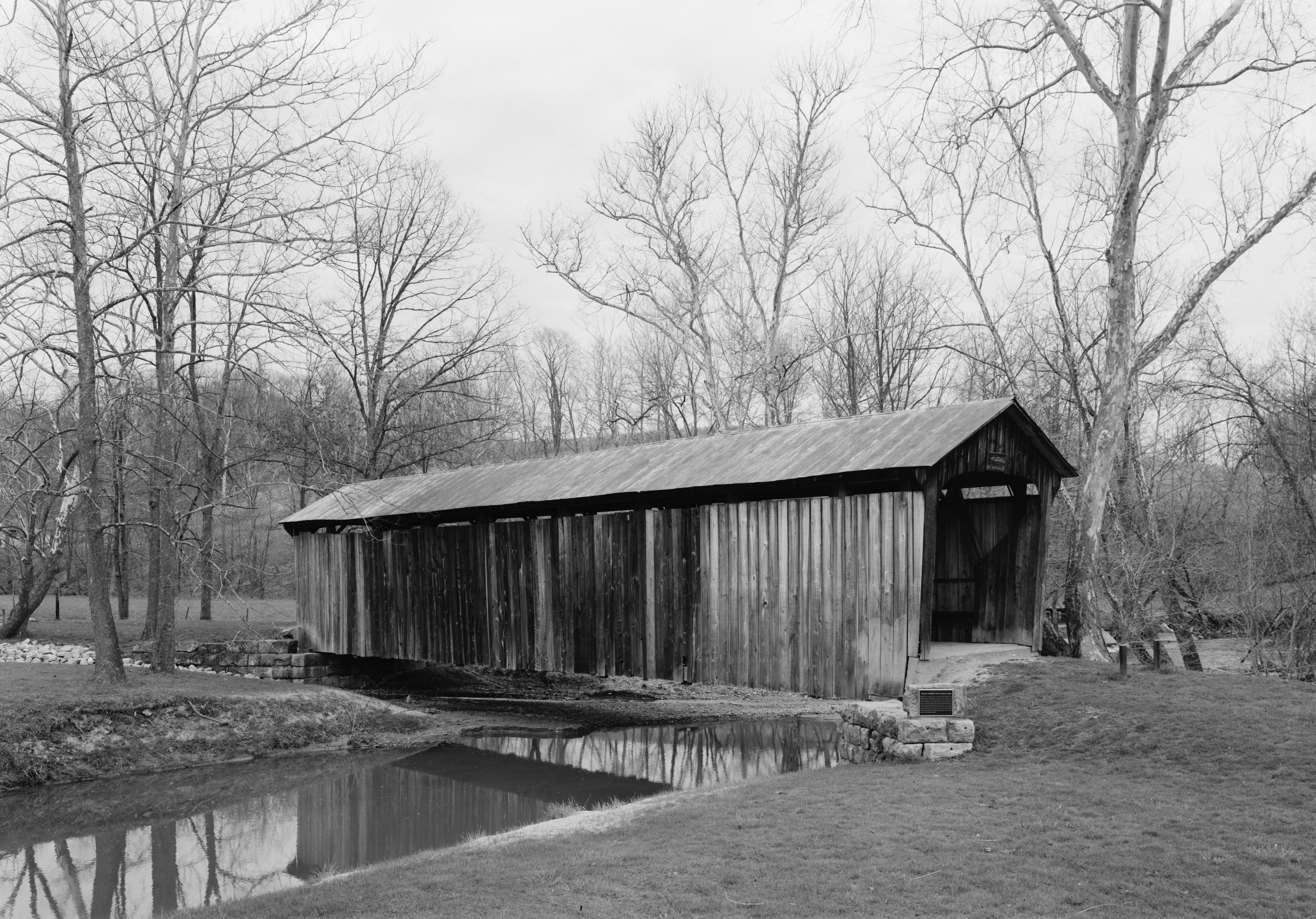
- Salt Creek Covered Bridge, northwest of Norwich

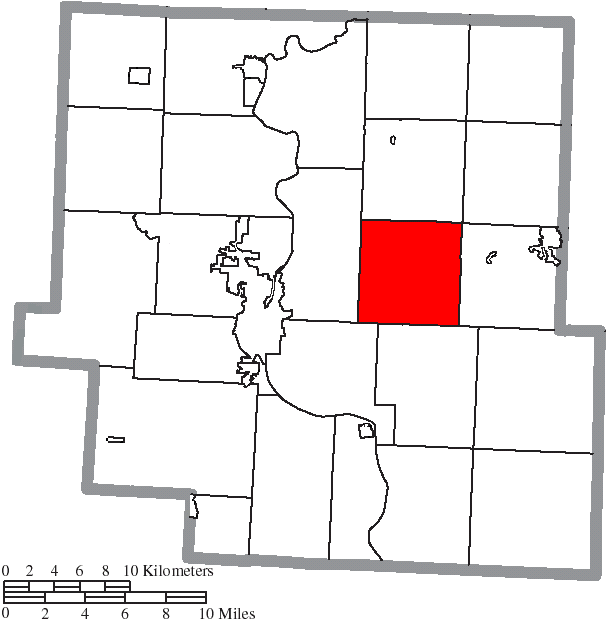
- Location of Perry Township in Muskingum County
- Coordinates: 39°58′26″N 81°52′3″W
- Country: United States
- State: Ohio
- County: Muskingum

Area
  - Total: 25.6 sq mi (66.3 km^{2})
  - Land: 25.6 sq mi (66.3 km^{2})
  - Water: 0 sq mi (0.0 km^{2})
- Elevation: 866 ft (264 m)

Population (2020)
  - Total: 2,728
  - Density: 107/sq mi (41.1/km^{2})
- Time zone: UTC-5 (Eastern (EST))
  - Summer (DST): UTC-4 (EDT)
- FIPS code: 39-61994
- GNIS feature ID: 1086730
- Website: https://perrytwpmuskingum.org/

Perry Township is one of the twenty-five townships of Muskingum County, Ohio, United States. The 2020 census found 2,728 people in the township.

== Geography ==
Located in the east central part of the county, it borders the following townships:

- Salem Township - north
- Highland Township - northeast corner
- Union Township - east
- Salt Creek Township - south
- Wayne Township - southwest
- Washington Township - west

No municipalities are located in Perry Township.

== Name and history ==
Perry Township was established in 1812, and named after Oliver Hazard Perry (1785–1819), an American naval officer. It is one of twenty-six Perry Townships statewide.

By the 1830s, Perry Township contained three churches, four flouring mills, and five saw mills.

== Government ==
The township is governed by a three-member board of trustees, who are elected in November of odd-numbered years to a four-year term beginning on the following January 1. Two are elected in the year after the presidential election and one is elected in the year before it. There is also an elected township fiscal officer, who serves a four-year term beginning on April 1 of the year after the election, which is held in November of the year before the presidential election. Vacancies in the fiscal officership or on the board of trustees are filled by the remaining trustees.
