= Brookfield Township, Noble County, Ohio =

Township in Ohio, US

- Township
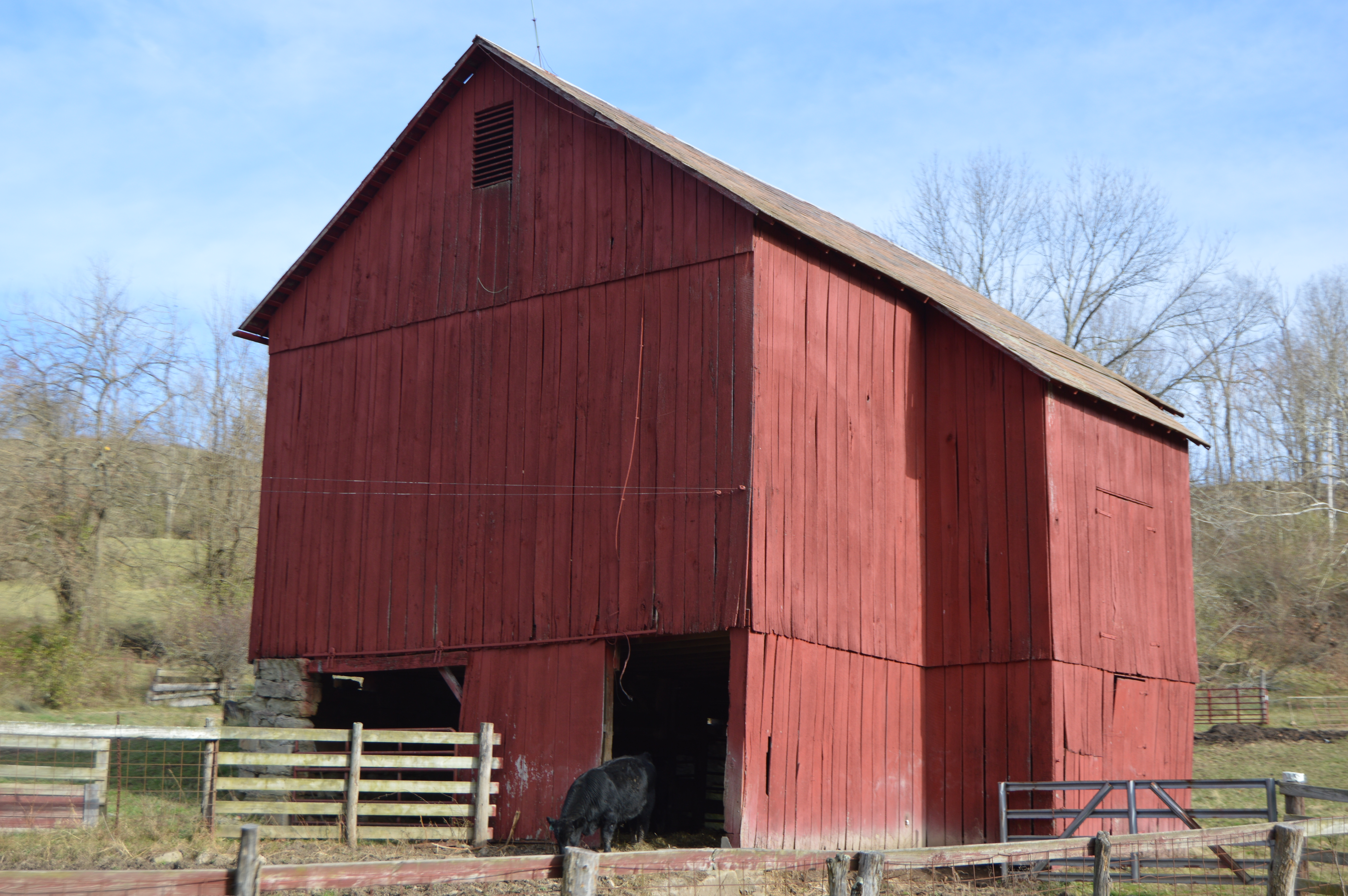
- Barn on State Route 340

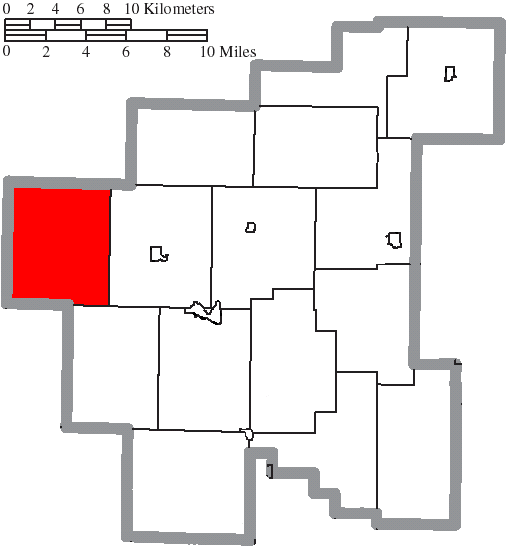
- Location of Brookfield Township in Noble County
- Coordinates: 39°47′53″N 81°38′52″W
- Country: United States
- State: Ohio
- County: Noble

Area
  - Total: 30.5 sq mi (79.1 km^{2})
  - Land: 29.8 sq mi (77.2 km^{2})
  - Water: 0.69 sq mi (1.8 km^{2})
- Elevation: 935 ft (285 m)

Population (2020)
  - Total: 112
  - Density: 3.76/sq mi (1.45/km^{2})
- Time zone: UTC-5 (Eastern (EST))
  - Summer (DST): UTC-4 (EDT)
- FIPS code: 39-09162
- GNIS feature ID: 1086740

Brookfield Township is one of the fifteen townships of Noble County, Ohio, United States. The 2020 census found 112 people in the township, the third smallest township in the state of Ohio.

== Geography ==
Located in the western part of the county, it borders the following townships:

- Spencer Township, Guernsey County - north
- Noble Township - east
- Sharon Township - southeast
- Manchester Township, Morgan County - south
- Bristol Township, Morgan County - southwest corner
- Meigs Township, Muskingum County - west
- Rich Hill Township, Muskingum County - northwest corner

The most westerly township in Noble County, it is the only county township to border Muskingum County.

No municipalities are located in Brookfield Township.

== Name and history ==
Statewide, the only other Brookfield Township is located in Trumbull County.

== Government ==
The township is governed by a three-member board of trustees, who are elected in November of odd-numbered years to a four-year term beginning on the following January 1. Two are elected in the year after the presidential election and one is elected in the year before it. There is also an elected township fiscal officer, who serves a four-year term beginning on April 1 of the year after the election, which is held in November of the year before the presidential election. Vacancies in the fiscal officership or on the board of trustees are filled by the remaining trustees.
