= Rich Hill Township, Muskingum County, Ohio =

Township in Ohio, US

- Township
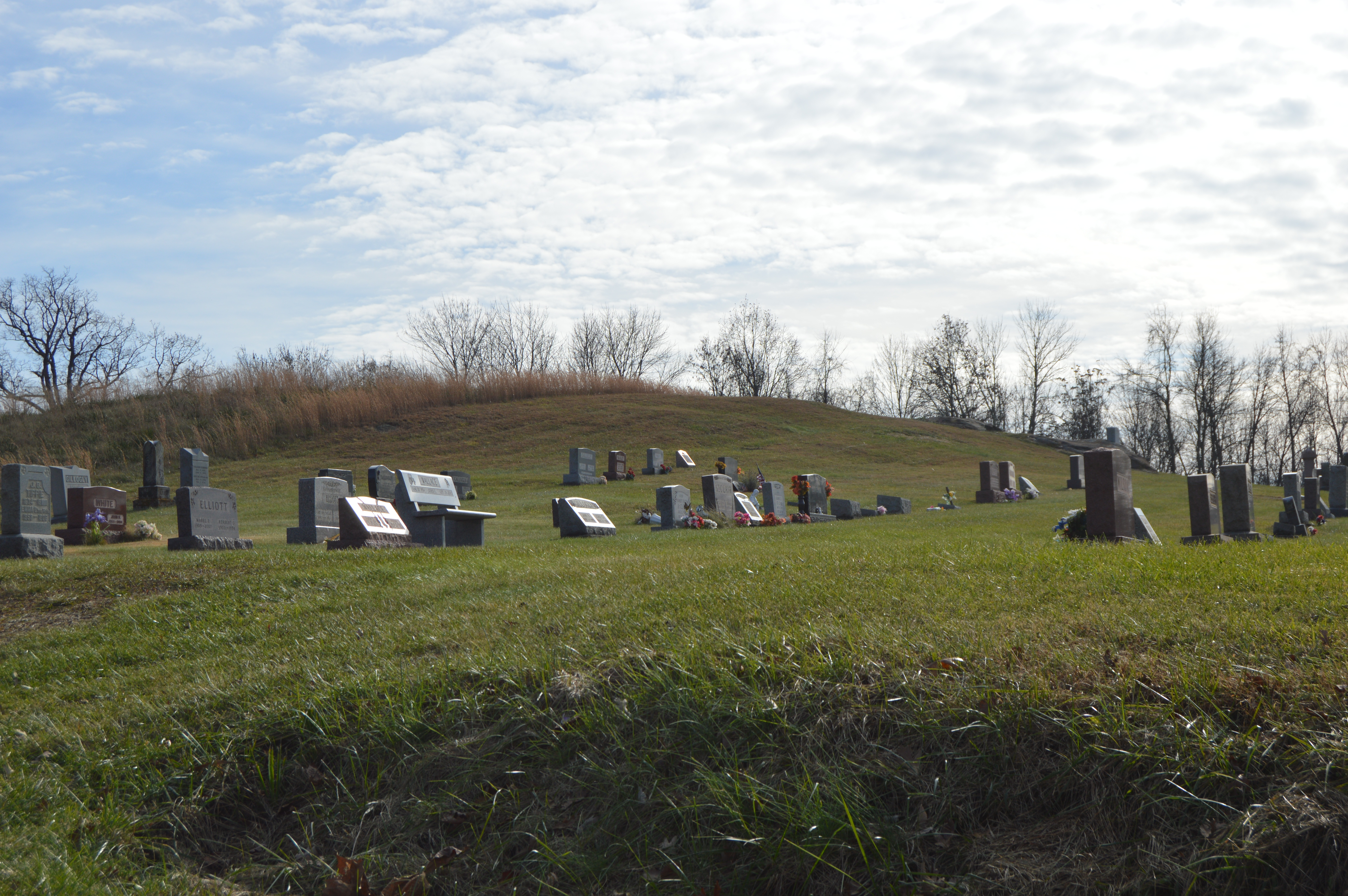
- Cemetery on Zion Ridge Road

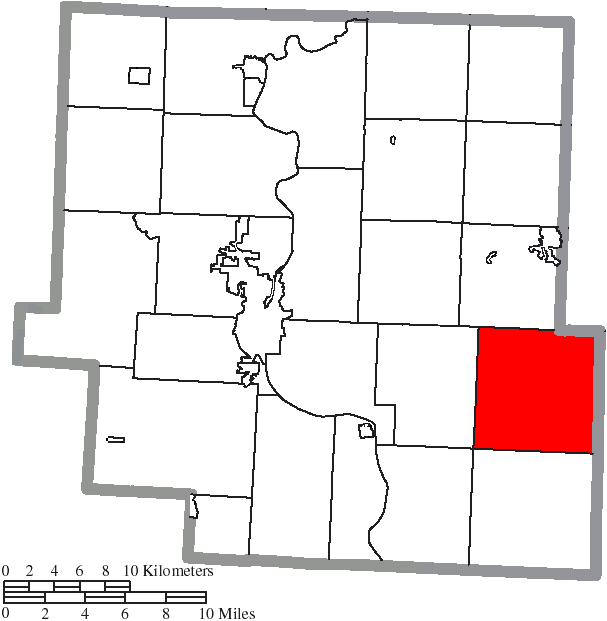
- Location of Rich Hill Township in Muskingum County
- Coordinates: 39°53′7″N 81°44′32″W
- Country: United States
- State: Ohio
- County: Muskingum

Area
  - Total: 36.8 sq mi (95.2 km^{2})
  - Land: 36.3 sq mi (93.9 km^{2})
  - Water: 0.50 sq mi (1.3 km^{2})
- Elevation: 850 ft (260 m)

Population (2020)
  - Total: 489
  - Density: 13.5/sq mi (5.21/km^{2})
- Time zone: UTC-5 (Eastern (EST))
  - Summer (DST): UTC-4 (EDT)
- FIPS code: 39-66600
- GNIS feature ID: 1086731

Rich Hill Township is one of the twenty-five townships of Muskingum County, Ohio, United States. The 2020 census found 489 people in the township.

== Geography ==
Located on the eastern edge of the county, it borders the following townships:

- Union Township - north
- Westland Township, Guernsey County - northeast
- Spencer Township, Guernsey County - east
- Brookfield Township, Noble County - southeast corner
- Meigs Township - south
- Blue Rock Township - southwest corner
- Salt Creek Township - west

No municipalities are located in Rich Hill Township.

== Name and history ==
Rich Hill Township was established in 1815. It is the only Rich Hill Township statewide.

== Government ==
The township is governed by a three-member board of trustees, who are elected in November of odd-numbered years to a four-year term beginning on the following January 1. Two are elected in the year after the presidential election and one is elected in the year before it. There is also an elected township fiscal officer, who serves a four-year term beginning on April 1 of the year after the election, which is held in November of the year before the presidential election. Vacancies in the fiscal officership or on the board of trustees are filled by the remaining trustees.
