= Samuel Harper Stone House =

Historic house in Ohio, United States

- U.S. National Register of Historic Places
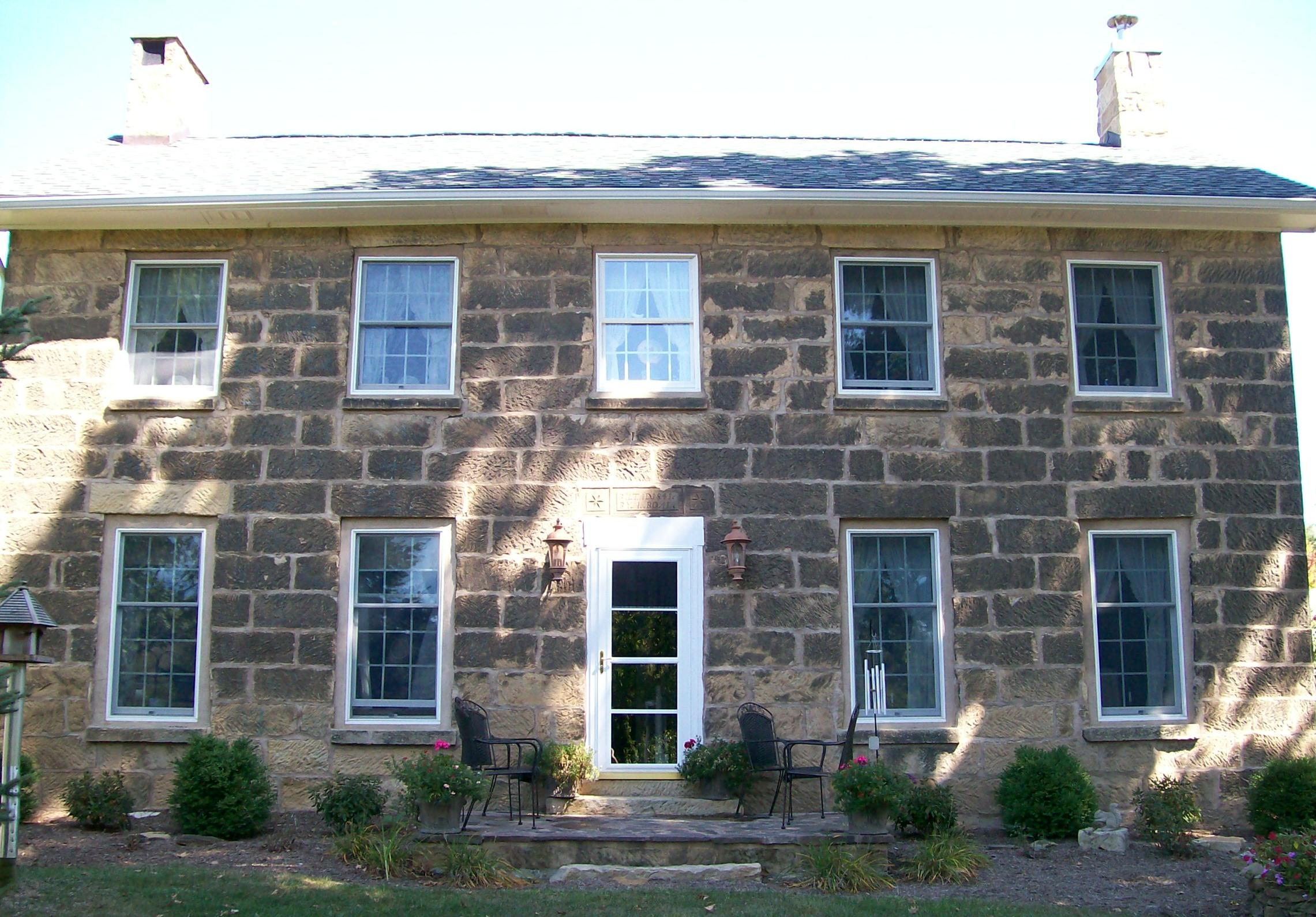
- The Samuel Harper Stone House in 2009

- Location within Ohio Location within the United States
- Location: State Route 416 north of New Concord, Ohio
- Coordinates: 40°2′0″N 81°43′12″W
- Area: Less than 1 acre (0.40 ha)
- Built: 1841
- Architect: Archibald Boal
- Architectural style: I-house
- NRHP reference No.: 80003033
- Added to NRHP: January 3, 1980

The Samuel Harper Stone House is a historic residence in rural Guernsey County, Ohio, United States. A traditional building constructed in the 1840s by a well-known local builder, it has been named a historic site.

The first resident of the house, Samuel Harper, was an ancestor of founding University of Chicago president William Rainey Harper, although the latter man was never associated with his forefather's house. Construction was performed in 1841 by Norwich resident Archibald Boal, who gained the reputation of a master stonemason through his work on buildings such as the Harper House.

Constructed of sandstone on a foundation of another kind of stone, the Harper House is typical of the once-common vernacular building form known as the I-house. The two-story interior is built around a central hallway on each floor, with rooms on either side. The façade is a simple rectangle, with narrow sides rising to gables and a wider five-bay façade. A chimney pierces the roofline at either end, while the façade features openings in each bay of each story; all are windows except the center of the first story, in which the main entrance is placed. The building is exceedingly simple, with virtually no ornamentation; the sole exception is slight decoration above the main entrance on the lintel. Assorted farm-related outbuildings surround the house, which predates all of the outbuildings.

In early 1980, the Harper House was listed on the National Register of Historic Places, qualifying because of its historically significant architecture. The same designation was granted on the same day to the James Hunter Stone House near Adamsville to the west, another building constructed by Archibald Boal.
