= Bridgeville =

Bridgeville can refer to:

== Canada ==
- Bridgeville, Nova Scotia, in Pictou County

== United States ==
- Bridgeville, California, unincorporated town in Humboldt County, California, known for being the first town to be sold on eBay
- Bridgeville, Delaware, town in Sussex County, Delaware
- Bridgeville, Kentucky, an unincorporated community
- Bridgeville, New York, hamlet in Sullivan County, New York
- Bridgeville, Ohio, an unincorporated community
- Bridgeville, Pennsylvania, borough in Allegheny County, Pennsylvania
- former name of Elba, Alabama, city in Coffee County, Alabama
