= Ohio State Route 586 =

State highway in central Ohio, US

State Route 586

Route information
- Maintained by ODOT
- Length: 29.98 mi (48.25 km)
- Existed: 1939–present

Major junctions
- South end: SR 146 in Nashport
- US 62 / SR 541 in Martinsburg
- North end: SR 13 in Mount Vernon

Location
- Country: United States
- State: Ohio
- Counties: Muskingum, Licking, Knox

Highway system
- Ohio State Highway System; Interstate; US; State; Scenic
← SR 585	→ SR 587

State Route 586 (SR 586) is a north–south state highway located in the central portion of the U.S. state of Ohio. The highway's southern terminus is at a T-intersection with SR 146 in the unincorporated community of Nashport. The highway's northern terminus is at a Y-intersection with SR 13 in Mount Vernon.

== Route description ==
Along its way, SR 586 travels through northwestern Muskingum County, northeastern Licking County and southeastern Knox County. No portion of this highway is included as a component of the National Highway System, a network of routes identified as most important for the nation's economy, mobility and defense.

== History ==
SR 586 was designated in 1939. It was established along the routing between SR 146 in Nashport and SR 13 in Mount Vernon that it utilizes today. No changes of major significance have taken place to the highway since its designation.

== Major intersections ==
County	Location	mi	km	Destinations	Notes
Muskingum	Licking Township	0.00	0.00	SR 146 – Newark, Zanesville	
Muskingum	Jackson Township	3.11	5.01	SR 16 – Coshocton, Newark	Interchange
Licking	Fallsbury Township	10.99	17.69	SR 79 – Nellie, Newark	
Knox	Martinsburg	19.26	31.00	US 62 west (West Liberty Street) / SR 541 east – Utica, Coshocton	Southern end of US 62 concurrency; western terminus of SR 541
Knox	Martinsburg	19.39	31.21	US 62 east (North Market Street) / Mechanic Street – Danville	Northern end of US 62 concurrency
Knox	Mount Vernon	29.98	48.25	SR 13 (Newark Road)	
1.000 mi = 1.609 km; 1.000 km = 0.621 mi: Concurrency terminus
