= Museville =

Museville may refer to:

- Museville, Ohio, an unincorporated community in Muskingum County
- Museville, Virginia, an unincorporated community in Pittsylvania County
