= Ironspot, Ohio =

Unincorporated community in Ohio, U.S.

Ironspot
- unincorporated community
- Interactive map of Ironspot
- Coordinates: 39°49′07″N 82°03′41″W
- Country: United States
- State: Ohio
- County: Muskingum County

Ironspot is an unincorporated community in Muskingum County, in the U.S. state of Ohio.

== History ==
An original variant name was Beem City. Beem City was laid out in 1895 by John H. Beem, and named for him. The new name of Iron Spot was adopted ca. 1905. A post office called Ironspot was established in 1905, and remained in operation until 1923.
