= Harrison Township, Muskingum County, Ohio =

Township in Ohio, US

- Township
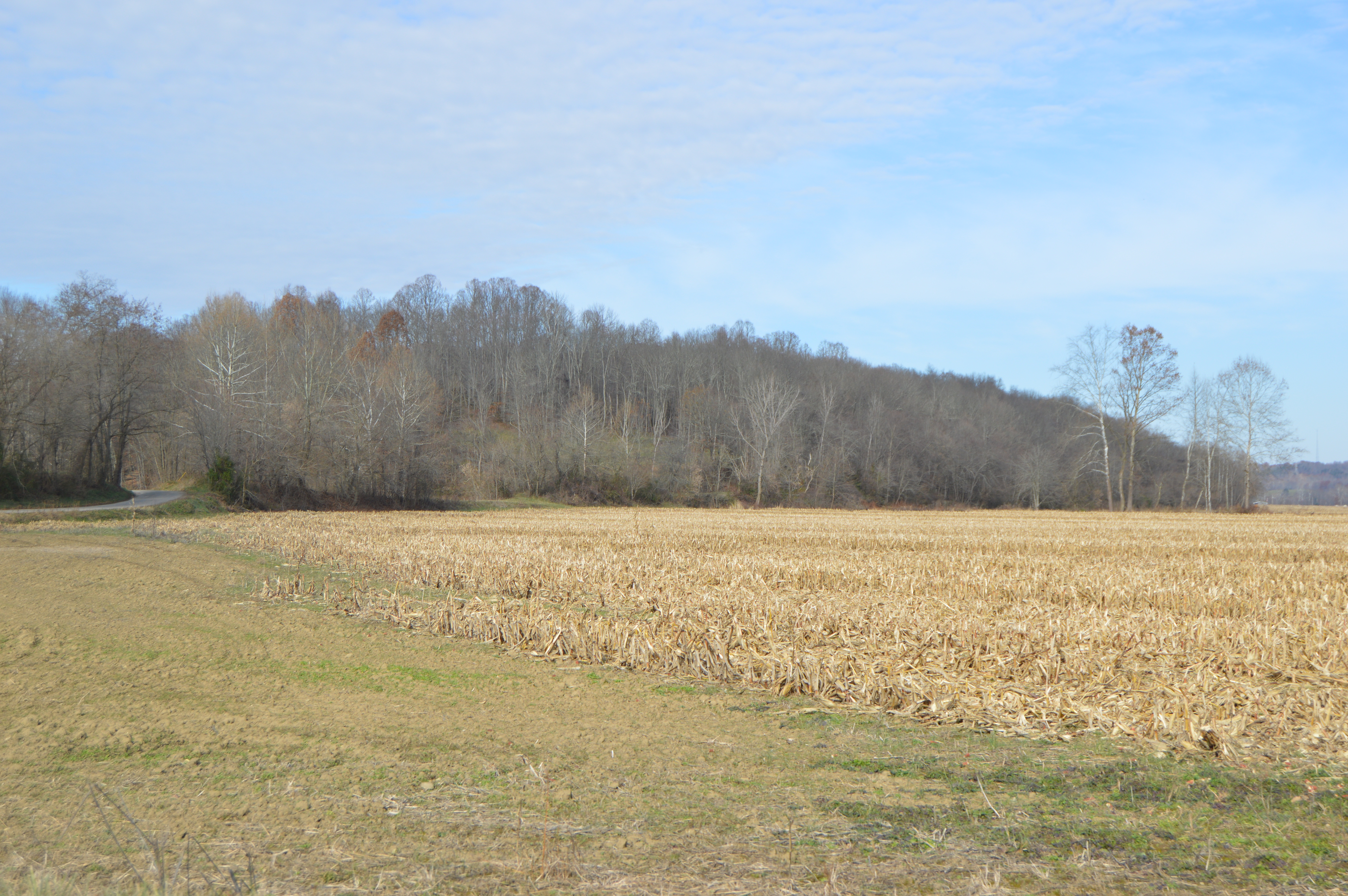
- Fields west of Gaysport

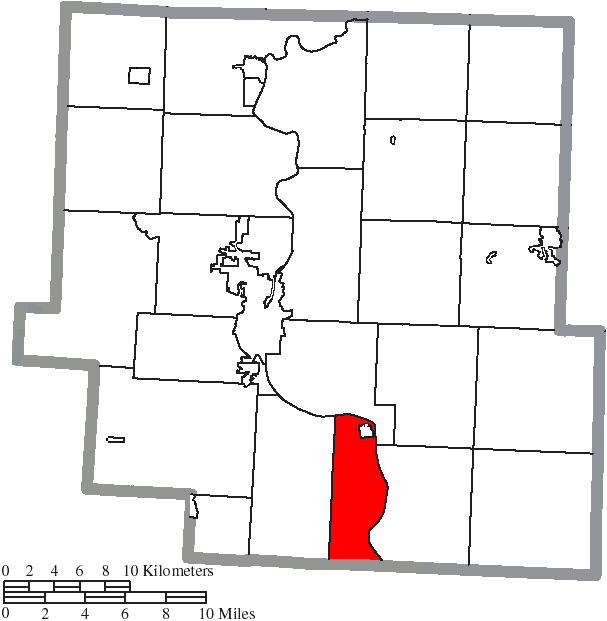
- Location of Harrison Township in Muskingum County
- Coordinates: 39°51′6″N 81°55′1″W
- Country: United States
- State: Ohio
- County: Muskingum

Area
  - Total: 16.9 sq mi (43.8 km^{2})
  - Land: 16.5 sq mi (42.8 km^{2})
  - Water: 0.39 sq mi (1.0 km^{2})
- Elevation: 981 ft (299 m)

Population (2020)
  - Total: 1,521
  - Density: 92.0/sq mi (35.5/km^{2})
- Time zone: UTC-5 (Eastern (EST))
  - Summer (DST): UTC-4 (EDT)
- FIPS code: 39-33936
- GNIS feature ID: 1086719

Harrison Township is one of the twenty-five townships of Muskingum County, Ohio, United States. The 2020 census found 1,521 people in the township.

== Geography ==
Located on the southern edge of the county, it borders the following townships:

- Wayne Township - north
- Blue Rock Township - east
- Bloom Township, Morgan County - southeast
- York Township, Morgan County - southwest
- Brush Creek Township - west

The village of Philo is located in northern Harrison Township.

== Name and history ==
Harrison Township was organized in 1839. It is one of nineteen Harrison Townships statewide.

== Government ==
The township is governed by a three-member board of trustees, who are elected in November of odd-numbered years to a four-year term beginning on the following January 1. Two are elected in the year after the presidential election and one is elected in the year before it. There is also an elected township fiscal officer, who serves a four-year term beginning on April 1 of the year after the election, which is held in November of the year before the presidential election. Vacancies in the fiscal officership or on the board of trustees are filled by the remaining trustees.
