= Meigs Township, Ohio =

Meigs Township, Ohio may refer to:

- Meigs Township, Adams County, Ohio
- Meigs Township, Muskingum County, Ohio
