= Licking Township, Ohio =

Licking Township, Ohio, may refer to:

- Licking Township, Licking County, Ohio
- Licking Township, Muskingum County, Ohio
