= Blue Rock, Ohio =

Unincorporated community in Ohio, U.S.

Coordinates: 39°48′00″N 81°53′29″W

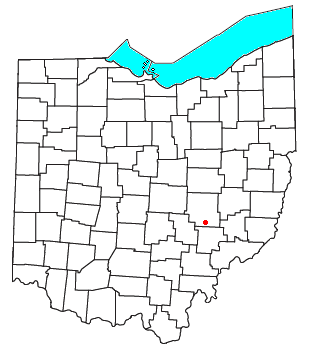
Location of Blue Rock in Ohio

Blue Rock is an unincorporated community in western Blue Rock Township, Muskingum County, Ohio, United States. The community is served by the Franklin Local School District.

Blue Rock State Park is located near the community and is a notable recreational area in the region.

Although Blue Rock is unincorporated, it uses the ZIP Code 43720 through the post office located in the nearby unincorporated community of Gaysport. Gaysport is situated along the Muskingum River near the junction of State Route 60 and State Route 376.
