= South Zanesville, Ohio =

- Village
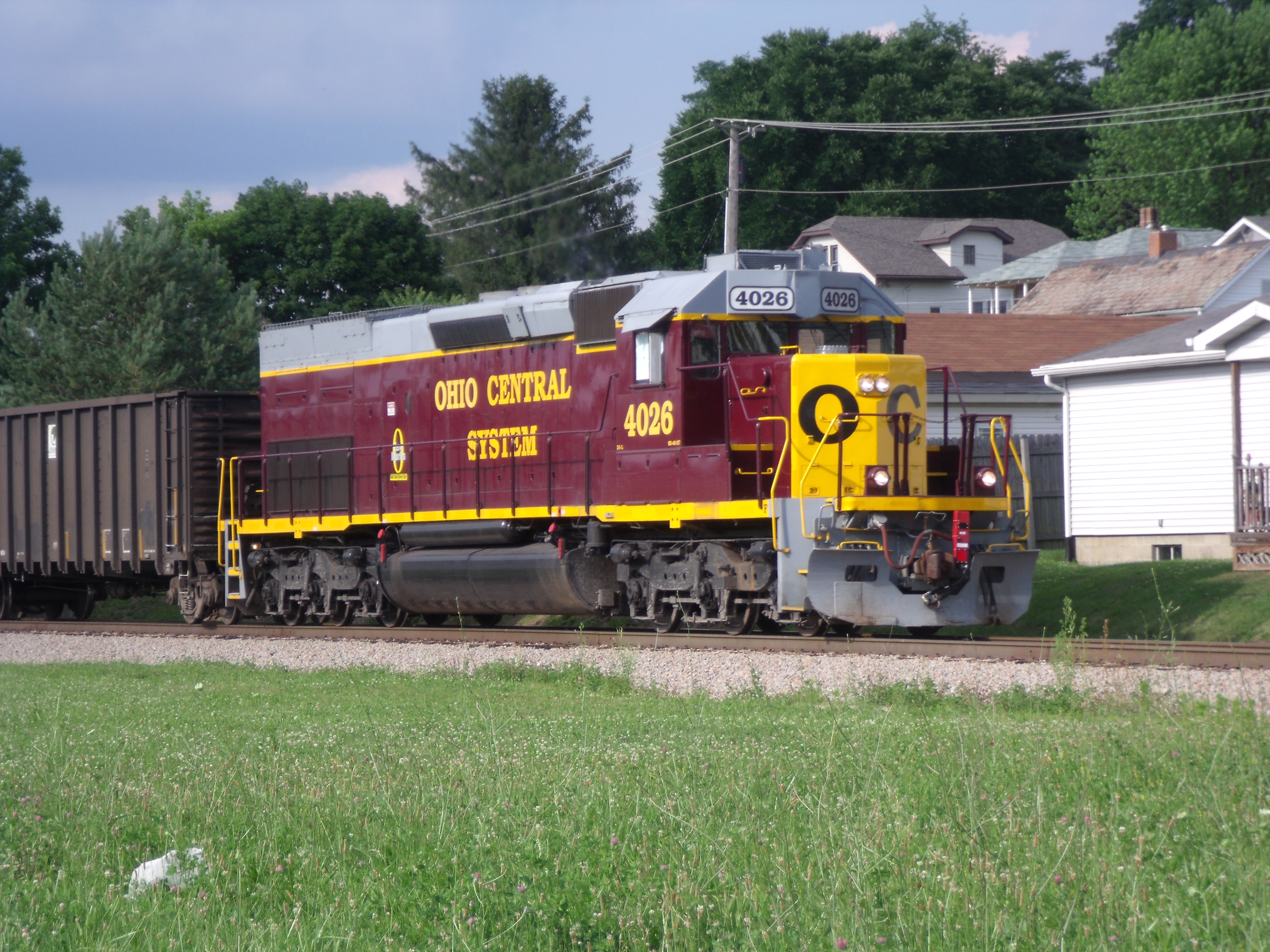
- Train and houses in South Zanesville

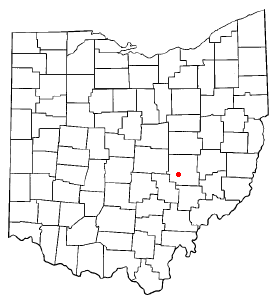
- Location of South Zanesville, Ohio

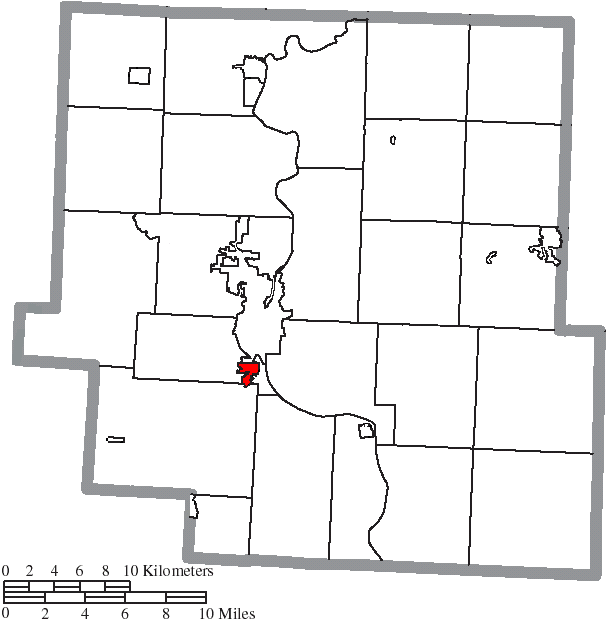
- Location of South Zanesville in Muskingum County
- Coordinates: 39°54′13″N 82°01′04″W
- Country: United States
- State: Ohio
- County: Muskingum
- Townships: Springfield, Newton

Area
  - Total: 0.80 sq mi (2.08 km^{2})
  - Land: 0.80 sq mi (2.08 km^{2})
  - Water: 0 sq mi (0.00 km^{2})
- Elevation: 742 ft (226 m)

Population (2020)
  - Total: 1,894
  - Density: 2,356.0/sq mi (909.67/km^{2})
- Time zone: UTC-5 (Eastern (EST))
  - Summer (DST): UTC-4 (EDT)
- ZIP code: 43701
- Area code: 740
- FIPS code: 39-73894
- GNIS feature ID: 2399863
- Website: https://www.villageofsouthzanesville.com/

South Zanesville is a village in Muskingum County, Ohio, United States, along the Muskingum River near the mouth of the Moxahala Creek. The population was 1,894 at the 2020 census. It is part of the Zanesville micropolitan area.

== Geography ==
According to the United States Census Bureau, the village has a total area of 0.83 square miles (2.15 km^{2}), all land.

== Demographics ==
Historical population
Census	Pop.	Note	%±
1910	853		—
1920	1,010		18.4%
1930	1,278		26.5%
1940	1,338		4.7%
1950	1,477		10.4%
1960	1,557		5.4%
1970	1,436		−7.8%
1980	1,739		21.1%
1990	1,969		13.2%
2000	1,936		−1.7%
2010	1,989		2.7%
2020	1,894		−4.8%
U.S. Decennial Census

=== 2010 census ===
As of the census of 2010, there were 1,989 people, 830 households, and 539 families living in the village. The population density was 2,396.4 inhabitants per square mile (925.3/km^{2}). There were 902 housing units at an average density of 1,086.7 per square mile (419.6/km^{2}). The racial makeup of the village was 94.1% White, 3.0% African American, 0.3% Native American, 0.1% Asian, 0.1% Pacific Islander, 0.1% from other races, and 2.4% from two or more races. Hispanic or Latino of any race were 0.3% of the population.

There were 830 households, of which 34.9% had children under the age of 18 living with them, 39.0% were married couples living together, 18.4% had a female householder with no husband present, 7.5% had a male householder with no wife present, and 35.1% were non-families. 29.5% of all households were made up of individuals, and 12.1% had someone living alone who was 65 years of age or older. The average household size was 2.40 and the average family size was 2.90.

The median age in the village was 37.1 years. 25.9% of residents were under the age of 18; 7.7% were between the ages of 18 and 24; 25.6% were from 25 to 44; 27.1% were from 45 to 64; and 13.4% were 65 years of age or older. The gender makeup of the village was 48.3% male and 51.7% female.

=== 2000 census ===
As of the census of 2000, there were 1,936 people, 797 households, and 540 families living in the village. The population density was 2,653.2 inhabitants per square mile (1,024.4/km^{2}). There were 874 housing units at an average density of 1,197.8 per square mile (462.5/km^{2}). The racial makeup of the village was 97.73% White, 1.08% African American, 0.21% Native American, 0.10% Asian, 0.10% from other races, and 0.77% from two or more races. Hispanic or Latino of any race were 0.26% of the population.

There were 797 households, out of which 32.1% had children under the age of 18 living with them, 48.8% were married couples living together, 13.6% had a female householder with no husband present, and 32.2% were non-families. 26.5% of all households were made up of individuals, and 10.9% had someone living alone who was 65 years of age or older. The average household size was 2.43 and the average family size was 2.90.

In the village, the population was spread out, with 25.2% under the age of 18, 9.0% from 18 to 24, 29.7% from 25 to 44, 21.3% from 45 to 64, and 14.7% who were 65 years of age or older. The median age was 36 years. For every 100 females there were 89.6 males. For every 100 females age 18 and over, there were 89.0 males.

The median income for a household in the village was $32,292, and the median income for a family was $37,837. Males had a median income of $27,724 versus $21,220 for females. The per capita income for the village was $14,920. About 10.3% of families and 11.1% of the population were below the poverty line, including 12.5% of those under the age of 18 and 14.4% of those 65 and older.

== High schools ==
- Maysville High School
