= Mattingly Settlement, Ohio =

Historic area and unincorporated community in Ohio, US

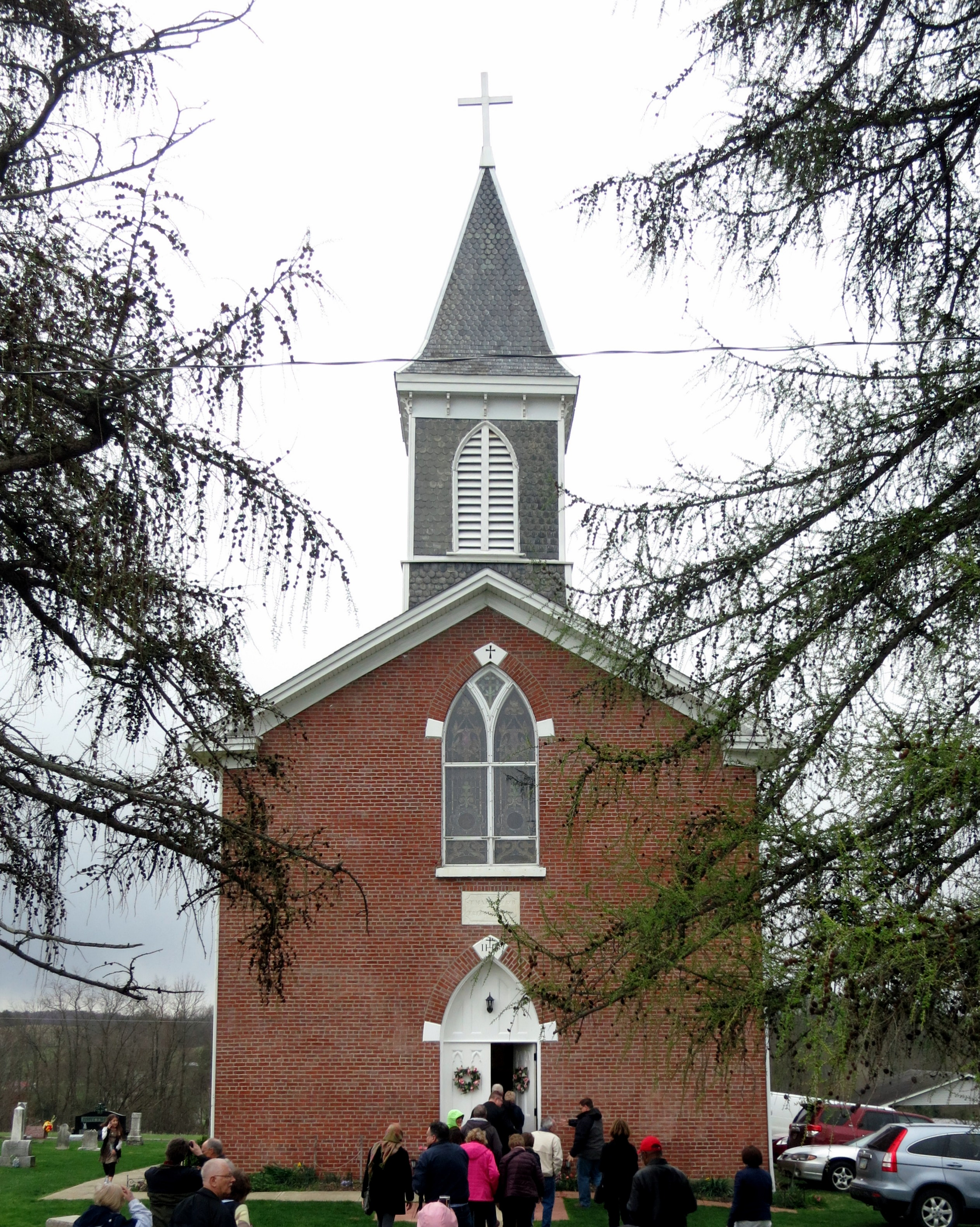
Church of the Nativity of the Blessed Virgin Mary

The Mattingly Settlement is a historic area and unincorporated community in Muskingum Township, Muskingum County, Ohio, United States. It was named after the many members of the Mattingly family who settled the area in the 19th century, the first being William Mattingly (1778–1857) who arrived in 1812.

Addressees in the area receive mail through the Nashport post office; Nashport is located about five miles west of the Mattingly Settlement.

Though the Mattingly Settlement was never officially incorporated as a village, it is still used by the Diocese of Columbus as the location of The Church of the Nativity of the Blessed Virgin Mary (commonly known as St. Mary's).

The US Geographic Names Information System (GNIS) does not contain a name listing for the Mattingly Settlement, but there is a listing for the Mattingly Settlement Cemetery at 40°02′26″N 82°04′10″W. The St. Mary's Church is located next door to the cemetery.

== Bibliography ==
- Schneider, Norris F. Y Bridge City (1950). 414 pp.
- Schneider, Norris F. "Mattingly Settlement" Zanesville Sunday Times Signal, April 17, 1949, http://www.rootsweb.ancestry.com/~ohmuski2/muskingum/mattingly_settlement_1949.html
- Smeltzer, Patrick V. and Factor, Benjamin E. The History of the Church of the Nativity of the Blessed Virgin Mary (2006). 46 pp.
