= Licking View, Ohio =

- Unincorporated community
- Location within Ohio Location within the United States
- Coordinates: 39°57′14″N 82°01′59″W
- Country: United States
- State: Ohio
- County: Muskingum
- Township: Falls
- Elevation: 715 ft (218 m)
- Time zone: UTC-5 (Eastern (EST))
  - Summer (DST): UTC-4 (EDT)
- ZIP Code: 43701 (Zanesville)
- Area code: 740
- GNIS feature ID: 1048913

Licking View is an unincorporated community in Muskingum County, Ohio, United States. Licking View is located along the Licking River near the western border of Zanesville.
