= High Hill =

High Hill may refer to:

- High Hill, Cumbria, a village in England
- High Hill (Florida), Florida's third highest hill
- High Hill, Missouri, a city in the USA
- High Hill, Ohio, an unincorporated community
- High Hill, Texas, a settlement in the USA
