= Muskingum Township, Muskingum County, Ohio =

Township in Ohio, US

- Township
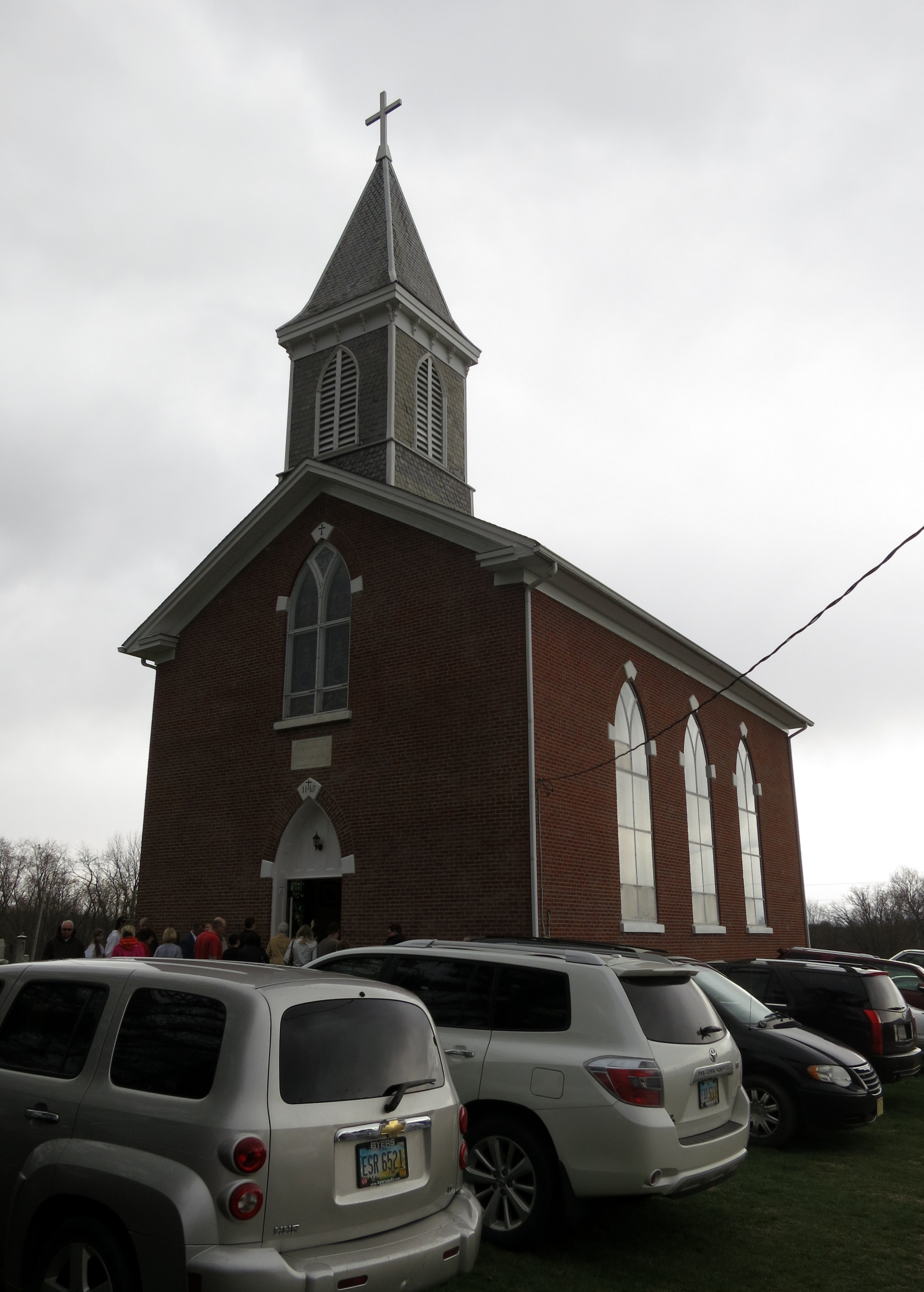
- Church of the Nativity at Mattingly Settlement

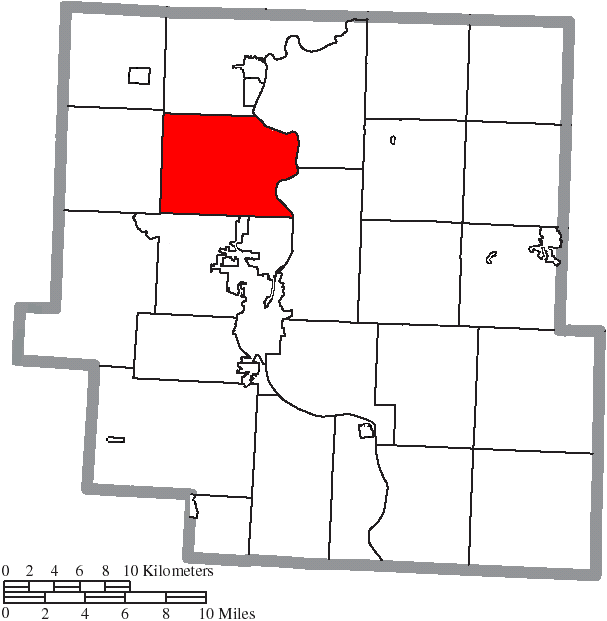
- Location of Muskingum Township in Muskingum County
- Coordinates: 40°2′40″N 82°2′22″W
- Country: United States
- State: Ohio
- County: Muskingum

Area
  - Total: 30.7 sq mi (79.4 km^{2})
  - Land: 30.3 sq mi (78.4 km^{2})
  - Water: 0.35 sq mi (0.9 km^{2})
- Elevation: 958 ft (292 m)

Population (2020)
  - Total: 4,861
  - Density: 161/sq mi (62.0/km^{2})
- Time zone: UTC-5 (Eastern (EST))
  - Summer (DST): UTC-4 (EDT)
- FIPS code: 39-53438
- GNIS feature ID: 1086728
- Website: https://muskingumtownship.com/

Muskingum Township is one of the twenty-five townships of Muskingum County, Ohio, United States. The 2020 census found 4,861 people in the township.

== Geography ==
Located in the north central part of the county, it borders the following townships:

- Cass Township - north
- Madison Township - northeast
- Washington Township - southwest
- Falls Township - south
- Licking Township - west

No municipalities are located in Muskingum Township.

== Name and history ==
The name Muskingum may come from the Shawnee word mshkikwam 'swampy ground'. The name may also be from Lenape "Machkigen," referring to thorns, or a specific species of thorn bush. Muskingum has also been taken to mean 'elk's eye' (mus wəshkinkw) by folk etymology, as in mus 'elk' + wəshkinkw 'its eye'. Moravian missionary David Zeisberger wrote that the Muskingum River was called Elk's Eye "because of the numbers of elk that formerly fed on its banks."

A Lenape village named Muskingum was established in the area in 1747 and was an important trade center in the early 1750s, until it was devastated by smallpox in the winter of 1752.

Statewide, the only other Muskingum Township is located in Washington County.

== Emergency services ==
The Muskingum Township is protected by the Falls Township Fire Department, which provides Fire & EMS services to Falls Township, Muskingum Township and mutual aid for surrounding departments. Falls Township Fire Department currently has 3 stations.

== Government ==
The township is governed by a three-member board of trustees, who are elected in November of odd-numbered years to a four-year term beginning on the following January 1. Two are elected in the year after the presidential election and one is elected in the year before it. There is also an elected township fiscal officer, who serves a four-year term beginning on April 1 of the year after the election, which is held in November of the year before the presidential election. Vacancies in the fiscal officership or on the board of trustees are filled by the remaining trustees.

== Demographics ==
Historical population
Census	Pop.	Note	%±
1820	872		—
1830	1,336		53.2%
1840	1,252		−6.3%
1850	1,509		20.5%
1860	1,230		−18.5%
1870	1,078		−12.4%
1880	1,018		−5.6%
1890	817		−19.7%
1900	812		−0.6%
1910	773		−4.8%
1920	647		−16.3%
1930	676		4.5%
1940	732		8.3%
1950	759		3.7%
1960	809		6.6%
1970	1,064		31.5%
1980	2,712		154.9%
1990	3,343		23.3%
2000	3,813		14.1%
2010	4,520		18.5%
2020	4,861		7.5%

== Education ==
Nashport Elementary, which is part of the Tri-Valley Local School District, is located on Creamery Road in Muskingum Township.
