= Brush Creek Township, Muskingum County, Ohio =

Township in Ohio, US

- Township
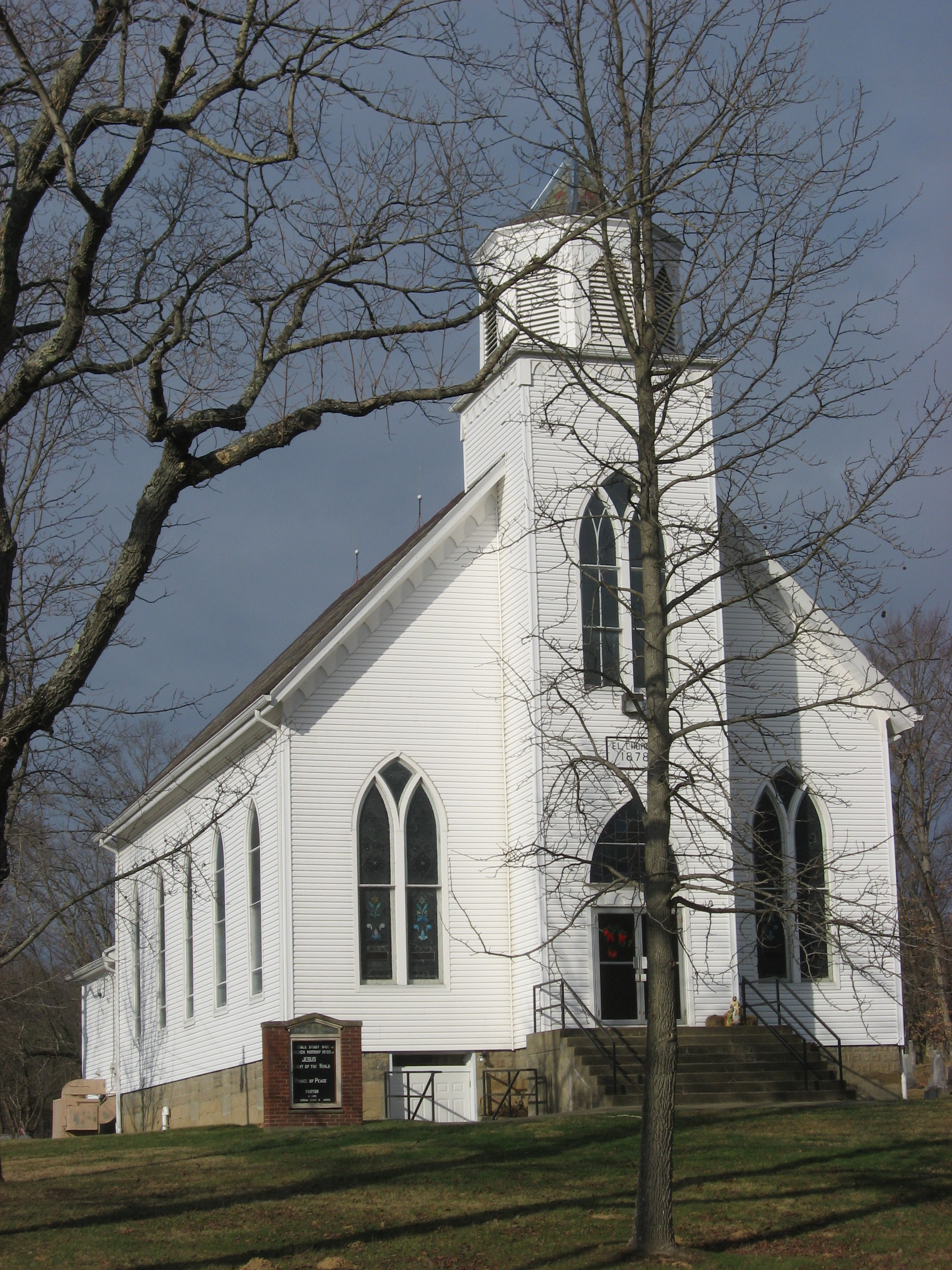
- St. John's Evangelical Lutheran Church

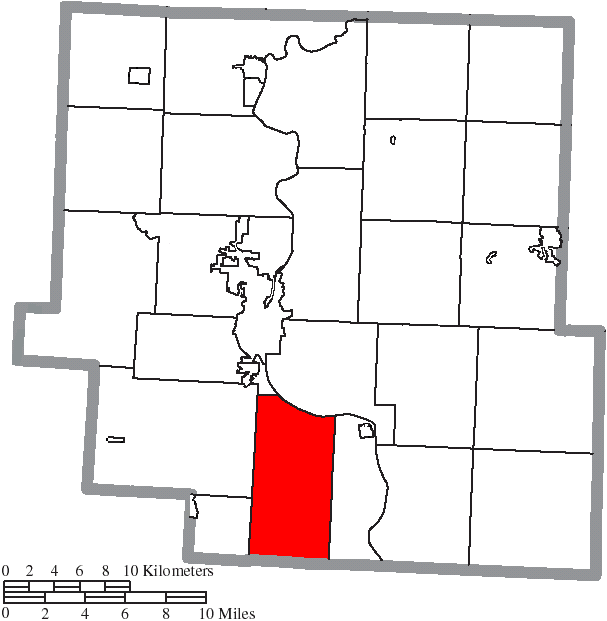
- Location of Brush Creek Township in Muskingum County
- Coordinates: 39°49′58″N 81°59′13″W
- Country: United States
- State: Ohio
- County: Muskingum

Area
  - Total: 30.4 sq mi (78.8 km^{2})
  - Land: 30.3 sq mi (78.6 km^{2})
  - Water: 0.12 sq mi (0.3 km^{2})
- Elevation: 719 ft (219 m)

Population (2020)
  - Total: 1,286
  - Density: 42.4/sq mi (16.4/km^{2})
- Time zone: UTC-5 (Eastern (EST))
  - Summer (DST): UTC-4 (EDT)
- FIPS code: 39-09757
- GNIS feature ID: 1086715

Brush Creek Township is one of the twenty-five townships of Muskingum County, Ohio, United States. The 2020 census found 1,286 people in the township.

== Geography ==
Located on the southern edge of the county, it borders the following townships:

- Wayne Township - northeast
- Harrison Township - east
- York Township, Morgan County - south
- Clay Township - southwest
- Newton Township - west
- Springfield Township - northwest

No municipalities are located in Brush Creek Township.

== Name and history ==
Statewide, other Brush Creek Townships are located in Adams, Jefferson, and Scioto counties, plus a Brushcreek Township in Highland County.

== Government ==
The township is governed by a three-member board of trustees, who are elected in November of odd-numbered years to a four-year term beginning on the following January 1. Two are elected in the year after the presidential election and one is elected in the year before it. There is also an elected township fiscal officer, who serves a four-year term beginning on April 1 of the year after the election, which is held in November of the year before the presidential election. Vacancies in the fiscal officership or on the board of trustees are filled by the remaining trustees.
