= Coal Hill, Ohio =

Extinct town in Ohio, U.S.

Coordinates: 39°47′30″N 81°43′07″W

Coal Hill is an extinct town in Muskingum County, in the U.S. state of Ohio. The GNIS classifies it as a populated place.

== History ==
A post office called Coal Hill was established in 1874, and remained in operation until 1895. Besides the post office, Coal Hill had a country store.
