= Young Hickory, Ohio =

Unincorporated community in Ohio, U.S.

Coordinates: 39°46′46″N 81°44′57″W

Young Hickory is an unincorporated community in Muskingum County, in the U.S. state of Ohio.

== History ==
A former variant name of Young Hickory was Meigsville. Meigsville was laid out in 1840. A post office called Young Hickory was established in 1846, and remained in operation until 1902.
