= Freeland, Ohio =

Unincorporated community in Muskingum County, Ohio, United States

Coordinates: 39°52′52″N 81°46′31″W

Freeland is an unincorporated community in Muskingum County, in the U.S. state of Ohio.

== History ==
A post office was established at Freeland in 1874, and remained in operation until 1918. The post office was originally housed in a local store.
