= Sundale, Ohio =

U.S. unincorporated community

Coordinates: 39°58′40″N 81°47′32″W

Sundale is an unincorporated community in Muskingum County, in the U.S. state of Ohio.

== History ==
A post office called Sun Dale was established in 1880, and remained in operation until 1920. Besides the post office, Sundale had a railroad depot.
