= Ellis, Ohio =

Unincorporated community in Ohio, U.S.

Coordinates: 40°02′46″N 81°58′58″W

Ellis is an unincorporated community in Muskingum County, in the U.S. state of Ohio.

== History ==
Ellis was founded in 1870 as Ellis Station, a depot on the Cincinnati and Muskingum Valley railroad. The community was named for the local Ellis family. A post office called Ellis was established in 1879, and remained in operation until 1935.
