= North Zanesville, Ohio =

- Census-designated place
- Location within Ohio Location within the United States
- Coordinates: 39°59′44″N 82°00′04″W
- Country: United States
- State: Ohio
- County: Muskingum
- Township: Falls

Area
  - Total: 3.55 sq mi (9.20 km^{2})
  - Land: 3.55 sq mi (9.19 km^{2})
  - Water: 0.0039 sq mi (0.01 km^{2})
- Elevation: 863 ft (263 m)

Population (2020)
  - Total: 3,116
  - Density: 877.8/sq mi (338.91/km^{2})
- Time zone: UTC-5 (Eastern (EST))
  - Summer (DST): UTC-4 (EDT)
- ZIP Code: 43701 (Zanesville)
- FIPS code: 39-57218
- GNIS feature ID: 2393156

North Zanesville is an unincorporated community and census-designated place (CDP) in Muskingum County, Ohio, United States, just north of the city of Zanesville, along the Muskingum River. The population was 3,116 at the 2020 census, up from 2,816 in 2010.

== Geography ==
North Zanesville is in central Muskingum County, in the northeastern part of Falls Township. It is bordered to the south and west by the city of Zanesville, the county seat. According to the U.S. Census Bureau, the CDP has a total area of 3.553 square miles (9.202 km^{2}), of which 0.003 square miles (0.008 km^{2}), or 0.08%, are water. The community sits on high ground which drains east toward the Muskingum River and west toward Joes Run, a tributary of the Licking River, which joins the Muskingum in Zanesville.

== Demographics ==
Historical population
Census	Pop.	Note	%±
1950	1,544		—
1960	2,201		42.6%
1970	3,399		54.4%
1990	2,121		—
2000	3,013		42.1%
2010	2,816		−6.5%
2020	3,116		10.7%
U.S. Decennial Census

=== 2020 census ===
As of the 2020 census, North Zanesville had a population of 3,116. The median age was 50.0 years. 17.9% of residents were under the age of 18 and 27.6% of residents were 65 years of age or older. For every 100 females there were 91.2 males, and for every 100 females age 18 and over there were 89.6 males age 18 and over.

89.2% of residents lived in urban areas, while 10.8% lived in rural areas.

There were 1,340 households in North Zanesville, of which 23.7% had children under the age of 18 living in them. Of all households, 54.9% were married-couple households, 12.2% were households with a male householder and no spouse or partner present, and 26.0% were households with a female householder and no spouse or partner present. About 25.5% of all households were made up of individuals and 13.8% had someone living alone who was 65 years of age or older.

There were 1,421 housing units, of which 5.7% were vacant. The homeowner vacancy rate was 1.9% and the rental vacancy rate was 3.1%.

Racial composition as of the 2020 census
Race	Number	Percent
White	2,837	91.0%
Black or African American	74	2.4%
American Indian and Alaska Native	3	0.1%
Asian	59	1.9%
Native Hawaiian and Other Pacific Islander	0	0.0%
Some other race	9	0.3%
Two or more races	134	4.3%
Hispanic or Latino (of any race)	27	0.9%

=== 2000 census ===
As of the census of 2000, there were 3,013 people, 1,223 households, and 917 families residing in the CDP. The population density was 838.8 inhabitants per square mile (323.9/km^{2}). There were 1,262 housing units at an average density of 351.4 per square mile (135.7/km^{2}). The racial makeup of the CDP was 95.65% White, 1.76% African American, 0.07% Native American, 1.49% Asian, 0.23% from other races, and 0.80% from two or more races. Hispanic or Latino of any race were 0.40% of the population.

There were 1,223 households, out of which 28.1% had children under the age of 18 living with them, 65.7% were married couples living together, 7.0% had a female householder with no husband present, and 25.0% were non-families. 21.5% of all households were made up of individuals, and 11.4% had someone living alone who was 65 years of age or older. The average household size was 2.46 and the average family size was 2.86.

In the CDP, the population was spread out, with 23.2% under the age of 18, 4.9% from 18 to 24, 23.1% from 25 to 44, 27.3% from 45 to 64, and 21.5% who were 65 years of age or older. The median age was 44 years. For every 100 females, there were 87.8 males. For every 100 females age 18 and over, there were 86.1 males.

The median income for a household in the CDP was $51,306, and the median income for a family was $57,684. Males had a median income of $41,838 versus $30,625 for females. The per capita income for the CDP was $25,075. About 3.5% of families and 5.2% of the population were below the poverty line, including 6.5% of those under age 18 and 3.0% of those age 65 or over.
