= Hopewell, Muskingum County, Ohio =

Unincorporated community in Ohio, U.S.

Coordinates: 39°57′20″N 82°10′15″W

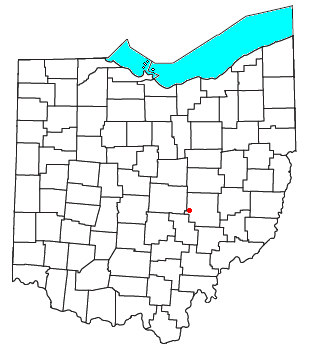
Location of Hopewell in Muskingum County, Ohio

Hopewell is an unincorporated community in central Hopewell Township, Muskingum County, Ohio, United States.

The community is situated on U.S. Route 40, about a half mile north of Interstate 70, and about nine miles west of Zanesville at 39°57'21" north latitude, 82°10'15" west longitude. The ZIP code is 43746; the FIPS place code is 36358; and the elevation 1100 feet above sea level.

Hopewell had its start when the National Road was extended to that point. The community takes its name from Hopewell Township. A post office called Hopewell was established in 1830. The post office was moved to nearby Mount Sterling at an unknown date where it retained the name Hopewell. By 1833, Hopewell had 75 inhabitants.
