= Zeno, Ohio =

Extinct town in Ohio, U.S.

Coordinates: 39°47′54″N 81°44′00″W

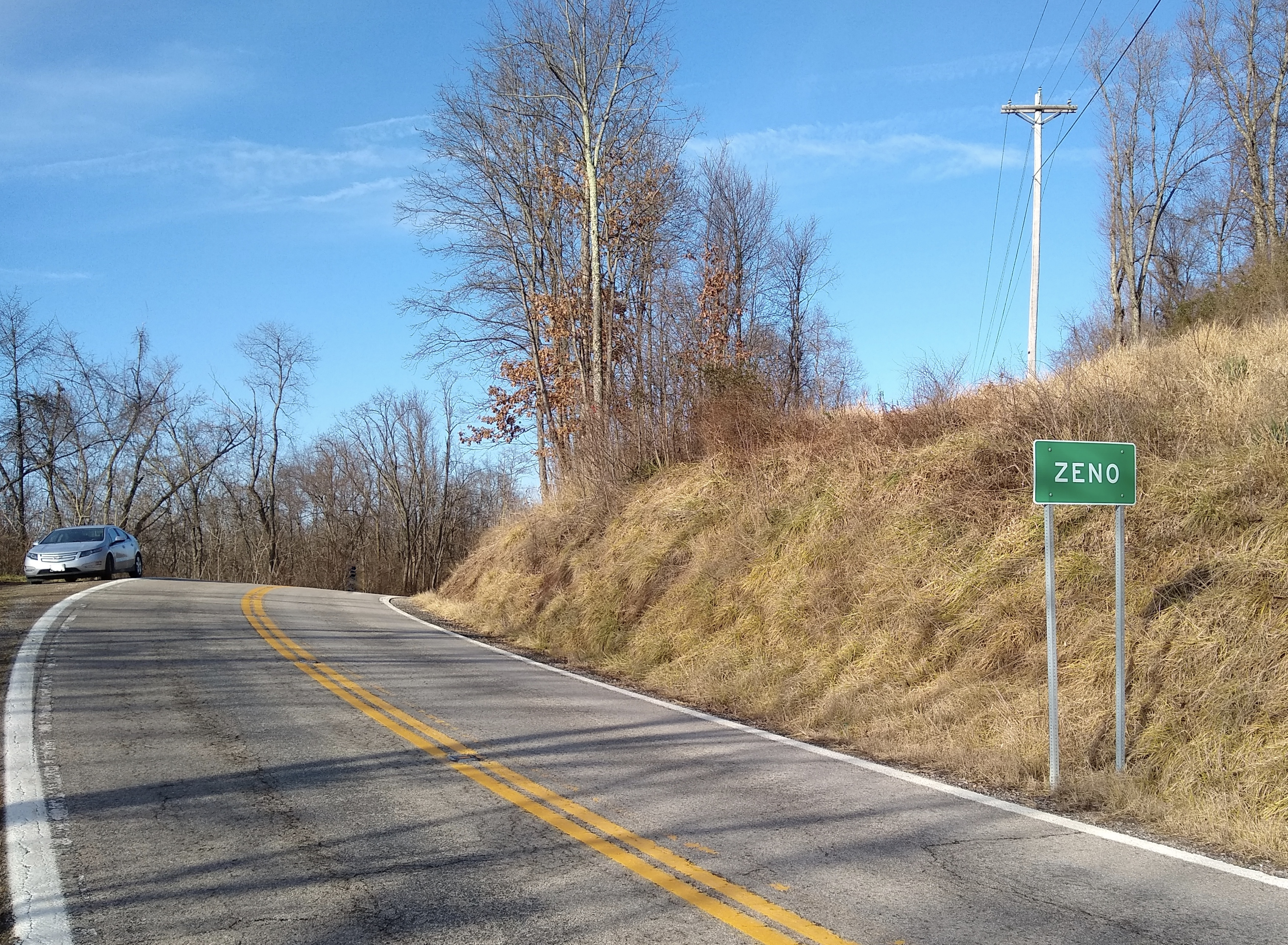
Sign on the southern entrance to Zeno

Zeno is an extinct town in Meigs Township, Muskingum County, Ohio.

== History ==
A post office called Zeno was established in 1862, and remained in operation until 1902. The town also had a country store and a high school.

== Notable residents ==
- J. R. Clifford, who became West Virginia's first African-American attorney
