= Hopewell Township, Muskingum County, Ohio =

Township in Ohio, US

- Township
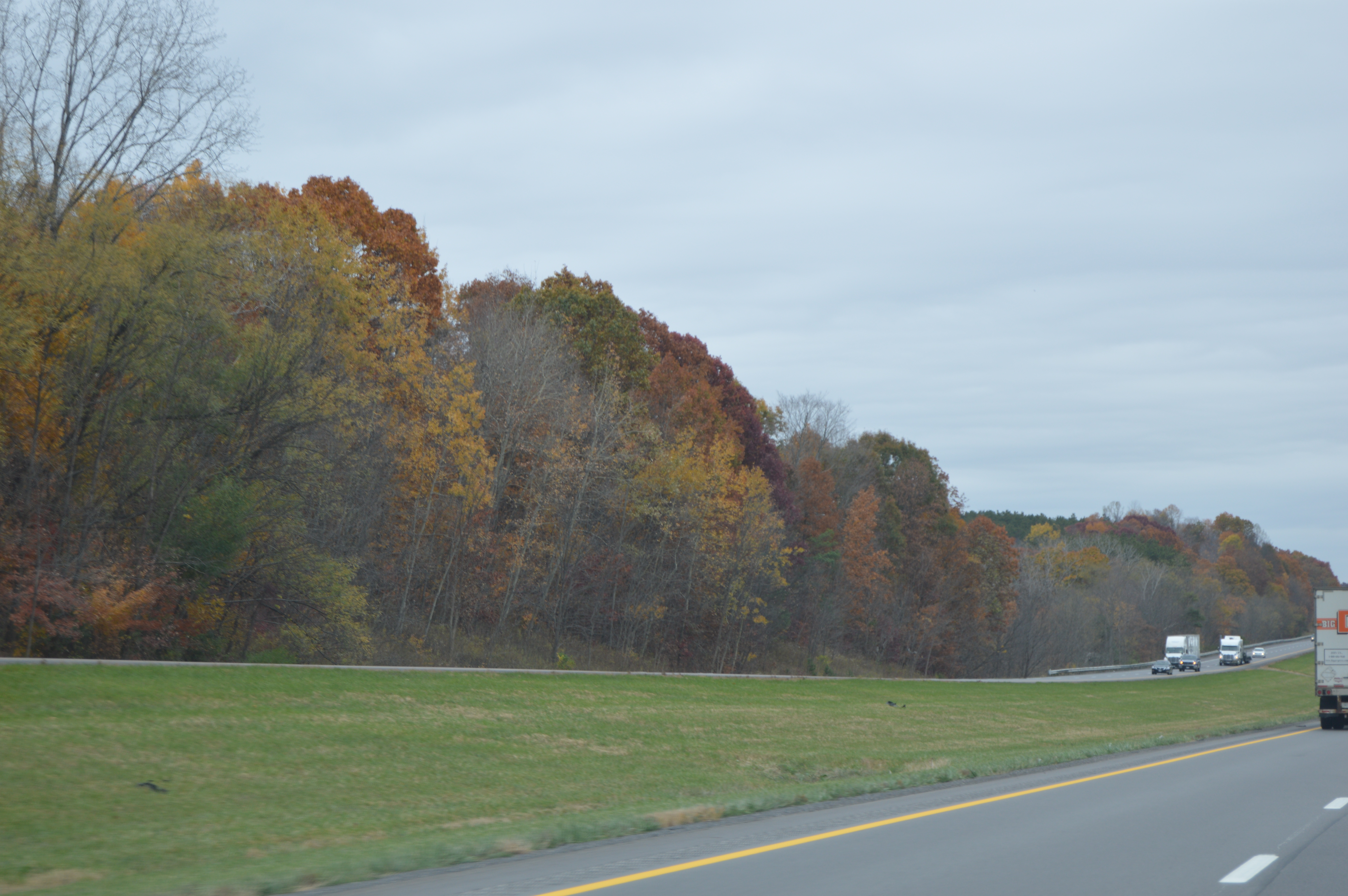
- Interstate 70 southeast of Hopewell

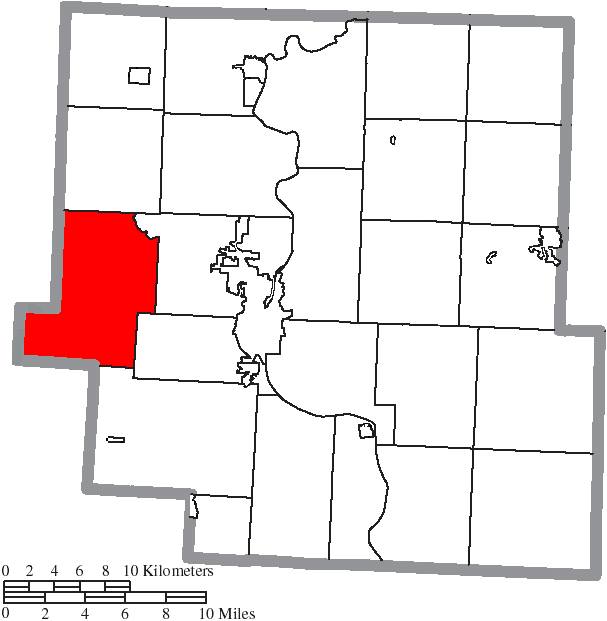
- Location of Hopewell Township in Muskingum County
- Coordinates: 39°57′16″N 82°10′57″W
- Country: United States
- State: Ohio
- County: Muskingum

Area
  - Total: 38.8 sq mi (100.5 km^{2})
  - Land: 38.3 sq mi (99.3 km^{2})
  - Water: 0.46 sq mi (1.2 km^{2})
- Elevation: 968 ft (295 m)

Population (2020)
  - Total: 3,193
  - Density: 83.3/sq mi (32.2/km^{2})
- Time zone: UTC-5 (Eastern (EST))
  - Summer (DST): UTC-4 (EDT)
- ZIP code: 43746
- Area code: 740
- FIPS code: 39-36372
- GNIS feature ID: 1086721

Hopewell Township is one of the twenty-five townships of Muskingum County, Ohio, United States. The 2020 census found 3,193 people in the township.

== Geography ==
Located on the western edge of the county, it borders the following townships:

- Licking Township - north
- Falls Township - east, north of Springfield Township
- Springfield Township - east, south of Falls Township
- Newton Township - southeast
- Madison Township, Perry County - south
- Hopewell Township, Perry County - southwest corner
- Bowling Green Township, Licking County - west, south of Hopewell Township
- Hopewell Township, Licking County - west, north of Bowling Green Township
- Hanover Township, Licking County - northwest corner

Part of the village of Gratiot is located in western Hopewell Township, and the unincorporated community of Hopewell lies at the center of the township.

== Name and history ==
It is one of five Hopewell Townships statewide.

Hopewell Township was described in 1833 as having four churches and three physicians.

== Government ==
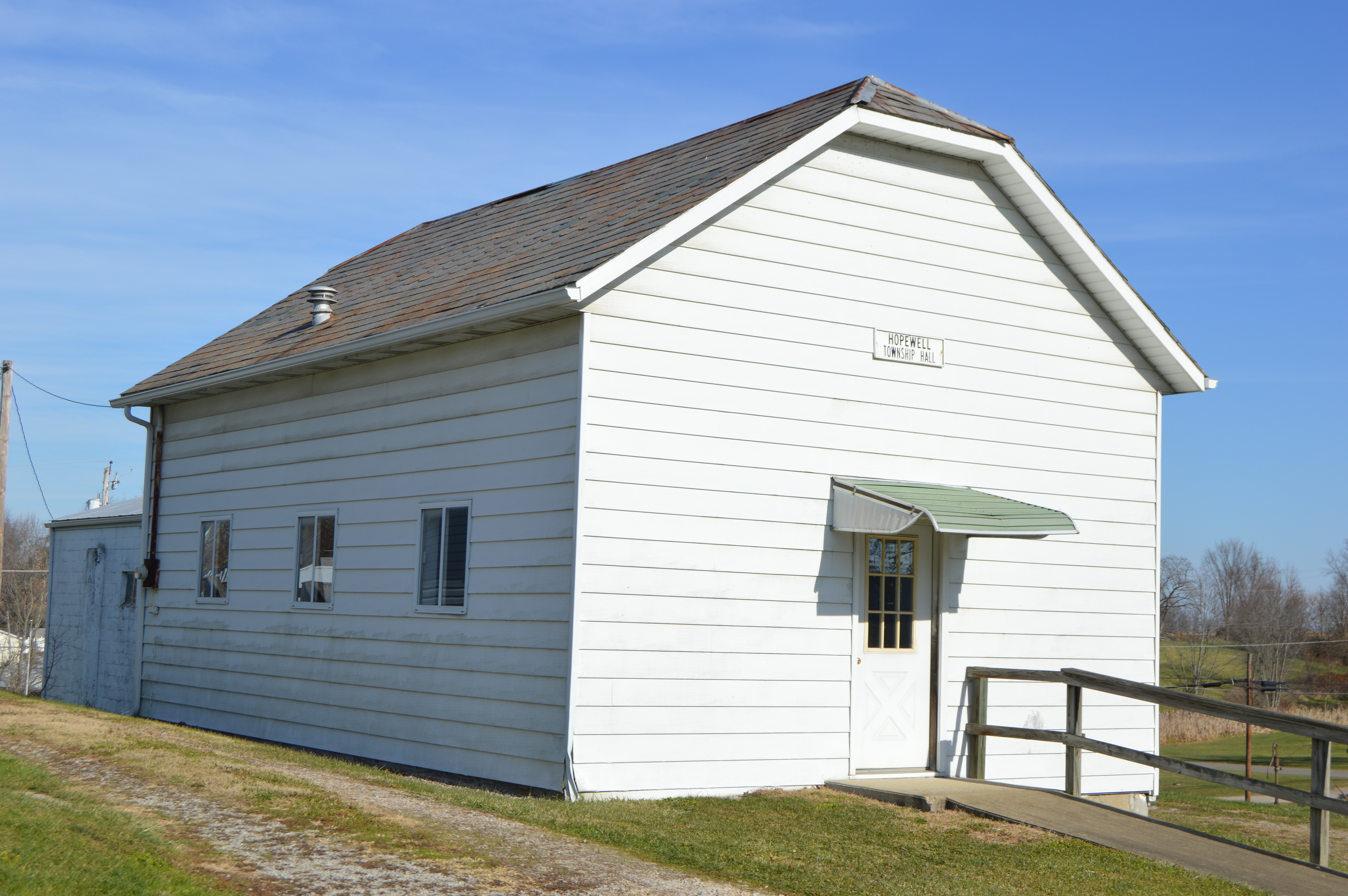
Township hall at Mount Sterling

The township is governed by a three-member board of trustees, who are elected in November of odd-numbered years to a four-year term beginning on the following January 1. Two are elected in the year after the presidential election and one is elected in the year before it. There is also an elected township fiscal officer, who serves a four-year term beginning on April 1 of the year after the election, which is held in November of the year before the presidential election. Vacancies in the fiscal officership or on the board of trustees are filled by the remaining trustees.
