= Irville, Ohio =

Unincorporated community in Ohio, U.S.

Coordinates: 40°02′57″N 82°07′38″W

Irville is an unincorporated community in Muskingum County, in the U.S. state of Ohio.

== History ==
Irville was laid out in 1815 by John Irvine, and named for him. A post office called Irville was established in 1816, and remained in operation until 1902.
