= Meadow Farm, Ohio =

Unincorporated community in Ohio, U.S.

Coordinates: 39°54′51″N 82°06′20″W

Meadow Farm is an unincorporated community in Muskingum County, in the U.S. state of Ohio.

== History ==
A post office called Meadow Farm was established in 1840 and remained in operation until 1863. Besides the post office, Meadow Farm had a Protestant church.
