= Philo, Ohio =

- Village
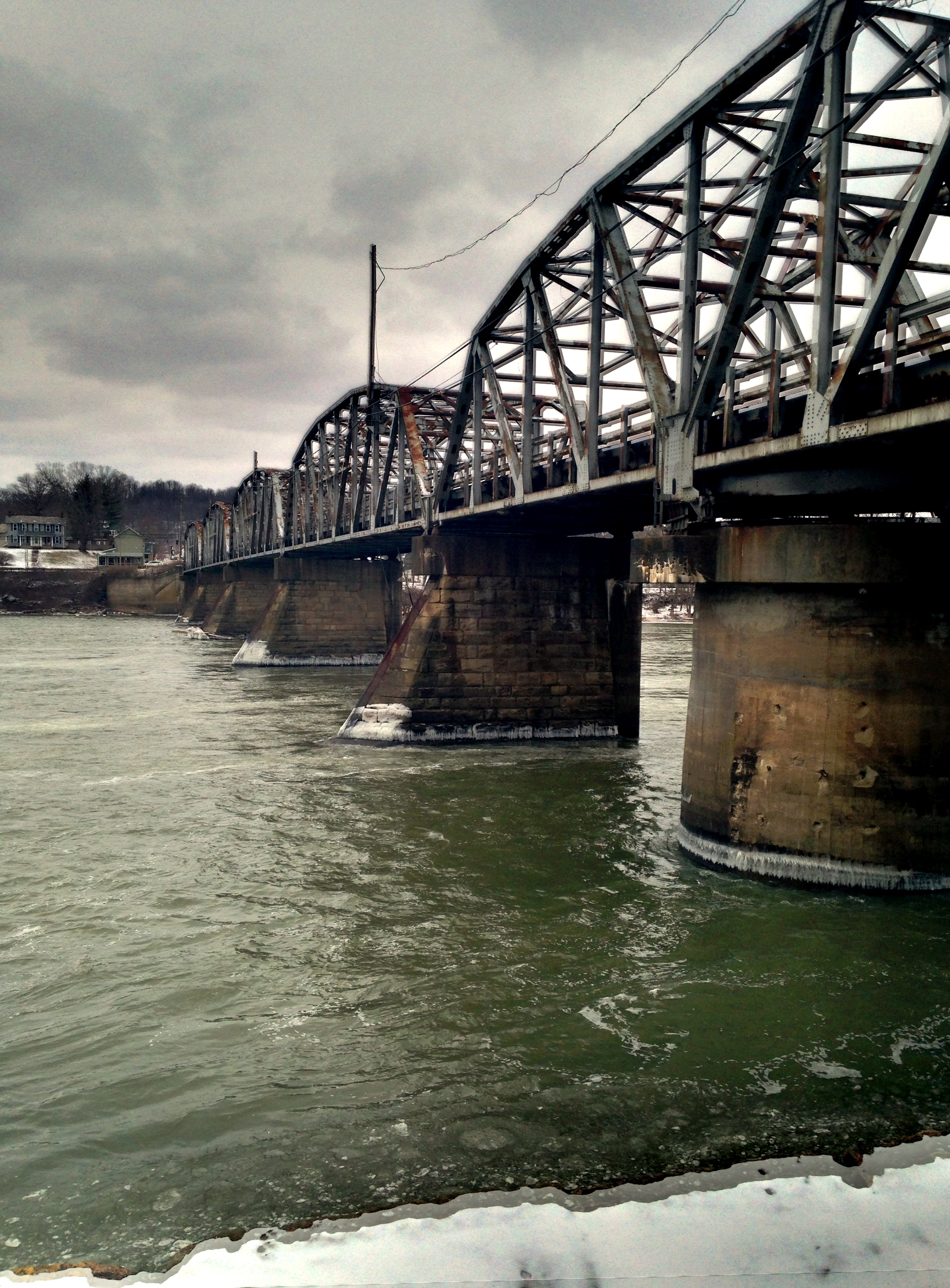
- The previous bridge to Duncan Falls

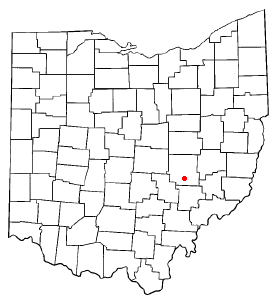
- Location of Philo, Ohio

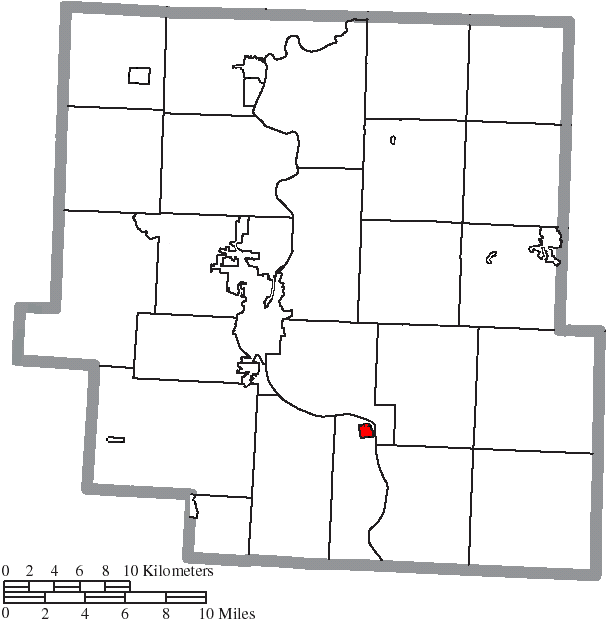
- Location of Philo in Muskingum County
- Coordinates: 39°51′41″N 81°54′32″W
- Country: United States
- State: Ohio
- County: Muskingum
- Township: Harrison

Area
  - Total: 0.51 sq mi (1.33 km^{2})
  - Land: 0.51 sq mi (1.33 km^{2})
  - Water: 0 sq mi (0.00 km^{2})
- Elevation: 755 ft (230 m)

Population (2020)
  - Total: 720
  - Density: 1,405.3/sq mi (542.58/km^{2})
- Time zone: UTC-5 (Eastern (EST))
  - Summer (DST): UTC-4 (EDT)
- ZIP code: 43771
- Area code: 740
- FIPS code: 39-62442
- GNIS feature ID: 2399665

Philo (/ˈfaɪloʊ/ FY-loh) is a village in Muskingum County, Ohio, United States, along the Muskingum River. The population was 720 at the 2020 census. It is part of the Zanesville micropolitan area. Philo is the closest municipality to Blue Rock State Park.

== History ==
An old variant name was Taylorsville. Taylorsville was laid out in 1833 by James Taylor, and named for him. A post office called Philo has been in operation since 1851. The present name is for Philo Buckingham, an early settler.

From 1924 to 1975, the Philo Power Plant generated electric power. In 1957 Unit 6 at the Philo Power plant was the first commercial supercritical steam-electric generating unit in the world. Today, the rotors from Philo 6 are on display as a sculpture created by George Greenamyer located at the AEP Building in Columbus, Ohio.

== Geography ==
According to the United States Census Bureau, the village has a total area of 0.42 square miles (1.09 km^{2}), all land.

== Demographics ==
Historical population
Census	Pop.	Note	%±
1850	634		—
1860	500		−21.1%
1870	544		8.8%
1880	501		−7.9%
1890	631		25.9%
1900	543		−13.9%
1910	495		−8.8%
1920	417		−15.8%
1930	804		92.8%
1940	884		10.0%
1950	881		−0.3%
1960	913		3.6%
1970	846		−7.3%
1980	799		−5.6%
1990	810		1.4%
2000	769		−5.1%
2010	733		−4.7%
2020	720		−1.8%
U.S. Decennial Census

=== 2010 census ===
As of the census of 2010, there were 733 people, 278 households, and 194 families living in the village. The population density was 1,745.2 inhabitants per square mile (673.8/km^{2}). There were 320 housing units at an average density of 761.9 per square mile (294.2/km^{2}). The racial makeup of the village was 97.8% White, 0.8% African American, 0.1% Asian, 0.1% from other races, and 1.1% from two or more races. Hispanic or Latino of any race were 0.7% of the population.

There were 278 households, of which 41.7% had children under the age of 18 living with them, 53.6% were married couples living together, 11.2% had a female householder with no husband present, 5.0% had a male householder with no wife present, and 30.2% were non-families. 24.5% of all households were made up of individuals, and 12.6% had someone living alone who was 65 years of age or older. The average household size was 2.64 and the average family size was 3.14.

The median age in the village was 33.8 years. 29.7% of residents were under the age of 18; 8.3% were between the ages of 18 and 24; 25.9% were from 25 to 44; 23.8% were from 45 to 64; and 12.3% were 65 years of age or older. The gender makeup of the village was 48.3% male and 51.7% female.

=== 2000 census ===
As of the census of 2000, there were 769 people, 284 households, and 201 families living in the village. The population density was 1,837.8 inhabitants per square mile (709.6/km^{2}). There were 313 housing units at an average density of 748.0 per square mile (288.8/km^{2}). The racial makeup of the village was 98.31% White, 0.39% African American, 0.13% Native American, 0.13% Asian, 0.52% Pacific Islander, and 0.52% from two or more races. Hispanic or Latino of any race were 0.13% of the population.

There were 284 households, out of which 38.0% had children under the age of 18 living with them, 53.5% were married couples living together, 13.7% had a female householder with no husband present, and 28.9% were non-families. 24.6% of all households were made up of individuals, and 14.1% had someone living alone who was 65 years of age or older. The average household size was 2.71 and the average family size was 3.25.

In the village, the population was spread out, with 32.5% under the age of 18, 6.9% from 18 to 24, 29.9% from 25 to 44, 17.9% from 45 to 64, and 12.7% who were 65 years of age or older. The median age was 34 years. For every 100 females there were 88.5 males. For every 100 females age 18 and over, there were 86.7 males.

The median income for a household in the village was $31,346, and the median income for a family was $35,938. Males had a median income of $27,039 versus $20,000 for females. The per capita income for the village was $17,057. About 12.5% of families and 15.5% of the population were below the poverty line, including 22.4% of those under age 18 and 10.6% of those age 65 or over.
