= Blue Rock Township, Ohio =

Township in Ohio, US

Blue Rock Township, Muskingum, Ohio
- Township
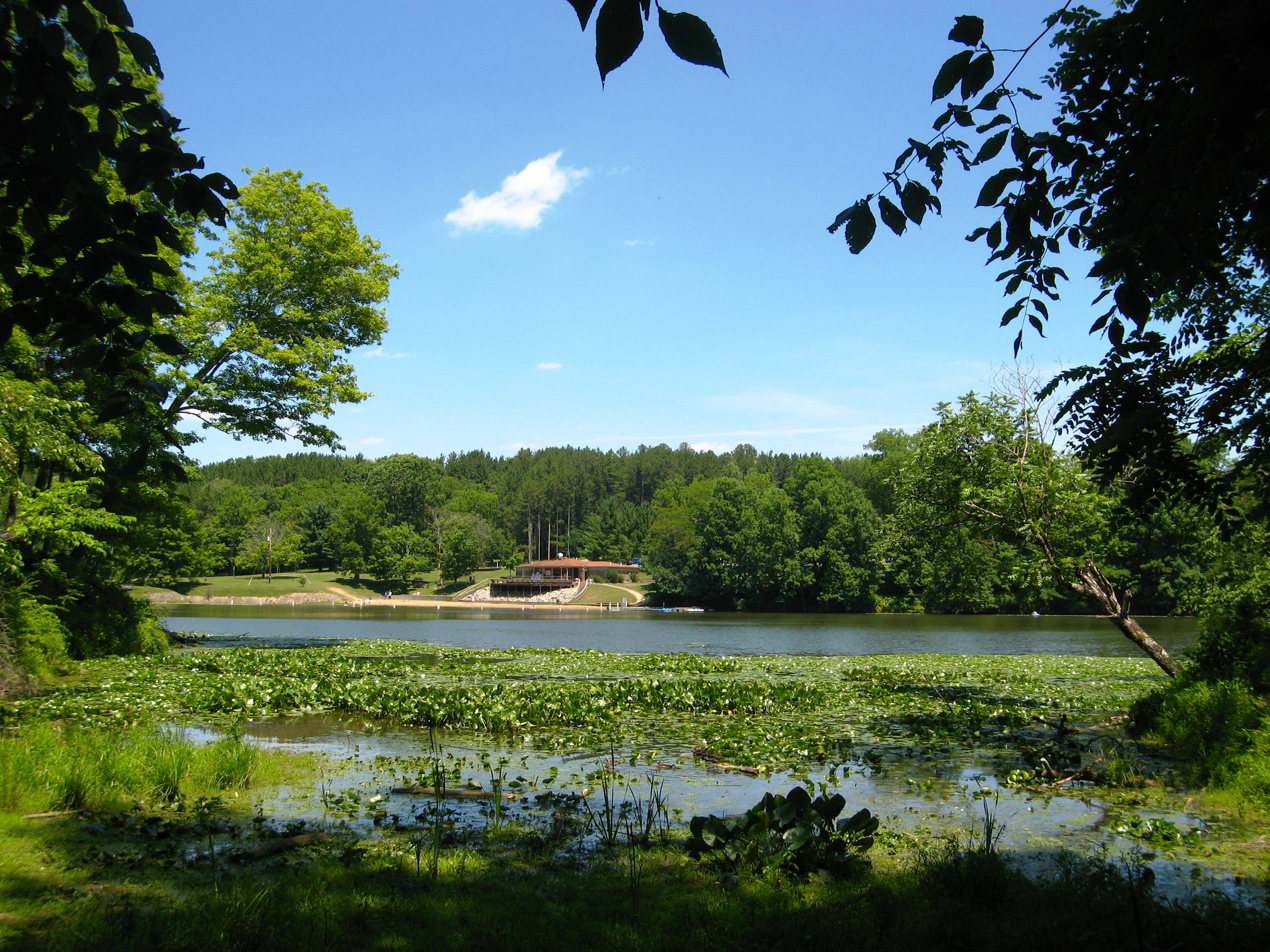
- Cutler Lake at Blue Rock State Park

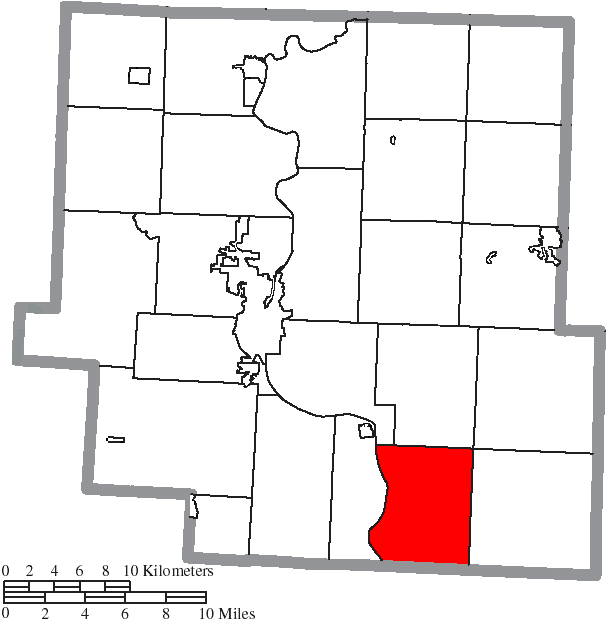
- Location of Blue Rock Township in Muskingum County
- Coordinates: 39°48′47″N 81°51′3″W
- Country: United States
- State: Ohio
- County: Muskingum

Area
  - Total: 27.3 sq mi (70.7 km^{2})
  - Land: 27.0 sq mi (70.0 km^{2})
  - Water: 0.27 sq mi (0.7 km^{2})
- Elevation: 1,060 ft (323 m)

Population (2020)
  - Total: 622
  - Density: 23.0/sq mi (8.89/km^{2})
- Time zone: UTC-5 (Eastern (EST))
  - Summer (DST): UTC-4 (EDT)
- ZIP code: 43720
- Area code: 740
- FIPS code: 39-07398
- GNIS feature ID: 1086714

Blue Rock Township is one of the twenty-five townships of Muskingum County, Ohio, United States. The 2020 census found 622 people in the township.

== Geography ==
Located on the southern edge of the county, it borders the following townships:

- Salt Creek Township - north
- Rich Hill Township - northeast corner
- Meigs Township - east
- Bristol Township, Morgan County - southeast corner
- Bloom Township, Morgan County - south
- Harrison Township - west
- Wayne Township - northwest

No municipalities are located in Blue Rock Township, although the unincorporated community of Blue Rock lies in the western part of the township.

== Name and history ==
Blue Rock Township took its name from Blue Rock Creek. It is the only Blue Rock Township statewide.

By the 1830s, Blue Rock Township had a sawmill and at least ten salt factories.

== Government ==
The township is governed by a three-member board of trustees, who are elected in November of odd-numbered years to a four-year term beginning on the following January 1. Two are elected in the year after the presidential election and one is elected in the year before it. There is also an elected township fiscal officer, who serves a four-year term beginning on April 1 of the year after the election, which is held in November of the year before the presidential election. Vacancies in the fiscal officership or on the board of trustees are filled by the remaining trustees.
