= Gilbert, Ohio =

Unincorporated community in Ohio, U.S.

Coordinates: 40°01′17″N 81°58′35″W

Gilbert is an unincorporated community in Muskingum County, in the U.S. state of Ohio.

== History ==
An old variant name was Gilbert Station. Gilbert Station had its start as a railroad town, and was named after Gilbert Beatty. A post office called Gilbert was established in 1873, and remained in operation until 1934.
