= Darlington, Ohio =

Unincorporated community in Ohio, U.S.

Coordinates: 39°52′51″N 82°2′0″W

Darlington is an unincorporated community in Muskingum County, in the U.S. state of Ohio.

== History ==
The post office at Darlington was called Newton. The Newton post office was established in 1834, and remained in operation until 1897.
