= Sonora, Ohio =

Unincorporated community in Ohio, U.S.

Coordinates: 39°59′03″N 81°54′15″W

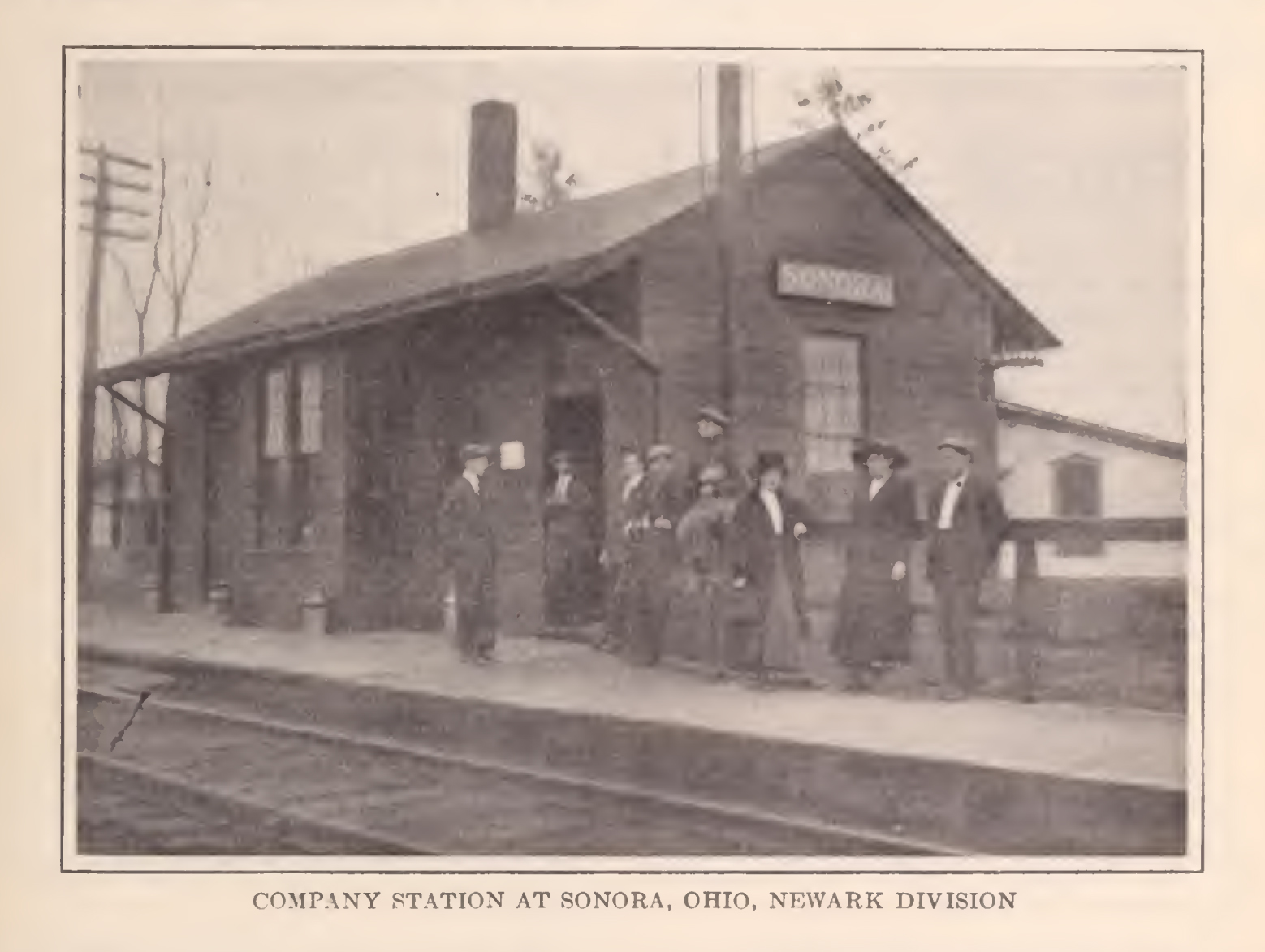
Baltimore & Ohio Railroad Station, Sonora, Ohio, circa 1914

Sonora is an unincorporated community in Muskingum County, in the U.S. state of Ohio.

== History ==
Sonora was laid out in 1852. A post office called Sonora was established in 1855, and remained in operation until 1988.
