= Wayne Township, Muskingum County, Ohio =

Township in Ohio, US

- Township
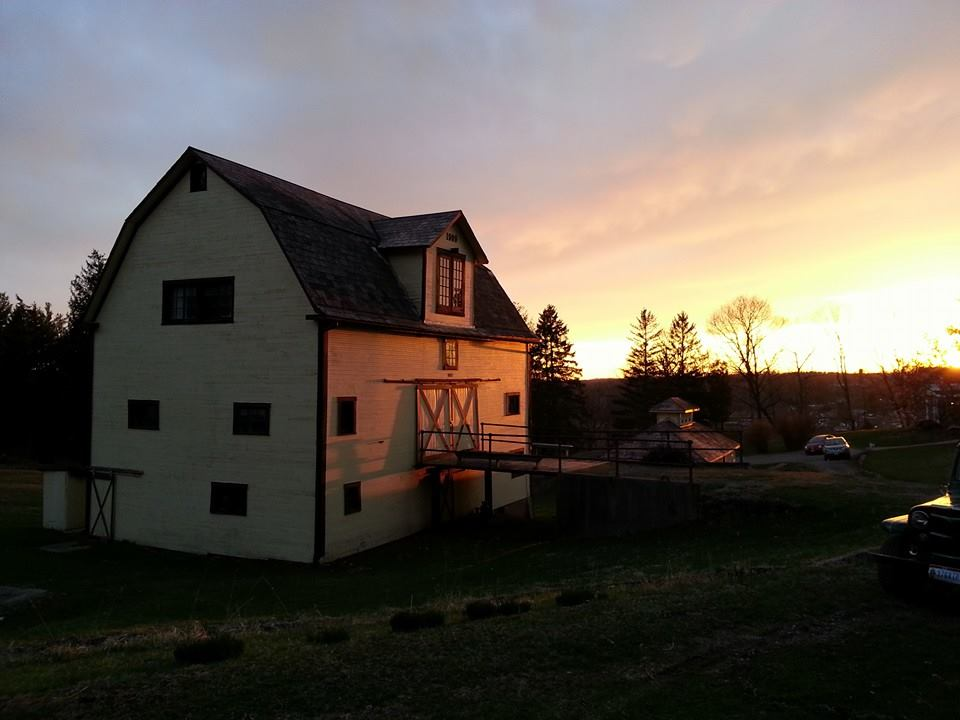
- Art studio of Howard Chandler Christy

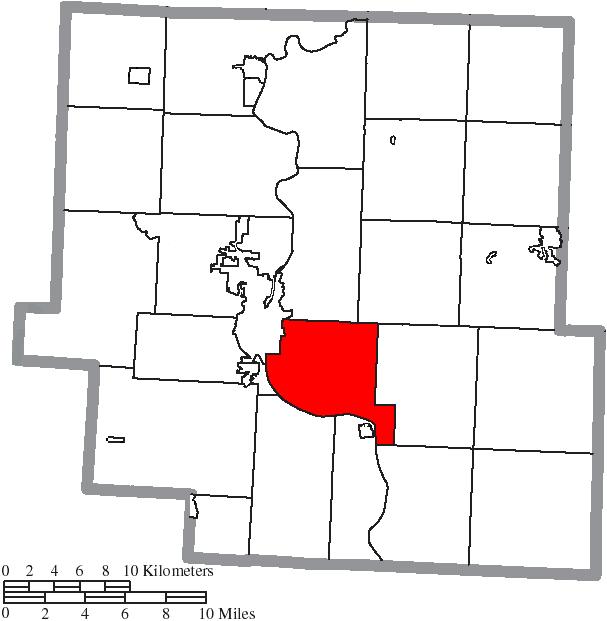
- Location of Wayne Township in Muskingum County
- Coordinates: 39°53′49″N 81°55′55″W
- Country: United States
- State: Ohio
- County: Muskingum

Area
  - Total: 24.6 sq mi (63.7 km^{2})
  - Land: 24.2 sq mi (62.8 km^{2})
  - Water: 0.35 sq mi (0.9 km^{2})
- Elevation: 896 ft (273 m)

Population (2020)
  - Total: 4,892
  - Density: 202/sq mi (77.9/km^{2})
- Time zone: UTC-5 (Eastern (EST))
  - Summer (DST): UTC-4 (EDT)
- FIPS code: 39-82236
- GNIS feature ID: 1086737
- Website: https://waynetownship-oh.org/

Wayne Township is one of the twenty-five townships of Muskingum County, Ohio, United States. The 2020 census found 4,892 people in the township.

== Geography ==
Located in the south central part of the county, it borders the following townships:

- Washington Township - north
- Perry Township - northeast
- Salt Creek Township - east
- Blue Rock Township - southeast
- Harrison Township - south
- Brush Creek Township - southwest
- Springfield Township - west
- Falls Township - northwest corner

No municipalities are located in Wayne Township, although the census-designated place of Duncan Falls lies in the southeastern part of the township.

== Name and history ==
Wayne Township was named for Anthony Wayne. It is one of twenty Wayne Townships statewide.

By the 1830s, Wayne Township had a church and two salt works.

== Government ==
The township is governed by a three-member board of trustees, who are elected in November of odd-numbered years to a four-year term beginning on the following January 1. Two are elected in the year after the presidential election and one is elected in the year before it. There is also an elected township fiscal officer, who serves a four-year term beginning on April 1 of the year after the election, which is held in November of the year before the presidential election. Vacancies in the fiscal officership or on the board of trustees are filled by the remaining trustees.
