= Duncan Falls, Ohio =

CDP in Ohio, USA

- Census-designated place
- Location within Ohio Location within the United States
- Coordinates: 39°52′26″N 81°54′37″W
- Country: United States
- State: Ohio
- County: Muskingum
- Township: Wayne

Area
  - Total: 1.32 sq mi (3.4 km^{2})
  - Land: 1.24 sq mi (3.2 km^{2})
  - Water: 0.08 sq mi (0.21 km^{2})
- Elevation: 745 ft (227 m)

Population (2020)
  - Total: 898
  - Density: 724.2/sq mi (279.6/km^{2})
- Time zone: UTC-5 (Eastern (EST))
  - Summer (DST): UTC-4 (EDT)
- ZIP Code: 43734
- FIPS code: 39-22820
- GNIS feature ID: 2628885

Duncan Falls is an unincorporated community and census-designated place (CDP) in Wayne Township, Muskingum County, Ohio, United States, located on State Route 60 south of the city of Zanesville. It has a post office with the ZIP Code 43734. The population was 898 at the 2020 census.

== History ==
Duncan Falls is named for an early hunter and trapper by the name of Major Duncan, who emigrated from Virginia and settled near a falls on the Muskingum River, approximately 9 miles (14 km) south of present-day Zanesville, in the 1790s. He reportedly skirmished with the local Shawnee people over his traps, and according to legend was killed by the Shawnee while attempting to cross the river at the falls. Thus, his name became associated with these falls.

The settlement of the town, initially known as "Duncan's Falls", began with the establishment of a store by James Taylor in 1825. Alanson Holderidge and Justice Depew both erected blacksmith shops around 1828. A tavern was established by Jacob Hall in 1830. James Taylor established a ferry across the Muskingum River at the falls in 1830. Although the county history by Everhart states that a free bridge was constructed across the river by the county government in 1831, the Zanesville Signal reported that the first bridge across the river did not arrive until 1875. James Taylor built a dam at the falls in 1832 to entice millers to settle in the town, and in 1835 the state government improved the dam. In 1838, a four-story flour mill was erected by Lewis Dugan and William Bowen. As the area around the falls was now starting to develop, James Taylor formally platted a townsite in 1841 (Taylor had previously platted Taylorsville, now known as Philo, on the other side of the river in 1833). By the 1840s, the dam and lock system was in place, allowing for steamboat travel, but raising the water level of the river so as to hide the falls.

As of 1882, the town had around 200 inhabitants, including one physician, a Dr. Mason.

Around 1890, an order from the U.S. Postal Service changed the name from Duncan's Falls to Duncan Falls.

In 1896, the original flour mill burned to the ground. It was rebuilt in 1898, and burned again in 1902, and was again rebuilt. The mill was purchased in 1922 by the Ohio Power Company, to acquire its water rights on the river. Ohio Power tore the mill down.

Much of the town was damaged by a severe flood of the Muskingum River in 1913. By the 1920s, steamboat commerce on the river was dying down. The completion of the Philo Power Plant across the river in Philo in 1924 provided a much needed economic lifeline to Duncan Falls, which was furthered by the completion of the Ohio Ferro Alloys Corporation factory in Philo in 1927. The road along the east side of the Muskingum River through Duncan Falls was fully paved in 1933, bringing much highway traffic between Zanesville and Marietta through Duncan Falls (this traffic had previously traveled on a paved route further east that passed through Chandlersville and Caldwell).

== Geography ==
Historical population
Census	Pop.	Note	%±
2010	880		—
2020	898		2.0%
U.S. Decennial Census

Duncan Falls is in southern Muskingum County, in the southeast part of Wayne Township. It is bordered to the south by the Muskingum River, across which is the village of Philo. Ohio State Route 60 passes through Duncan Falls, leading northwest (upriver) 9 miles (14 km) to Zanesville, the county seat, and south (downriver) 19 miles (31 km) to McConnelsville.

According to the U.S. Census Bureau, the Duncan Falls CDP has a total area of 1.32 square miles (3.42 km^{2}), of which 1.24 square miles (3.21 km^{2}) are land and 0.08 square miles (0.21 km^{2}), or 5.85%, are water, comprising area within the Muskingum River. Salt Creek joins the Muskingum from the northeast at the eastern border of the community. Duncan Falls is 60 miles (97 km) up the Muskingum River from its mouth at the Ohio River in Marietta.

== Community ==
Duncan Falls has a public library, a branch of the Muskingum County Library System.
