= Otsego, Muskingum County, Ohio =

Unincorporated community in Ohio, U.S.

Coordinates: 40°07′17″N 81°45′53″W

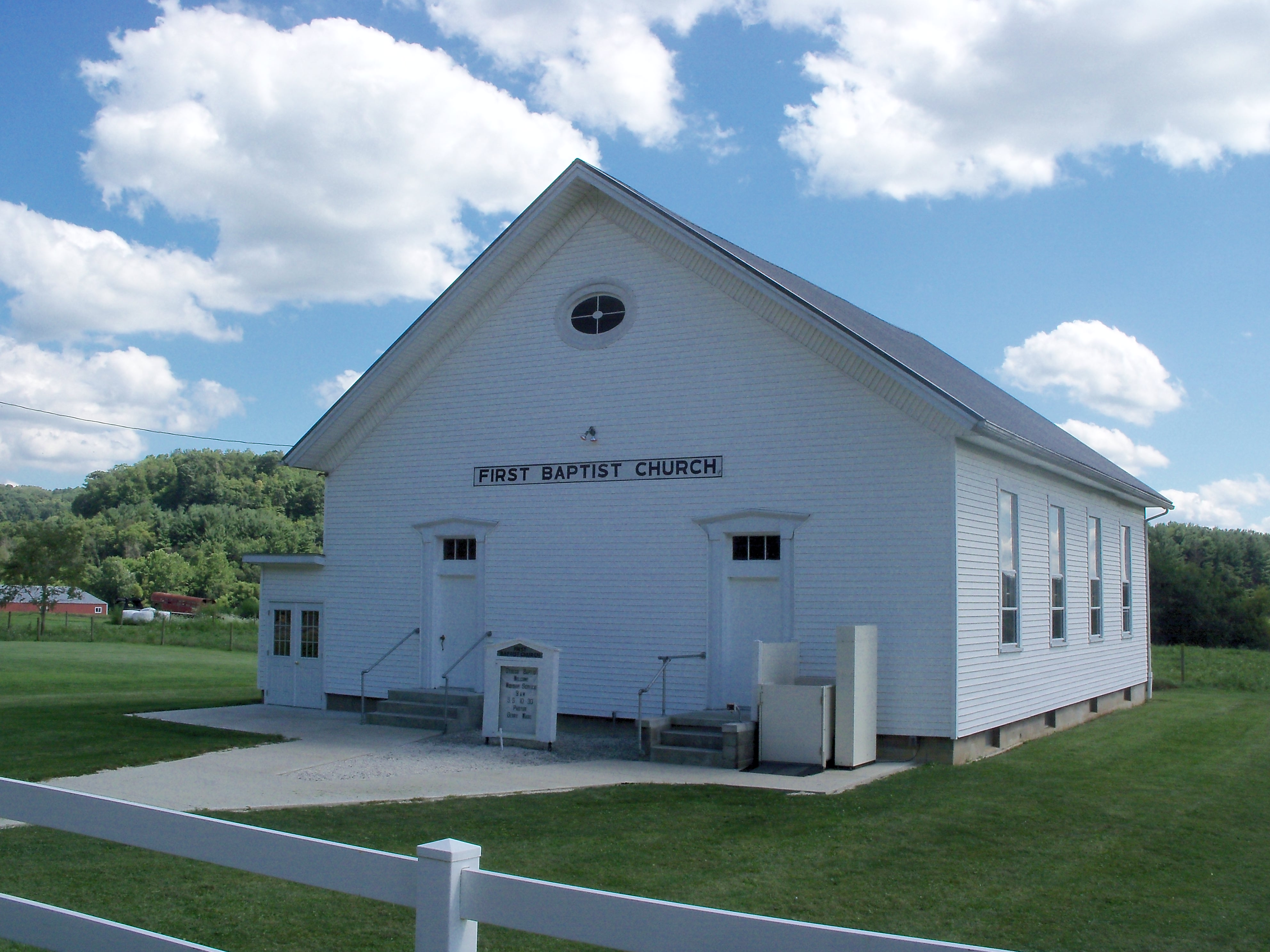
Otsego First Baptist Church

Otsego is an unincorporated community in Muskingum County, in the U.S. state of Ohio.

== History ==
Otsego was laid out in 1838, and named after Otsego, New York. A post office was established at Otsego in 1840, and discontinued in 1963. It lies at the intersection of Route 93 and Route 83
