= Bridgeville, Ohio =

Unincorporated community in Ohio, U.S.

Coordinates: 39°58′10″N 81°52′03″W

Bridgeville is an unincorporated community in Muskingum County, in the U.S. state of Ohio.

== History ==
A post office called Bridgeville was established in 1830, and remained in operation until 1900. The community was named for a nearby bridge on the National Road.
