= Muskingum County, Ohio =

County in Ohio, United States

- County
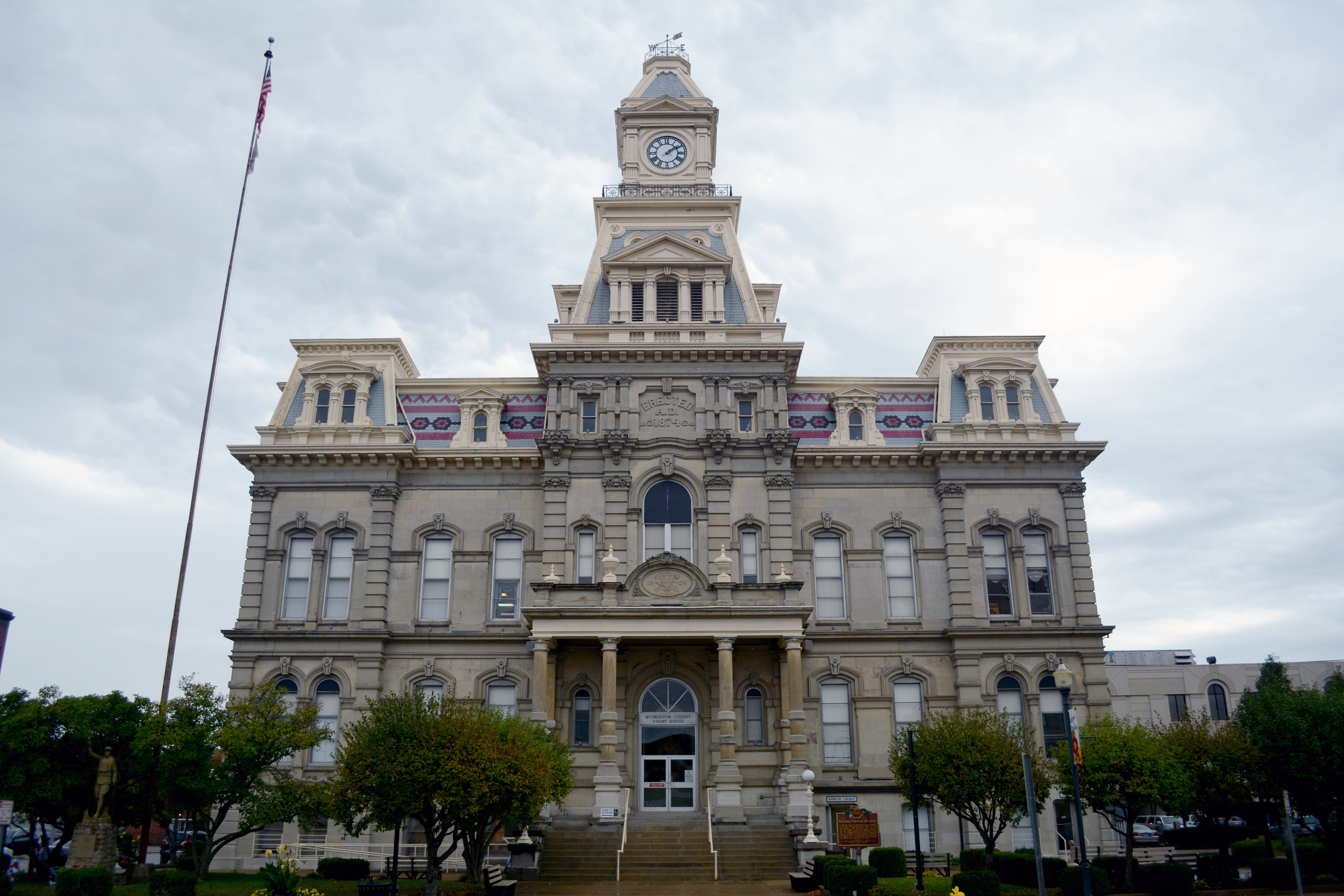
- Muskingum County Courthouse

- Flag Seal

- Location within the U.S. state of Ohio
- Coordinates: 39°58′N 81°57′W
- Country: United States
- State: Ohio
- Founded: March 1, 1804
- Named for: A Native American word meaning "Town by the river"
- Seat: Zanesville
- Largest city: Zanesville

Area
  - Total: 673 sq mi (1,740 km^{2})
  - Land: 665 sq mi (1,720 km^{2})
  - Water: 8.0 sq mi (21 km^{2}) 1.2%

Population (2020)
  - Total: 86,410
  - Estimate (2025): 87,014 ▲
  - Density: 130/sq mi (50/km^{2})
- Time zone: UTC−5 (Eastern)
  - Summer (DST): UTC−4 (EDT)
- Congressional district: 12th
- Website: www.muskingumcountyoh.gov

Muskingum County (/məˈskɪŋ(ɡ)əm/ mə-SKING-(g)əm) is a county located in the east-central portion of the U.S. state of Ohio. As of the 2020 census, the population was 86,410. Its county seat is Zanesville. Nearly bisected by the Muskingum River, the county name is based on a Delaware American Indian word translated as "town by the river" or "elk's eye". Muskingum County comprises the Zanesville, OH Micropolitan Statistical Area, which is also included in the Columbus-Marion-Zanesville, OH Combined Statistical Area. The Zanesville Micropolitan Statistical Area is the second-largest statistical area within the Combined Statistical Area, after the Columbus Metropolitan Statistical Area. The county also comprises the entire Zanesville media market.

== Name ==
The name Muskingum may come from the Shawnee word mshkikwam 'swampy ground'. The name may also be from Lenape "Machkigen," referring to thorns, or a specific species of thorn bush. Muskingum has also been taken to mean 'elk's eye' (mus wəshkinkw) by folk etymology, as in mus 'elk' + wəshkinkw 'its eye'. Moravian missionary David Zeisberger wrote that the Muskingum River was called Elk's Eye "because of the numbers of elk that formerly fed on its banks."

== Geography ==
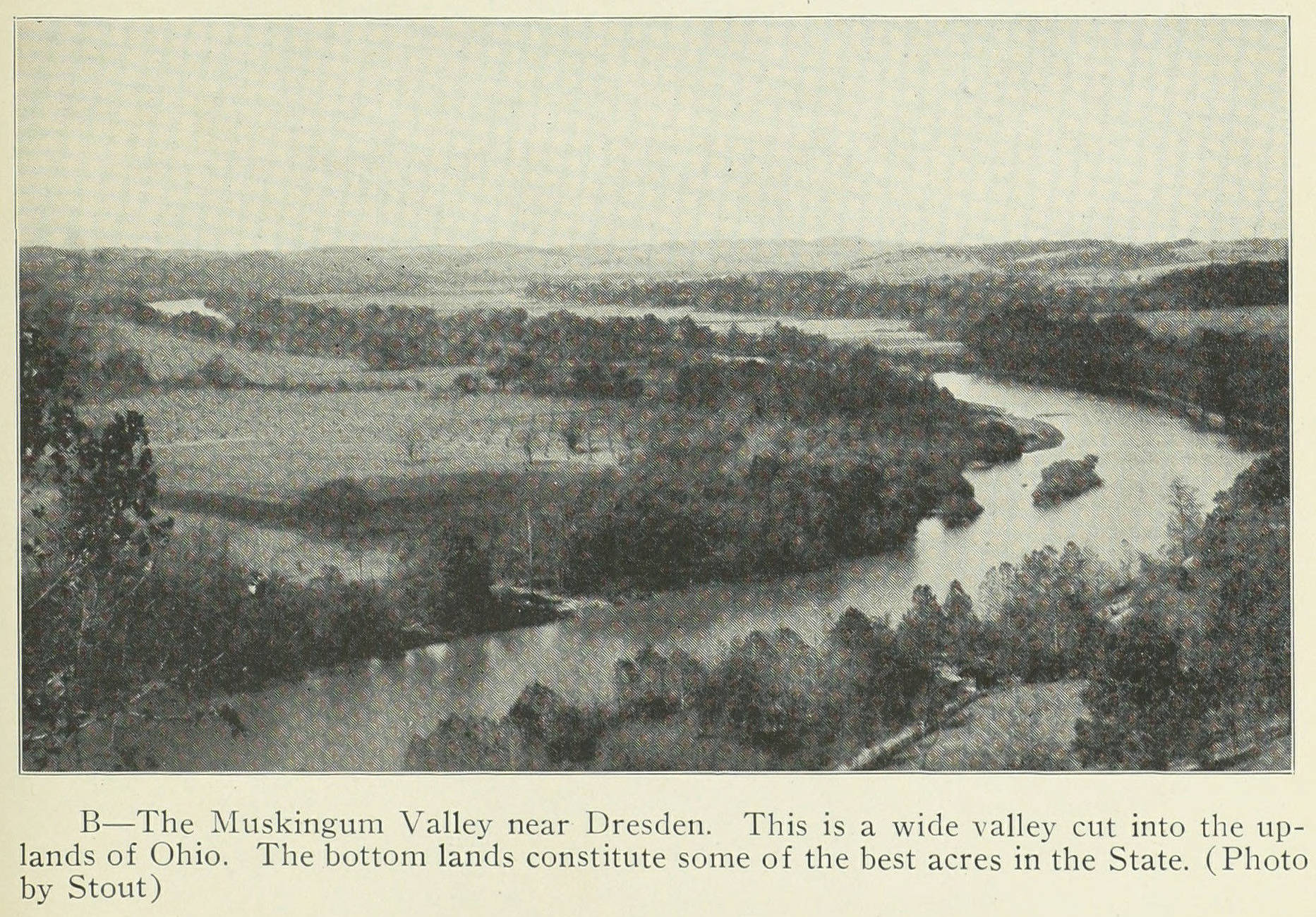
The Muskingum Valley near Dresden, seen in 1923 from the "Geography of Ohio"

According to the U.S. Census Bureau, the county has a total area of 673 square miles (1,740 km^{2}), of which 665 square miles (1,720 km^{2}) is land and 8.0 square miles (21 km^{2}) (1.2%) is water. It is the fourth-largest county in Ohio by land area.

=== Adjacent counties ===
- Coshocton County (north)
- Guernsey County (east)
- Noble County (southeast)
- Morgan County (south)
- Perry County (southwest)
- Licking County (west)

== Demographics ==
Historical population
Census	Pop.	Note	%±
1810	10,036		—
1820	17,824		77.6%
1830	29,334		64.6%
1840	38,749		32.1%
1850	45,049		16.3%
1860	44,416		−1.4%
1870	44,886		1.1%
1880	49,774		10.9%
1890	51,210		2.9%
1900	53,185		3.9%
1910	57,488		8.1%
1920	57,980		0.9%
1930	67,398		16.2%
1940	69,795		3.6%
1950	74,535		6.8%
1960	79,159		6.2%
1970	77,826		−1.7%
1980	83,340		7.1%
1990	82,068		−1.5%
2000	84,585		3.1%
2010	86,074		1.8%
2020	86,410		0.4%
2025 (est.)	87,014	▲	0.7%
U.S. Decennial Census; 1790-1960 1900-1990; 1990-2000 2020

=== 2020 census ===
As of the 2020 census, the county had a population of 86,410. The median age was 41.0 years. 22.5% of residents were under the age of 18 and 18.9% of residents were 65 years of age or older. For every 100 females there were 94.7 males, and for every 100 females age 18 and over there were 92.6 males age 18 and over.

The racial makeup of the county was 89.5% White, 3.5% Black or African American, 0.2% American Indian and Alaska Native, 0.5% Asian, <0.1% Native Hawaiian and Pacific Islander, 0.7% from some other race, and 5.7% from two or more races. Hispanic or Latino residents of any race comprised 1.2% of the population.

49.0% of residents lived in urban areas, while 51.0% lived in rural areas.

There were 35,091 households in the county, of which 28.6% had children under the age of 18 living in them. Of all households, 45.8% were married-couple households, 17.9% were households with a male householder and no spouse or partner present, and 27.4% were households with a female householder and no spouse or partner present. About 29.3% of all households were made up of individuals and 13.9% had someone living alone who was 65 years of age or older.

There were 38,358 housing units, of which 8.5% were vacant. Among occupied housing units, 67.4% were owner-occupied and 32.6% were renter-occupied. The homeowner vacancy rate was 1.5% and the rental vacancy rate was 7.4%.

=== Racial and ethnic composition ===
Muskingum County, Ohio – Racial and ethnic composition Note: the US Census treats Hispanic/Latino as an ethnic category. This table excludes Latinos from the racial categories and assigns them to a separate category. Hispanics/Latinos may be of any race.
Race / Ethnicity (NH = Non-Hispanic)	Pop 1980	Pop 1990	Pop 2000	Pop 2010	Pop 2020	% 1980	% 1990	% 2000	% 2010	% 2020
White alone (NH)	79,207	77,953	79,122	79,600	76,947	95.04%	94.99%	93.54%	92.48%	89.05%
Black or African American alone (NH)	3,490	3,440	3,364	3,214	2,985	4.19%	4.19%	3.98%	3.73%	3.45%
Native American or Alaska Native alone (NH)	115	208	171	169	138	0.14%	0.25%	0.20%	0.20%	0.16%
Asian alone (NH)	137	147	230	285	384	0.16%	0.18%	0.27%	0.33%	0.44%
Native Hawaiian or Pacific Islander alone (NH)	x	x	17	14	8	x	x	0.02%	0.02%	0.01%
Other race alone (NH)	92	73	127	131	378	0.11%	0.09%	0.15%	0.15%	0.44%
Mixed race or Multiracial (NH)	x	x	1,118	2,011	4,515	x	x	1.32%	2.34%	5.23%
Hispanic or Latino (any race)	299	247	436	650	1,055	0.36%	0.30%	0.52%	0.76%	1.22%
Total	83,340	82,068	84,585	86,074	86,410	100.00%	100.00%	100.00%	100.00%	100.00%

=== 2010 census ===
As of the 2010 United States census, there were 86,074 people, 34,271 households, and 23,125 families living in the county. The population density was 129.5 inhabitants per square mile (50.0/km^{2}). There were 38,074 housing units at an average density of 57.3 units per square mile (22.1 units/km^{2}). The racial makeup of the county was 93.0% white, 3.8% black or African American, 0.3% Asian, 0.2% American Indian, 0.2% from other races, and 2.5% from two or more races. Those of Hispanic or Latino origin made up 0.8% of the population. In terms of ancestry, 25.2% were German, 15.5% were Irish, 11.1% were American, and 10.9% were English.

Of the 34,271 households, 32.3% had children under the age of 18 living with them, 49.1% were married couples living together, 13.2% had a female householder with no husband present, 32.5% were non-families, and 26.9% of all households were made up of individuals. The average household size was 2.46 and the average family size was 2.95. The median age was 39.5 years.

The median income for a household in the county was $39,538 and the median income for a family was $48,425. Males had a median income of $40,183 versus $28,668 for females. The per capita income for the county was $20,561. About 13.0% of families and 16.6% of the population were below the poverty line, including 24.6% of those under age 18 and 9.3% of those age 65 or over.

=== 2000 census ===
As of the census of 2000, there were 84,585 people, 32,518 households, and 22,860 families living in the county. The population density was 127 inhabitants per square mile (49/km^{2}). There were 35,163 housing units at an average density of 53 units per square mile (20/km^{2}). The racial makeup of the county was 93.91% White, 4.01% Black or African American, 0.21% Native American, 0.27% Asian, 0.02% Pacific Islander, 0.20% from other races, and 1.37% from two or more races. 0.52% of the population were Hispanic or Latino of any race.

There were 32,518 households, out of which 33.30% had children under the age of 18 living with them, 54.30% were married couples living together, 12.00% had a female householder with no husband present, and 29.70% were non-families. 24.90% of all households were made up of individuals, and 10.90% had someone living alone who was 65 years of age or older. The average household size was 2.53 and the average family size was 3.01.

In the county, the population was spread out, with 25.90% under the age of 18, 9.40% from 18 to 24, 27.70% from 25 to 44, 22.60% from 45 to 64, and 14.30% who were 65 years of age or older. The median age was 36 years. For every 100 females, there were 92.00 males. For every 100 females age 18 and over, there were 88.40 males.

The median income for a household in the county was $35,185, and the median income for a family was $41,938. Males had a median income of $31,537 versus $22,151 for females. The per capita income for the county was $17,533. About 9.90% of families and 12.90% of the population were below the poverty line, including 17.90% of those under age 18 and 10.00% of those age 65 or over.

== Education ==
The county is served by 7 high schools: John Glenn High School in New Concord (East Muskingum Local School District), Philo High School confusingly not located in Philo but instead across the river in Duncan Falls (Franklin Local School District), Maysville High School located in South Zanesville (Maysville Local Schools), Bishop Rosecrans (Catholic high school in downtown Zanesville), Tri-Valley High School located in Dresden (Tri-Valley Local School District), West Muskingum High School located in Zanesville (West Muskingum Local School District), and Zanesville High School which, as the name implies, is in Zanesville (Zanesville City School District).

Each high school is the only high school in school districts of the same name, the exception being Roscrans as the district is referred to as Bishop Fenwick.

The county is also served by three colleges, Muskingum University, Zane State College, and a branch campus of Ohio University known as Ohio University Zanesville.

== Politics ==
Muskingum County is a Republican stronghold county in presidential elections. The 1964 election is the most recent in which the county voted Democratic, but Bill Clinton came within 48 votes of carrying it in 1996.

United States presidential election results for Muskingum County, Ohio
Year	Republican		Democratic		Third party(ies)	
Year	No.	%	No.	%	No.	%
1856	3,172	41.44%	3,391	44.30%	1,092	14.27%
1860	4,004	49.39%	3,550	43.79%	553	6.82%
1864	4,422	53.16%	3,896	46.84%	0	0.00%
1868	4,677	50.78%	4,534	49.22%	0	0.00%
1872	4,558	51.28%	4,304	48.42%	27	0.30%
1876	5,232	48.66%	5,457	50.75%	63	0.59%
1880	5,804	51.63%	5,336	47.46%	102	0.91%
1884	5,896	50.25%	5,696	48.54%	142	1.21%
1888	6,234	49.97%	5,884	47.17%	357	2.86%
1892	6,123	47.78%	6,230	48.62%	461	3.60%
1896	7,245	50.67%	6,871	48.05%	183	1.28%
1900	7,365	51.10%	6,667	46.25%	382	2.65%
1904	7,597	54.54%	5,511	39.57%	820	5.89%
1908	8,080	52.36%	6,576	42.62%	775	5.02%
1912	4,134	29.59%	5,376	38.47%	4,463	31.94%
1916	7,597	51.32%	6,328	42.75%	877	5.92%
1920	13,862	58.56%	9,437	39.87%	372	1.57%
1924	15,571	65.71%	6,709	28.31%	1,417	5.98%
1928	22,120	76.81%	6,507	22.60%	171	0.59%
1932	16,366	54.04%	13,378	44.17%	541	1.79%
1936	15,454	47.44%	16,265	49.93%	854	2.62%
1940	19,395	55.18%	15,753	44.82%	0	0.00%
1944	17,577	58.00%	12,729	42.00%	0	0.00%
1948	16,049	55.54%	12,765	44.18%	81	0.28%
1952	21,244	62.98%	12,490	37.02%	0	0.00%
1956	22,788	69.27%	10,110	30.73%	0	0.00%
1960	21,518	61.88%	13,254	38.12%	0	0.00%
1964	11,635	35.88%	20,792	64.12%	0	0.00%
1968	15,260	48.13%	13,089	41.28%	3,356	10.59%
1972	19,897	63.99%	10,313	33.17%	884	2.84%
1976	15,358	51.07%	14,178	47.15%	534	1.78%
1980	17,921	54.82%	12,584	38.50%	2,183	6.68%
1984	21,821	67.98%	10,037	31.27%	243	0.76%
1988	19,736	62.31%	11,691	36.91%	247	0.78%
1992	14,168	40.81%	11,670	33.61%	8,882	25.58%
1996	13,861	42.04%	13,813	41.89%	5,298	16.07%
2000	17,995	55.16%	13,415	41.12%	1,214	3.72%
2004	22,254	57.26%	16,421	42.25%	191	0.49%
2008	20,549	52.39%	17,730	45.20%	946	2.41%
2012	19,264	51.81%	17,002	45.73%	913	2.46%
2016	24,056	64.59%	11,123	29.86%	2,066	5.55%
2020	27,867	68.86%	11,971	29.58%	629	1.55%
2024	28,147	71.45%	10,874	27.60%	373	0.95%

United States Senate election results for Muskingum County, Ohio1
Year	Republican		Democratic		Third party(ies)	
Year	No.	%	No.	%	No.	%
2024	25,408	65.25%	11,852	30.44%	1,680	4.31%

== Culture ==
The Ohio Anti-Slavery Society was originally created as an auxiliary of the American Anti-Slavery Society and held its first meeting Putnam, Ohio, in April 1835. In 1872, Zanesville annexed the town of Putnam. It is now the Putnam Historic District of Zanesville.

The Muskingum County Library System serves the communities of Muskingum County from its administrative offices in Zanesville, Ohio. This includes service to Dresden, Duncan Falls, New Concord, and Roseville. In 2005, the library loaned more than 918,000 items to its 73,000 cardholders. Total holding are over 328,000 volumes with over 190 periodical subscriptions.

The Wilds is a 9,154 acres (37.04 km^{2}) wildlife preserve open to visitation for a fee.

This is a historic map of Muskingum County from 1852 including all owned property and acreage.

== Communities ==
=== City ===
- Zanesville (county seat)

=== Villages ===
- Adamsville
- Dresden
- Frazeysburg
- Fultonham
- Gratiot
- New Concord
- Norwich
- Philo
- Roseville
- South Zanesville

=== Townships ===
- Adams
- Blue Rock
- Brush Creek
- Cass
- Clay
- Falls
- Harrison
- Highland
- Hopewell
- Jackson
- Jefferson
- Licking
- Madison
- Meigs
- Monroe
- Muskingum
- Newton
- Perry
- Rich Hill
- Salem
- Salt Creek
- Springfield
- Union
- Washington
- Wayne

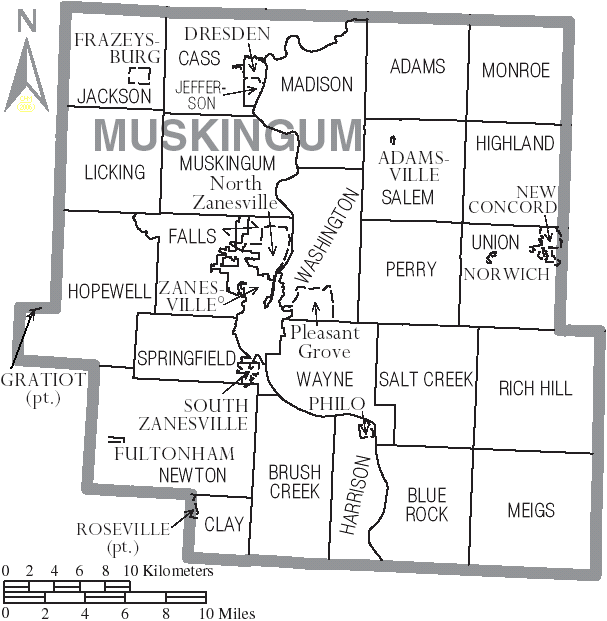
Map of Muskingum County, Ohio with municipal and township labels

=== Census-designated places ===
- Duncan Falls
- East Fultonham
- Nashport
- North Zanesville
- Pleasant Grove
- Trinway

=== Other unincorporated communities ===
- Adams Mills
- Bloomfield
- Blue Rock
- Bridgeville
- Chandlersville
- Coal Hill
- Darlington
- Dillon Falls
- Duncan Falls
- Ellis
- Freeland
- Gaysport
- Gilbert
- High Hill
- Hopewell
- Irville
- Licking View
- Mattingly Settlement
- Meadow Farm
- Mount Sterling
- Museville
- Otsego
- Rix Mills
- Ruraldale
- Sonora
- Stovertown
- Sundale
- White Cottage
- Young Hickory
- Zeno

=== Historical places ===
- Irville - Former populated place in Licking Township, removed for the creation of Dillon Lake.
- Mattingly Settlement - Named for the many members of the Mattingly family who settled in Muskingum Township.

== See also ==
- National Register of Historic Places listings in Muskingum County, Ohio
