= Bridgeville, Kentucky =

Unincorporated community in Kentucky, United States

Bridgeville
- Unincorporated community
- Location within the state of Kentucky Bridgeville (the United States)
- Coordinates: 38°35′42″N 84°1′12″W
- Country: United States
- State: Kentucky
- County: Bracken
- Elevation: 650 ft (200 m)
- Time zone: UTC-5 (Eastern (EST))
  - Summer (DST): UTC-4 (EST)
- GNIS feature ID: 507581

Bridgeville is an unincorporated community located in Bracken County, Kentucky, United States. Their post office is no longer in service.
