= Museville, Virginia =

Unincorporated community in Virginia, US

Coordinates: 36°54′45″N 79°35′29″W

Museville is an unincorporated community in Pittsylvania County, in the U.S. state of Virginia.
