= Maysville High School =

Location
- 3725 Panther Drive; Zanesville, Ohio 43701; 39°52′44″N 82°03′03″W

Information
- Type: Public
- School district: Maysville Local School District
- Staff: 24.50 (FTE)
- Grades: 9–12
- Student to teacher ratio: 19.02
- Colors: Blue and gold
- Athletics conference: Muskingum Valley League
- Mascot: Panthers
- Website: Maysville Local Schools

Maysville High School is a public high school in the Maysville Local School District which is located in the southern portion of Muskingum County, Ohio, just south of the city of Zanesville. The main campus, comprising 95 acres (380,000 m^{2}), houses approximately 2,300 students in the elementary, middle and high school.

In 2002, Maysville High School and Maysville Middle School moved to a nearly 90-acre (360,000 m^{2}) campus located on Panther Drive just off of U.S. Route 22 (Maysville Pike) in Newton Township. The High School and Middle School are combined into a single building called the Maysville 6–12 building. Previously, Maysville High School was located on Pinkerton Road in Springfield Township, with Maysville Middle School (formerly Maysville Junior High School) in a neighboring separate building.

== Academics ==
Elementary programs encompass all ability levels from gifted to those requiring additional intervention assistance. A variety of after school enrichment programs are also available to all elementary students throughout the year. In addition to academic excellence in the classroom the middle school programs strive to develop positive student character traits that aim to develop productive community members. Advanced Placement programs are implemented in the areas of Social Studies, Language Arts, Mathematics and the Sciences.

The arts are a large part of the academic curriculum, from kindergarten through high school, and allow students to learn how the arts affect their everyday life. Programs are offered in music, business, family consumer science, foreign language, traditional and technology arts which are involved with the community, shows, contests and integrated into other content areas.

The intervention programs at the elementary, middle and high schools are designed to serve students who are at risk of not reaching or maintaining academic success. The programs provide additional instructional resources, both during and after the school day, to help students obtain the necessary skills to achieve grade level expectations.

Alternative educational settings are available at Maysville for students needing academic options. These include Post Secondary Options which are pursued by students who qualify to take college classes during the school day, Career Based Intervention (CBI) in which students attend regular classes during the morning and then are dismissed into a work release program in the afternoon, and Virtual Learning Academy (VLA) which is an off campus educational entity. All work is performed on the computer in core areas as well as elective classes. Upon completion students are able to receive a diploma from Maysville High School.

== Clubs ==
Students at Maysville schools are active in a variety of clubs and extracurricular programs. Clubs range from curricular clubs such as A cappella, “Varsity M”, Spanish, French, and Drama to service-oriented organizations such as: Key Club, Leo Club and Student Government. To allow students to express their competitive sides Ski Club, and Quiz Team are offered, and Future Teachers, National Honor Society, SADD and U-Turn develop future skills.

Maysville Schools offer a variety of athletic opportunities for students of every ability level. Opportunities range from club and biddy league teams for Elementary age children to organized interleague teams for Middle School students, as well as Varsity, Interleague and Club Teams at the High School Level.

Since 1990 Maysville Local Schools have provided a latch-key program before and after school for students Pre-school through 6th grade. The program is also provided in the summer, snow days and professional in-service days. Besides supervision; field trips, homework help, crafts and snacks, and activities are provided.

The school is also involves the community in various outreach programs such as Middle School service projects, Senior Service Learning, and Computer Generated Imaging Senior Multi Media Class services. Monthly community forums are hosted by the superintendent to inform and receive feedback from members of the community regarding school issues. The “Community Bulletin Board” has also become a popular method of communication with the community. The community is also involved with the school through organizations such as band boosters, athletic boosters and 21st century grant programming.

== Sports ==
- Maysville High School is part of the Muskingum Valley League
- Maysville High School has a band, the Maysville High School Marching Band.
- Maysville High School is also home to three National Archery in the Schools Program (NASP) archery teams. The Maysville High School and Middle School Archery teams won the title of state champion two years in a row in 2007 and 2008. The Maysville Elementary Archery team also brought home a state championship title in 2008. The high school archery team has also been National Runner-Up at the NASP National Tournament in 2007 and 2008.

=== Ohio High School Athletic Association State Championships ===
- Boys Basketball – 2025
- Girls Softball – 1985
