= Falls Township, Muskingum County, Ohio =

Township in Ohio, US

- Township
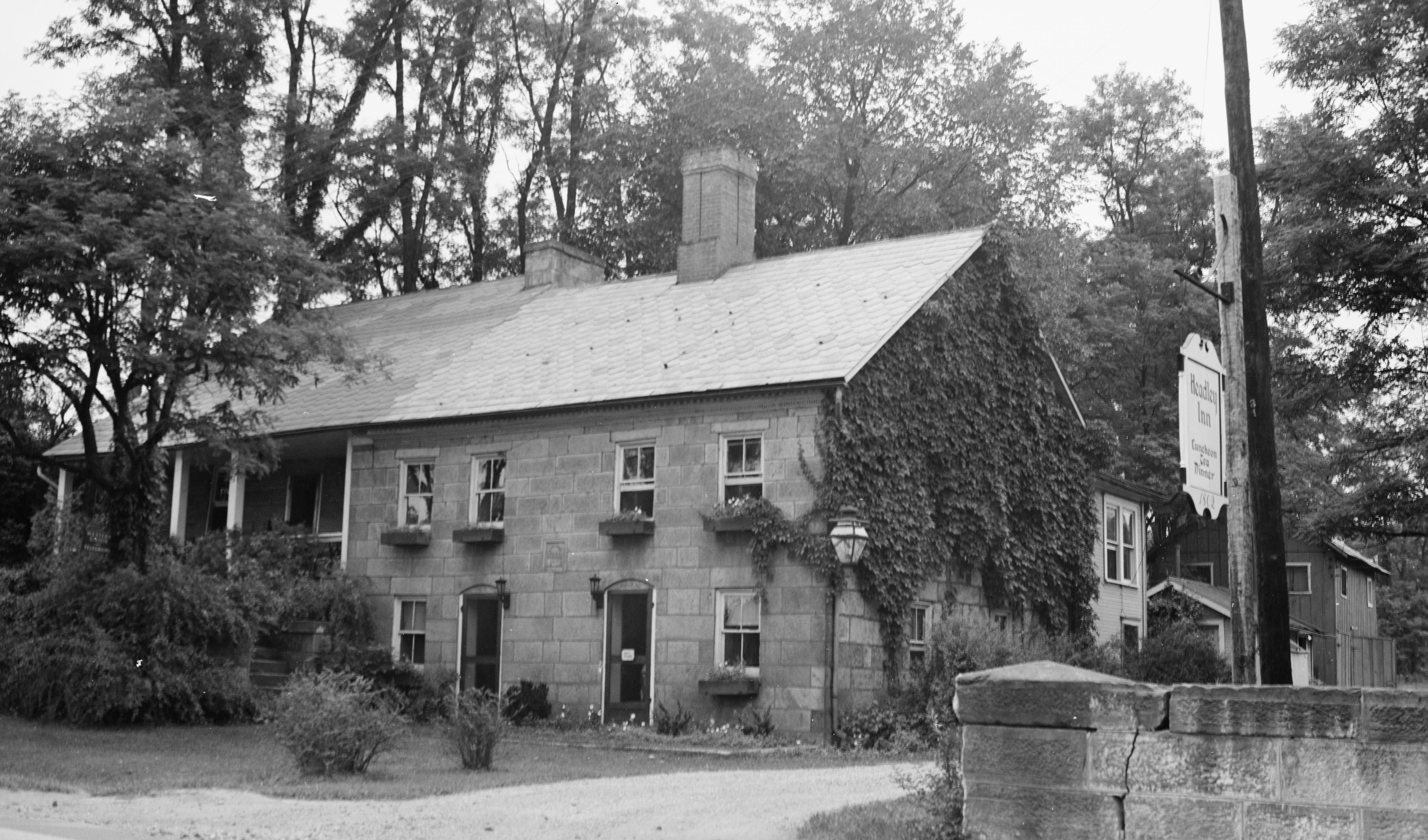
- Usual Headley Inn, built 1830

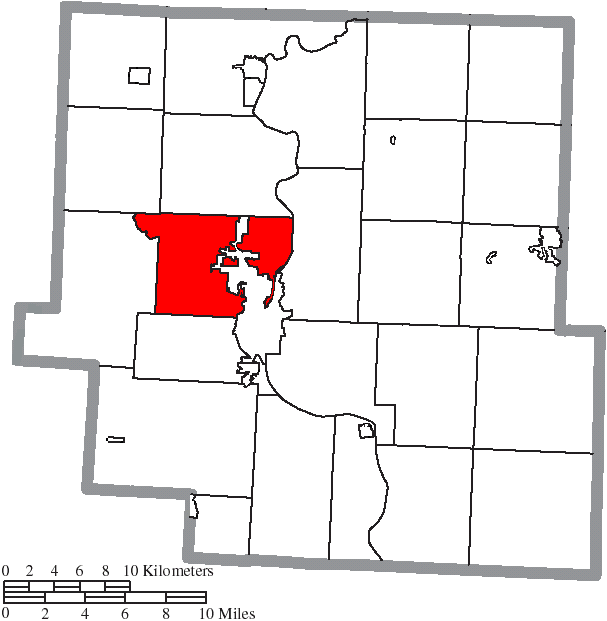
- Location of Falls Township in Muskingum County
- Coordinates: 39°58′59″N 82°2′5″W
- Country: United States
- State: Ohio
- County: Muskingum
- Township: Falls

Area
  - Total: 26.2 sq mi (67.8 km^{2})
  - Land: 24.9 sq mi (64.6 km^{2})
  - Water: 1.3 sq mi (3.3 km^{2})
- Elevation: 732 ft (223 m)

Population (2020)
  - Total: 8,718
  - Density: 350/sq mi (135/km^{2})
- Time zone: UTC-5 (Eastern (EST))
  - Summer (DST): UTC-4 (EDT)
- FIPS code: 39-26502
- GNIS feature ID: 1086718
- Website: https://www.fallstownship.org/

Falls Township is one of the twenty-five townships of Muskingum County, Ohio, United States. According to the 2020 census, the township had a population of 8,718 residents.

== Geography ==
Located in the western part of the county, it borders the following townships:

- Muskingum Township - north
- Washington Township - east
- Wayne Township - southeast corner
- Springfield Township - south
- Hopewell Township - west
- Licking Township - northwest

Much of the city of Zanesville, the county seat of Muskingum County, occupies eastern Falls Township, and the census-designated place of North Zanesville is located northeast of the city of Zanesville.

== Name and history ==
Falls Township was organized in 1808. Statewide, the only other Falls Township is located in Hocking County.

By the 1830s, Falls Township had a church, a blast furnace, as well as several mills and factories.

== Government ==
The township is governed by a three-member board of trustees, who are elected in November of odd-numbered years to a four-year term beginning on the following January 1. Two are elected in the year after the presidential election and one is elected in the year before it. There is also an elected township fiscal officer, who serves a four-year term beginning on April 1 of the year after the election, which is held in November of the year before the presidential election. Vacancies in the fiscal officership or on the board of trustees are filled by the remaining trustees.
