= Meigs Township, Muskingum County, Ohio =

Township in Ohio, US

- Township
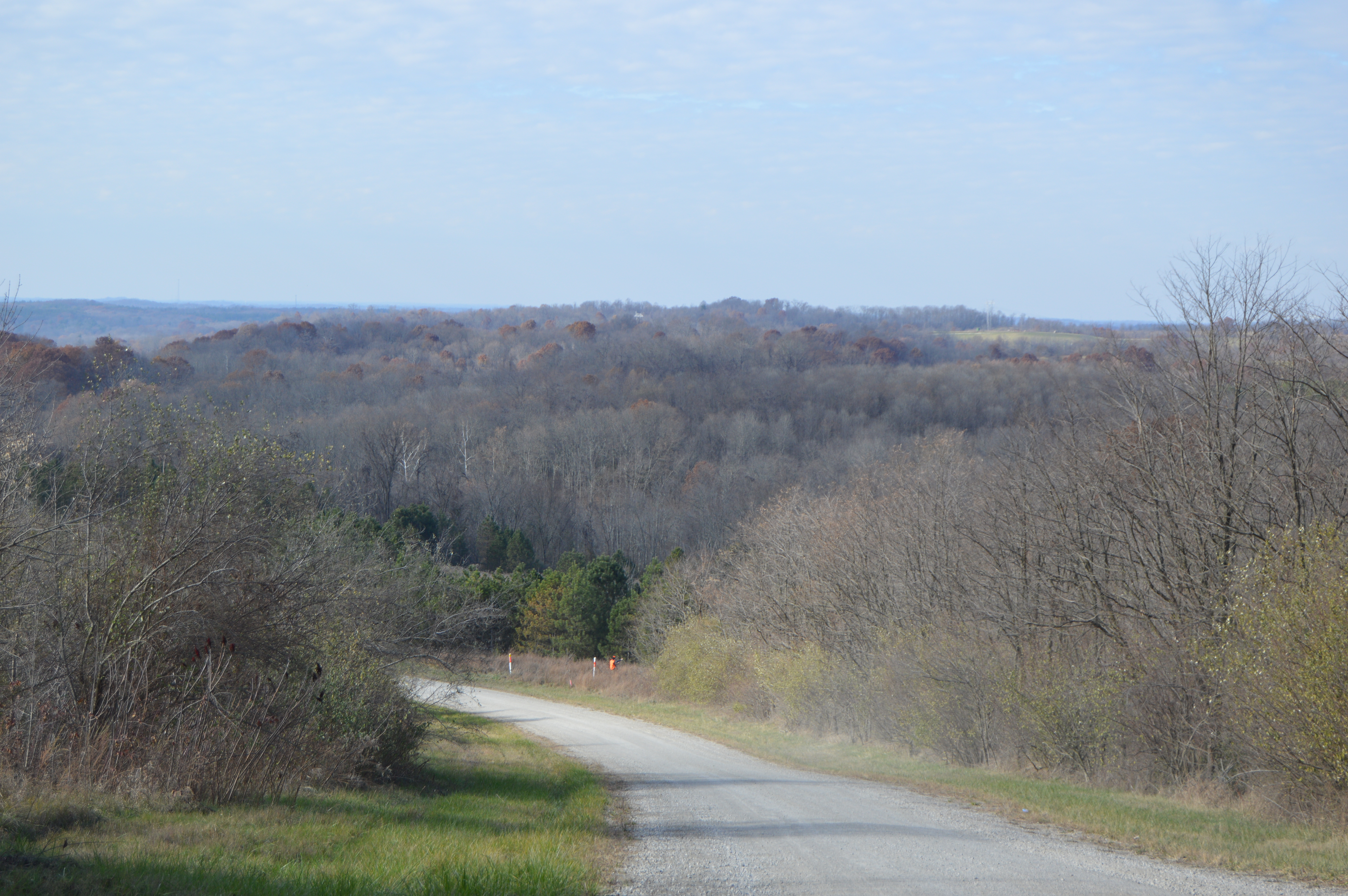
- Wooded landscape west of High Hill

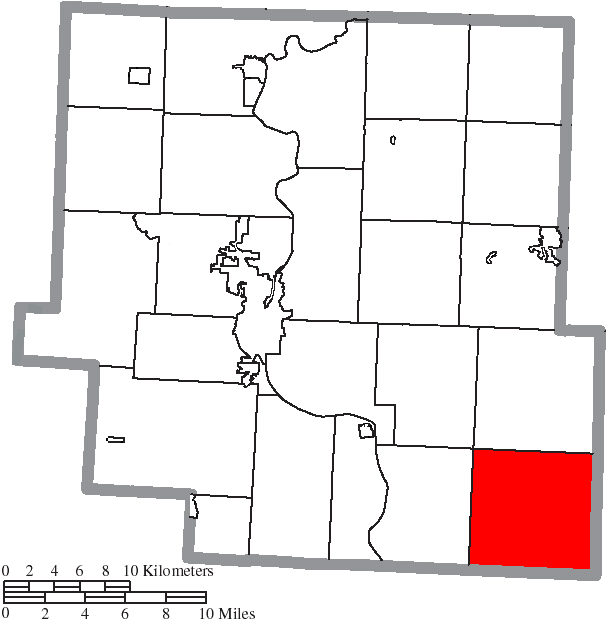
- Location of Meigs Township in Muskingum County
- Coordinates: 39°47′34″N 81°45′51″W
- Country: United States
- State: Ohio
- County: Muskingum

Area
  - Total: 37.5 sq mi (97.1 km^{2})
  - Land: 36.8 sq mi (95.4 km^{2})
  - Water: 0.66 sq mi (1.7 km^{2})
- Elevation: 1,165 ft (355 m)

Population (2020)
  - Total: 228
  - Density: 6.19/sq mi (2.39/km^{2})
- Time zone: UTC-5 (Eastern (EST))
  - Summer (DST): UTC-4 (EDT)
- FIPS code: 39-48916
- GNIS feature ID: 1086726

Meigs Township is one of the twenty-five townships of Muskingum County, Ohio, United States. The 2020 census found 228 people in the township.

== Geography ==
Located in the southeastern corner of the county, it borders the following townships:

- Rich Hill Township - north
- Spencer Township, Guernsey County - northeast corner
- Brookfield Township, Noble County - east
- Bristol Township, Morgan County - south
- Bloom Township, Morgan County - southwest corner
- Blue Rock Township - west
- Salt Creek Township - northwest corner

No municipalities are located in Meigs Township.

== Name and history ==
Meigs Township was named after Meigs Creek. Statewide, the only other Meigs Township is located in Adams County.

By the 1830s, Meigs Township had three gristmills and four saw mills.

== Government ==
The township is governed by a three-member board of trustees, who are elected in November of odd-numbered years to a four-year term beginning on the following January 1. Two are elected in the year after the presidential election and one is elected in the year before it. There is also an elected township fiscal officer, who serves a four-year term beginning on April 1 of the year after the election, which is held in November of the year before the presidential election. Vacancies in the fiscal officership or on the board of trustees are filled by the remaining trustees.

== Demographics ==
Historical population
Census	Pop.	Note	%±
1820	284		—
1850	1,495		—
1860	1,547		3.5%
1870	1,414		−8.6%
1880	1,528		8.1%
1890	1,446		−5.4%
1900	1,291		−10.7%
1910	1,035		−19.8%
1920	888		−14.2%
1930	714		−19.6%
1940	707		−1.0%
1950	540		−23.6%
1960	453		−16.1%
1970	281		−38.0%
1980	208		−26.0%
1990	165		−20.7%
2000	173		4.8%
2010	180		4.0%
2020	228		26.7%
