= Nashport, Ohio =

Unincorporated community in Ohio, U.S.

- Census-designated place
- Location within Ohio Location within the United States
- Coordinates: 40°4′14″N 82°10′33″W
- Country: United States
- State: Ohio
- County: Muskingum
- Township: Licking

Area
  - Total: 2.51 sq mi (6.5 km^{2})
  - Land: 2.49 sq mi (6.4 km^{2})
  - Water: 0.02 sq mi (0.052 km^{2})
- Elevation: 824 ft (251 m)

Population (2020)
  - Total: 449
  - Density: 180.2/sq mi (69.6/km^{2})
- Time zone: UTC-5 (Eastern (EST))
  - Summer (DST): UTC-4 (EDT)
- ZIP Code: 43830
- FIPS code: 39-53606
- GNIS feature ID: 1049001

Nashport is an unincorporated community and census-designated place in Licking Township, Muskingum County, Ohio, United States. It has a post office with the ZIP code 43830. As of the 2020 census, it had a population of 449.

== History ==
Nashport was founded in 1827, named for Captain Thomas Nash. A post office called Nashport has been in operation since 1834.

Nashport is the home of Eschman Meadows. Built by Tami Longaberger, former CEO of The Longaberger Company, Eschman Meadows is ostensibly the largest home in the state of Ohio.

Nashport was first listed as a census-designated place prior to the 2020 census.

== Geography ==
Nashport is in northwestern Muskingum County, in the western part of Licking Township. It is bordered to the west by Licking County. Ohio State Route 146 passes through the south side of the community, leading southeast 13 miles (21 km) to Zanesville, the Muskingum county seat, and west to State Route 16 in Licking County. Newark is 13 miles (21 km) west of Nashport via State Routes 146 and 16. State Route 586 runs along the eastern edge of the Nashport CDP, leading north 2.5 miles (4.0 km) to SR 16 at Black Run.

According to the U.S. Census Bureau, the Nashport CDP has a total area of 2.51 square miles (6.50 km^{2}), of which 0.02 square miles (0.05 km^{2}), or 0.80%, are water. Nashport is bordered to the south by the Licking River and the inundation zone of Dillon Lake, an impoundment on the river. The Licking River is a southeast-flowing tributary of the Muskingum River, which it joins at Zanesville.
