= Museville, Ohio =

Unincorporated community in Ohio, U.S.

Coordinates: 39°47′19″N 81°47′53″W

Museville is an unincorporated community in Muskingum County, in the U.S. state of Ohio.

== History ==
A post office called Museville was established in 1873, and remained in operation until 1902. Besides the post office, Museville had several shops and a country store.
