= High Hill, Ohio =

Unincorporated community in Ohio, U.S.

Coordinates: 39°49′55″N 81°45′55″W

High Hill is an unincorporated community in Muskingum County, in the U.S. state of Ohio.

== History ==
High Hill was named for the lofty elevation of the town site. A post office called High Hill was established in 1847, and remained in operation until 1901. Besides the post office, High Hill had an Odd Fellows hall and two country stores.
