= Gaysport, Ohio =

Unincorporated community in Ohio, U.S.

Coordinates: 39°48′10″N 81°53′26″W

Gaysport is an unincorporated community in Muskingum County, in the U.S. state of Ohio.

== History ==
Gaysport was laid out in 1880 by Asa Gay, and named for him. A post office called Gaysport was established in 1888, and remained in operation until 1926.
