= Licking Township, Muskingum County, Ohio =

Township in Ohio, US

- Township
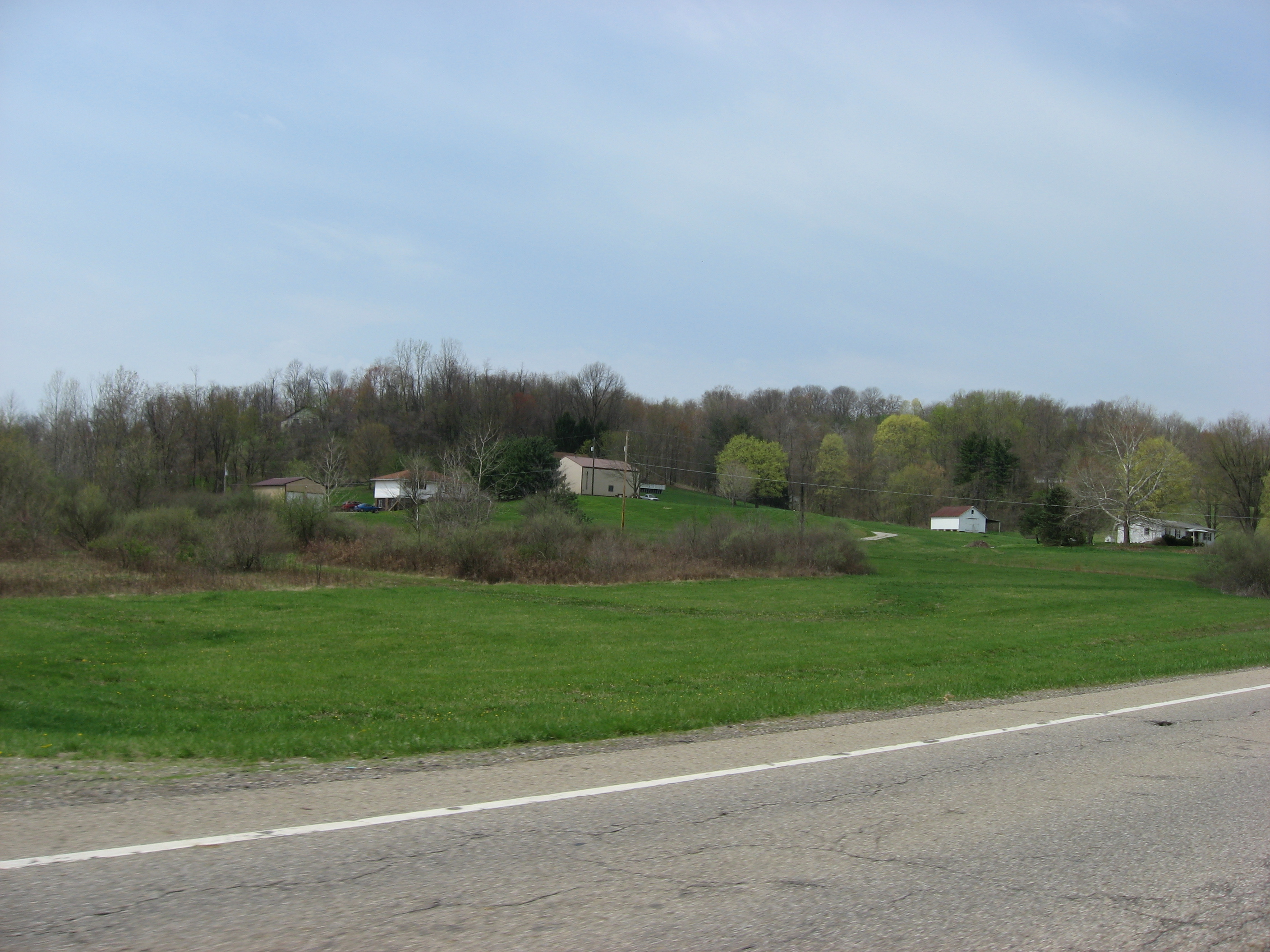
- Fields along State Route 146

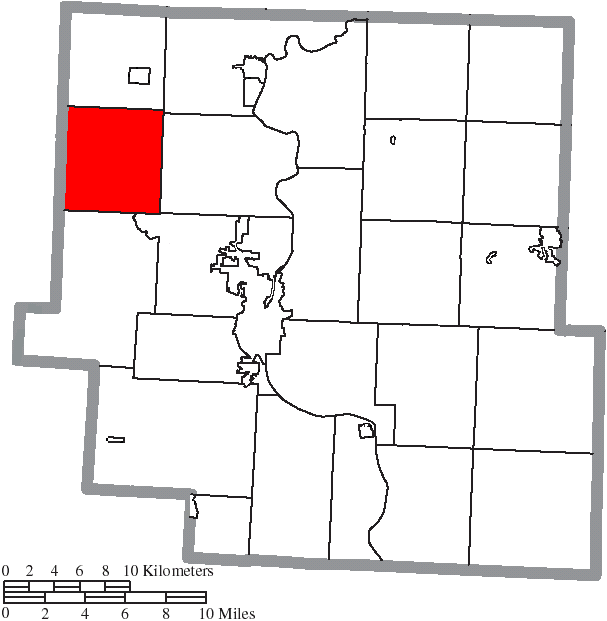
- Location of Licking Township in Muskingum County
- Coordinates: 40°3′23″N 82°8′27″W
- Country: United States
- State: Ohio
- County: Muskingum

Area
  - Total: 25.8 sq mi (66.7 km^{2})
  - Land: 25.1 sq mi (64.9 km^{2})
  - Water: 0.69 sq mi (1.8 km^{2})
- Elevation: 761 ft (232 m)

Population (2020)
  - Total: 2,352
  - Density: 93.9/sq mi (36.2/km^{2})
- Time zone: UTC-5 (Eastern (EST))
  - Summer (DST): UTC-4 (EDT)
- FIPS code: 39-43470
- GNIS feature ID: 1086724

Licking Township is one of the twenty-five townships of Muskingum County, Ohio, United States. The 2020 census found 2,352 people in the township.

== Geography ==
Located on the western edge of the county, it borders the following townships:

- Jackson Township - north
- Cass Township - northeast
- Muskingum Township - east
- Falls Township - southeast
- Hopewell Township - south
- Hopewell Township, Licking County - southwest corner
- Hanover Township, Licking County - west
- Perry Township, Licking County - northwest corner

No municipalities are located in Licking Township, although the census-designated place of Nashport lies in the western part of the township.

== Name and history ==
Statewide, the only other Licking Township is located in Licking County.

Licking Township was organized before 1806. By the 1830s, Licking Township contained two churches, four mills, and two of the largest ancient mounds in the county.

== Government ==
The township is governed by a three-member board of trustees, who are elected in November of odd-numbered years to a four-year term beginning on the following January 1. Two are elected in the year after the presidential election and one is elected in the year before it. There is also an elected township fiscal officer, who serves a four-year term beginning on April 1 of the year after the election, which is held in November of the year before the presidential election. Vacancies in the fiscal officership or on the board of trustees are filled by the remaining trustees.
