= University of Wisconsin–Milwaukee Libraries Digital Collections =

The University of Wisconsin–Milwaukee Libraries Digital Collections was established in 2001 to provide online access to the library's unique resources. It serves both the University of Wisconsin–Milwaukee academic community and the general public.

== Preservation ==
In May 2010, the UWM Libraries Digital Collections began collaborating with the American Geographical Society Library on a preservation project funded by the National Endowment for the Humanities. The project, entitled Saving and Sharing the AGS Library's Historic Nitrate Negative Images, encompasses "the digitization and rehousing of 56,000 nitrate photographic negatives that document landscapes, streetscapes, and human cultures around the world."

== Collection development ==
Project proposals for new collections are submitted to the Digitization Unit and reviewed by the UWM Libraries Digitization Oversight Committee.

For approved projects, materials are carefully selected by collection curators and subject specialists from the libraries and departments housing the source collections. The UWM Libraries Digitization Unit digitizes these materials following established standards and best practices. The digitized resources are researched and described to enhance discoverability and usability. CONTENTdm software manages the online collections. Digital master files are stored in the UWM Libraries digital repository to ensure long-term accessibility. High-resolution digital images are available for order.

== Current collections ==
The UWM Libraries Digital Collections comprise over 50,000 digital objects, including photographic images, maps, and books sourced from the American Geographical Society Library, the Archives, Special Collections, and the Curriculum Library.

=== List of digital collections ===
==== Holdings of the American Geographical Society Library ====
- AGSL Digital Photo Archive – Asia and the Middle East.
- AGSL Digital Photo Archive – Africa.
- AGSL Digital Photo Archive – North and Central America
- AGSL Digital Photo Archive – South America
- AGSL Digital Map Collection
- Afghanistan: Images from the Harrison Forman Collection
- Cities Around the World
- Images of Russia and Caucasus Region 1929–1933
- Nazi Invasion of Poland in 1939
- Tibet – From the Collections of the AGS
- Transportation Around the World: 1911–1993
- Digital Sanborn Maps of Milwaukee 1894 and 1910

==== Holdings of the Archives ====
- The March on Milwaukee Civil Rights History Project
- Architectural Drawings of Willis and Lillian Leenhouts
- Greetings from Milwaukee
- Milwaukee Neighborhoods Photos and Maps 1885–1992
- The Milwaukee Repertory Theater Photographic History
- Picturing Golda Meir
- UWM Photos Collection
- UWM Yearbook Collection

==== Holdings of the Special Collections ====
- The Tse-Tsung Chow Collection of Chinese Scrolls and Fan Paintings / 周策縱書畫卷軸與扇面收藏集
- Aviation History: Selections from the George Hardie Collection
- UWM Book Arts Collection

==== Holdings of the Curriculum Library ====
- Selections from the Curriculum Library's Historical Collection

== Copyright and permissions ==
All UWM Libraries Digital Collections are published by the University of Wisconsin–Milwaukee Libraries. Copyright © 2010 Board of Regents of the University of Wisconsin System. All rights reserved.

=== Images appearing on Wikipedia ===
UWM Libraries Digital Collections images published on Wikipedia are under a Creative Commons Attribution-ShareAlike 3.0 Unported License.

=== Images appearing on the UWM Libraries website ===
The low-resolution images available from the UWM Libraries Digital Collections website may be copied by individuals or libraries for personal use, research, teaching or any "fair use" as defined by copyright law.

Use fees are charged in addition to reproduction fees when images are published or redistributed. Use fees are negotiated on an individual basis. Requests to publish, exhibit, or redistribute the images included in the UWM Libraries Digital Collections must be obtained in writing.

== See also ==
- University of Wisconsin–Milwaukee Libraries
