= University of Wisconsin–Milwaukee academics =

The University of Wisconsin–Milwaukee is a doctoral-degree granting public research university that consists of 14 colleges and schools, and 70 academic centers, institutes and laboratory facilities. It offers a total of 180 degree programs, including 94 bachelor's, 53 master's and 32 doctorate degrees. The School of Freshwater Sciences is the only graduate school of freshwater science in the U.S. and the third in the world. The School of Architecture and Urban Planning, the College of Nursing and the College of Health Sciences are the largest in Wisconsin.

The university is categorized as an R1 Research University (very high research activity) in the Carnegie Classification of Institutions of Higher Education. Per U.S. News & World Report 2012, the university is ranked 121st nationally by America's Best High School guidance counselors as offering the best undergraduate education to their students.

== Colleges and schools ==
- College of Engineering and Applied Science
- College of General Studies
- College of Health Sciences
- College of Letters and Science
- College of Nursing
- Graduate School
- Helen Bader School of Social Welfare
- Peck School of the Arts
- School of Architecture and Urban Planning
- School of Continuing Education
- School of Education
- School of Information Studies
- Joseph J. Zilber School of Public Health
- Sheldon B. Lubar School of Business
- School of Freshwater Sciences

== Rankings ==
Academic rankings

National
- U.S. News & World Report: 230-301
- Washington Monthly: 206

Global
- ARWU: 401-500
- THE: 401-500
- U.S. News & World Report: 448

Based on the statistical analysis by H.J. Newton, Professor of Statistics at Texas A&M University in 1997 on the National Research Council report issued in 1995, the University of Wisconsin–Milwaukee was ranked 72nd among public universities in the U.S. in the NRC Rankings. It was also ranked among the top 100 universities in the U.S. by Vanguard College Ranking, 247th by Washington Monthly and one of the best Midwest colleges by Princeton Review. The university ranked 189th in the US by research expenditure in 2007.

The university ranks 98th in the world in the Professional Ranking of World Universities conducted by the École des Mines de Paris in 2011 and ranked as one of the top 500 world universities in the Academic Ranking of World Universities compiled by Shanghai Jiao Tong University. The SCImago Institutions Rankings rated UW-Milwaukee 759th among 3,042 universities and research institutions worldwide in term of research output, international collaboration, normalized impact and publication rate in 2011. The Webometrics Ranking of World Universities ranked UW-Milwaukee 200th worldwide and 96th in North American.

== Programs ==
- College of Engineering and Applied Science consists of civil engineering, electrical engineering, industrial engineering, materials engineering, mechanical engineering, and computer science six departments, with 9 faculty members receiving National Science Foundation Career Awards, 3 Wisconsin Distinguished Professors and 3 UWM Distinguished Professors. The College of Engineering and Applied Science ranks 131st nationally by U.S. News & World Report, with its computer science program ranked 110th in 2012. Based on the statistical analysis by H.J. Newton, Professor of Statistics at Texas A&M University in 1997 on the National Research Council report issued in 1995, the school was ranked 73rd nationally in the National Research Council (NRC) rankings, with its Civil Engineering program 69th, Electronic Engineering 96th, Industrial Engineering 34th, Materials science 60th, and Mechanical Engineering 87th.
- College of General Studies offers associate degrees to students attending classes at UWM at Washington County, or UWM at Waukesha.
- College of Health Sciences is the largest college of health sciences in the Midwest and it offers the largest number of health-related degree programs in Wisconsin. The school's occupational therapy program was ranked 28th, physical therapy 63rd nationally by U.S. News & World Report in 2012.
- College of Letters and Science offers 40 bachelor's degrees, 20 masters and 12 doctoral degrees. Based on the statistical analysis by H.J. Newton, Professor of Statistics at Texas A&M University in 1997 on the National Research Council report issued in 1995, the National Research Council (NRC) rankings rank UW-Milwaukee's Anthropology program 62nd, Economics program 88th, English department 32nd, Geosciences program 92nd, Geography program 31st, Physics program 88th and Political Science program 51st. The political science department was ranked 81st globally in a study published by Political Study Review in 2004. In a study published by the Southern Economic Journal in 2008, the research productivity of the economics department was ranked in the top third of the 129 economics doctoral degree-granting institutions in the U.S. The hydrogeology program within the Department of Geosciences was ranked among the top 100 programs in North America by the National Ground Water Association.
- College of Nursing is the largest nursing school in Wisconsin, offering bachelor's, master's, and doctoral degrees. In addition to the main campus at UW-Milwaukee, the College of Nursing also has a Bachelor of Science in Nursing Program at UW-Parkside and UW-Washington County. The College of Nursing was ranked 36th nationally by U.S. News & World Report in 2012. It ranked 36th among Schools of Nursing in the US for National Institutes of Health (NIH) funding.
- Helen Bader School of Social Welfare ranked 52nd nationally by U.S. News & World Report in 2012. In March, 2010, the school was awarded the 2010 Academic Excellence Award from the American Public Human Services Association (APHSA)
- Joseph J. Zilber College of Public Health is a graduate school focusing on public health research and education. It is one of more than 40 accredited schools of public health in the United States and the first devoted specifically to public health in Wisconsin.
- Peck School of the Arts consists of dance, film, music, theatre, and visual art departments. The school also hosts the Institute of Visual Art (Inova), an internationally known exhibition venue for contemporary art. The school was ranked 62nd nationally by U.S. News & World Report in 2012. The school's film program is ranked world top 20 by The Hollywood Reporter.
- School of Architecture and Urban Planning offers bachelor's, master's and doctoral degrees in Architecture and Urban Planning, with an enrollment of more than 800. The school was ranked among the top twenty by U.S. News & World Report in a recent report. The journal DesignIntelligence in an annual edition of "America's Best Architecture & Design Schools" has also ranked the School of Architecture and Urban Planning among the top twenty and second in the Midwest, as well as tied for third in their ‘Most Innovative Programs’ category. The Key Center for Architectural Sociology ranked School of Architecture and Urban Planning 18th in research performance among more than 130 schools in North America.
- School of Education offers five undergraduate major, five master's, and 12 doctoral programs. It also offers the only four-year interpreter training degree in Wisconsin. The school was ranked 67th nationally by U.S. News & World Report in 2012.
- School of Information Studies offers B.S., MLIS and Doctoral programs of Information sciences The school ranked 16th nationally by U.S. News & World Report in 2009. Its Archives and Preservation program was nationally ranked the 9th by U.S. News & World Report in 2009. The school was recognized by UNESCO as one of the "leading international academic institutions" for its "ongoing role in promoting e-government and information ethics initiatives in Africa" in 2009.
- Sheldon B. Lubar School of Business offers bachelor, master and doctoral degrees in a variety of specialities. The school has a total of more than four thousand students enrollment. The Management Information Systems (MIS) program of Sheldon B. Lubar School of Business is ranked 19th in the U.S. and 24th in the world by a study published in Communications for the Association for Information Systems. Also, the Organizations and Strategic Management program is ranked 32nd worldwide by a joint study conducted by Texas A&M University and the University of Florida. In 2006 and 2008, the School was ranked among the top 100 business schools around the world in terms of research productivity.
- School of Freshwater Sciences (SFS) is the only graduate school of freshwater science in the U.S. and the third in the world. It offers Doctor of Philosophy (Ph.D.) and Master of Science (M.S.) of Freshwater Sciences in Freshwater System Dynamics, Human and Ecosystem Health, Freshwater Technology and Freshwater Economics, Policy and Management. Located at the edge of the Great Lakes, SFS was built upon the Great Lakes WATER Institute, a freshwater research institution of the University of Wisconsin System administered by the Graduate School of University of Wisconsin–Milwaukee.
