= San Buenaventura Power Plant =

Coal power plant in Quezon, Philippines

- Country: Philippines
- Location: Mauban, Quezon
- Coordinates: 14°13′39″N 121°45′17″E
- Construction began: 2015
- Commission date: 2019
- Owner: San Buenaventura Power Ltd. Co.
- Operator: San Buenaventura Power Ltd. Co.

Thermal power station
- Primary fuel: Coal

Power generation
- Nameplate capacity: 500 MW

External links
- Website: www.sbpl.com.ph/asset/

The San Buenaventura Power Plant is a coal power plant under construction in Mauban, Quezon, Philippines. It is the Philippines' first supercritical coal power plant.

== History ==
The groundbreaking ceremony for the San Buenaventura Power Plant was held in December 2015. Power plant owner and future operator, San Buenaventura Power Ltd. Co (SPBL) tapped Daelim industrial and Mitsubishi Corp. as the coal power plant project's engineering, procurement and construction contractor. The construction was hindered by the fact that there is an existing power facility ran by Quezon Power Philippines Ltd. at the site. By February 2019, the whole coal power plant project is already 97.38 percent complete.

In May 2019, testing and commissioning of the San Buenaventura plant began and was connected to the national grid within the same month.

== Background ==
The power plant is owned and operated by San Buenaventura Power Ltd. Co which is a established as a result of a joint venture between Meralco through its power-generating arm Meralco PowerGen Corp., and New Growth BV, a wholly owned subsidiary of Thai firm Electricity Generating Public Co. Ltd. The San Buenaventura Power Plant is meant to provide a baseload supply of electricity for the Luzon area. It is also the first supercritical coal power plant in the Philippines

The facility has a total capacity of 500 MW with 455 MW of the output to be sold to Meralco for distribution.
