= University of Wisconsin–Milwaukee College of Nursing =

UW–Milwaukee College of Nursing
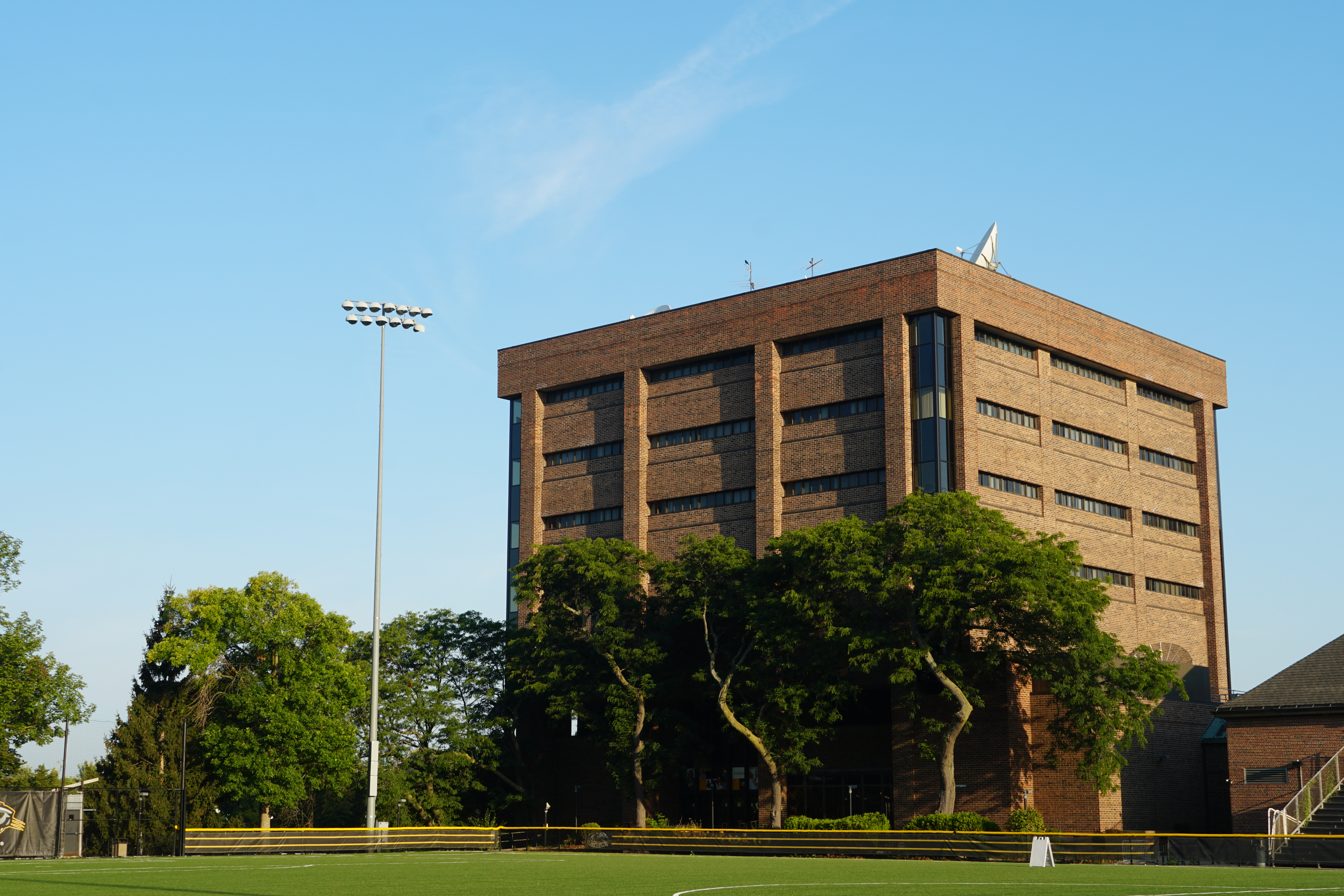
- Cunningham Hall
- Type: Public
- Dean: Kim Litwack
- Location: Milwaukee, Wisconsin, United States
- Campus: University of Wisconsin–Milwaukee
- Website: http://www4.uwm.edu/nursing
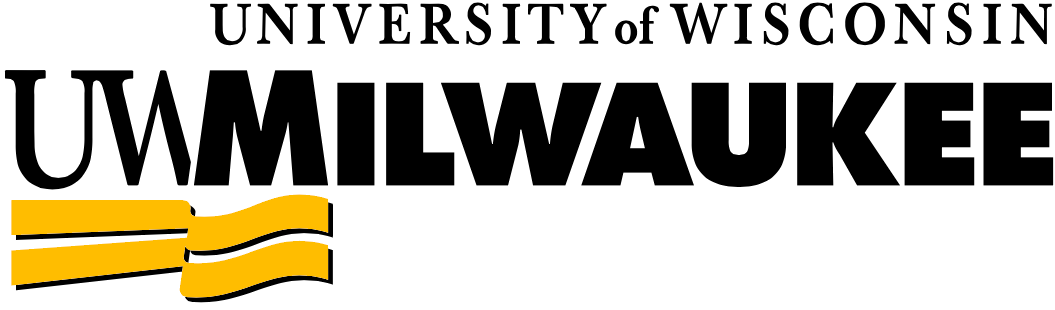

The School of Nursing is a college within the University of Wisconsin–Milwaukee. It is the largest nursing school in Wisconsin, offering bachelor's, master's, and doctoral degrees. In addition to the main campus at UW-Milwaukee, the School of Nursing also has a Bachelor of Science in Nursing Program at UW-Parkside and UW-Washington County.

The School of Nursing was ranked 32nd nationally by U.S. News & World Report in 2010. It ranked 36th among Schools of Nursing in the US for National Institutes of Health (NIH) funding.

== Research centers ==
- Center for Cultural Diversity and Global Health
- Center for Nursing History
- Harriet H. Werley Center for Nursing Research and Evaluation
- Nursing Learning Resource Center
- Self Management Science Center

== See also ==
- University of Wisconsin–Milwaukee College of Health Sciences
- University of Wisconsin–Milwaukee School of Public Health
