= George Greenamyer =

American sculptor (1939–2023)

- Born: George Mossman Greenamyer; July 13, 1939; Cleveland, Ohio, US
- Died: April 26, 2023 (aged 83)
- Occupation: Sculptor
- Spouse: Beverly Burbank

George Mossman Greenamyer (July 13, 1939 – April 26, 2023) was an American sculptor.

He received a BFA in 1963 from the Philadelphia College of Art and an MFA in 1969 from the University of Kansas. He was a professor at the Massachusetts College of Art for more than thirty years.

His 1983 work includes making use of two turbines from the Philo Power Plant and Twin Branch Power Plant as sculptures. The two turbines were mounted onto granite piers were placed in a plaza at the AEP Building in Columbus, Ohio.

Heritage Schooner for Debra Lakin, September 30, 1998 (1998)

From 1988 to 1991, Greenamyer staged an annual event at Laumeier Sculpture Park in St. Louis, Missouri called "Fire and Ice", in which he fashioned a massive ice sculpture that was then set ablaze over a bonfire. The event suffered several weather-related problems, however. In its first two years, unexpectedly cold weather kept the sculptures from melting properly for the crowd; in 1990 and 1991, unexpectedly warm weather caused the sculptures to melt before the actual event. Laumeier Sculpture Park later commissioned a piece from Greenamyer in memory of its Marketing Director, Debra Lakin: Heritage Schooner for Debra Lakin, September 30, 1998.

His sculpture Milwaukee was installed outside the University of Wisconsin–Milwaukee's Golda Meir Library in 1989. It depicts agricultural and urban scenes from Milwaukee's history.

In 1991, University of Oregon athletic director Bill Byrne ordered a worker to cut down and remove a newly installed Greenamyer sculpture with a blowtorch. Byrne stated that he had found it "not in character with the rest of the front of the building". Greenamyer himself came to the scene, threatening to chain himself to the $54,000 sculpture to prevent its destruction. After mediation by UO president Myles Brand, it was agreed that the damage already done to the sculpture would be repaired, and it would be reinstalled at another location on campus.

== Public Installations ==
- Mass Art Vehicle, 1970, DeCordova Sculpture Park and Museum (Lincoln, Massachusetts)
- Five Shaker Houses, 1979, Art Complex Museum (Duxbury, Massachusetts)
- East Cambridge—1852, 1988, Cambridge Arts Council (Cambridge, Massachusetts)
- Start To Finish, 1990, Iowa State University (Ames, Iowa)
- Heritage Schooner for Debra Lakin, September 30, 1998, 1998, Laumeier Sculpture Park (Saint Louis, Missouri)
