= Greenamyer =

Greenamyer is a surname. Notable people with the surname include:

- Darryl Greenamyer (1936–2018), American aviator
- George Greenamyer (born 1939), American sculptor
