= Bill Byrne (athletic director) =

American college athletics administrator

Biographical details
- Born: Boston, Massachusetts, U.S.

Administrative career (AD unless noted)
- 1984–1992: Oregon
- 1992–2002: Nebraska
- 2003–2012: Texas A&M

Clarence William Byrne Jr. is an American retired college athletics administrator. He was the athletic director at the University of Oregon from 1984 to 1992, at the University of Nebraska–Lincoln from 1992 to 2002, and at Texas A&M University from January 2003 to May 8, 2012, when he retired. He was a Special Adviser to Texas A&M University President R. Bowen Loftin until August 31, 2012. Upon leaving the athletic department, he held the title of athletic director emeritus at Texas A&M.

== Early life ==
Byrne grew up in Idaho. He attended Idaho State University, where he served as student body president and received a bachelor's degree in business in 1967. He went on to receive his MBA from Idaho State in 1971. From 1971 to 1976, he served as the director of alumni relations at Idaho State. He then moved to the University of New Mexico, where he would serve as the executive director of the New Mexico Lobo Club, the division within the athletic department responsible for raising athletic scholarships, from 1976 to 1979. From 1980 to 1982, he was the assistant athletic director at San Diego State University.

== Athletic director career ==
=== Oregon ===
Byrne started his head athletic directing career in 1984 at the University of Oregon. At Oregon, he led a $19 million fundraiser that helped to build new buildings for the football team and athletic offices. For his role in the fundraiser, he was named National Fundraiser of the Year by the National Athletic Fundraisers Association in 1985.

In 1991, Byrne ordered a worker to cut down and remove a newly installed George Greenamyer sculpture with a blowtorch. Byrne stated that he had found it "not in character with the rest of the front of the building". Greenamyer himself came to the scene, threatening to chain himself to the $54,000 sculpture to prevent its destruction. After mediation by UO president Myles Brand, it was agreed that the damage already done to the sculpture would be repaired, and it would be reinstalled on another location on campus.

=== Nebraska ===
Byrne served as the athletic director at University of Nebraska–Lincoln for 11 years, from 1992 to 2002. His teams won 8 national championships and 82 Big Eight Conference and Big 12 Conference championships. His athletic program compiled seven straight top 25 finishes in the standings of the NACDA Director's Cup. He resigned from Nebraska on December 2, 2002, to take over as athletic director at Texas A&M.

=== Texas A&M ===
During Byrne's tenure at A&M, the Aggies won 45 Big 12 Conference Championships in 11 different sports and captured nine team national championships in equestrian, six in outdoor track and field, one in women's basketball, and one in men's golf. The 40 championships won by the Aggies from January 2003 through the end of the 2011 season rank second in the league. The Aggies’ 33 conference championships won during the last five seasons combined are the second most of any school.

The 2010-11 athletic season was a record setting campaign as A&M captured four national championships, and nine Big 12 Championships. Both marks were school-bests.

In the Learfield Director's Cup all-sport rankings, Byrne guided A&M to its six highest finishes in school history, include back-to-back top eight finishes. The Aggies completed the 2009–10 season ranked 6th in the nation — its best finish ever. In 2010–11, the Aggies tallied their most points ever and finished 8th to lead the Big 12 Conference.

Byrne managed an annual athletic budget in excess of $75 million. During his tenure at A&M, he oversaw the construction or renovation of approximately $85 million in athletic facilities. Byrne teamed with the 12th Man Foundation, the institution's primary fundraising organization for athletics, to develop a comprehensive plan for A&M's athletic facilities. Together, they secured several major gifts for the second and third phases of A&M's Championship Vision Capital Campaign raising over $100 million.

The cornerstone of Phase Three of the campaign was the renovation and expansion of A&M's baseball stadium Olsen Field. The $26 million project was completed in February 2012 and made the 31-year-old facility a premier college baseball destination. Thanks to a $7 million lead gift by Ed and Howard Kruse of Blue Bell Creameries, the stadium is named Olsen Field at Blue Bell Park.

Citing the need for an indoor football facility and an indoor track and field stadium, Byrne ensured the multi-purpose $36 million McFerrin Athletic Center became a reality in 2007 and 2008 as part of Phase Two. The complex boasts a full sized football field, a state-of-the-art hydraulic track which has hosted national championships, and seating for 5,000 spectators.

At the same time, Byrne recognized the need for a basketball practice facility that would allow the basketball teams to each have their own practice courts, locker rooms, a weight room, an athletic training room, and offices under the same roof. In the fall of 2008, the $23 million Cox-McFerrin Center for Aggie Basketball opened its doors as part of an expansion to Reed Arena.

Byrne made an impact in marketing Aggie Athletics. In January 2006, A&M awarded the school's athletic multimedia marketing rights for 10 years to a joint venture of Learfield Communications, ISP Sports, and FSN Southwest – known collectively as Texas A&M Sports Properties. The agreement is one of the top multimedia rights contracts in the country and provides significant income for A&M athletics throughout the length of the agreement.

Byrne tabbed the guaranteed revenue from the Learfield agreement to finance the department's video screen and ribbon board expansion project which included Kyle Field, Reed Arena, and a portable video screen mounted on a 53-foot trailer. He also expanded the department's television production operation, 12th Man Productions.

Increased attendance at home contests has also been aided by the creation of a fan rewards program for frequent attendance. The 12th Man Team Rewards Program is a fan-loyalty program that allows A&M's Athletic Department to thank their most dedicated fans’ continued support and attendance at the school's home athletic events. Upon its inception in 2003, attendance records at A&M were immediately shattered. Each sport offered at A&M has set at least one new school attendance record.

While at A&M, Byrne hired 12 head coaches in nine sports. Each hire achieved postseason competition within their first two seasons. In the fall of 2010, 249 student-athletes were named to the Big 12 Commissioners Honor Roll. During the spring of 2011, 269 student-athletes earned mention on the commissioner's honor roll.

== Awards ==
Throughout his career, Byrne has been recognized with the highest awards an athletics administrator can receive. Among his many accolades, honors include the U.S. Sports Academy 2007 Carl Maddox Sports Management Award; the 2002 National Football Foundation John L. Toner Award; the 1999 Central Region National Association of Collegiate Directors of Athletics (NACDA) Director of the Year; president of NACDA in 1991–92; and the National Athletic Fundraisers Association Fundraiser of the Year in 1985.

== Family ==
Byrne's wife of more than 40 years is Dr. Marilyn Kent Byrne, who has expertise in leadership development, team building, and executive coaching. The Byrnes have two sons: Bill III and Greg. Bill is a vice president of Visa USA in San Francisco, and Greg is the current director of athletics at the University of Alabama. Greg and his wife, Regina, live in Tuscaloosa, Alabama.

== Honors ==
- 2007 Carl Maddox Sports Management Award
- 2005 Professional Achievement Award presented by the Idaho State University Alumni Association
- 2002 John L. Toner Award winner
- 1999 Central Region National Association of Collegiate Directors of Athletics (NACDA) Director of the Year
- 1991–92 President of NACDA
- 1985 National Athletic Fundraisers Association Fundraiser of the Year.

== Championships ==
As an NCAA Division I athletic director

National Championships: 30
Conference championships: 143

At Texas A&M 2003–2012

National Championships: 17
Conference Championships: 44

At Nebraska 1992-2002

National Championships: 10
Conference championships: 83

At Oregon 1984-1992

National Championships: 3
Conference championships: 16
