= Milwaukee (Greenamyer) =

Sculpture in Wisconsin

Coordinates: 43.077436°N 87.881357°W

Milwaukee (Sculpture)
- Artist: George Mossman Greenamyer
- Year: 1989
- Dimensions: 5.5 m × 6.1 m × 1.5 m (18 ft × 20 ft × 5 ft)
- Location: Milwaukee

Milwaukee is a public artwork by Cleveland, Ohio artist George Mossman Greenamyer (b. 1939 - d. 2023), located at the University of Wisconsin–Milwaukee; Golda Meir Library, Milwaukee, Wisconsin, United States.

== Description ==
Painted steel, 18' high x 20'1" wide x 5' deep. Although the piece is entitled Milwaukee, agricultural iconography is included. The sculpture reads from left to right, starting with the Milwaukee Lighthouse, a lighthouse keeper at the harbor breakwater and a seaman standing on duty aboard a Great Lakes freighter and a workman holding a shovel on top of a grain elevator. The Urban scene begins with city folk nearby the U.S. Bank Center (Milwaukee), followed by Milwaukee City Hall and houses typical of early German and Polish immigrants. The most western part of the sculpture ends with a mailman delivering mail to a typical mid-western farmhouse, a cow, and a farm couple.

== Historical information ==
An addition to the Golda Meir Library in 1988 qualified UW-Milwaukee for the Percent for Art program created in 1980. The Wisconsin Arts Board administers Percent for Art and a gubernatorial-appointed committee reviews the artists' applications. In examining proposals for the Golda Meir Library site, the committee considered the works of fifty-six artists before selecting George Mossman Greenamyer.

=== Location history ===
Milwaukee has been located at the Golda Meir Library, 2311 East Hartford Avenue, since 1989.

The state of Wisconsin granted commission of $21,400 to the artist for the design, fabrication, and transportation of the work to the site. It was dedicated on May 2, 1989.

== Artist ==
Born in Cleveland, Ohio, Greenamyer received his BFA from the Philadelphia College of Art and his MFA in sculpture from the University of Kansas. First and foremost, Greenamyer considers himself a straightforward narrative sculptor. The public sculptures Greenamyer creates usually contain specific references to a community's history, architecture, and industry. He visits each site to talk with local people about the history and social background of the area. Then Greenamyer works the forge, hammering the steel into the ribbed structures on which the narrative portion rests. The pieces are welded, assembled, ground down, sandblasted, primed and painted. The buildings and figures were forged at the Carswell Sculpture & Ironworks in Marshfield, Massachusetts, before he trucked the pieces to Milwaukee. The Cardinal Fabricating Corporation in Milwaukee created the large black steel pedestal to the artist's specifications.
