= Mark Benson (engineer) =

German engineer

- Born: Mark Müller; June 19, 1888; Sudetenland (Bohemia)
- Known for: Inventor of the supercritical Benson boiler
- Engineering career
- Discipline: Mechanical Engineering
- Employers: English Electric Company, Siemens (licensed technology)
- Projects: Supercritical Benson boiler (Invented)

Mark Benson (born Mark Müller; Jun 19, 1888 – May 1965) was a Bohemian German engineer, best known as the inventor of a supercritical boiler.

Benson was born in the Sudetenland, and his original name was Müller (he changed his name during World War I to hide his German origin). He emigrated to the United States, then returned to Europe to work for the English Electric Company in Rugby. For English Electric he designed a relatively small steam generator (3 tons/hr), but with—for the time—very high pressure (supercritical) and without any drum. In 1922 Benson was granted a patent for this type of boiler.

In 1924, Siemens acquired the right to use Benson's patent, and in 1926–27 built the first large Benson boiler in Berlin-Gartenfeld. Siemens improved the technology and developed it as an internationally acknowledged standard for large steam generators. Since 1933 (until today) Siemens do not manufacture their own Benson boilers any more, but instead license the technology to others.

After his patent, Mark Benson did not make any further public appearances, but Siemens continued to use Benson as a registered trademark for this successful type of boiler, so the name is renowned worldwide in boiler engineering, although relatively little is known about the inventor behind it.
