= Three Bronze Discs =

Public artwork by James Wines

- Artist: James Wines
- Year: 1967
- Type: Bronze Sculpture
- Dimensions: 300 cm × 240 cm (120 in × 96 in); 150 cm diameter (60 in)
- Location: Milwaukee; 43.077169°N 87.880285°W
- Owner: University of Wisconsin Milwaukee

Three Bronze Discs is a piece of public artwork by American artist James Wines located in the courtyard of the Golda Meir Library, near Milwaukee, Wisconsin, United States. Made of bronze, the sculpture is three circular bronze discs located in a pool of water. It is 10 feet by 8 feet and 5 feet in diameter.

== Historical information ==
Three Bronze Discs was created for the then new Golda Meir Library at the University of Wisconsin–Milwaukee. It is set in a sunken brick courtyard outside the library. The building's architectural plan called for a sculpture, planter, and benches in the courtyard. Wines designed and molded Three Bronze Discs in plaster and the work was cast in bronze in Rome. According to Diane Buck, author of Outdoor Sculpture in Milwaukee, "The elements of the sculpture and its site represent one of the few local successful collaborations between artist and architect."

According to Kenneth Bendiner, chair of the art history department at UW-Milwaukee, "The sculpture mixes and matches suggestions of the organic and the mechanical, the human and the human-made. It is a work not likely to incite the animosity of coming generations. One of the reasons for the rise of 'abstract' monuments in the 1960s is their ability to avoid controversial social issues. At a time of racial strife, civil unrest, anti-war protest, etc., committees can avoid the problems of representing specific people or specific events or specific statements by erecting monuments with indefinite reference."

=== Location history ===
When the University of Wisconsin-Milwaukee was formed in 1956 from the Wisconsin State College-Milwaukee and the Extension Division downtown, there were only two academic units: the College of Letters and Science and the School of Education. The Kenwood Library (now Mellencamp Hall) continued to serve the school for a time, but as the growth of the university accelerated, it became apparent the Kenwood Library would be too small for the anticipated number of holdings. Construction began in 1967 on the first stage of a modular library building planned to provide for future growth. After additions in 1974 and 1987, the original size of the library doubled.

== Artist ==
A native of Chicago, James Wines grew up admiring the architecture of Louis Sullivan and Frank Lloyd Wright. After receiving his fine arts degree from the Syracuse University in 1956, Wines began competing for commissions which blended architecture and sculpture. Three Bronze Discs is one of his earliest commissions. He referred to the work as circular "geometric units designed in answer to the building's sharp angular feeling." The work is most effective as seen from different perspectives outside and inside the library, especially from the large window-encased stairwell overlooking the courtyard.
