= Milwaukee-Downer "Quad" =

- U.S. National Register of Historic Places
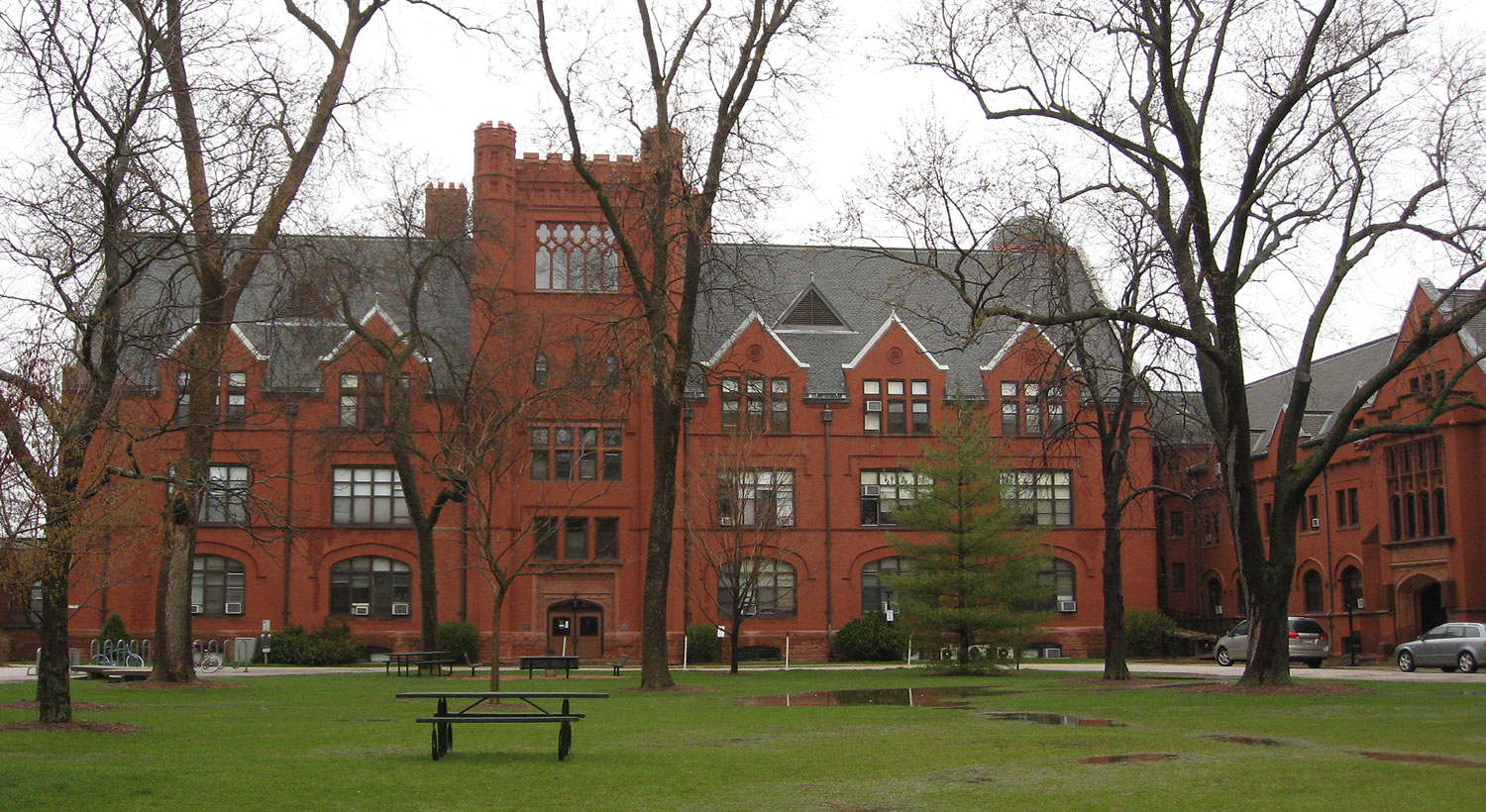
- This view is looking north at Merrill Hall, with Johnston Hall to the right. Holton Hall is out of view to the left.
- Location: 2512 E. Hartford St. Milwaukee, Wisconsin, U.S.
- Architect: Alexander C. Eschweiler
- Architectural style: Collegiate Gothic
- NRHP reference No.: 74000106
- Added to NRHP: January 17, 1974

The Milwaukee-Downer "Quad" is a set of four buildings of collegiate Gothic architecture on the campus of the University of Wisconsin–Milwaukee in Milwaukee, Wisconsin. Located at northwest corner of Hartford and Downer Avenues, the quad was designed by Alexander C. Eschweiler and built between 1897 and 1905 to house Milwaukee-Downer College. The complex was added to the National Register of Historic Places in 1974.

== History ==
Milwaukee-Downer College was formed in 1895, a merger of Milwaukee Female College and Downer College of Fox Lake - both early colleges for young women. With the merger, the new college began constructing buildings at a new site, which is now the Downer Quad.

Merrill Hall and Holton Halls were built from 1897 to 1899 - designed by Alexander Eschweiler. Merrill is Tudor Revival-ish in style, with walls of red sandstone and red brick, with a large square central tower with octagonal corner columns and parapeted gable fronts. It has a round observatory tower and a college chapel. Holton is styled similarly, with a gymnasium. When these buildings were complete in 1899, operations moved from their former locations.

Johnston and Greene Halls were added in the next seven years. Johnston is similar in style to the others, a bookend opposite Holton - decorated with a string course with carved human heads and grotesques. Greene Hall is a smaller chapel-like building behind Johnston.

In 1964, Milwaukee-Downer College was consolidated with Lawrence University in Appleton, Wisconsin. The University of Wisconsin–Milwaukee purchased the site and it became part of the university's campus.
