= AEP Building =

Skyscraper in Columbus, Ohio

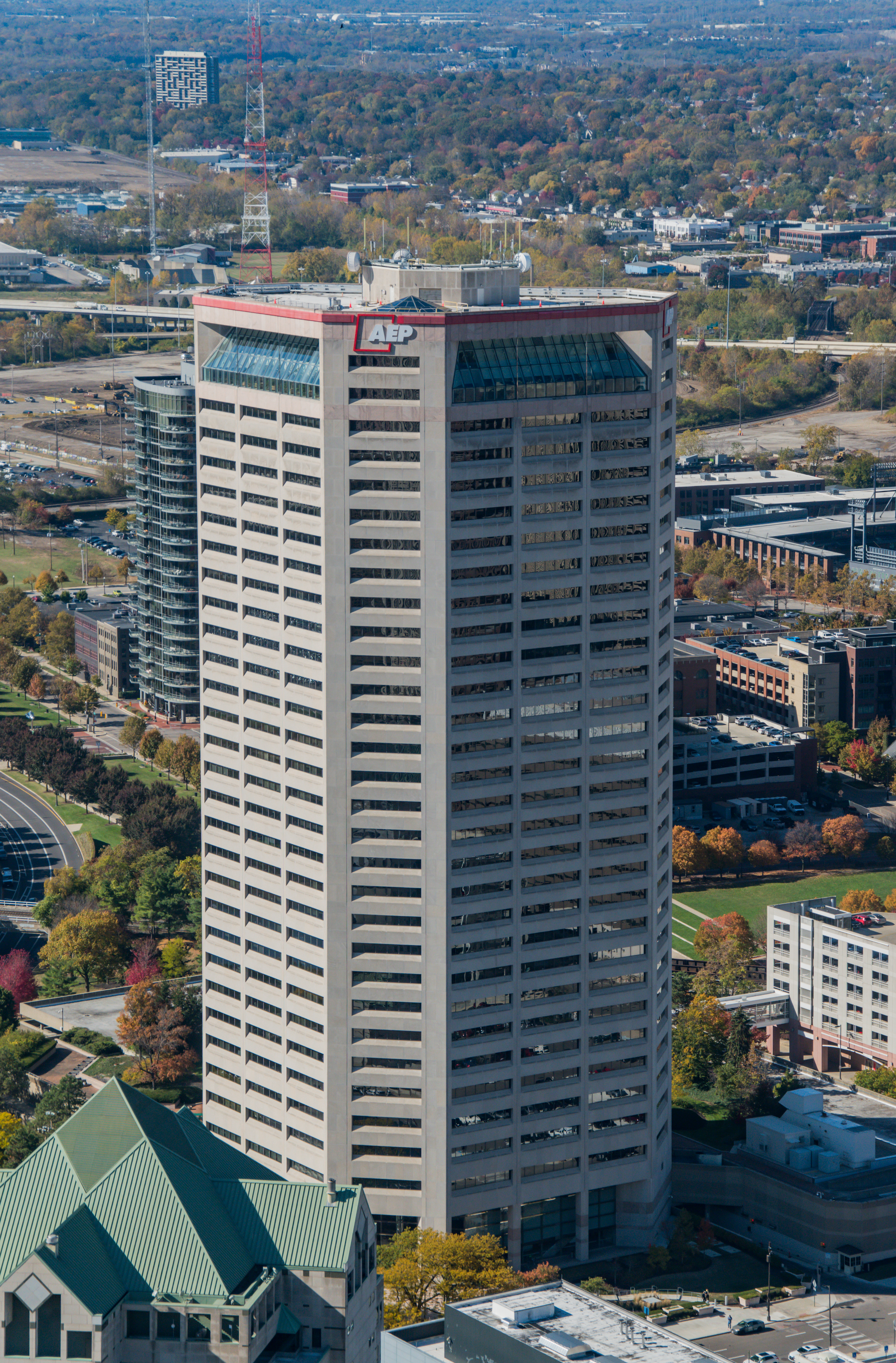
- View from Rhodes State Office Tower
- Interactive map of the AEP Building area

General information
- Type: Office
- Location: 1 Riverside Plaza, Columbus, Ohio
- Coordinates: 39.964949°N 83.005781°W
- Completed: 1983; 43 years ago

Height
- Roof: 456 ft (139 m)

Technical details
- Floor count: 31
- Floor area: 759,997 sq ft (70,606.0 m^{2})

Design and construction
- Architect: Abramovitz, Harris & Kingsland
- Main contractor: Turner Construction Company

The AEP Building is a 456 ft-tall (139 m) skyscraper in Downtown Columbus, Ohio. It was completed in 1983 and has 31 floors. Abramovitz, Harris & Kingsland designed the building following a modernist architectural style. The AEP Building is the 8th tallest building in Columbus. It has served as the headquarters of the American Electric Power (AEP) since the company relocated from New York City in 1983.

== History ==
In 1979, American Electric Power (AEP) confirmed the company would be moving their headquarters from New York City to Columbus, Ohio. This move was part of the 1968 acquisition deal to merge with the Columbus and Southern Ohio Electric Co (C&SOE). To encourage 1,500 New York employees to relocate, AEP offered relocation assistance, including rent stabilization for 36 months, an interest-free loan when purchasing a home, a company contribution towards the cost of a car, and travel reimbursement.

In July 1980, the company announced its plans to build a 32-story headquarters in downtown Columbus on a 5.3-acre site between Spring and Long Streets. The building was designed by and Abramovitz, Harris & Kingsland and takes cues from the nearby Nationwide Building and surrounded by parkland. The all-electric building was designed with eight-sides to conserve energy.

At the front of the building are two sculptures created by George Greenamyer. The sculptures were turbine rotors, which came from the former Philo Power Plant in Philo, Ohio and the Twin Branch Power Plant in Mishawaka, Indiana. The sculptures were designed to pay tribute to the high tech history of the electric industry.

== See also ==
- List of tallest buildings in Columbus, Ohio
