= Philo Power Plant =

Power plant in Muskingum County, Ohio, U.S.

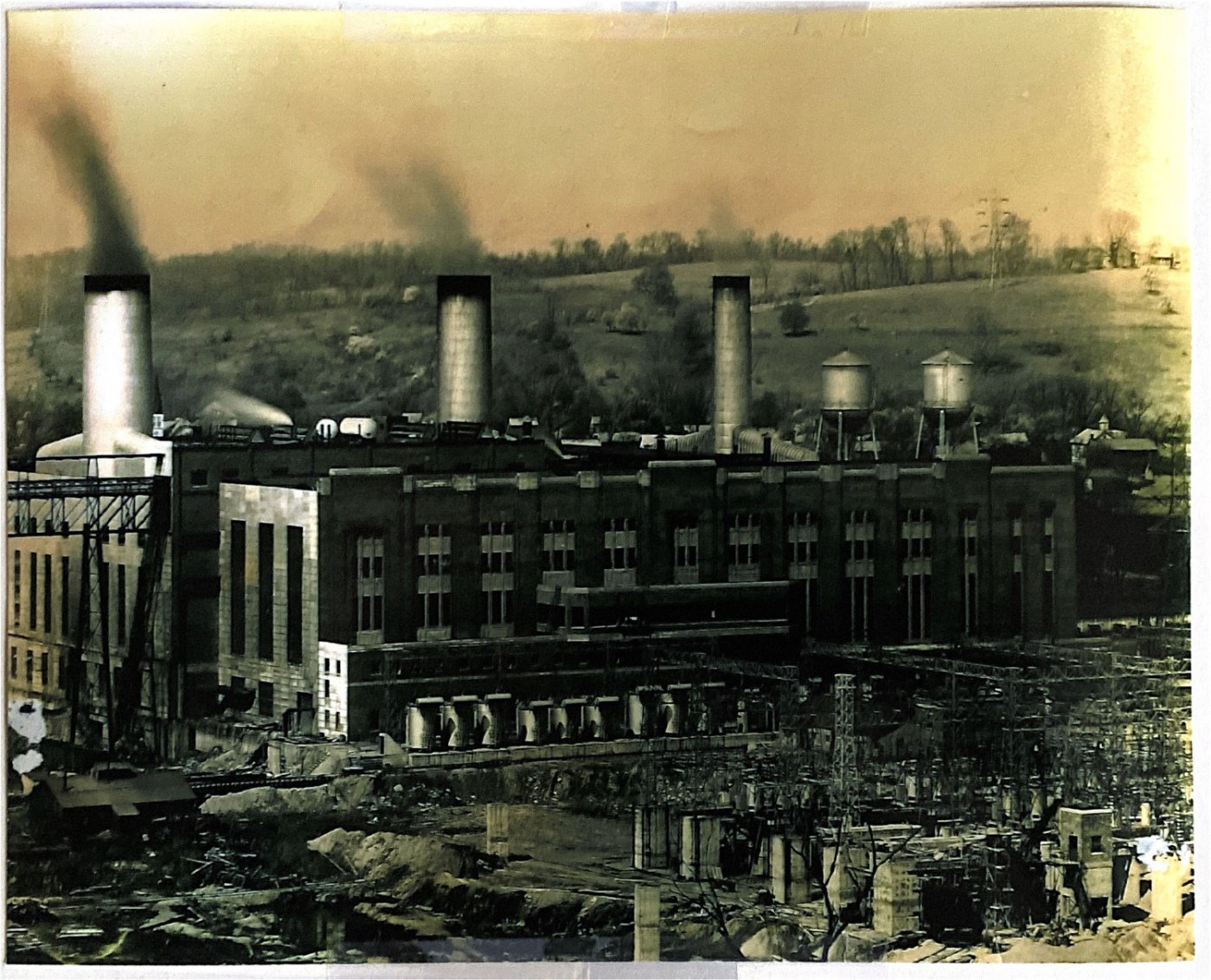
- Philo Power Plant following the completion of Unit 3 in 1929
- Country: United States
- Location: Philo, Ohio
- Coordinates: 39°51′52″N 81°54′15″W
- Status: Demolished
- Commission date: Unit 1: 1924; Unit 2: 1925; Unit 3: 1929; Unit 4: 1941; Unit 5: 1942; Unit 6: 1957
- Decommission date: Unit 1: 1957; Units 2–6: 1975
- Owner: Ohio Power
- Operator: Ohio Power

Thermal power station
- Primary fuel: Coal
- Cooling source: Muskingum River

Power generation
- Nameplate capacity: 510 MW

The Philo Power Plant was a 510 megawatt (MW), coal power plant located in Philo in Muskingum County, Ohio. It was the first power plant in the United States to apply steam reheat and supercritical steam generator technologies for its turbines. The plant had six units and its operations were handled by Ohio Power, a forerunner of American Electric Power (AEP). It operated from 1924 until ceasing in 1975.

== History ==
Construction of the Philo Power Plant began in 1922 with the plant designed by Sargent & Lundy. Philo began commercial generation with Unit 1 in 1924. This unit initially had a nameplate capacity of 35 MW from General Electric's curtis turbine, but was raised to 40 MW after performing well on its test run. The turbine had a maximum pressure of 600 psi (4,100 kPa) and temperature of about 725 °F (385 °C). It was the first unit in the country that utilized steam reheat. Unit 1 was decommissioned and replaced by Unit 6 in 1957. Unit 2 was completed in 1925 and also had a nameplate capacity of 40 MW. The total cost of both units was $10 million. Unit 3 was completed in 1929 with a nameplate capacity of 165 MW. The total cost to construct Unit 3 was $17 million. Units 4 and 5 were completed in 1941 and 1942 respectively and each had a nameplate capacity of 85 MW.

== Philo Unit 6 ==
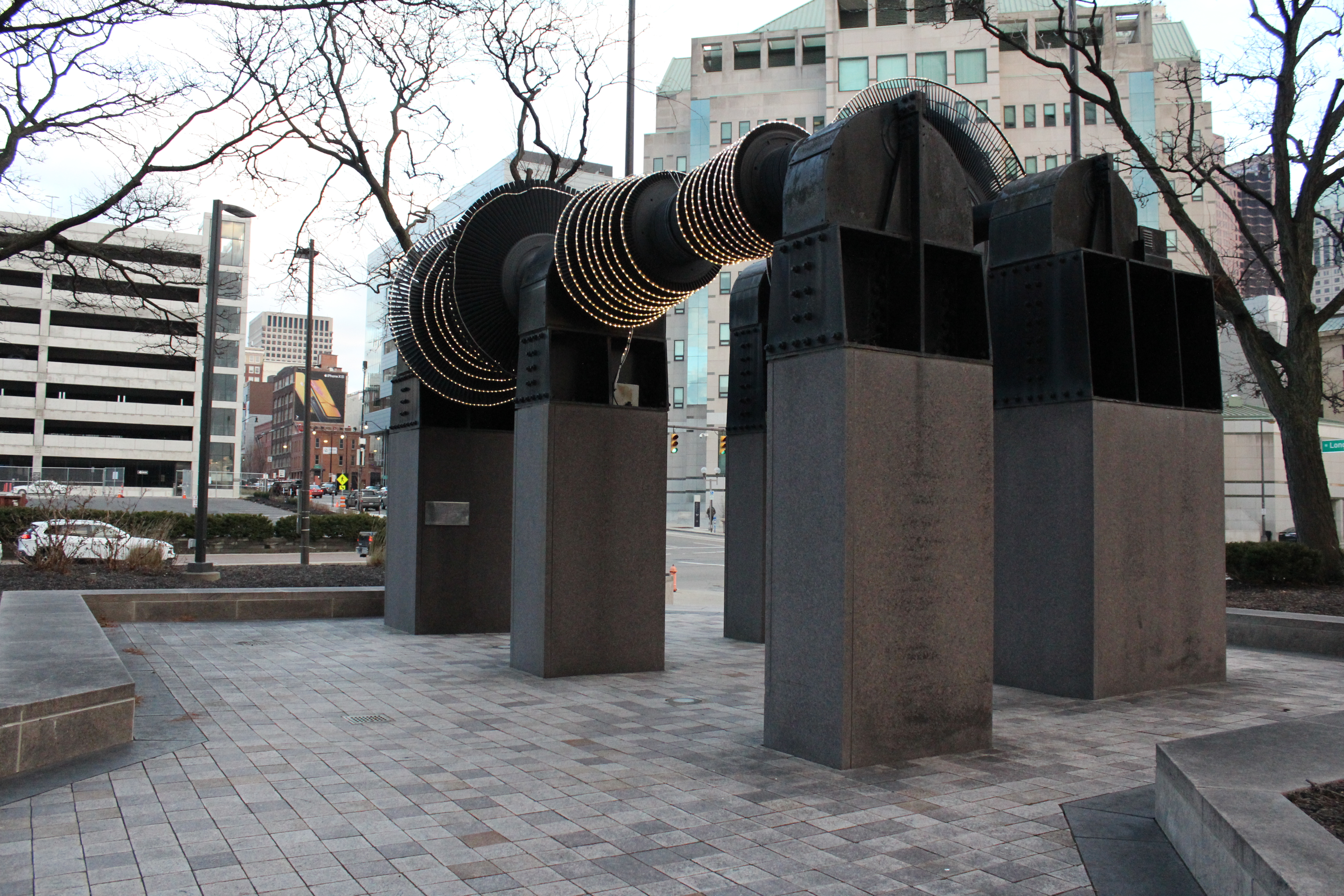
Philo Unit 6's turbine in the foreground at the AEP Building in Columbus, Ohio

Philo Unit 6 was the nation's first commercial supercritical steam generator. The unit began commercial generation in 1957 with nameplate capacity of 120 MW. Its steam generator, designed and built by Babcock & Wilcox, had a maximum pressure of 4,500 psi (31,000 kPa) and an operating temperature of about 1,150 °F (621 °C). Its steam turbine was designed and built by General Electric that made 3,600 rpm. The unit was able to demonstrate operations at ultrasupercritical levels, but due to the lack of metals able to tolerate the extreme temperatures, the levels were unsustainable. To support the new unit, a 183 ft (56 m) smokestack was erected. The total cost to construct Philo Unit 6 was approximately $19.5 million.

== Operations ==
When Philo began operations, the plant maintained a thermal efficiency of 24% consuming 14,000 BTU. Coal used by the plant came by either rail or river barge. Most of the coal burned at Philo was mined within the State of Ohio with some coal coming from West Virginia. Water was sourced from the Muskingum River with its intake being above a dam and was discharged below the dam. At the time of its deactivation, 203 employees worked at the plant.

== Closure and demolition ==
Philo was deactivated on May 31, 1975. The company cited declining electricity demand during the 1973–75 recession and the facility being surpassed by newer, more efficient power plants. The plant went on standby following deactivation with a single unit used to regulate voltage. Ohio Power remained optimistic that Philo would be reactivated. The plant was eventually demolished in 1983. After the Philo Power Plant was demolished, the rotors from the turbine from Unit 6 were utilized in a sculpture created by George Greenamyer. The sculpture was unveiled in October 1983 as a part of a landscape design project for the newly built AEP Building located in Columbus, Ohio.

== See also ==
- List of power stations in Ohio
