= Supercritical steam generator =

"Boiler" operating at supercritical pressure and temperature

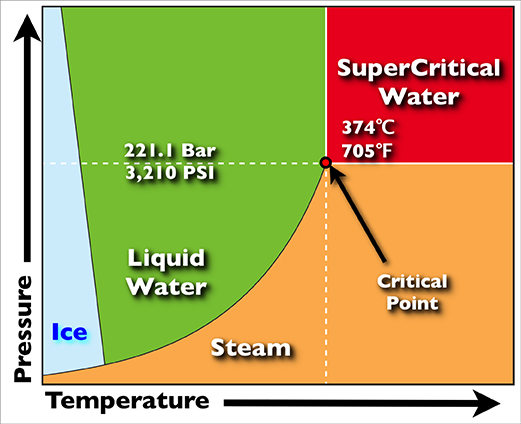
Supercritical water exists at temperatures above 374 °C and pressures above 220 atmospheres.

Diagram of a supercritical water-cooled nuclear reactor

A supercritical steam generator is a type of boiler that operates at supercritical pressure and temperature, frequently used in the production of electric power.

In contrast to a subcritical boiler in which steam bubbles form, a supercritical steam generator operates above the critical pressure – 22 megapascals (3,200 psi) and temperature 374 °C (705 °F). Under these conditions, the liquid water density decreases smoothly with no phase change, becoming indistinguishable from steam. The water temperature drops below the critical point as it does work in a high pressure turbine and enters the generator's condenser, resulting in slightly less fuel use. The efficiency of power plants with supercritical steam generators is higher than with subcritical steam because thermodynamic efficiency is directly related to the magnitude of their temperature drop. At supercritical pressure the higher temperature steam is converted more efficiently to mechanical energy in the turbine (as given by Carnot's theorem).

Technically, the term "boiler" is incorrect for a supercritical pressure steam generator because boiling does not occur.

== History of supercritical steam generation ==
Contemporary supercritical steam generators are sometimes referred to as Benson boilers. In 1922, Mark Benson was granted a patent for a boiler designed to convert water into steam at high pressure.

Safety was the main concern behind Benson's concept. Earlier steam generators were designed for relatively low pressures of up to about 100 bar (10 MPa; 1,450 psi), corresponding to the state of the art in steam turbine development at the time. One of their distinguishing technical characteristics was the riveted water/steam separator drum. These drums were where the water filled tubes were terminated after having passed through the boiler furnace.

These header drums were intended to be partially filled with water and above the water there was a baffle filled space where the boiler's steam and water vapour collected. The entrained water droplets were collected by the baffles and returned to the water pan. The mostly-dry steam was piped out of the drum as the separated steam output of the boiler. These drums were often the source of boiler explosions, usually with catastrophic consequences.

However, this drum could be completely eliminated if the evaporation separation process was avoided altogether. This would happen if water entered the boiler at a pressure above the critical pressure (3,206 pounds per square inch, 22.10 MPa); was heated to a temperature above the critical temperature (706 °F, 374 °C) and then expanded (through a simple nozzle) to dry steam at some lower subcritical pressure. This could be obtained at a throttle valve located downstream of the evaporator section of the boiler.

As development of Benson technology continued, boiler design soon moved away from the original concept introduced by Mark Benson. In 1929, a test boiler that had been built in 1927 began operating in the thermal power plant at Gartenfeld in Berlin for the first time in subcritical mode with a fully open throttle valve. The second Benson boiler began operation in 1930 without a pressurizing valve at pressures between 40 and 180 bar (4 and 18 MPa; 580 and 2,611 psi) at the Berlin cable factory. This application represented the birth of the modern variable-pressure Benson boiler. After that development, the original patent was no longer used. The "Benson boiler" name, however, was retained.

1957: Unit 6 at the Philo Power Plant in Philo, Ohio was the first commercial supercritical steam-electric generating unit in the world, and it could operate short-term at ultra-supercritical levels. It took until 2012 for the first US coal-fired plant designed to operate at ultra-supercritical temperatures to be opened, John W. Turk Jr. Coal Plant in Arkansas.

Two innovations have been projected to improve once-through steam generators:

- A new type of heat-recovery steam generator based on the Benson boiler has operated successfully at the Cottam combined-cycle power plant in central England.
- The vertical tubing in the combustion chamber walls of coal-fired steam generators combines the operating advantages of the Benson system with the design advantages of the drum-type boiler. Construction of a first reference plant, the Yaomeng power plant in China, commenced in 2001.

On 3 June 2014, the Australian government's research organization CSIRO announced that they had generated 'supercritical steam' at a pressure of 23.5 MPa (3,410 psi) and 570 °C (1,060 °F) in what it claims is a world record for solar thermal energy.

== Definitions ==
These definitions regarding steam generation were found in a report on coal production in China investigated by the Center for American Progress.

- Subcritical – up to 705 °F (374 °C) and 3,208 psi (221.2 bar) (the critical point of water)
- Supercritical – up to the 1,000–1,050 °F (538–566 °C); requires advanced materials
- Ultra-supercritical – up to 1,400 °F (760 °C) and pressure levels of 5,000 psi (340 bar) (additional innovations, not specified, would allow even more efficiency)

Nuclear power plant steam typically enters turbines at subcritical values – for U-Tube Steam Generators 77 bar (1,117 psi) and 294 °C (561 °F), with comparable temperature and pressure for Once Through Steam Generators type.

The term "advanced ultra-supercritical" (AUSC) or "700°C technology" is sometimes used to describe generators where the water is above 700 °C (1,292 °F).

The term High-Efficiency, Low-Emissions ("HELE") has been used by the coal industry to describe supercritical and ultra-supercritical coal generation.

Industry leading (as of 2019) Mitsubishi Hitachi Power Systems charts its gas turbine combined cycle power generation efficiency (lower heating value) at well under 55% for gas turbine inlet temp of 1,250 °C (2,282 °F), roughly 56% for 1,400 °C (2,552 °F), about 58% for 1,500 °C (2,732 °F), and 64% for 1,600 °C (2,912 °F), all of which far exceed (due to Carnot efficiency) thresholds for AUSC or Ultra-supercritical technology, which are still limited by the steam temperature.

== See also ==
- Supercritical water reactor
