= University of Wisconsin–Milwaukee =

Public university in Milwaukee, Wisconsin, US

- Former names: Milwaukee Normal School (1885–1927); Milwaukee State Teachers College (1927–1951); Wisconsin State College of Milwaukee (1951–1956)
- Type: Public research university
- Established: 1956; 70 years ago
- Parent institution: University of Wisconsin System
- Accreditation: HLC
- Academic affiliations: CUMU; GCU; USU
- Endowment: $323 million (2023)
- Budget: $685 million (2023)
- Chancellor: Thomas J. Gibson
- Faculty: 684 (2023)
- Students: 22,937 (2023)
- Undergraduates: 18,445 (2023)
- Postgraduates: 4,492 (2023)
- Location: Milwaukee, Wisconsin, United States; 43.0750°N 87.8829°W
- Campus: 104 acres (42 ha); Large City
- Other campuses: Waukesha
- Newspaper: UWM Post
- Colors: Black and gold
- Nickname: Panthers
- Sporting affiliations: NCAA Division I – Horizon League
- Mascot: Pounce Panther
- Website: www.uwm.edu

The University of Wisconsin–Milwaukee (UW–Milwaukee, UWM, or Milwaukee) is a public urban research university in Milwaukee, Wisconsin, United States. It is the largest university in the Milwaukee metropolitan area and one of two doctorate-granting research universities in the University of Wisconsin System. As of 2025, UW–Milwaukee had an enrollment of about 23,000 students, including 19,217 undergraduates and 3,887 postgraduates.

The university offers over 200 degree programs across 14 schools and colleges, including the only graduate school of freshwater science in the U.S., the first CEPH accredited dedicated school of public health in Wisconsin, and the state's only school of architecture. The university is classified among "R1: Doctoral Universities – Very high research activity". In 2018, the university had a research expenditure of $55 million.

The university's athletic teams are the Milwaukee Panthers. A total of 15 Panther athletic teams compete in NCAA Division I. Panthers have won the James J. McCafferty Trophy as the Horizon League's all-sports champions seven times since 2000. They have earned 133 Horizon League titles and made 40 NCAA tournament appearances as of 2016.

== History ==
=== Early history ===
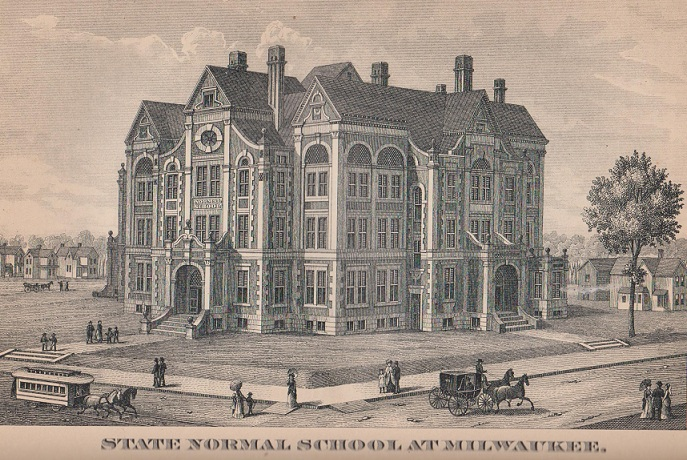
Illustration of the State Normal School at Milwaukee, published in the 1885 edition of the Wisconsin Blue Book

In 1885, the Wisconsin State Normal School opened for classes at 18th and Wells in downtown Milwaukee. The first president was John Mapel, an alumnus of the University of Wisconsin–Madison who had previously been the superintendent of schools in Iowa. His ideas for the curriculum were largely influenced by a tour he took through Europe prior to his job in Iowa. Over the next 42 years, the Milwaukee State Normal School saw seven different presidents, the addition of music and liberal arts programs and rapid growth from an initial enrollment of 76. In 1909, the school moved from downtown to the current location near the lakefront when a new building, now Mitchell Hall, was completed. In 1927, the Milwaukee normal school changed its name to Wisconsin State Teachers College-Milwaukee in an effort by the State Normal School Regents to refocus on the instruction of teachers. The college became one of the nation's top teacher's training colleges in the 1940s. In 1951, the Legislature empowered all state colleges to offer liberal arts programs. The Milwaukee State Teachers College subsequently became Wisconsin State College–Milwaukee, but was still casually referred to as "Milwaukee State," as it had been throughout its previous incarnations; also retaining the green and white school colors and Green Gulls mascot.

=== University of Wisconsin–Milwaukee ===
University of Wisconsin–Milwaukee was founded with the belief that Milwaukee needed a great public university to become a great city. In 1955, the Wisconsin state legislature passed a bill to create a large public university that offered graduate programs in Wisconsin's largest city. In 1956, Wisconsin State College-Milwaukee merged with the University of Wisconsin–Extension's Milwaukee division (a graduate branch of the University of Wisconsin–Madison) to form the University of Wisconsin–Milwaukee. The new university consisted of the WSC campus near the lakefront and the University of Wisconsin extension building in downtown Milwaukee. The first commencement of the new University of Wisconsin–Milwaukee was held on June 16, 1957. On June 13, 1958, Socialist mayor Frank P. Zeidler was the first person to receive an honorary doctorate from the university.

In 1964, the campus of the neighboring private women's institution, Milwaukee-Downer College, was purchased by the state to expand the UWM campus; Milwaukee-Downer College had previously merged with Lawrence College to form the present Lawrence University in Appleton, Wisconsin. The university had already purchased the former campuses and buildings of the former Milwaukee-Downer Seminary and Milwaukee University School along Hartford Avenue.

From 1956 to 1971, UW–Milwaukee, UW–Madison, and the latter's affiliated 10 freshman-sophomore centers and statewide extensions (University of Wisconsin–Extension) were part of the original University of Wisconsin System. In 1971, the state legislature merged this entity with the Wisconsin State Universities to form a united University of Wisconsin System under a single board of regents. In 1988, the UW System designated eight Centers of Excellence at UWM. In 1994, UWM was designated a Research II University (now a Doctoral/Research University-Extensive) by the Carnegie Foundation.

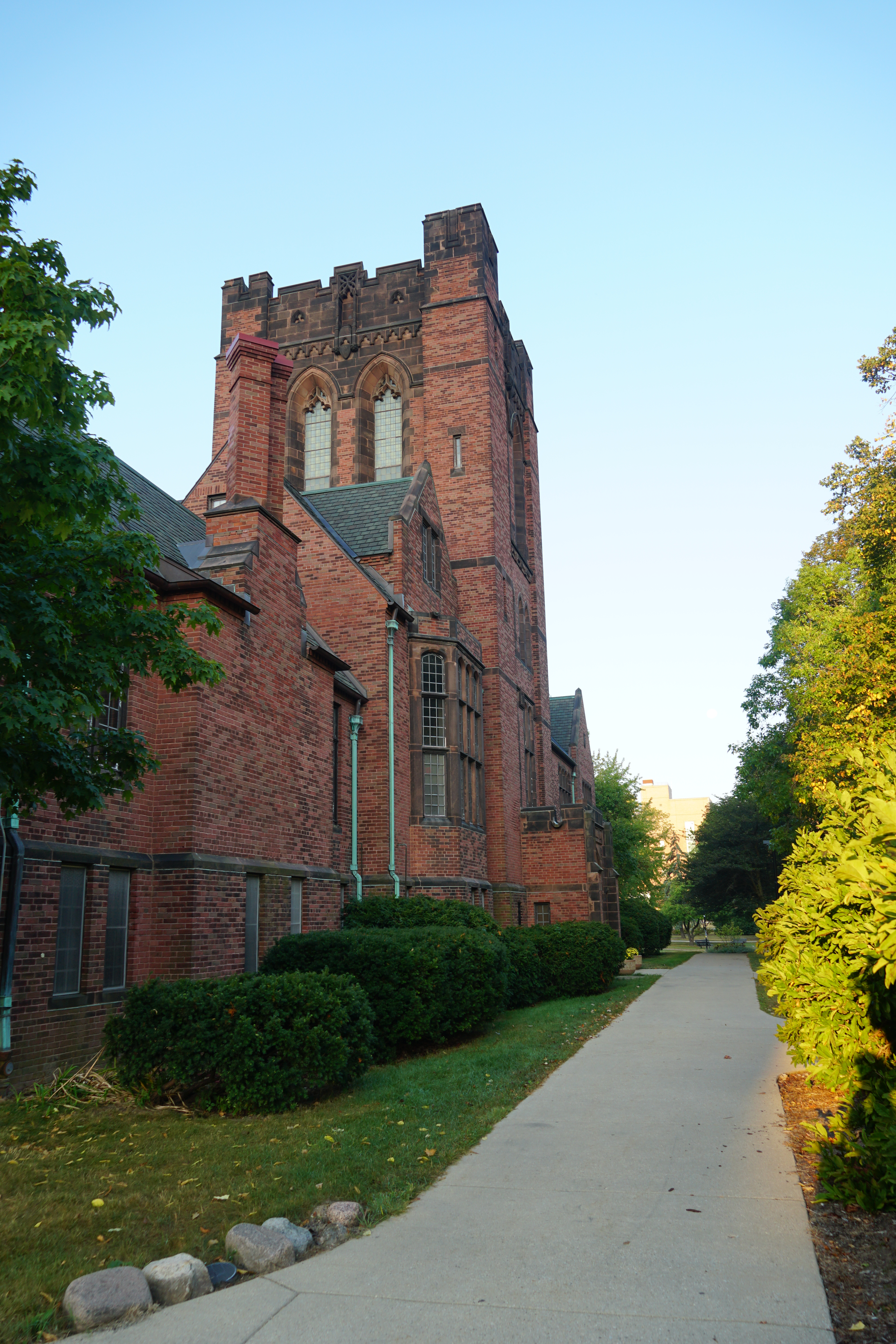
Chapman Hall

UWM has expanded to 12 schools and colleges and now offers 88 undergraduate programs and 48 graduate programs, including 22 doctoral degree programs, with a university-wide focus on academic research, teaching and community service. In 2005, UW–Milwaukee surpassed UW–Madison in the number of Wisconsin resident students and became the university with the largest enrollment of Wisconsin residents.

In 2006, UW–Milwaukee was ranked as the ninth best "Saviors of Our Cities" by the New England Board of Higher Education (NEBHE), because of its strong positive contribution of careful strategic planning and thoughtful use of resources that have dramatically strengthened the economy and quality of life of Milwaukee, and was voted by the public as one of the top ten "Gems of Milwaukee".

In 2008 and 2009, the school saw the establishments of the School of Public Health and the School of Freshwater Sciences. In 2010, UW–Milwaukee purchased its neighboring Columbia St. Mary's Hospital complex. In the early 2011, UW-Milwaukee closed the land purchase for its Innovation Park in Wauwatosa.

== Campus ==
The 104-acre (42 ha) UWM campus is located in a residential area on Milwaukee's upper East Side. The campus is five blocks from the shoreline of Lake Michigan, and is less than a ten-minute drive from downtown Milwaukee. The Milwaukee County Transit System provides the campus with access to public bus transportation in Milwaukee. The campus is divided into central, north, west, and northwest quads. In addition to the campus proper, UWM incorporates a large number of other sites throughout the Milwaukee metropolitan area.

=== Central Quad ===
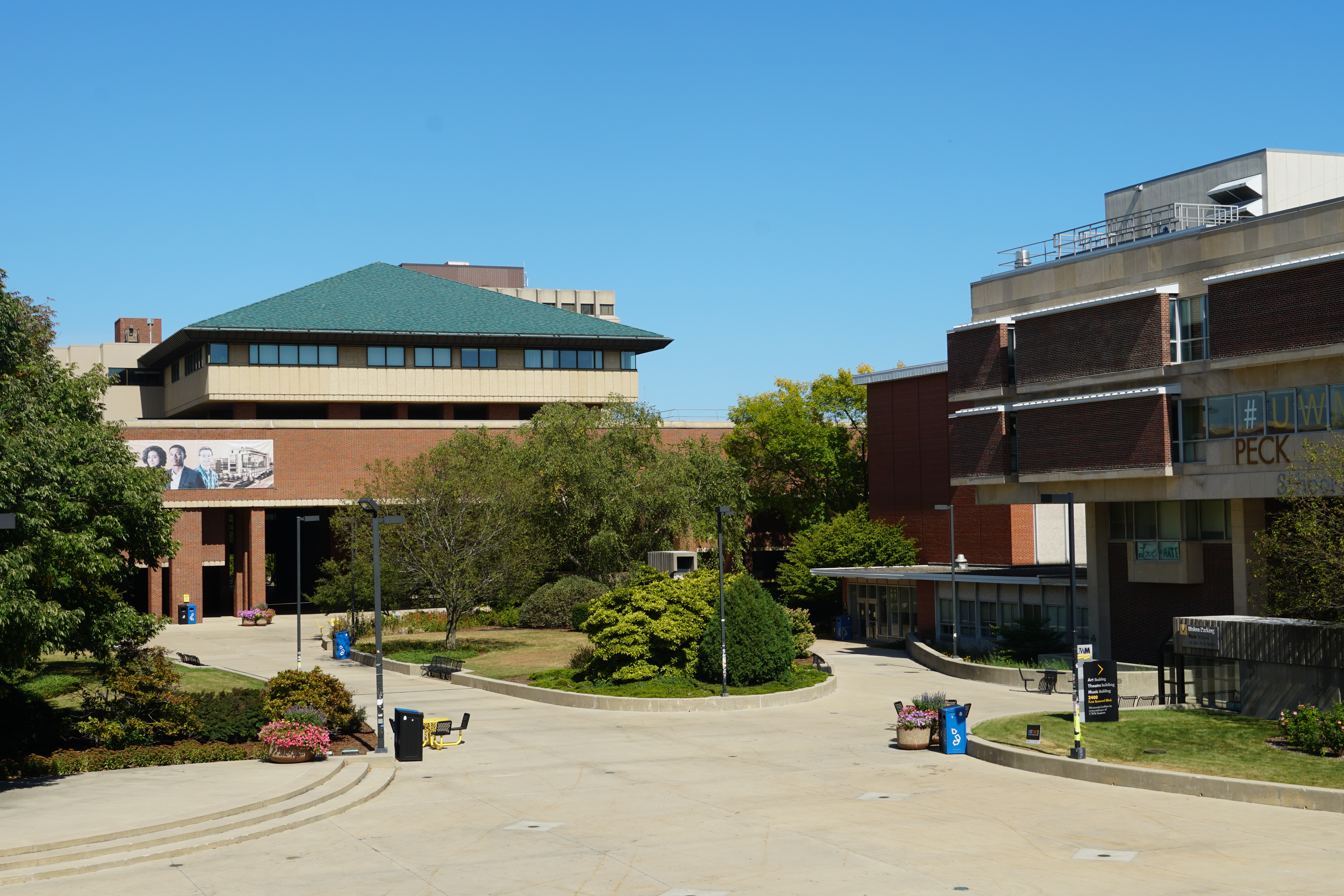
Golda Meir Library and Spaights Plaza

The north end of the Central Quad is the UWM Golda Meir Library, a major library of the country. The library consists of three parts: the West Wing, East Wing and the conference center on the top level of the East Wing. The West Wing and the East Wing were completed in 1967 and 1974 separately. The two structures are joined by passageways in the basement and on the second and third floors. The northern extensions of the East and West Wings and a fourth floor conference center facility were completed in 1987. In 1979, the Library was named for Golda Meir, the fourth Prime Minister of Israel, who attended Milwaukee State Normal School, a UWM predecessor institution.

The south end of the Central Quad is anchored by the UWM Student Union, the center of student and campus life for UWM. At 350,000 square feet (33,000 m^{2}), the Student Union is one of the largest student centers in the nation, and its 26,000 plus visitors a day during the spring and fall academic terms makes the Union one of the busiest buildings in Wisconsin on a daily basis. Golda Meir Library on the north and the Student Union on the south are connected by the Ernest Spaights Plaza, the central commons for UWM and the roof level of the 480 vehicle Union parking structure. Overtowering the Ernest Spaights Plaza to the west is Bolton Hall which houses the Departments of Sociology, Anthropology, Political Science, Economics, Urban Studies, and Geography, as well as many student support centers including the Student Success Center and the Office of Undergraduate Research (OUR).

West of Bolton Hall is Lubar Hall, home of Sheldon B. Lubar School of Business. This four-story facility consists of 150,000 square feet (14,000 m^{2}) of classroom, computer labs and office space and can accommodate 2,000 students in its instructional facilities at one time. Originally constructed in 1995 as the Business Administration Building, it was renamed in 2006, Lubar Hall in honor of Sheldon B. Lubar, a prominent Milwaukee businessman, civic leader and philanthropist. Lubar is founder and chairman of Lubar & Company, Inc., a private investment firm. His commitment to UWM and higher education spans more than three decades including service as a past president of the University of Wisconsin System Board of Regents. Lubar's distinguished career of public service also includes his work as Assistant Secretary of the U.S. Department of Housing and Urban Development and Commissioner of the Federal Housing Administration. The building's original automated light and temperature controls featured a system called The Lighting Showcase by the Wisconsin Electric Power Company. It was designed to provide maximum energy efficiency for the most highly utilized academic building on the UWM campus. In addition to providing nearly 200 offices, there are three lecture halls, with a total of 785 seats; seven arc-shaped classrooms; ten U-shaped classrooms; an Executive MBA classroom; three computer labs; and two levels of underground parking. In 2023, Jeff Yabuki was named the Sheldon B. Lubar executive-in-residence.

On the east side of the Ernest Spaights Plaza are the Art building, Music building, and the Theatre building which are all indirectly connected through a series of basement hallways, and on the second floor. These buildings make up what is part of the Peck School of the Arts. Main buildings on the east side of the central quad include Mitchell Hall, sometimes known as "Old Main," which was the home of the original Milwaukee State Teachers College; Garland and Pearse Halls (which formerly housed Milwaukee-Downer Seminary); Curtin Hall; etc.

=== North Quad ===
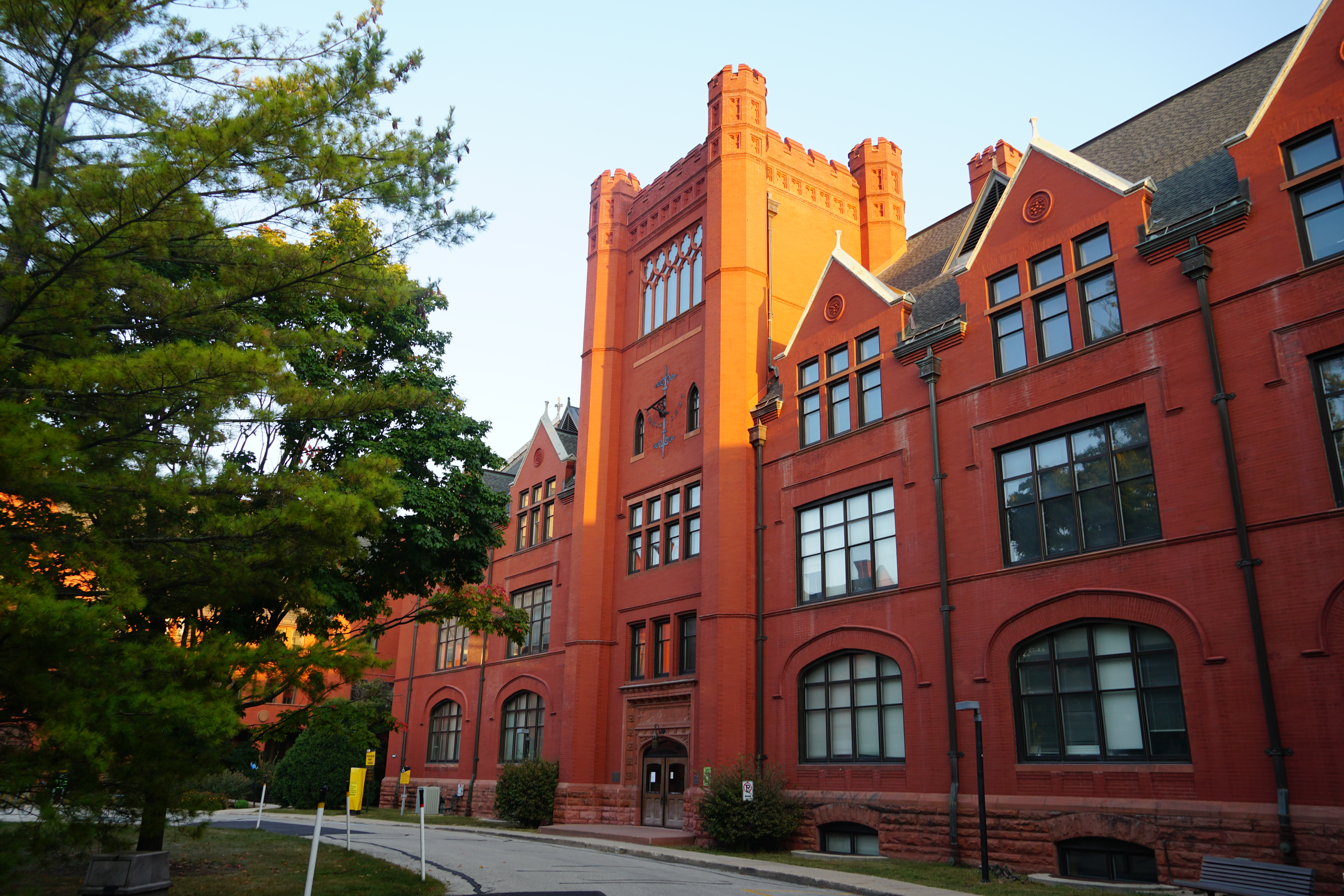
Merrill Hall is part of the original Milwaukee-Downer College campus.

The north side of the North Quad contains the Downer Woods, a wooded area and conservation center. On the west side of North Quad are the Sandburg Residence Halls, a complex comprising four high-rise dormitories. Sandburg Residence Hall houses about 2,700 students.

In the central part of North Quad, there are the school's indoor sports facilities the Klotsche Center and its new addition the Pavilion. Next to the indoor sports facilities is Chapman Hall and the 11-story Enderis Hall, which houses the College of Health Sciences, School of Education, and the Helen Bader School of Social Welfare.

The east side of the North Quad is a group of old red buildings, including Holton Hall, Merrill Hall, Johnston Hall, Sabin Hall, and others. These older buildings were acquired by the university in the Milwaukee-Downer College campus purchase. The Milwaukee-Downer "Quad" (Holton, Johnston, Merrill and Greene Halls) was added to the National Register of Historic Places in 1974.

=== West Quad ===
The West Quad is the location for the College of Engineering and Applied Science, the College of Nursing, the School of Architecture and Urban Planning, and the natural science departments. The College of Engineering and Applied Science is housed in the EMS building. The Physics Building is to the south, and the Chemistry Building and Lapham Hall (housing the Biology and Geosciences Departments, as well as the Thomas A. Greene Memorial Museum) are to the east. Cunningham Hall on the northwest side houses the College of Nursing.

The award-winning Architecture and Urban Planning Building on the east side of the West Quad was completed in 1993. With more than 143,000 square feet (13,300 m^{2}), it is one of the largest school of architecture buildings built in the U.S. in the last forty years. The exterior of the L-shaped building has brick walls accented by metal panels and large windows. Full glass walls facing onto the central courtyard afford a view of that area from almost every room in the building. Inside, the air ducts, light fixtures and structural system have been left exposed, providing a unique architectural teaching environment. The building includes student design studios, classrooms, a lecture hall, exhibition areas, computer labs, offices, a media and photography center, and research centers.

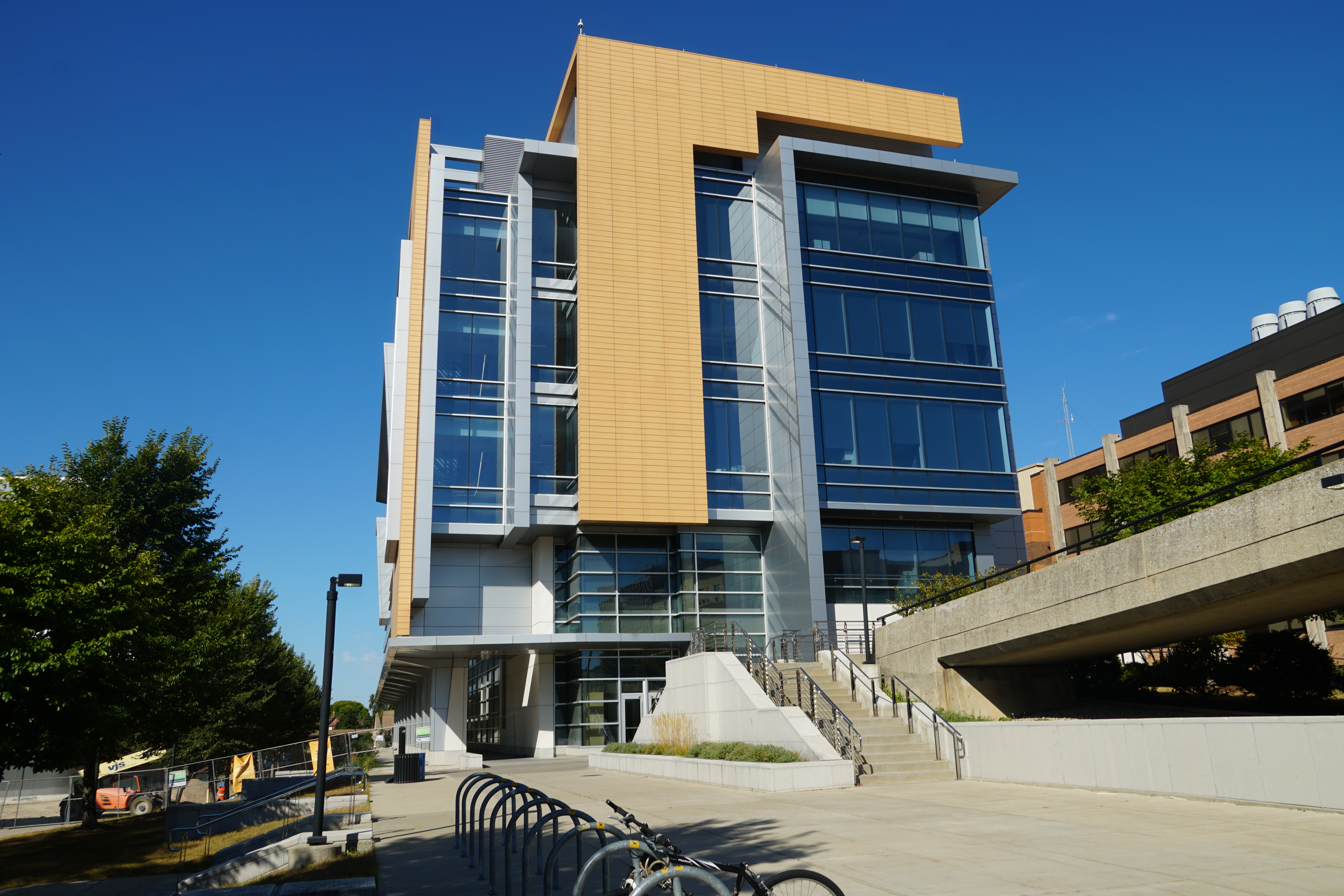
The Kenwood Interdisciplinary Research Complex, built in 2015, houses research labs and other STEM programs.

In October 2015, the university unveiled the Kenwood Interdisciplinary Research Complex, a distinctive 141,000 square-foot building at a cost of $80 million.

In May 2019, UWM opened the UWM Lubar Entrepreneurship Center and UWM Welcome Center in a new $8.3 million building, sitting just south of the Kenwood Interdisciplinary Research Complex.

Surrounded by the buildings in the West Quad is Engelmann Stadium, home to the Milwaukee Panthers men's and women's soccer teams. Built in 1973, the 2,000-capacity stadium is tucked between buildings in the middle of the West Quad, making it a unique stadium among American sports venues. Engelmann Stadium is home to the longest-running in-season tournament in NCAA Division I men's soccer, the Panther Invitational. UWM has hosted the event annually since the program's inception in 1973, save for the 1990 season. The tournament entered its 38th year in 2012.

=== Northwest Quad ===
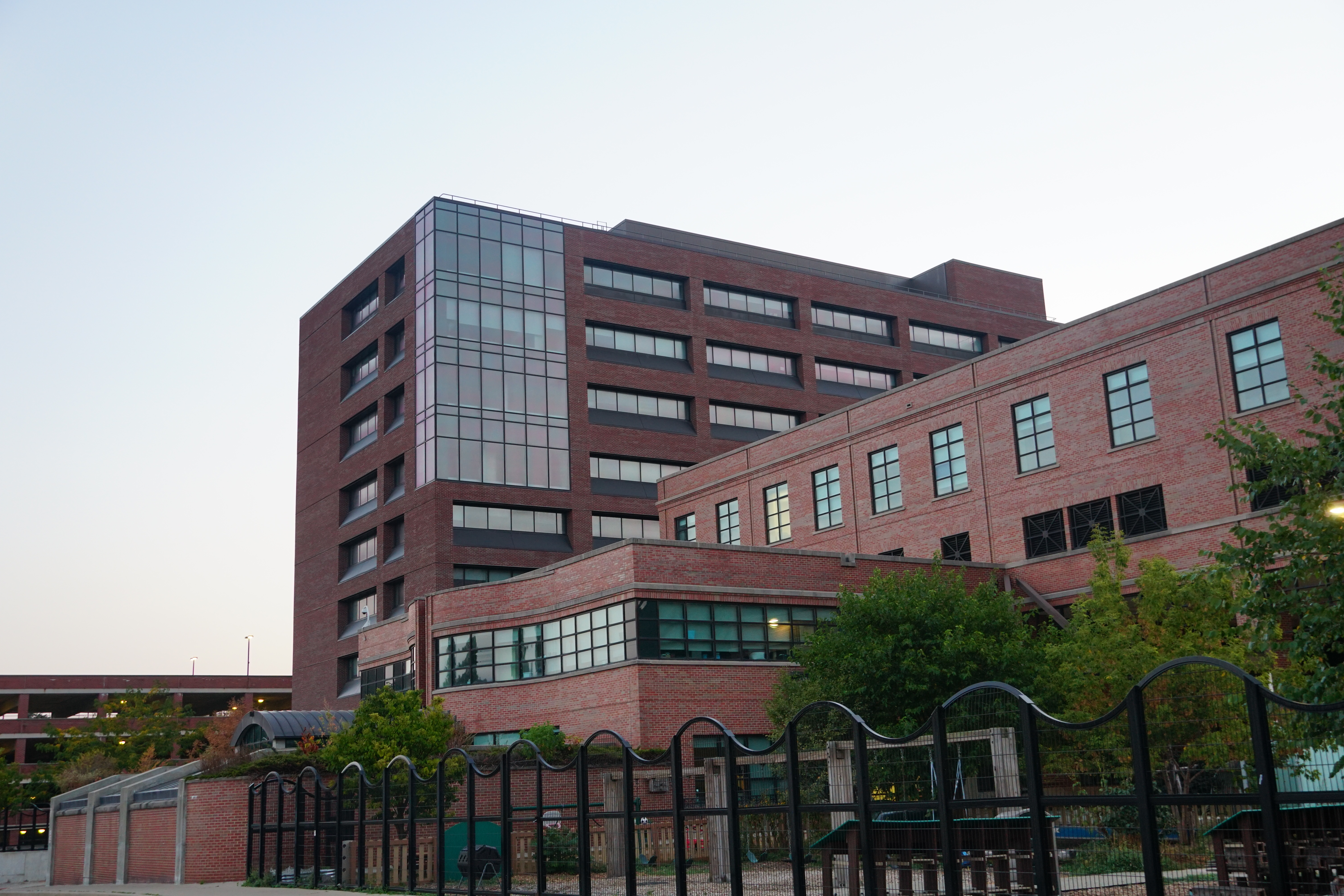
Northwest Quadrant

The former Columbia St. Mary's Hospital was acquired in 2010. It contains a seven-building complex, with over 820,000 square feet (76,000 m^{2}) and a parking structure, expanding the campus by 20 percent. Currently, the building houses the School of Information Studies, UWM's child care center, the Biological Sciences Greenhouse, and numerous departments' offices. The uses of the remaining portions of the complex are yet to be determined, although the university said in 2020 that it would raze Building A, the former Columbia Hospital building. The demolition began in spring 2022 after the covid-19 pandemic delayed the project. The former east wing is currently called Building A, west wing as Building B, Clinical Building as Building C, and the Medical Arts Building as Building D.

== Academics ==
Academic rankings

National
- Forbes: 431
- U.S. News & World Report: 315
- Washington Monthly: 256
- WSJ/College Pulse: 351

Global
- ARWU: 601-700
- QS: 1201-1400
- THE: 801-1000
- U.S. News & World Report: 713

The university consists of 15 colleges and schools, 70 academic centers, institutes and laboratory facilities and offers a total of 191 degree programs, including 94 bachelor's, 64 master's and 33 doctorate degrees. The School of Freshwater Sciences is the only graduate school of freshwater science in the U.S. and the third in the world. The Joseph J. Zilber School of Public Health is the first CEPH accredited dedicated school of public health in Wisconsin. The School of Architecture and Urban Planning, the College of Nursing and the College of Health Sciences are the largest in Wisconsin.

=== Libraries ===
Golda Meir Library is the university's main library. The 379,000 square foot library has more than 5.2 million cataloged items, many of which are available electronically through electronic reserve, web-based online catalog, searchable databases and indexes. The building was first constructed in 1967 and then expanded with the addition of the East Wing in 1974 and conference center in 1982. In 2007, Golda Meir Library Renovation Project was launched, which contributed to create the Daniel M. Soref Learning Commons, completed in 2009. This place, located on the first floor of West Wing, provides students learning spaces to study and work together. The library is named for Golda Meir, the fourth Prime Minister of Israel, who graduated in 1917 from the Milwaukee State Normal School, a predecessor institution of the University of Wisconsin–Milwaukee. The Golda Meir Library is also home to the American Geographical Society Library (AGSL), which "consists of nearly 2 million items including maps, atlases, globes, photographs, monographs, serials and digital geospatial data" according to the UWM Libraries website.

=== Honors College ===
The Honors College is an academic division that emphasizes personalized education to a selected group of undergraduate students. It is open to students in all majors and disciplines who meet and maintain the Honors College admission requirements. Students in the Honors College have a designated writing tutor, special advisors, private study space in the library and opportunities to engage in undergraduate research.

As of 2024 there were about 690 students enrolled in the Honors College, and about 60 students graduated with the Honors degree each year.

== Research ==
The university is classified among "R1: Doctoral Universities – Very high research activity". In the year 2015, the university had a total research expenditure of 68 million US Dollars and ranked 179th among US research universities by total research expenditure in 2010.

The UWM Research Foundation supports and commercializes the university's research and innovations. It provides intellectual property management, technology transfer, corporate sponsored research and strategic corporate partnership services to UWM researchers and industry corporations.

Research Growth Initiative (RGI) is a program designed to expand UWM's research enterprise through investment in projects with anticipated return on investment through extramural funding. The application process is competitive and rigorous. Proposals are evaluated by external reviewers with national reputations and ranked according to their quality, rewards and risk.

== Student life ==
=== Housing ===
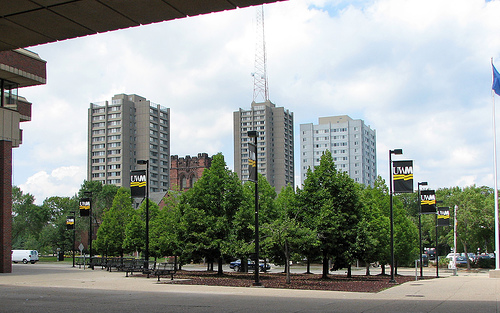
Sandburg Residence Halls

There are four university-managed student housing facilities: Cambridge Commons, Kenilworth Square Apartments, RiverView Residence Hall, and Sandburg Halls.

Sandburg Halls is the largest student residence hall on campus. It is a four-tower complex with a capacity of 2,700 students, arranged in three- and four-room suites. The North, South, and West towers were built in 1970, with the East tower opening in 2000. All East tower suites have full-size kitchens and a dining area. Sandburg Hall went through a renovation in the summer of 2008 with the installation of an environmentally friendly roof. Following a design by associate professor Jim Walsey, this change was intended to prevent overflows and backups into neighboring homes. Facilities inside the building include a cafeteria, fitness center, convenience store, coffee shop, computer lab and a second-run movie theater for residents. Sandburg Halls also has space for recreational activities, including grass space, a patio, basketball courts, and sand volleyball.

Kenilworth Square is located a mile south of the main campus and has a capacity of about 330 upper-class, graduate, and older students in one-, two-, and three-bedroom apartments in a converted Ford factory that also houses classrooms, galleries, and studios of the Peck School of the Arts.

RiverView Residence Hall, opened to first year students in 2008, is located several blocks west of Kenilworth Square and has a capacity of 470 students. There are a 24-hour University Housing shuttle, MCTS, and BOSS (Be On the Safe Side, the university shuttle service) running between the residence hall and the main campus. First year students can also attend some classes within the residence hall.

Cambridge Commons is the newest residence hall project, which opened in 2010 and houses 700 residents. Approximately 140 spaces are available for returning residents in apartment-style suites to include living rooms and kitchens. The remaining spaces are two-room suites with a shared bathroom and refrigerator. The lobby features a fireplace lounge, music practice rooms equipped with recording technology, and a computer lab. Cambridge is a LEED Gold certified building, with two green roofs, solar panels, and a green courtyard that reduces rain runoff using a 20,000 gallon holding tank.

All of housing with the exception of Kenilworth Square students are serviced by the Student Housing Administrative Council (SHAC) which is Milwaukee's version of a RHA and is student run.

In addition to these university-managed residence halls, students also occupy apartments and rental houses in the surrounding neighborhood. The Neighborhood Housing Office is available to help students seeking off-campus housing.

=== Media ===
The UWM Post is an online newspaper independently run by the students. Journalism students used to run Frontpage Milwaukee, another online newspaper. The UWM Journalism, Advertising and Media Studies department also publishes student work on Media Milwaukee, an online news publication.

Journalism & Mass Communication students used to run PantherVision, a weekly, news program distributed via the Higher Education Cable Consortium to approximately 300,000 households in southeastern Wisconsin.

The College of Letters and Science runs WUWM, a Milwaukee public radio station serving southeastern Wisconsin with news, public affairs and entertainment programming.

PantherU.com is a non-affiliated sports news media website that covers Milwaukee Panthers athletics in specific.

In October 2022, a student-run internet radio station was started on campus called Prowl Radio.

=== Student organizations ===
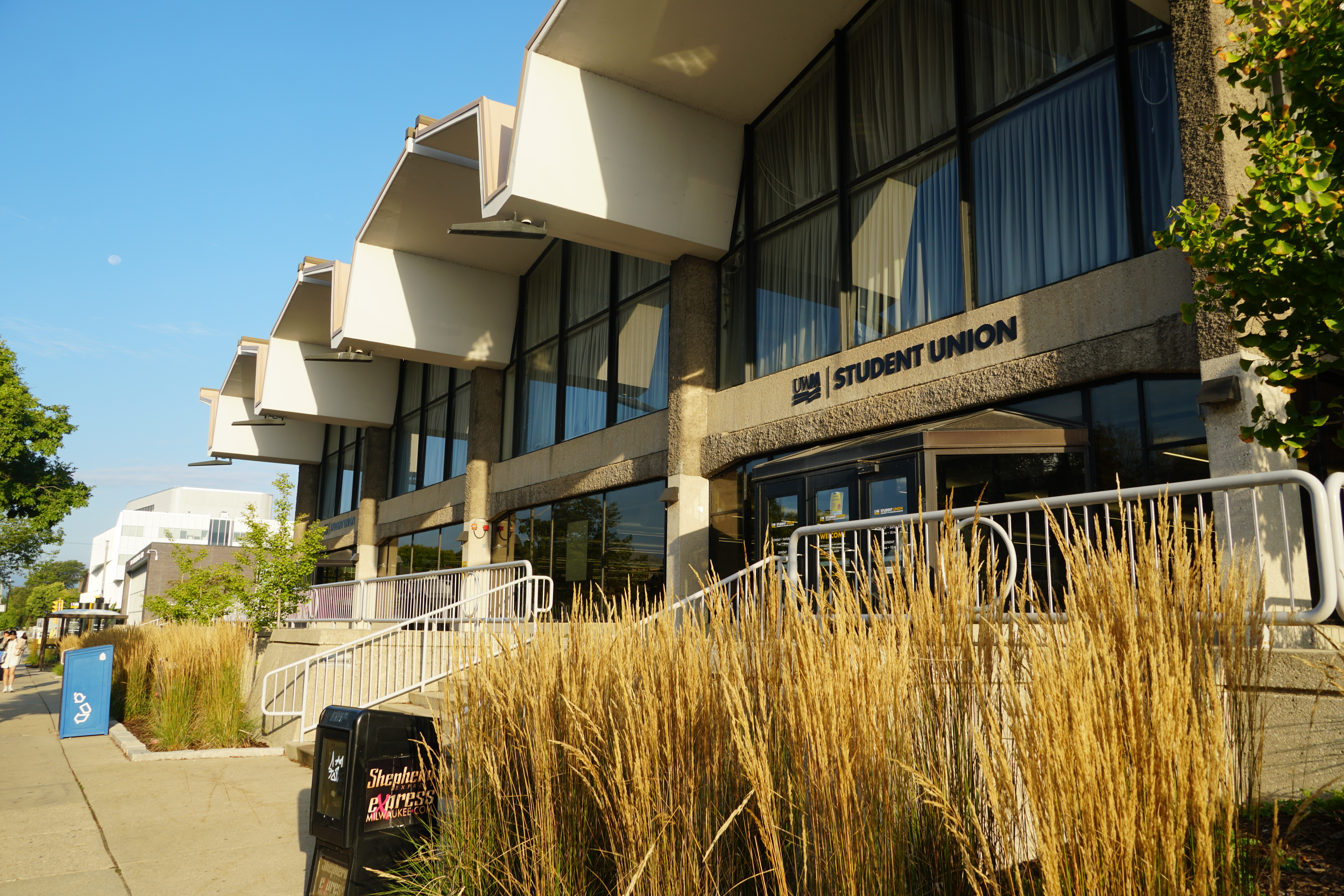
UW–Milwaukee Student Union

There are over 300 student organizations on campus. The governing body is the Student Association of UWM, which under Wisconsin's "shared governance" system (statute 36.09(5)) interacts with the university administration and the student body to insure students rights and interests. Other student organizations in the university vary greatly in nature, ranging from political (College Democrats, College Republicans), academic, cultural, to sports clubs.

UWM is home to a number of Greek organizations, including six IFC Council fraternities and three Panhellenic Council sororities, along with seven Multicultural Greek Council, and six National Pan-Hellenic Council organizations. The number of fraternity and sorority houses remains extremely limited due to Milwaukee's housing ordinance that restricts occupancy to no more than three unrelated individuals.

=== Panther Prowl ===
The Panther Prowl is an annual running race sponsored by the UWM Alumni Association. Participants race across the UWM campus and Upper Lake Park to raise funds for students scholarship and support alumni programming.

=== Performing arts venues ===
Four venues provide performance space for UWM's Peck School of the Arts including music, dance, theater and film. Musical performances are held in the Bader Concert Hall located in the Helene Zelazo Center for the Performing Arts or the Recital Hall adjacent to the Arts Center courtyard. Theatrical performances are held in the Mainstage Theater or Studio Theater located in the Theater Building next to Spaight Plaza. Dance performances are held in Mitchell Hall Dance Studio located on the second floor. The department of film recently opened a new venue to showcase new student films in Kenilworth Square.

=== Safety ===
In addition to an on-campus University Police Department staffed 24 hours a day, 365 days a year, with 43 full-time sworn police officers and 22 U-Park security officers, UWM provides a safety escort service called SAFE (Safety Awareness For Everyone), a shuttle van service called BOSS (Be On the Safe Side), and an emergency alert notification system. This service is funded through students segregated fees.

== Athletics ==
UWM has had three mascots and nicknames: Green Gulls (1910–1956), Cardinals (1956–1964) and Panthers (1964–present).

A total of 15 Panthers athletic teams compete at the NCAA level for Milwaukee in the ten-member Horizon League, which it joined for the 1994 season. Prior to moving to the Division I level for all NCAA sports in the 1990–91 season, the Panthers competed in Division I, Division II, Division III and the NAIA.

=== Men's Basketball ===
Under the tutelage of Bruce Pearl, the Panthers won their first ever Horizon League Tournament in 2003, leading to their first appearance in the NCAA Men's Division I Basketball Championship. They would return to the tournament in 2005 where they gained national attention when they defeated Boston College for a trip to the Sweet Sixteen. The Panthers pulled off one more upset in the 2006 NCAA Tournament over Oklahoma under new head coach Rob Jeter.

=== Football ===
Milwaukee disbanded its football program after the 1974 season, its 75th at the varsity level. Although it was considered a small program throughout its existence, it produced six players who went on to play in the National Football League including Houston Oilers All-Pro safety Mike Reinfeldt. Other notable Milwaukee football alums include Bill Carollo, the Panthers' starting quarterback from 1970 to 1973; and University of Illinois head coach Robert Zuppke.

In 2011, then-athletic director Rick Costello hired a consulting firm to look into the feasibility of reinstating football at the university.

Between 2003 and 2025, Milwaukee had a successful club football program. From 2003 to 2010, the club competed against the club football team from Marquette University in an annual tilt known as the Brew City Classic. The Panthers held onto the Golden Keg (the game's trophy) for the duration of the series, until Marquette disbanded its program in 2011. In 2012, the club team finished the season ranked No. 7 nationally by the Intercollegiate Club Football Federation. The club team was disbanded by the university in August 2026.

=== Other sports ===
The men's baseball and women's volleyball teams have enjoyed national success in recent years, with the baseball team posting six 30-win seasons in the last nine years and advancing to three NCAA Tournaments since 1999, including a win over top-ranked Rice University in the first round of the 1999 NCAA Tournament. The volleyball team has qualified for six of the last nine NCAA Tournaments and has compiled an all-time record of 867–477–7 through the end of the 2006 season.

The club bowling team has also seen success since its creation in 2000, winning the Wisconsin Collegiate Bowling Conference in 2011 and 2013 and finished 2011 as the 27th ranked team in the nation.

The men's club lacrosse team, founded in 2010, won the Great Lakes Lacrosse League Championship title in 2011 and 2015.

== Notable alumni and faculty ==
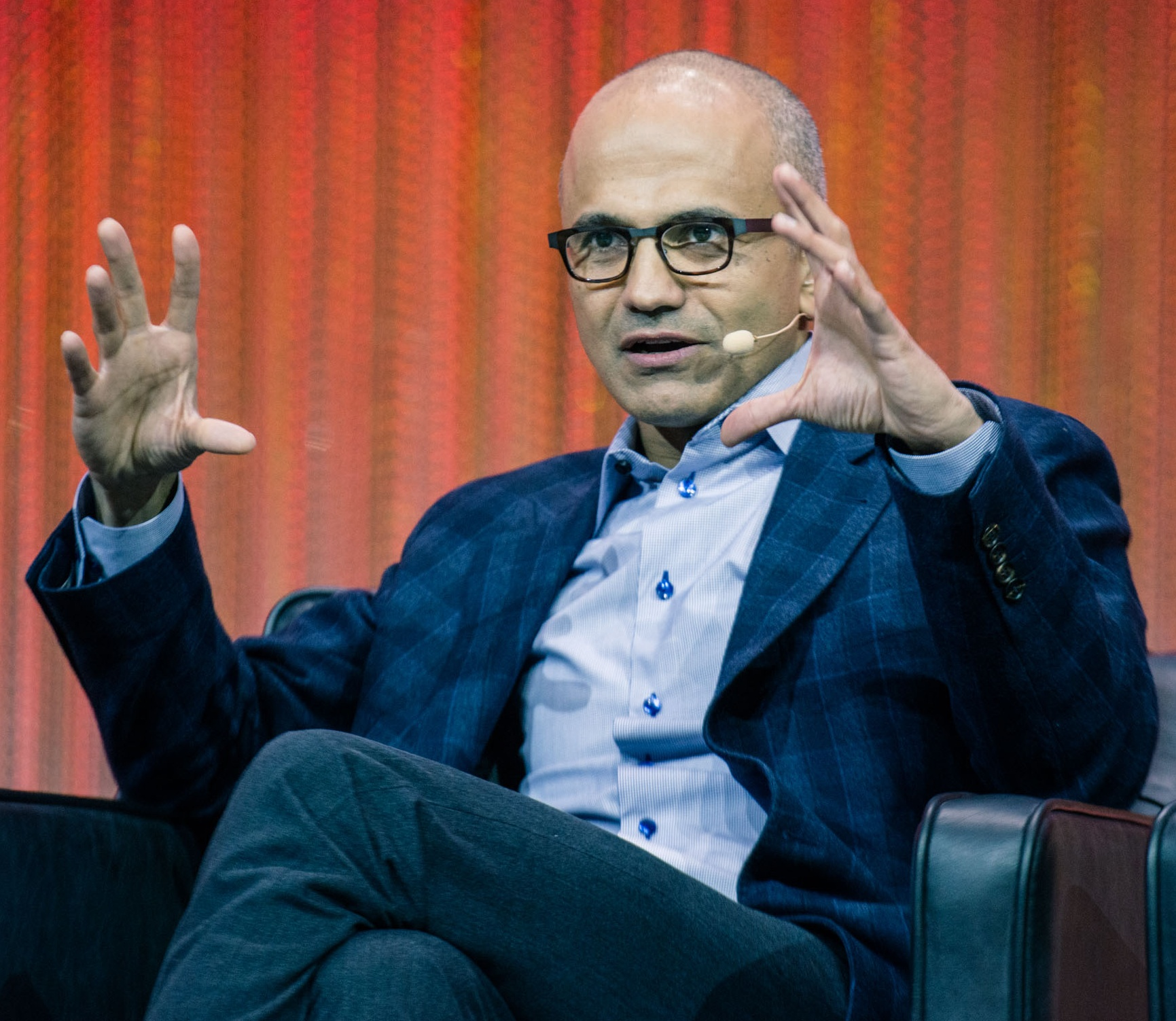
Satya Nadella, CEO of Microsoft Corporation

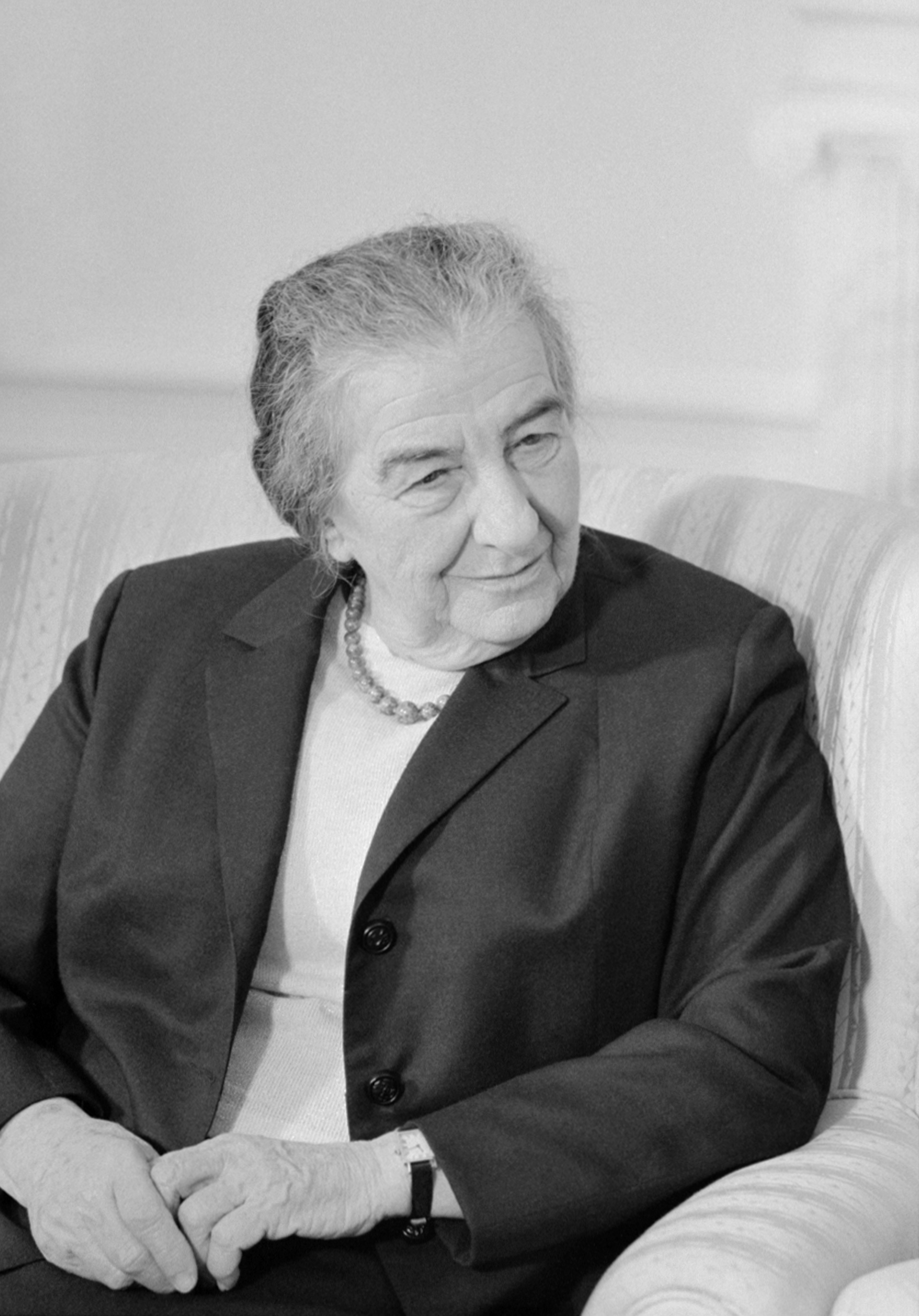
Golda Meir, the fourth Prime Minister of Israel

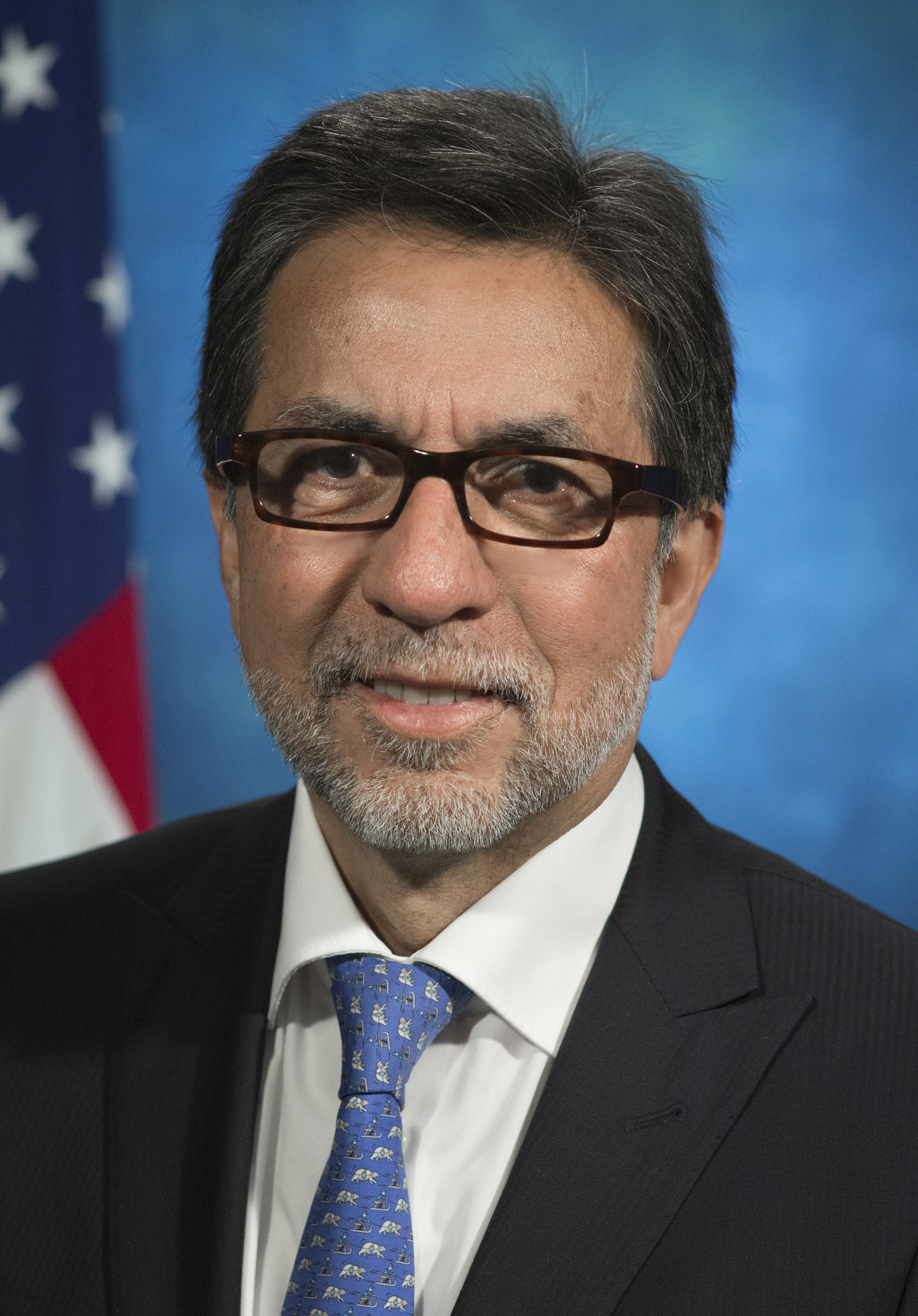
Luis E. Arreaga, United States Ambassador to Guatemala

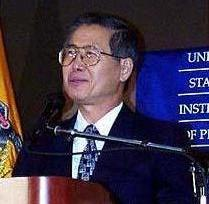
Alberto Fujimori, the 62nd President of Peru

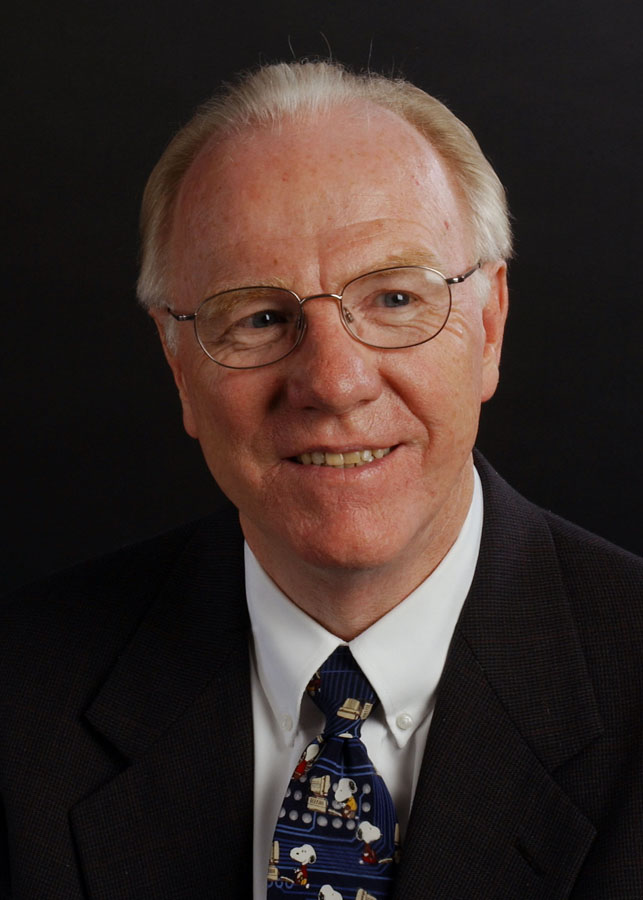
Larry N. Vanderhoef, chancellor of University of California, Davis

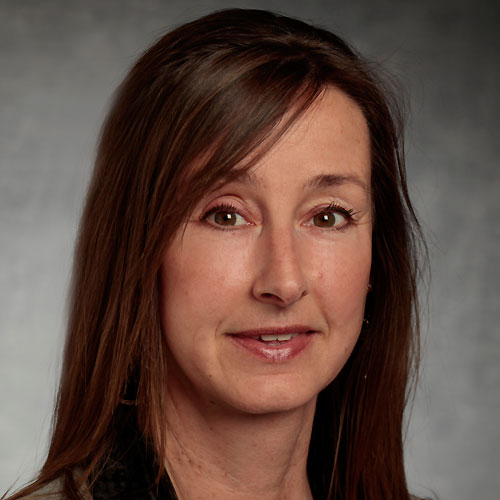
Raquel Rutledge, Pulitzer Prize-winning journalist

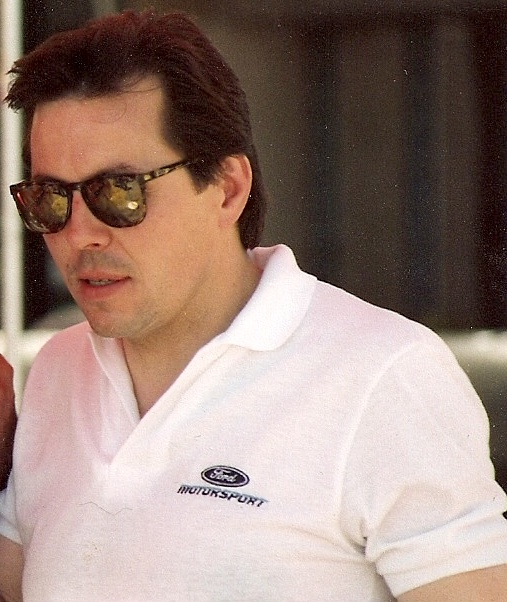
Alan Kulwicki, 1992 NASCAR Cup Series Champion

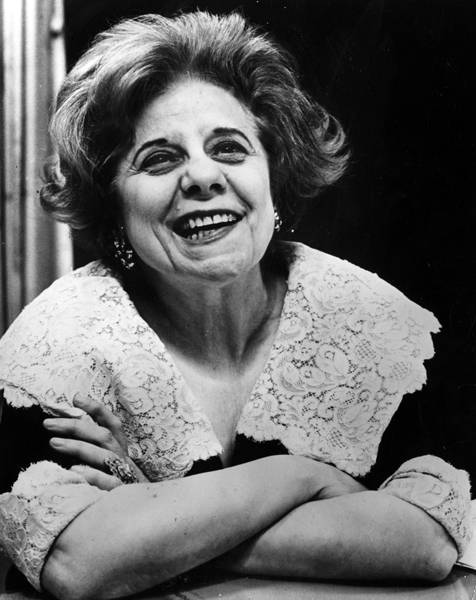
Dorothy Fuldheim, American journalist and anchor, "First Lady of Television News"

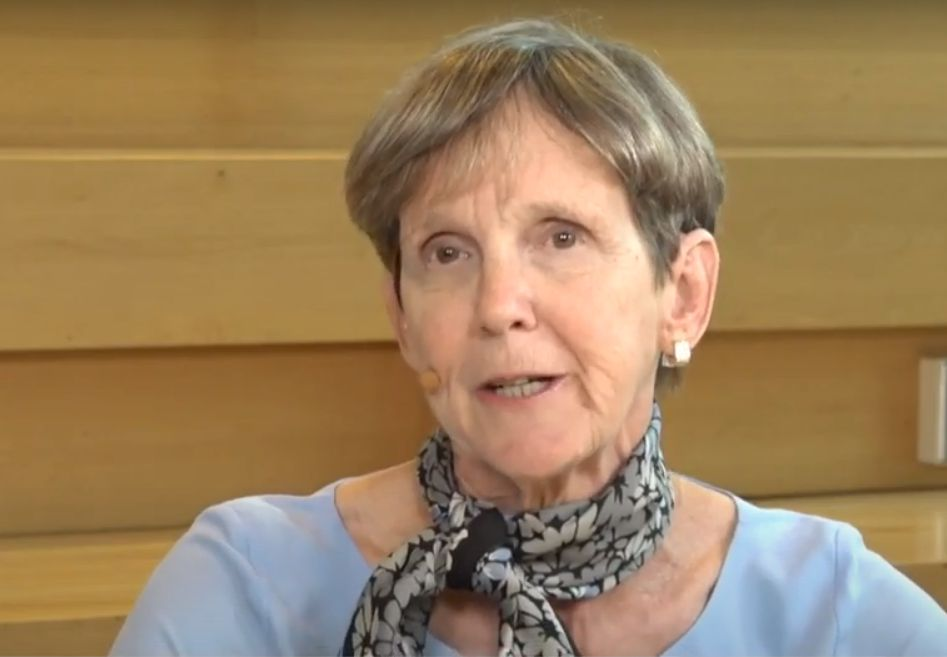
Jeanne W. Ross, Director of MIT Center for Information Systems Research, founding editor of MIS Quarterly Executive, AIS fellow

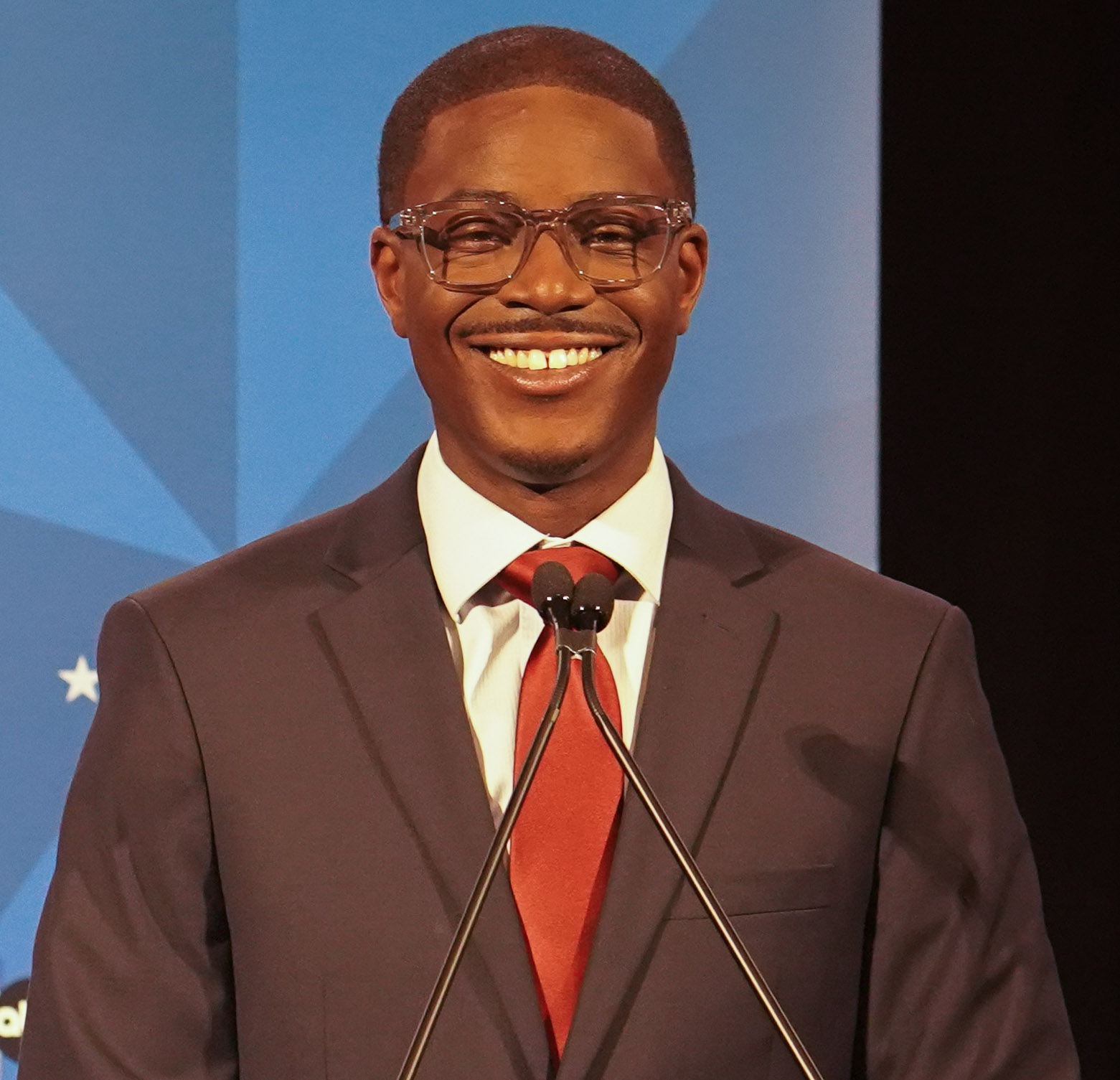
David Crowley, 47th governor of Wisconsin

== See also ==
- Great Lakes WATER Institute
- Einstein@Home
- Milwaukee Cup
- Lapham Memorial
- Jantar-Mantar
- Milwaukee
- Three Bronze Discs
