= Joseph J. Zilber School of Public Health =

Public health school of the University of Wisconsin–Milwaukee

Coordinates: 43°02′48.0″N 87°55′26.6″W

University of Wisconsin–Milwaukee School of Public Health
- Type: Public
- Established: 2009
- Dean: Ronald Perez (interim)
- Location: Milwaukee, Wisconsin, United States
- Campus: University of Wisconsin–Milwaukee
- Website: uwm.edu/publichealth/
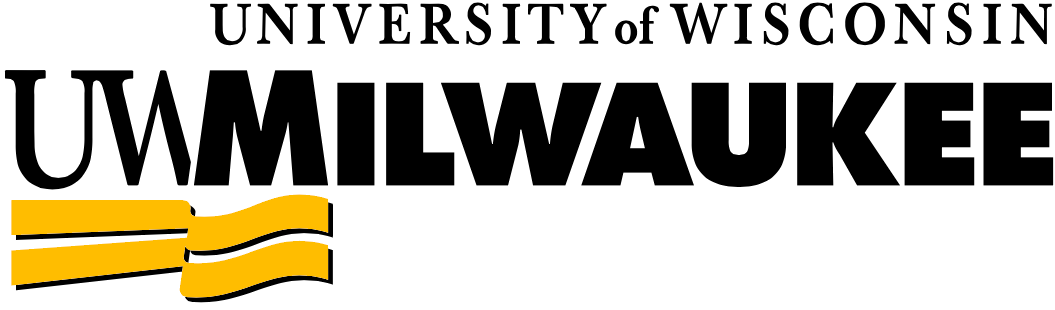

University of Wisconsin–Milwaukee School of Public Health is the public health school of University of Wisconsin–Milwaukee, located at downtown Milwaukee, WI. The school is one of the 58 public health schools accredited by Council on Education for Public Health (CEPH), and the first CEPH accredited dedicated school of public health in the State of Wisconsin. It is ranked as the 89th best public health school in the United States by U.S. News & World Report.

The school offers 4 doctoral, 5 master and 1 bachelor's degrees in public health. It is named after the Milwaukee philanthropist Joseph Zilber, who donated $10 million for the establishment of the school in 2009. The school has a close partnership with Milwaukee Health Department, which has offices on the second floor of the school building.

== History ==
The school was founded with State approval in 2009, with $10 million donation from a local philanthropist Joseph Zilber. The school was located in a building donated by Zilber at the former Pabst Brewery, near Aurora Sinai Medical Center.

The school started the accreditation process with the Council on Education for Public Health (CEPH) in 2013, and received national accreditation in 2017. It is the first CEPH accredited dedicated school of public health in Wisconsin. From 2013 and 2017, the school attracted more than $9.3 million federal research funding, the number of faculty increased to 27 and enrollment for the coming academic year stands at 87.

== Academics ==
=== Master ===
- MPH Biostatistics
- MPH Community & Behavioral Health Promotion
- MPH Environmental Health Sciences
- MPH Epidemiology
- MPH Public Health Policy and Administration
- MPH Nutrition & Dietetics

=== Doctoral ===
- PhD in Public Health:Biostatistics Concentration
- PhD in Public Health:Community & Behavioral Health Promotion Concentration
- PhD in Epidemiology
- PhD in Environmental Health Sciences

=== Bachelor ===
- Public Health
