= University of Wisconsin–Milwaukee Libraries =

Coordinates: 43.076871°N 87.880344°W

Golda Meir Library
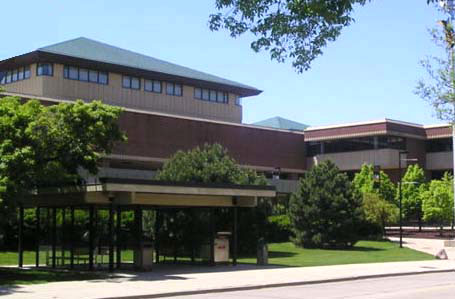
- Golda Meir Library seen from Hartford Avenue
- Established: 1967
- Location: Milwaukee, Wisconsin, United States
- Campus: University of Wisconsin–Milwaukee
- Website: http://www.uwm.edu/Library/

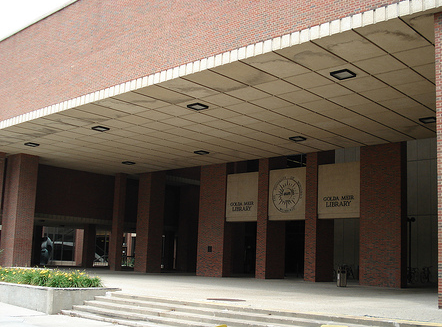
Entrance to the library

The Golda Meir Library, located in Milwaukee, Wisconsin, United States, is the main library of the University of Wisconsin–Milwaukee. The library has more than 4.5 million catalogued items, many of which are available electronically through Electronic Reserve, web-based online catalog, searchable databases and indices.

The building was first constructed in 1967 and then expanded with the addition of the East Wing in 1974 and conference center in 1987. The library was named for Golda Meir, the fourth prime minister of Israel, who graduated in 1917 from the Milwaukee State Normal School, an institution to which UWM traces its lineage.

== Collections ==
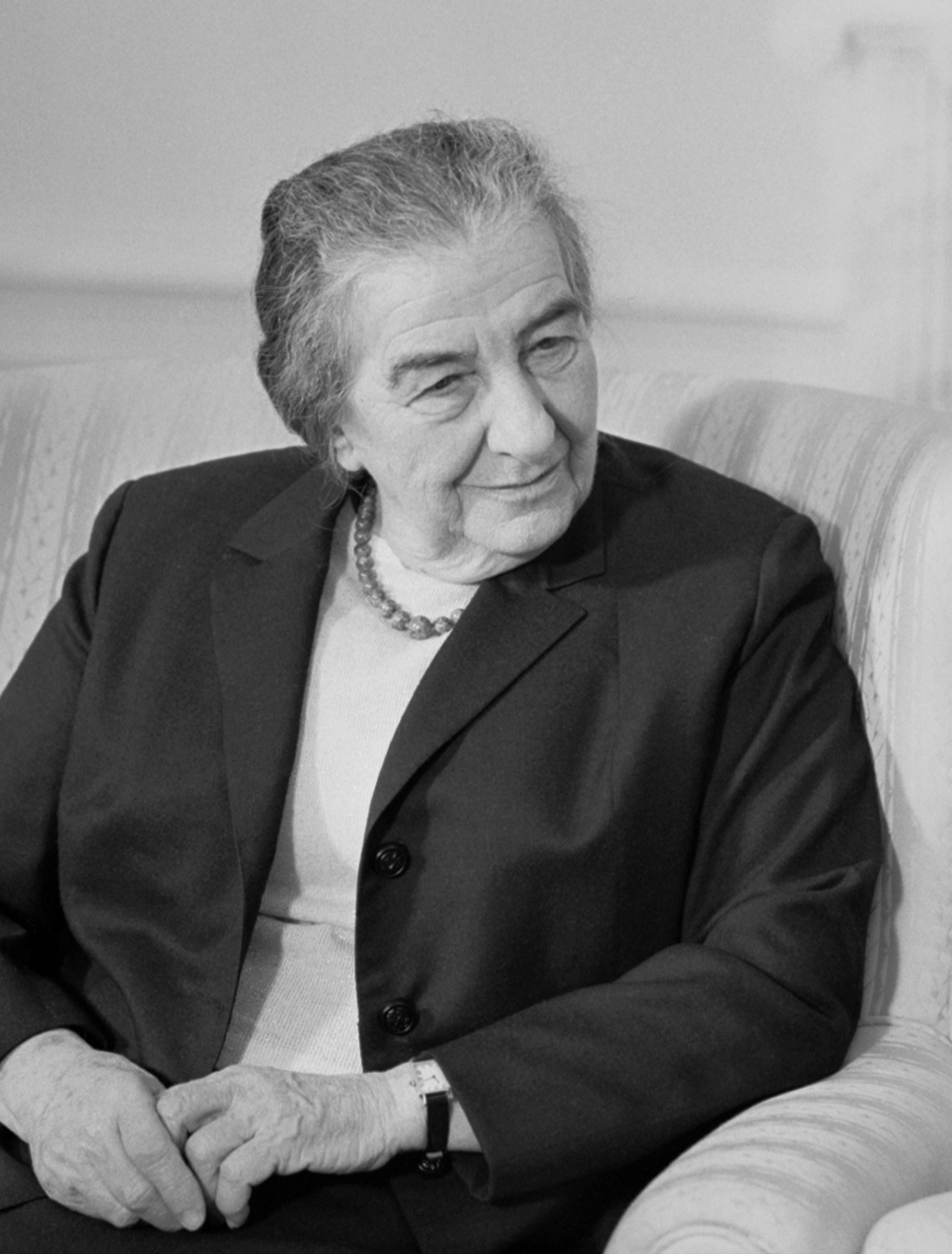
Golda Meir

The library's largest collection is the American Geographical Society Library (AGSL), the "foremost geography and map collections" in the US, which houses a vast number of historical and detailed maps, many rare and valuable books, research and technical reports, photographs, satellite images, digital data, and relevant serials.

Other special collections of the library include the Morris Fromkin Memorial Collection, Hebraica and Judaica Collection, the Slichter and Hohlweck Civil War Collections, the Frank and Mary Ermenc Slovenian music collection, the Harry and Dorothy Jagodzinski Franklin Delano Roosevelt Collection, the George Hardie Aerospace Collection, the Gerald Meyers classical music collection, the John Otis Collection on Wisconsin churches, the Seventeenth Century Research Collection, the Layton Art Library.

The University Archives consists of the Milwaukee Area Research Center, the UW–Milwaukee Manuscript Collection, and records of the university. The archives contains historical resources from Milwaukee and southeastern Wisconsin, including private papers from individuals, records from businesses and organizations as well as records from UW–Milwaukee.

== See also ==
- Three Bronze Discs
- Milwaukee
