= Ohio State Route 208 =

State highway in Muskingum County, Ohio, US

State Route 208

Route information
- Maintained by ODOT
- Length: 11.19 mi (18.01 km)
- Existed: 1924–present

Major junctions
- West end: SR 60 in Dresden
- East end: SR 93 in Adamsville

Location
- Country: United States
- State: Ohio
- Counties: Muskingum

Highway system
- Ohio State Highway System; Interstate; US; State; Scenic
| ← SR 207 | → SR 209 |

State Route 208 (SR 208, OH 208) is an east–west state highway in central Ohio, a U.S. state. The entire highway is in the northern portion of Muskingum County and is a two-lane highway, passing through woodlands. The western terminus of SR 208 is at SR 60 in Dresden, while its eastern terminus is at SR 93 in Adamsville. SR 208 was established in the mid 1920s.

== Route description ==
SR 208 begins at an intersection with SR 60 in Dresden. The road heads northeast into downtown Dresden. In downtown, the highway turns southeasterly and passes through residential properties, as a two-lane highway. The route leaves downtown Dresden, by turning towards the northeast. Here, SR 208 has its highest traffic counts; within the 2011 ODOT survey, the road is listed with an average annual daily traffic(AADT) of 3,090 vehicles on a section of highway between the western terminus and the point that SR 208 turns northeasterly. After turning towards the northeast the road crosses the Ohio Central Railroad owned track. The highway passes through commercial and a school. After the school, the road crosses the Muskingum River, followed by a T-intersection with SR 666. The highway has a T-intersection with SR 666, SR 208 heads easterly, from SR 666, passing through woodland and farmland.

East of the intersection with SR 666, the AADT of SR 208 drops to 780 vehicles. At Stone Church Road, the highway heads towards the south-southeast. The road has an intersection at Township Road 115 (T–115), at this intersection SR 208 turns easterly. The highway makes a sharp curve, turning towards the south. After turning towards the south, the road makes a curve towards due east. The makes one last sharp turn, turning towards the south. The route enters Adamsville from the north, heading due south. The road passes through residential properties. SR 208's eastern terminus is at an intersection with SR 93, at the main intersection in the village. No portion that is included as a part of the National Highway System.

== History ==
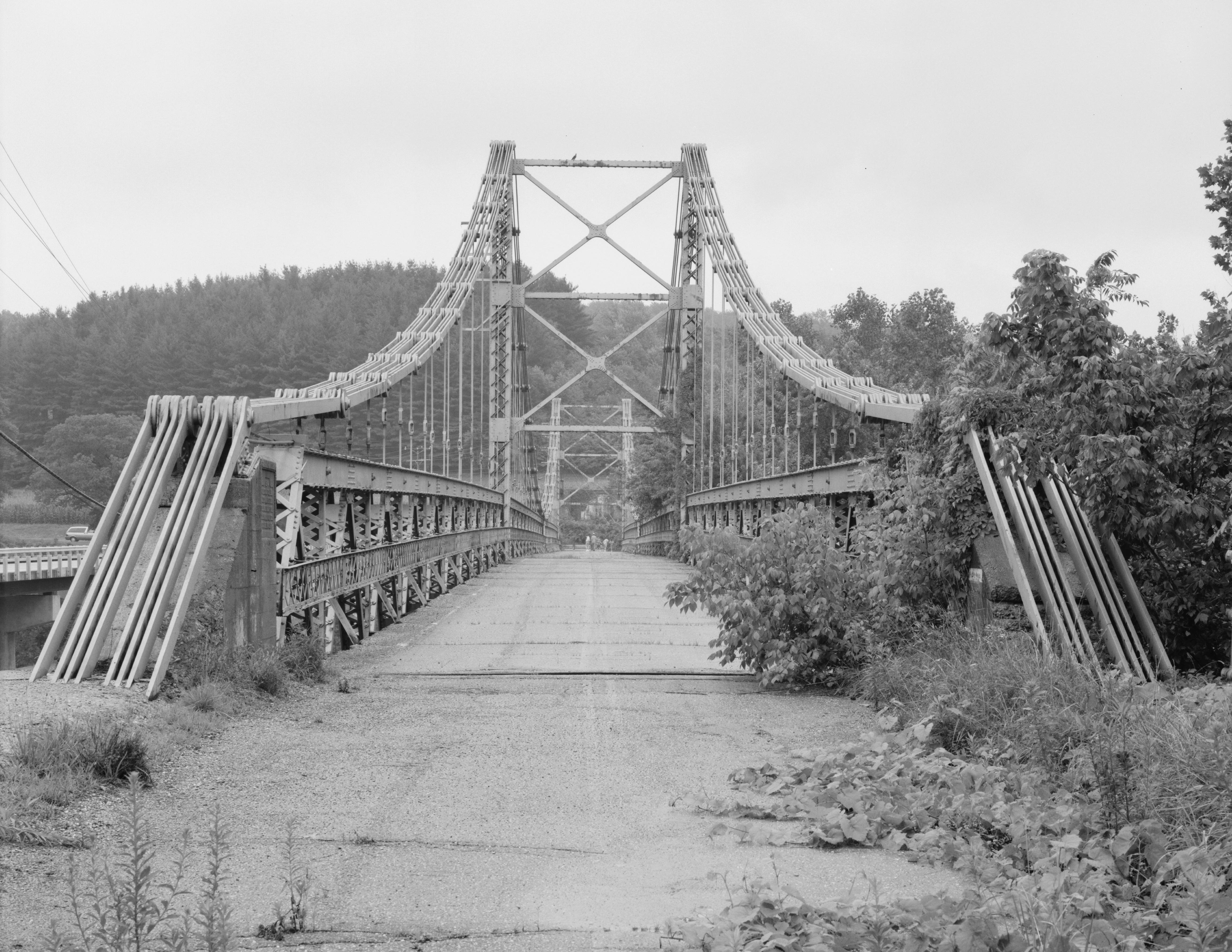
The historic Dresden Suspension Bridge once carried SR 208 over the Muskingum River.

Designated during the early years of the Ohio State Highway system, specifically in 1924, State Route 208 maintains the same Dresden-to-Adamsville routing today that it did when it debuted. No significant changes have taken place to the highway itself since its inception, only the designation of the highways at its endpoints. What is now State Route 60 at State Route 208's western terminus was known as State Route 77 in 1924, and what is now State Route 93 at the eastern terminus of State Route 208 was originally designated as State Route 75. The entire route was paved in 1950.

== Major intersections ==
The entire route is in Muskingum County.

| Location | mi | km | Destinations | Notes |
|---|---|---|---|---|
| Dresden | 0.00 | 0.00 | SR 60 (Frazeysburg Road) / West 9th Street | |
| Madison Township | 1.03 | 1.66 | SR 666 south (North River Road) | Northern terminus of SR 666 |
| Adamsville | 11.19 | 18.01 | SR 93 | |
1.000 mi = 1.609 km; 1.000 km = 0.621 mi
