= George W. Adams House =

Historic house in Ohio, United States

- U.S. National Register of Historic Places
- Location within Ohio Location within the United States
- Nearest city: Trinway, Ohio
- Coordinates: 40°7′54″N 82°0′57″W
- Built: 1842
- Architectural style: Greek Revival
- NRHP reference No.: 79001912
- Added to NRHP: 1979-11-29

George W. Adams House was a registered historic building near Trinway, Ohio, United States, listed in the National Register on November 29, 1979. A housing development now sits in its place.

Just north of Dresden, the house was built around the 1840s for George Willison Adams, one of the most prominent landowners in Muskingum County. It was located near Adams' mill which has since been razed. The house served as Adams' place of residence until 1856, when he built the more ornate Prospect Place, also an NRHP-listed property in the area. The house was also considered significant for its Greek Revival architectural style.

== See also ==
- Prospect Place
