= Adam Bice =

American football player (born 1989)

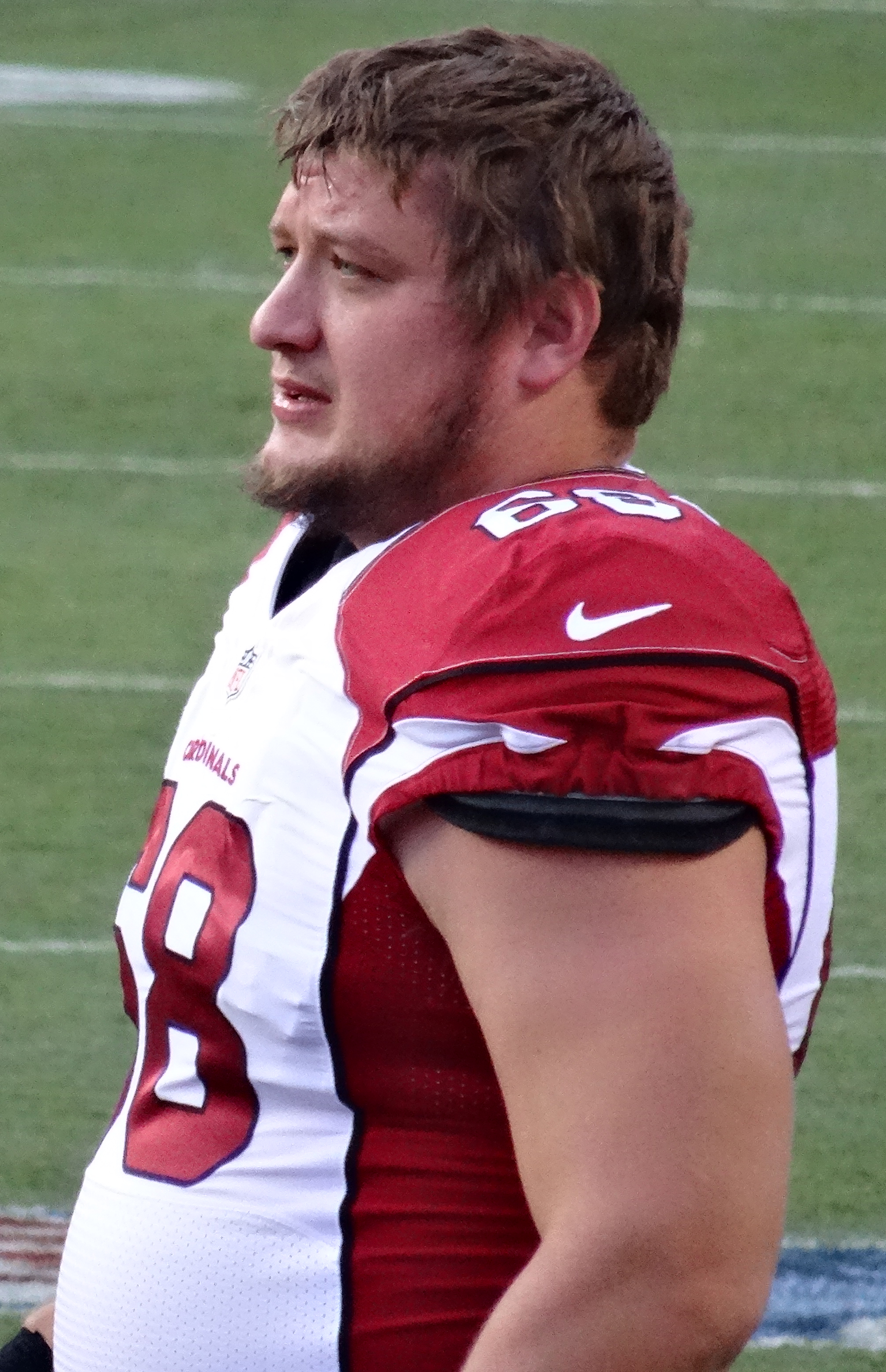
- Bice with the Arziona Cardinals in 2013

No. 55, 68
- Position: Center

Personal information
- Born: June 30, 1989 (age 37)
- Listed height: 6 ft 4 in (1.93 m)
- Listed weight: 315 lb (143 kg)

Career information
- High school: Tri-Valley (OH)
- College: Akron
- NFL draft: 2013: undrafted

Career history
- Arizona Cardinals (2013)*; Cleveland Gladiators (2017)
- * Offseason or practice squad member only
- Stats at ArenaFan.com

Adam Bice (born June 30, 1989) is an American former professional football center. He played college football for the University of Akron. He went undrafted during the 2013 NFL draft, and signed as an undrafted free agent with the Arizona Cardinals. He was also a member of the Cleveland Gladiators of the Arena Football League (AFL).

== Early life ==
Bice is from Dresden, Ohio, where he attended Tri-Valley High School and played for the football team.

== College career ==
Bice enrolled in the University of Akron, where he played for the Akron Zips football team from 2008 to 2012.

== Professional career ==
After going undrafted during the 2013 NFL draft, Bice signed with the Arizona Cardinals as an undrafted free agent. On May 18, 2017, Bice was assigned to the Cleveland Gladiators.
