= Larry Vickers =

Larry Vickers may refer to:

- Larry Vickers (soldier)
- Larry Vickers (basketball)

== See also ==
- Lawrence Vickers, American football player
