= Wakatomika =

Wakatomika was the name of two 18th century Shawnee villages in what is now the U.S. state of Ohio. The name was also spelled Wapatomica, Waketomika, Waketomica, and Waketameki, among other variations, but the similar name Wapakoneta was a different Shawnee village. Both Wakatomikas were destroyed in raids, the first by colonial Virginians in 1774, the second by Kentuckians in 1786.

== Wakatomika 1 ==
The first Wakatomika was located along the Muskingum River, near present-day Dresden, Ohio, and was close to a number of Lenape towns. It was established around 1756 by Shawnees from Upper Shawneetown, which was located along the Ohio River. After the outbreak of the French and Indian War in 1754, the Shawnees were distancing themselves from raids by the colony of Virginia. For the same reason, in 1758 the Shawnee residents of Lower Shawneetown, also on the Ohio River, moved fifty miles upriver and established new towns on the Pickaway Plains, near modern Circleville, Ohio. In August 1774, during Dunmore's War, Wakatomika and four other Shawnee villages on the Muskingum were destroyed by Virginia colonial militia in an expedition led by Angus McDonald.

== Wakatomika 2 ==
After the destruction of the first Wakatomika in Dunmore's War, the residents of Wakatomika resettled further west, establishing a new Wakatomica by 1778 on the Mad River, two miles south of present Zanesfield, Ohio. This town, along with other nearby Shawnee towns, were destroyed in 1786 during an expedition led by Benjamin Logan at the outset of the Northwest Indian War.

== Legacy ==
The second Wakatomika is commemorated by two historical markers. The first was erected in 1930 by the Ohio Revolutionary Memorial Commission. The second was erected in 2010 by the Eastern Shawnee Tribe of Oklahoma and the Ohio Historical Society.

"Wakatomika" continues to be used for a number of place names, including:

- Wakatomika, Ohio, an unincorporated community
- Wakatomika Creek
- Little Wakatomika Creek
- Camp Wakatomika, a Girl Scout camp in Licking County, Ohio
