= Tri-Valley Local School District =

School district in Ohio, United States

Address
- 36 East Muskingum Avenue Dresden, Ohio Dresden, Ohio, 43821; United States
- Coordinates: 40°9′11.244″N 82°0′21.8232″W

District information
- Type: Public
- Grades: PreK–12
- Established: 1966
- President: Scott Ford
- Superintendent: Mr. Mark Neal
- Schools: 6
- NCES District ID: 3904887

Students and staff
- Students: 2,785 (2025–2026)
- Teachers: 138.65 (on an FTE basis) (2025–2026)
- Staff: 221.01 (on an FTE basis) (2025–2026)
- Student–teacher ratio: 20.09 (2025–2026)
- Athletic conference: OHSAA

Other information
- Website: www.tvschools.org

The Tri-Valley Local School District, or Tri-Valley Schools, is a public school district located in northwest and north central Muskingum County, Ohio.

The school district was formed in 1966 through the merger of schools in Frazeysburg, Nashport, Dresden and Adamsville. Tri-Valley High School specifically was formed through the merger of Jefferson High School in Dresden, Frazeysburg-Nashport High School in Frazeysburg, and Adamsville High School in Adamsville. The district administrative center is located in Dresden, Ohio, and the current superintendent is Mr. Neal

High school sports teams are known as the Scotties, and the middle school sports teams are also known as the Scotties.

== Board of education ==
Tri-Valley Local School District is governed by board consisting of 5 members. 3 elected the year before a presidential election and 2 the year after the presidential election.

School Board Members
Susie Cameron
Andrea Collet
Luke Davis
Scott Ford
Scott Welker

https://www.tri-valley.k12.oh.us/districtBoardEd.aspx

== Schools in the Tri-Valley Local School District ==
- Tri-Valley High School (Dresden)
- Tri-Valley Middle School (Dresden)
- Dresden Elementary School (Dresden)
- Frazeysburg Elementary School (Frazeysburg)
- Nashport Elementary School (Nashport)
- Adamsville Elementary School (Adamsville)

== Elementary schools ==
=== Jefferson ===
Jefferson Elementary School is located in Dresden. It was built in the early 1940s as a K-4 school and was demolished in September 2006 to make way for a newer K-6 school facility. Jefferson Elementary was later replaced by Dresden Elementary school.

== Towns, villages, and populated places located in Tri-Valley Local School District ==
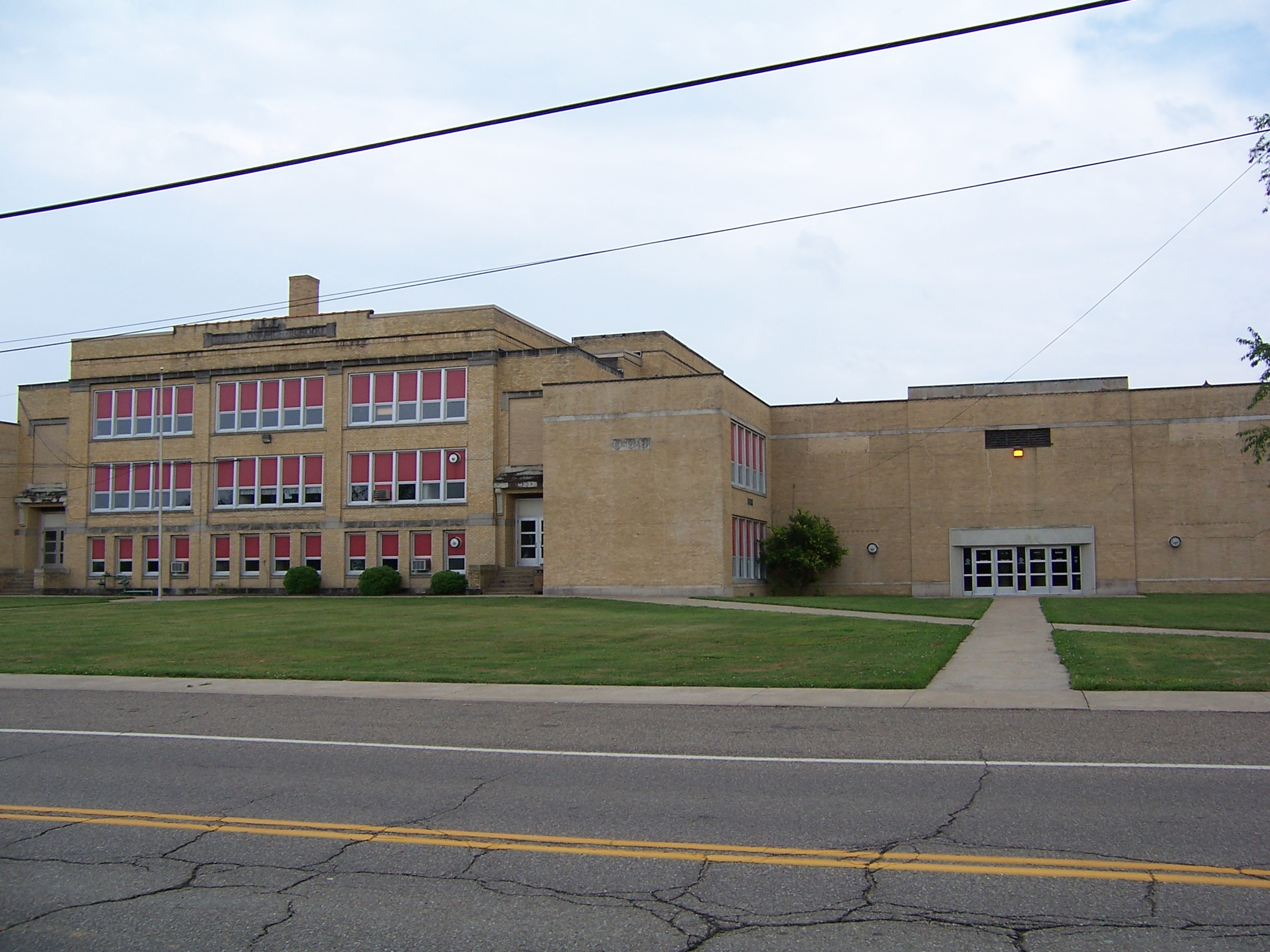
The former Tri-Valley Middle School

- Black Run
- Adamsville
- Dresden
- Frazeysburg
- Nashport
- Trinway
- Adams Mills

Also, some students with Zanesville addresses but living north of the city limits of Zanesville attend schools in Tri-Valley, as well as some students living in the southernmost parts of western Coshocton County.
