= Ohio State Route 666 =

State highway in Muskingum County, Ohio, US

State Route 666

Route information
- Maintained by ODOT
- Length: 14.17 mi (22.80 km)
- Existed: 1937–present

Major junctions
- South end: SR 60 / SR 146 in Zanesville
- North end: SR 208 near Dresden

Location
- Country: United States
- State: Ohio
- Counties: Muskingum

Highway system
- Ohio State Highway System; Interstate; US; State; Scenic
← SR 665	→ SR 668

State Route 666 (SR 666) is a 14.17-mile (22.80 km) state route that runs between Zanesville and Dresden in the US state of Ohio. Most of the route is a rural two-lane highway and passes through both woodland and farmland. For much of its path, SR 666 runs generally parallel to the east of the Muskingum River. The highway was first signed in 1937 on the same alignment as today. The whole highway was paved by 1955.

== Route description ==
SR 666 begins at a traffic signal with SR 60 and SR 146, on the northeast side of Zanesville. The route heads east as a two-lane highway, before curving northeast. While passing through Zanesville the route passes woodland, with some commercial businesses. The highway makes a sharp curve due west, before another sharp curve northeast. After the second curve the route leaves Zanesville, running parallel to the Muskingum River and an Ohio Central Railroad track. The road makes a sharp curve northwest and passes through a one-lane 10'11"-clearance underpass under the Ohio Central Railroad track. After passing under the railroad track the route curves north-northeast and the railroad track curves due east. The roadway passes through the Zanesville State Forest Nursery, followed by a curve northwest, passing through the state forest nursery again. After leaving the state forest nursery, the highway passes through farmland heading due north. The route curves northeast passing through the state forest nursery for the last time and the highway has an intersection with County Road 40 (CR 40), in rural Jefferson Township. Following this intersection, SR 666 turns due west, before curving towards the north. This section of roadway passes mostly through farmland, with wooded areas when the route is close to the river. SR 666 ends at an intersection with SR 208 near Dresden, on the east bank of the Muskingum River.

SR 666 is not part of the National Highway System, a system of routes important to the nation's economy, mobility and defense. The highway is maintained by the Ohio Department of Transportation (ODOT). ODOT's 2010 annual average daily traffic (AADT) calculations showed that the lowest traffic levels were present on the section that is at the intersection with Washington Township Road 112 (Bateman Road), where only 510 vehicles used the highway daily; the peak traffic volume was 5,340 vehicles AADT along a section of SR 666 near its southern terminus.

== History ==
SR 666 was established in 1937 along the same alignment between Zanesville and near Dresden within Muskingum County that it utilizes today. Between 1953 and 1955 the highway was paved. The highway has not experienced any major changes to its routing since 1955.

== Major intersections ==
The entire route is in Muskingum County.

Location	mi	km	Destinations	Notes
Zanesville	0.00	0.00	SR 60 / SR 146 to I-70	Southern terminus of SR 666
Madison Township	14.17	22.80	SR 208	Northern terminus of SR 666
1.000 mi = 1.609 km; 1.000 km = 0.621 mi
