= Francis John McConnell =

American bishop (1871–1953)

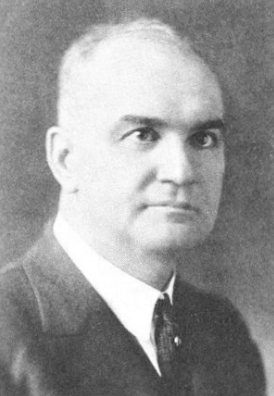
- Born: August 18, 1871; Trinway, Ohio, US
- Died: August 18, 1953 (aged 82); Lucasville, Ohio, US
- Education: Ohio Wesleyan University; Boston University School of Theology
- Occupations: Clergyman, writer
- Spouse: Eva H. Thomas (m. 1897)

Francis John McConnell (August 18, 1871 – August 18, 1953) was an American social reformer and a bishop in the Methodist Episcopal Church, elected in 1912.

== Biography ==
Francis John McConnell was born in Trinway, Ohio on August 18, 1871. He married Eva H. Thomas on March 11, 1897.

McConnell was a graduate of the Ohio Wesleyan University and the Boston University School of Theology. He was an ordained minister in the Methodist Episcopal Church for many years, serving among other places a large church in Brooklyn, New York.

Before election to the episcopacy, McConnell served as the president of DePauw University, Greencastle, Indiana, 1909–1912. During his presidency he led the university's first major fund drive, the Campaign for the Seventy-Fifth Anniversary Fund, which produced a total subscription of $550,546.

Francis John McConnell was a major second-generation advocate of Boston personalism who sought to apply the philosophy to social problems of his time.

He died on August 18, 1953, at his summer home in Lucasville, Ohio.

McConnell is best known for his quote "We need a type of patriotism that recognizes the virtues of those who are opposed to us".

== Publications ==
- The Diviner Immanence (1910)
- Religious Certainty (1910)
- The Increase of Faith: Some Present-day Aids to Belief (1912)
- Personal Christianity, Instruments and Ends in the Kingdom of God (1914)
- Understanding the Scriptures (1917)
- Public Opinion and Theology (1920)
- Mcconnell, Bishop Francis; Report On The Steel Strike Of 1919 Online
- McConnell, Bishop Francis John, "The Christlike God", A survey of the Divine Attributes from the Christian Point of View, copyright 1927 by the author, first edition printed March 1927, The Abingdon Press, New York and Cincinnati.

== See also ==
- List of bishops of the United Methodist Church
