= Ghost Brothers =

American television series

- Genre: Paranormal; Reality TV
- Starring: Dalen Spratt; Juwan Mass; Marcus Harvey
- Country of origin: United States
- Original language: English
- No. of seasons: 2
- No. of episodes: 20 (incl. specials)

Production
- Executive producers: Craig Piligian; Danny Passman; Fay Yu; Mike Nichols
- Camera setup: Multi-camera setup
- Running time: 43 minutes
- Production companies: Pilgrim Media Group; Crybaby Media

Original release
- Network: Destination America; TLC (season 2)
- Release: April 15, 2016 – May 12, 2017

Ghost Brothers is an American television series about the paranormal that premiered on April 15, 2016 on Destination America, which is part of Discovery Communications. Produced by Pilgrim Media Group in association with Crybaby Media, the program follows ghost hunters Dalen Spratt, Juwan Mass, and Marcus Harvey as they investigate locations around the United States that are reported to be haunted. The team is officially led by Spratt, with Mass and Harvey providing assistance and technical support. Season 2 aired on March 10, 2017 on TLC.

On July 17, 2019, it was announced that a spin-off series titled, Ghost Brothers: Haunted Houseguests, would premiere on August 16, 2019 on Travel Channel.

== Premise ==
Based out of their hometown of Atlanta, Georgia, the Ghost Brothers are an all African-American group of ghost hunters who investigate the most haunted locations in America in an attempt to prove that ghosts are real. Before every investigation, their tagline is, "It's time to pop the trunk on these ghosts!", meaning open the door to their SUV's trunk where all their ghost hunting equipment is located. They also like to say, "Let's go ghosting!", and sing, "Ghost Brothers, ghosting out." when they roll out after their investigation is finished.

Opening Introduction:

There's a new team of paranormal investigators here to answer two questions about ghost hunting. Are ghosts for real? And why is everybody white?

I'm Dalen, the leader of the group. We're three best friends who all had paranormal experiences as kids. Now that we're grown, we're not afraid to look for answers. I'm Juwan, and I'm a Ghost Brother. My name is Marcus, and I'm a Ghost Brother. Our mission is to hit the most haunted locations in America to prove that ghosts are for real.

We are... the Ghost Brothers.

== Cast and crew ==
- Dalen Spratt – Leader, paranormal investigator, fashion designer
- Juwan Mass – paranormal investigator, fashion designer
- Marcus Harvey – paranormal investigator, full-time barber

== Series overview ==
Season	Episodes	Originally released		
Season	Episodes	First released	Last released	Network
1	6	October 26, 2016	November 2, 2016	Destination America & TLC
2	6	April 15, 2016	May 20, 2016	Destination America
3	8	March 10, 2017	May 12, 2017	TLC

== Specials ==
Note: * These Ghostin' Edition specials re-aired on TLC after the first-run season 2 episodes.

No.	Title	Location	Original release date	U.S. viewers (millions)
1	"Ghostin' Edition: Magnolia Plantation"	Derry, Louisiana	October 26, 2016	N/A
In this special "Ghostin' Edition", the Ghost Brothers share previously un-aired bonus footage they filmed during their ghostin' time at Magnolia Plantation, including investigation updates they captured from the home.
2	"Ghostin' Edition: Prospect Place"	Trinway, Ohio	October 26, 2016	N/A
This Ghostin' Edition features new bonus footage from the brothers investigation at the highly haunted Prospect Place in Trinway, Ohio.
3	"Ghostin' Edition: The Allen House"	Monticello, Arkansas	October 26, 2016	N/A
This Ghostin' Edition includes previously un-aired footage and new updates during the brothers time at the Arkansas' haunted Allen House.
4	"Ghostin' Edition: Magnolia Hotel"	Seguin, Texas	November 2, 2016	N/A
The brothers spend their ghostin' time at Texas' Magnolia Hotel, where they reveal bonus footage and new evidence.
5	"Ghostin' Edition: The Delta Queen"	Houma, Louisiana	November 2, 2016	N/A
Previously unaired bonus footage and new investigation updates are featured in this Ghostin' Edition of the brothers on board The Delta Queen, docked in Louisiana.
6	"Ghostin' Edition: The Fitzpatrick Hotel"	Washington, Georgia	November 2, 2016	N/A
In this Ghostin' Edition, the brothers share new evidence during their investigation at the haunted Fitzpatrick Hotel in their home state of Georgia.

== Episodes ==
=== Season 1 (2016) ===
No.	Title	Location	Original release date	U.S. viewers (millions)
1.1	"Magnolia Plantation"	Derry, Louisiana	April 15, 2016	0.458
The Ghost Brothers head to Derry, Louisiana to investigate the Magnolia Plantation, which dates back to the early 1800s that was a former cotton plantation with slave labor. They want to prove that deceased overseer Mr. Miller, who was shot by union troops, is still angrily roaming the property, and conjurer Aunt Agnes, who was a slave here until she died in the 1920s, is still practicing voodoo in the afterlife.
1.2	"The Allen House"	Monticello, Arkansas	April 22, 2016	0.456
The brothers travel to Monticello, Arkansas to investigate the Allen House, which has claims of the current owner's doppelgangers, and the ghost of the original owner's middle daughter, LaDell, who was in love with a married man. After he left her, she committed suicide by drinking poison in her bedroom on Christmas night in 1948. In order to prove if the Allen family’s apparitions are here, they set up a casket while in the dining room, which was used for funerals.
1.3	"Prospect Place"	Trinway, Ohio	April 29, 2016	0.443
The brothers head up north to Trinway, Ohio to investigate Prospect Place, a 29-room mansion built in 1856 as a stop on the Underground Railroad. They learn the legend of a bounty hunter who was captured and then hanged in the barn by ranch hands after he demanded the owner give up his runaway slaves. It is said his aggressive spirit still haunts the property. And in order to find if he's buried here, they hire a cadaver dog to hunt for his body.
1.4	"The Delta Queen"	Houma, Louisiana	May 6, 2016	0.425
The brothers go on board to investigate the Delta Queen, a haunted river steamboat formerly a floating hotel tied up in Chattanooga, Tennessee and currently docked in Houma, Louisiana for renovations. They learn that a murder took place in the 1950s when the butcher stabbed the chef in the kitchen over a gambling argument. Also, they bring in their fraternity brother Jason on his first investigation to help them contact the spirit of previous captain Ma Greene who died in her cabin in 1949.
1.5	"Magnolia Hotel"	Seguin, Texas	May 13, 2016	0.290
The brothers travel to Seguin, Texas to investigate the Magnolia Hotel, a former stagecoach stop established in 1840 where 13 confirmed murders occurred in a 20-year span, starting in 1874. When they pull up to the house, Marcus can't breathe and is rushed to the hospital. But he comes back to capture evidence of the many spirits that haunt the place, including the ghosts of children, a prostitute, and a man who axed a little girl to death.
1.6	"The Fitzpatrick Hotel"	Washington, Georgia	May 20, 2016	0.295
The brothers stay in their home state to check into the historic and restored Fitzpatrick Hotel, which was built on top of a cemetery and is haunted by a little girl who plays in the halls. And the ghost of Polly Barclay, a local woman who was executed for the alleged murder of her husband in 1806. They learn the legend about a husband who attended a ball here with his wife in the 1930s, however, he brought his mistress as well. When the enraged wife found out, she pushed her out a third-story window, falling to her death.

=== Season 2 (2017) ===
No.	Title	Location	Original release date	U.S. viewers (millions)
2.1	"Thornhaven Manor"	New Castle, Indiana	March 10, 2017	0.408
The Ghost Brothers travel to rural Indiana to investigate the abandoned Thornhaven Manor where a murder took place when the Bailey family lived there. In 1906, caretaker Rueben Bailey was poisoned by his son-in-law Frank Thurman after finding out the family was going to contact the police after he sexually assaulted his sister-in-law. Even since Thurman died in prison for the murder of Rueben, people have claimed to see both their apparitions.
2.2	"Longleaf Sawmill"	Longleaf, Louisiana	March 17, 2017	0.477
The Ghost Brothers travel to rural Louisiana to investigate the Longleaf Sawmill, a former lumber mill that is so haunted that the locals nicknamed it the "Mill of Death" due to its history of tragic accidents and murders. Now a part of the Southern Forest Heritage Museum, the whole complex is filled with the spirits of workers who died here, including "Dead Man Stokes", who dangerously operated the skidder machine that killed many of his fellow workers.
2.3	"Winchester Mystery House"	San Jose, California	March 24, 2017	0.535
The brothers travel to Northern California to the Winchester Mystery House, a 160-room mansion built like a maze by Winchester Rifle heiress Sarah Winchester to confuse the ghosts who were victims of her company's weapons over the decades. They're also the first paranormal team to investigate the unfinished section on the third floor and hire a psychic to make contact with the spirits by conducting a seance.
2.4	"Old City Jail"	Charleston, South Carolina	March 31, 2017	0.419
The brothers head to Charleston, one of the most haunted places in the country, to investigate the city's most paranormally active location, the Old City Jail, where an estimated ten thousand people died due to unsanitary conditions. During their investigation, they try to make contact with the first female serial killer, Lavinia Fisher who, along with her husband John, had murdered over a hundred guests using poison tea at their inn.
2.5	"Rose Hall"	Montego Bay, Jamaica	April 21, 2017	0.254
The brothers travel to Jamaica to investigate Montego Bay's infamous Rose Hall, where they learn the story of the White Witch who haunts her former great plantation house.
2.6	"Cocke County Memorial Building"	Newport, Tennessee	April 28, 2017	0.252
2.7	"Poasttown Elementary School"	Middletown, Ohio	May 5, 2017	0.256
2.8	"House of Wills"	Cleveland, Ohio	May 12, 2017	N/A

== Spin-off ==
On July 17, 2019, it was announced that a spin-off series titled, Ghost Brothers: Haunted Houseguests, would premiere on August 16, 2019 on Travel Channel.

A second spin-off, Ghost Brothers: Lights Out ran for two seasons of eight episodes each from 2021 until 2022.
