= Dave Longaberger =

Basket company founder

Dave W. Longaberger (1934–1999) was an American businessman who founded the now-defunct Longaberger Company, which made handcrafted maple wood baskets and accessories and became notable in the Newark, Ohio area for the "Big Basket Building" that became the company headquarters in 1997. Dave had two daughters, Tami Longaberger, who was CEO of the Longaberger Company, and Rachel Longaberger Stukey, President of the Longaberger Foundation.

Longaberger grew up in a poor family of 14. He suffered from a stuttering problem and epilepsy, and did not graduate from high school until he was 21. He began his basket business in 1971.

== Legacy ==
Longaberger was also a philanthropist, focusing on Dresden, Ohio. He gave millions of dollars to the local community and schools, and provided much-needed services to the community.

Longaberger was interested in history. Later, after he became prosperous, Longaberger undertook the restoration of many historic buildings in the Dresden, Ohio area. Some of the buildings saved were:

- The Captains House (1846),
- The Dresden Hotel (early 20th century),
- The Dresden Iron Mill (circa 1880),
- The Dresden Woolen Mill (circa 1890),
- The Prospect Place Estate (1856),
- The Riversale Mansion, Trinway (circa 1850),
- The Dresden railway station.

Additionally, Longaberger purchased and refurbished many other historic buildings on Main Street in Dresden, Ohio.
