= Frazeysburg, Ohio =

- Village
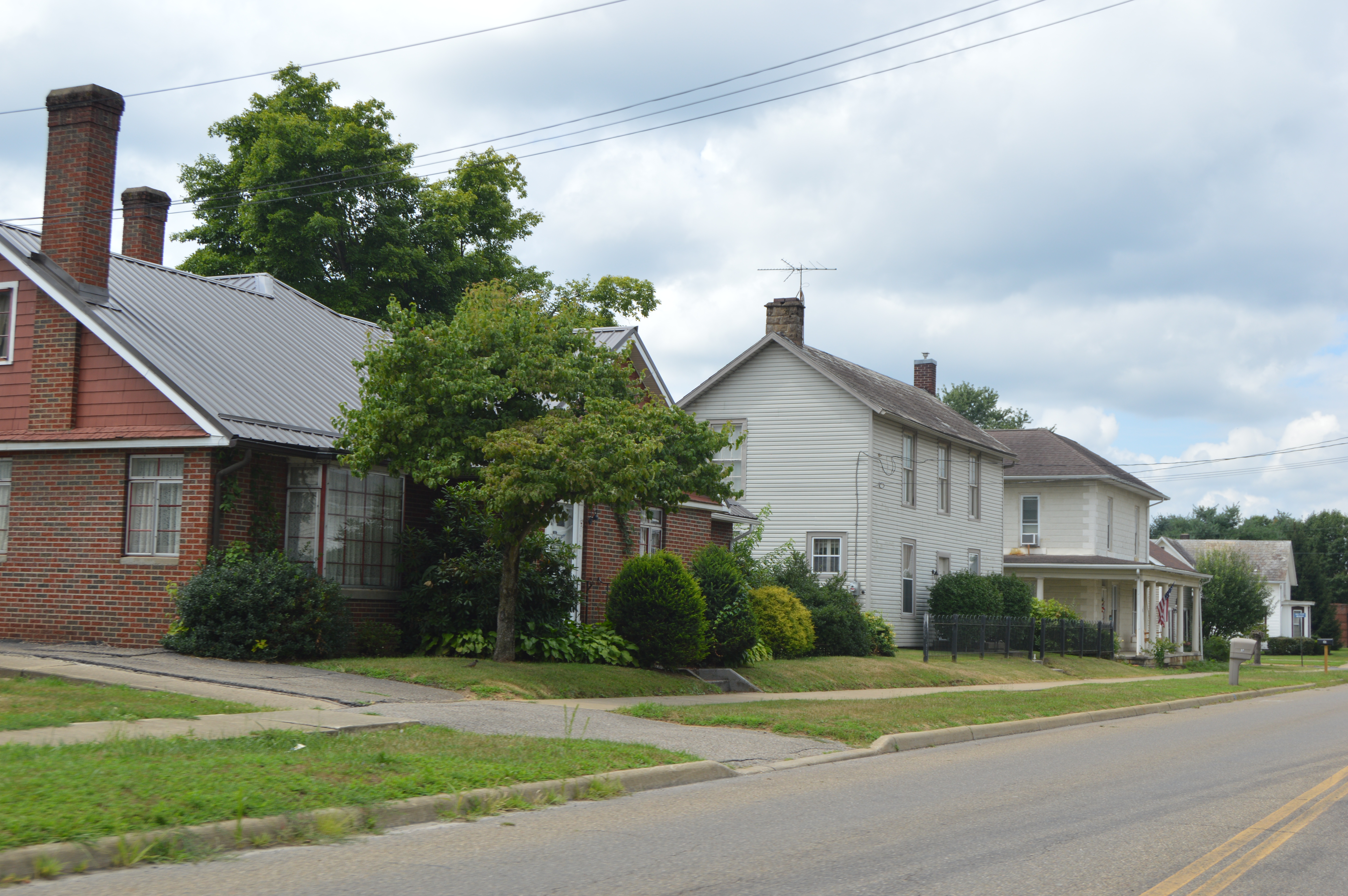
- Third Street

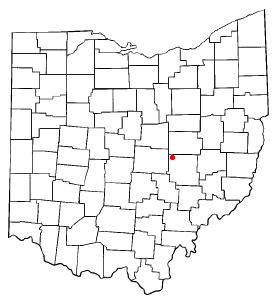
- Location of Frazeysburg, Ohio

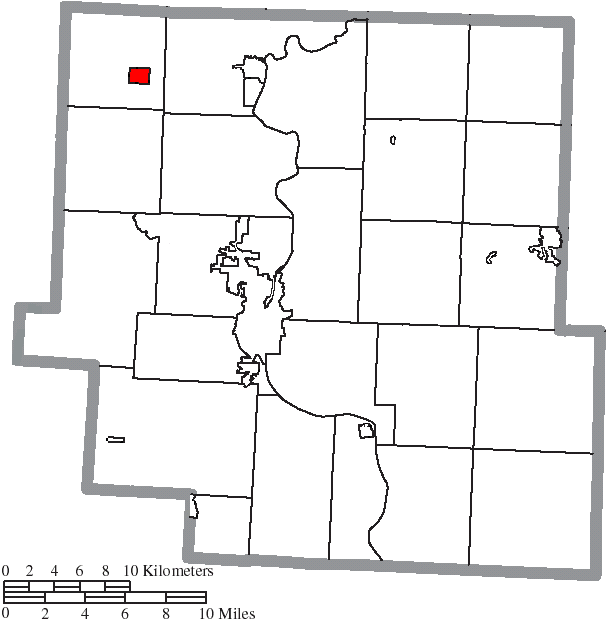
- Location of Frazeysburg in Muskingum County
- Coordinates: 40°07′20″N 82°07′25″W
- Country: United States
- State: Ohio
- County: Muskingum
- Township: Jackson

Area
  - Total: 1.03 sq mi (2.66 km^{2})
  - Land: 1.03 sq mi (2.66 km^{2})
  - Water: 0 sq mi (0.00 km^{2})
- Elevation: 761 ft (232 m)

Population (2020)
  - Total: 1,354
  - Estimate (2023): 1,352
  - Density: 1,318.8/sq mi (509.18/km^{2})
- Time zone: UTC-5 (Eastern (EST))
  - Summer (DST): UTC-4 (EDT)
- ZIP code: 43822
- Area code: 740
- FIPS code: 39-28574
- GNIS feature ID: 2398920
- Website: https://frazeysburg.gov/

Frazeysburg is a village in Muskingum County, Ohio, United States, along Wakatomika Creek. The population was 1,354 at the 2020 census. It is part of the Zanesville micropolitan area. Frazeysburg is home to the world's largest “apple basket” (just an office building disguised as an apple basket), which is located on the Longaberger homestead.

== History ==
Frazeysburg was originally called Knoxville, and under the latter name was laid out in 1827. The town site was sold in 1828 to Samuel Frazey, and named for him. A post office called Frazeysburg has been in operation since 1837. The village was incorporated in 1868.

== Geography ==
According to the United States Census Bureau, the village has a total area of 0.92 square miles (2.38 km^{2}), all land.

== Demographics ==
Historical population
Census	Pop.	Note	%±
1870	325		—
1880	484		48.9%
1890	610		26.0%
1900	730		19.7%
1910	614		−15.9%
1920	667		8.6%
1930	679		1.8%
1940	640		−5.7%
1950	689		7.7%
1960	842		22.2%
1970	941		11.8%
1980	1,025		8.9%
1990	1,165		13.7%
2000	1,201		3.1%
2010	1,326		10.4%
2020	1,354		2.1%
2023 (est.)	1,352	▼	−0.1%
U.S. Decennial Census

=== 2010 census ===
As of the census of 2010, there were 1,326 people, 525 households, and 369 families living in the village. The population density was 1,441.3 inhabitants per square mile (556.5/km^{2}). There were 592 housing units at an average density of 643.5 per square mile (248.5/km^{2}). The racial makeup of the village was 97.6% White, 0.1% African American, 0.2% Native American, 0.3% Asian, 0.2% from other races, and 1.7% from two or more races. Hispanic or Latino of any race were 0.5% of the population.

There were 525 households, of which 36.6% had children under the age of 18 living with them, 46.7% were married couples living together, 16.6% had a female householder with no husband present, 7.0% had a male householder with no wife present, and 29.7% were non-families. 23.0% of all households were made up of individuals, and 10.5% had someone living alone who was 65 years of age or older. The average household size was 2.53 and the average family size was 2.91.

The median age in the village was 35.4 years. 27.5% of residents were under the age of 18; 7.1% were between the ages of 18 and 24; 27.5% were from 25 to 44; 24.2% were from 45 to 64; and 13.7% were 65 years of age or older. The gender makeup of the village was 47.7% male and 52.3% female.

=== 2000 census ===
As of the census of 2000, there were 1,201 people, 489 households, and 328 families living in the village. The population density was 1,579.4 inhabitants per square mile (609.8/km^{2}). There were 525 housing units at an average density of 690.4 per square mile (266.6/km^{2}). The racial makeup of the village was 97.50% White, 1.08% African American, 0.08% Native American, 0.33% Asian, 0.08% from other races, and 0.92% from two or more races. Hispanic or Latino of any race were 0.50% of the population.

There were 489 households, out of which 37.0% had children under the age of 18 living with them, 48.7% were married couples living together, 13.3% had a female householder with no husband present, and 32.9% were non-families. 29.2% of all households were made up of individuals, and 11.5% had someone living alone who was 65 years of age or older. The average household size was 2.46 and the average family size was 3.05.

In the village, the population was spread out, with 29.0% under the age of 18, 9.8% from 18 to 24, 30.0% from 25 to 44, 19.9% from 45 to 64, and 11.3% who were 65 years of age or older. The median age was 32 years. For every 100 females there were 85.3 males. For every 100 females age 18 and over, there were 83.0 males.

The median income for a household in the village was $34,545, and the median income for a family was $39,044. Males had a median income of $30,119 versus $21,053 for females. The per capita income for the village was $15,789. About 2.8% of families and 6.6% of the population were below the poverty line, including 5.6% of those under age 18 and 15.1% of those age 65 or over.

== Education ==
Frazeysburg is located in the Tri-Valley Local School District, with children attending school in Frazeysburg for grade school and schools in Dresden for intermediate and high school.

The original Frazeysburg High School building was built in the early 1900s, with the sports teams known as the Red Raiders (thus the reason state route 16 in northwest Muskingum County is named Raiders Road). The school was renamed Frazeysburg-Nashport High School after the closure of Nashport High School due to the creation of Dillon Lake. In 1966, Frazeysburg-Nashport High School merged with Jefferson High School and Adamsville High School to form Tri-Valley High School, which was constructed in Dresden. The old high school building in Frazeysburg then served many years as a junior high school for students from Nashport, Frazeysburg, and Dresden. It then served as an Intermediate School, containing fifth and sixth graders. The old high school was torn down in August 2008, with a time capsule being discovered in the building.

== Notable people ==
- Melvin Mayfield - recipient of the US Medal of Honor - for his actions in World War II.
- Gilbert Van Tassel Hamilton - psychiatrist
- Milton C. Whitaker - chemist, born in Frazeysburg
