= Larry Vickers (soldier) =

American soldier, firearms instructor and author

- Born: June 1963 (age 63); Adams Mills, Ohio, United States
- Military career
- Allegiance: United States
- Branch: United States Army
- Rank: Master sergeant
- Units: 5th Special Forces Group; 11th Special Forces Group; A Squadron, Delta Force
- Conflicts: Operation Just Cause: Operation Acid Gambit; Operation Desert Storm
- Awards: Bronze Star Medal with V for Valor

Larry Allen Vickers (born June 1963) is a retired soldier, former firearms instructor, and author. He is the founder of Vickers Tactical, and co-founder of the International Defensive Pistol Association and Firearms Training Association.

== Early life ==
Vickers was born in Adams Mills, Ohio, in June 1963. His father served in the North African and Italian campaign of World War II.

When he was in middle school, Vickers decided that he wanted to join the United States Army Special Forces, and gained an interest in firearms during this period. Vickers entered into the Delayed Entry Program and graduated from Tri-Valley High School in 1981.

== Career ==
Vickers participated in Operation Desert Storm, and Operation Acid Gambit, for which he received the Bronze Star Medal. Vickers retired from Delta Force after 20 years of service, mostly due to injuries. Vickers formerly worked for Heckler & Koch, during which time he helped to develop the HK416 and HK45.

Larry Vickers is the author of the "Vickers Guide", a series of reference books that launched in 2015, detailing firearms such as the Colt AR-15, M1911, and MP 40.

In 2009, the Vickers Tactical YouTube channel was created. By 2021, it reached upwards of one million subscribers, and 200,000,000 views.

== Personal life ==
Vickers is a fan of the AK-47, and has an autograph from Mikhail Kalashnikov. In 2021, Vickers was diagnosed with cancer.

Vickers has an affinity for Rhodesia, and in 2017 posted a photo of a Rhodesian FAL with the caption "It's time to slot floppies. ..." (floppies being a racial slur and slot being Rhodesian slang for shoot). He believes that the fall of Rhodesia was "the greatest tragedy of the post-World War II era."

== Guilty plea on federal gun charges ==
On October 19, 2023, Larry Vickers pleaded guilty to participating in a conspiracy to import and obtain machine guns and other restricted firearms (short-barreled rifles) and admitted that he received some of the imported machine guns and other weapons. As detailed in his plea agreement, from June 2018 to March 2021 Vickers, allegedly with cooperation from Sean Reidpath Sullivan and Matthew Jeremy Hall imported machine guns and other restricted firearms under ATF Form 6 by falsely representing them as items for police department demonstration use. At the time, Sullivan was the owner of Trident Rifles in Gambrills, Maryland and an intelligence analyst for the Department of Homeland Security, while Hall was chief of police in Coats, North Carolina. Vickers retained machine guns and other restricted weapons in his personal collection, knowing the filed forms were fraudulent, and transferred other machine guns and restricted weapons to other FFLs and third parties.

Vickers also pleaded guilty to a conspiracy to violate U.S. sanctions against JSC Kalashnikov Concern between July 2014 and March 2021, in the Southern District of Florida. From July 2014 to March 2021 Vickers and 3 co-conspirators were seeking capital investment, technical data, engineering services, firearms, firearm parts, from individuals representing Kalashnikov Concern to "develop a U.S. business that would manufacture Kalashnikov-style firearms to be sold in the U.S. market and fill the gap left by the sanctions against Kalashnikov Concern" named "American Kalashnikov." Vickers had met with Kalashnikov Concern executives in North Carolina and started to receive consulting fees from American Kalashnikov starting from 2014. From July 2015 Vickers and several others provided promotional videography and marketing services valued between $10,000 and $200,000 to Kalashnikov Concern, receiving preferential access to the company's personnel and technical data.

Vickers faces a maximum sentence of five years in federal prison for conspiracy to violate federal law regulating automatic firearms and a maximum of 20 years in federal prison for conspiracy to violate the International Emergency Economic Powers Act. U.S. District Judge Julie R. Rubin had not scheduled sentencing for Vickers as of February 2024.
