= Wakatomika, Ohio =

Unincorporated community in Ohio, U.S.

Coordinates: 40°11′55″N 82°02′49″W

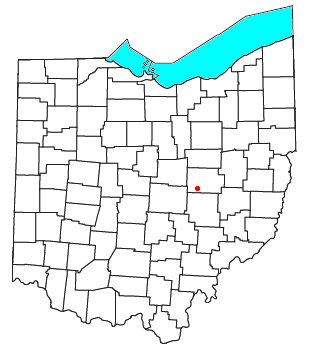
Location of Wakatomika, Ohio

Wakatomika is an unincorporated community in central Washington Township, Coshocton County, Ohio, United States. Wakatomika is located on the Little Wakatomika Creek, and lies along State Route 60.

== History ==
A post office was established at Wakatomika in 1823, and remained in operation until 1909. The community is named after the Shawnee village of Wakatomika, which was located along the Muskingum River near the present day site of Dresden.
