= Havemeyer Hall =

Academic building of Columbia University

Coordinates: 40°48′33.49″N 73°57′44.18″W

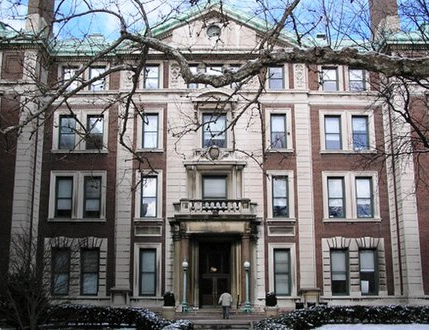
Havemeyer Hall

Havemeyer Hall is a historic academic building located in Columbia University in New York City.

== History ==
It was built between 1896 and 1898, under the direction of Charles Frederick Chandler and named after Columbia graduate Frederick Christian Havemeyer, a member of the Havemeyer family. The building is one of six original buildings on the Morningside Heights campus in Columbia and a National Historic Chemical Landmark. The Department of Chemistry of the university is based in Havemeyer Hall, and the majority of chemistry classes are taught there.

Many important experiments in the history of chemistry have been conducted in the building, as well as significant research by some of the most well known chemists of the 20th century including Marston Taylor Bogert, Henry C. Sherman, Milton C. Whitaker and John Maurice Nelson. Seven individuals who researched in Havemeyer eventually received the Nobel Prize in Chemistry, including Irving Langmuir who won in 1932 for his work on surface chemistry and Harold Clayton Urey in 1934 for his discovery of deuterium.

Aside from scientific and academic research, the building has appeared in several movies, in particular room 309, the grand, multi-level lecture hall designed by Charles Follen McKim. Among the movies filmed there are Spider-Man, Spider-Man 2, Spider-Man 3, Ghostbusters, Mona Lisa Smile, The Mirror Has Two Faces, Kill Your Darlings, Malcolm X, Kinsey, Rollover and Awakenings.
