= Melvin Mayfield =

United States Medal of Honor recipient (1919-1990)

- Born: March 24, 1919; Salem, West Virginia, US
- Died: June 19, 1990 (aged 71); Saint Louisville, Ohio, US
- Burial place: Frazeysburg Cemetery, Frazeysburg, Ohio
- Military career
- Allegiance: United States of America
- Branch: United States Army
- Rank: Corporal
- Units: 20th Infantry Regiment, 6th Infantry Division
- Conflicts: World War II
- Awards: Medal of Honor

Melvin Mayfield (March 24, 1919 – June 19, 1990) was a United States Army soldier and a recipient of the United States military's highest decoration—the Medal of Honor—for his actions in World War II.

Mayfield's actions, on July 29, 1945, were the last to earn a Medal of Honor prior to the August 15, 1945, end of hostilities in World War II—though some honorees may have been cited for their Medal after Mayfield's recognition on May 31, 1946.

== Biography ==
Mayfield joined the Army from Nashport, Ohio in February 1941, and by July 29, 1945, was serving as a corporal in Company D, 20th Infantry Regiment, 6th Infantry Division. On that day, in the Cordillera Mountains, Luzon, the Philippines, he single-handedly attacked four enemy positions. For this action, he was awarded the Medal of Honor ten months later, on May 31, 1946.

Mayfield left the Army while still a corporal. He died at age 71 and was buried in Frazeysburg Cemetery, Frazeysburg, Ohio.

== Medal of Honor citation ==
Corporal Mayfield's official Medal of Honor citation reads:

He displayed conspicuous gallantry and intrepidity above and beyond the call of duty while fighting in the Cordillera Mountains of Luzon, Philippine Islands. When 2 Filipino companies were pinned down under a torrent of enemy fire that converged on them from a circular ridge commanding their position, Cpl. Mayfield, in a gallant single-handed effort to aid them, rushed from shell hole to shell hole until he reached 4 enemy caves atop the barren fire-swept hill. With grenades and his carbine, he assaulted each of the caves while enemy fire pounded about him. However, before he annihilated the last hostile redoubt, a machinegun bullet destroyed his weapon and slashed his left hand. Disregarding his wound, he secured more grenades and dauntlessly charged again into the face of pointblank fire to help destroy a hostile observation post. By his gallant determination and heroic leadership, Cpl. Mayfield inspired the men to eliminate all remaining pockets of resistance in the area and to press the advance against the enemy.

== Awards and decorations ==

Badge	Combat Infantryman Badge		
1st row	Medal of Honor	Bronze Star Medal	Purple Heart
2nd row	Army Good Conduct Medal	American Defense Service Medal	American Campaign Medal
3rd row	Asiatic-Pacific Campaign Medal with 3 Campaign stars	World War II Victory Medal	Philippine Liberation Medal

== See also ==
- List of Medal of Honor recipients
- List of Medal of Honor recipients for World War II
