= Little Wakatomika Creek =

Little Wakatomika Creek is a stream which flows through Coshocton and Muskingum counties in Ohio, US. The stream originates north of Tunnel Hill in Coshocton County and flows south through the villages of Tunnel Hill and Wakatomika before entering Muskingum County. Here, it empties into Wakatomika Creek just west of the village of Trinway, near the intersection of State Routes 60 and 16. The stream is part of the Mississippi River catchment via Wakatomika Creek, the Muskingum River and the Ohio River.

== Location ==
- Mouth: Confluence with Wakatomika Creek, Muskingum County at 40°08′59″N 82°02′16″W
- Source: Coshocton County at 40°16′54″N 82°03′01″W

== Alternative names ==
The spelling has varied over the years, with spellings including Wakatomaka, Wakatomia and Tomaka.

In addition, Little Wakatomika Creek specifically is referred to as Paddy's Fork of Wakatomaka Creek on a map of Muskingum County from the 1830s, and as Paddy Run in an early history of Coshocton County.

== See also ==
- List of rivers of Ohio
