= Milton C. Whitaker =

American chemist (1870–1963)

- Born: December 16, 1870; Frazeysburg, Ohio
- Died: 1963
- Occupation: Chemical Engineer
- Known for: Perkin Medal (1923); Patents

Milton C. Whitaker (1870-1963) was a noted American chemist. His areas of speciality were chemical engineering and industrial chemistry.

== Personal life ==
Whitaker was born in Frazeysburg, Ohio, December 16, 1870, to R.B. Whitaker and Jennie Magruder. The family moved to Colorado in 1880. Whitaker graduated from Boulder School in 1887 and Colorado State Preparatory School in 1890. He worked as a mechanic and millwright for three years, designing and erecting two large mills for Mancos Lumber Company.

In 1900 he married Mabel Martin of Denver, member of the class of 1898 of the University of Colorado. They had two sons, John and Robert.

The Whitakers resided in the Ambassador Hotel, New York for the latter part of their lives.

== Education ==
In 1893 Whitaker entered the University of Colorado. He studied under Professor Charles S. Palmer, the head of the department of chemistry, who inspired him to make chemistry his major. He also studied mineralogy, geology, petrology, metallurgy, assaying, mechanical engineering and electrical engineering. He assisted in the chemical laboratory, as well as doing some teaching.

Whitaker received his Bachelor of Science in 1898, and a Master of Science in 1900. In 1913, his alma mater awarded him an honorary doctorate of Laws. In 1915 he received an honorary doctorate of Chemical Engineering from the University of Pittsburgh.

== Career ==
In 1898 Whitaker was appointed the post as instructor in chemistry for the sophomore class of Columbia College. In 1902 Charles F. Chandler, a colleague at Columbia, recommended him as a chemist for the Welsbach Light Chemical Company in Gloucester City, New Jersey, where he was made superintendent of all manufacturing departments by 1903. He devoted seven years to directing research work, solving chemical and engineering problems, and developing the factories at Philadelphia and Columbus. From 1908 to 1910 he was a special lecturer on works management at the Massachusetts Institute of Technology.

In 1910 he returned to Columbia University as professor of industrial chemistry and chemical engineering. He directed the conversion of the basement of Havemeyer Hall into a comprehensive chemical engineering laboratory. He was head of the chemical engineering department for six years until 1917.

In 1916 he became general manager of the Curtis Bay Chemical Company, and in 1917 was its president. In November 1917 he also became president of the U.S. Industrial Chemical Company, successor to the Curtis Bay Chemical Company, and also vice president/director of the U.S. Industrial Alcohol Company.

From 1911 to 1916 he was also editor of The Journal of Industrial and Engineering Chemistry, one of the official journals of the American Chemical Society. He was chairman of the New York Section of the Society of Chemical Industry, vice president of the American Institute of Chemical Engineers, and president of the Chemists' Club. From 1918 to 1920 he was Director Emeritus of the Research Corporation for Science Advancement.

Between 1912 and 1921 he was granted twenty-two U.S. patents for items and processes ranging from removing nickel from hydrogenized fat to apparatus for producing ethylene.

In 1923 he was awarded the Perkin Medal, which he described as 'the greatest honor that can be conferred upon a chemist by his fellow workers'. In his acceptance speech he went on to say: 'I am deeply appreciative of the distinction which your committee has bestowed upon me, and doubly grateful to receive the beautiful symbol of the honor from you, sir, a Perkin Medalist yourself and by unanimous consent the beloved dean of our profession.' He was referring to Charles F. Chandler, a mentor of his during his time at Columbia University.
