= Prospect Place =

Historic house in Ohio, United States

- U.S. National Register of Historic Places
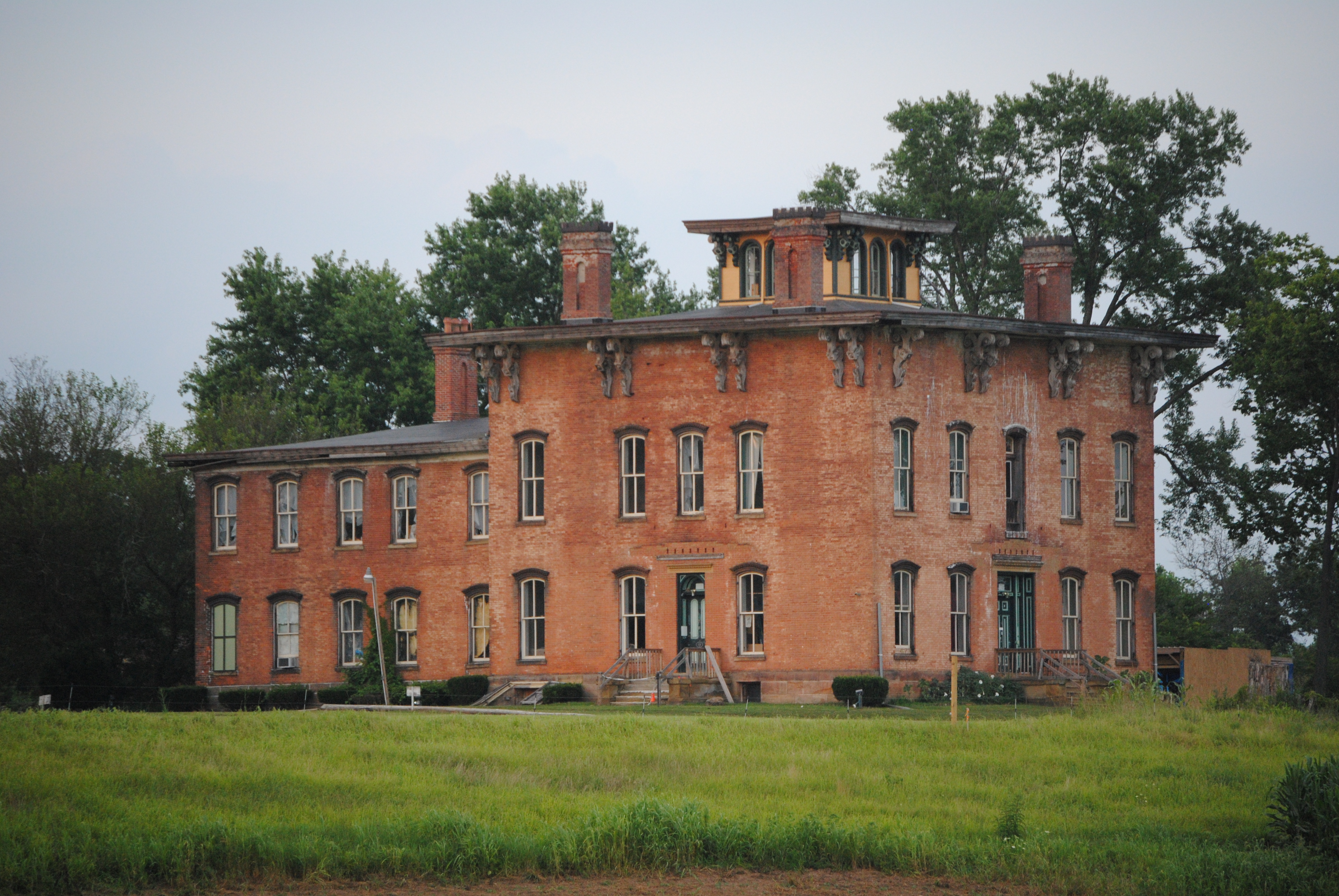

- Location within Ohio Location within the United States
- Location: 12150 Main Street, Trinway, OH 43842
- Nearest city: S of Trinway on OH 77, Trinway, Ohio
- Coordinates: 40°8′5″N 82°0′42″W
- Area: 4 acres (1.6 ha)
- Built: 1856
- Architectural style: Italianate/Greek Revival
- NRHP reference No.: 79001913
- Added to NRHP: May 10, 1979

Prospect Place mansion as it appeared in the 1866 epigraphic survey of southeastern Ohio.

Prospect Place House

Prospect Place, also known as The Trinway Mansion and Prospect Place Estate, is a 29-room mansion built by abolitionist George Willison Adams (G. W. Adams) in Trinway, Ohio, just north of Dresden in 1856. Today, it is the home of the non-profit G. W. Adams Educational Center, Inc. The mansion is listed on the National Register of Historic Places and the Ohio Underground Railroad Association's list of Underground Railroad sites.

This home featured many new and, for the time, revolutionary innovations. It had indoor plumbing which included a copper tank cistern on the second floor which pressurized water throughout the house. Two coal stoves had copper tanks (under pressure from the cistern system) which heated water and allowed the home to have both hot and cold running water service.

This is the second house to stand on the same foundation. The first house was destroyed by an arson-related fire shortly after its completion. The mansion was rebuilt after the fire, with modern fire stopping added to it. The interior walls of the current house are solid brick, and there is a two-inch layer of mortar between the first and second floors of the house to block fire.

Prospect Place also featured a unique refrigeration system to cool milk, cheese, butter, etc. A primitive form of "air conditioning" was created by bringing cool basement air into the living quarters during the summer months via ducts in the outside walls.

== George Willison Adams ==
Born in Fauquier County, Virginia, on October 29th, 1799 to George Beal Adams (1747 - 1827) and his wife Anna Turner (1754 -1827), George Willison Adams (or G.W. as he was called) was last of thirteen children. His father inherited the family plantation gave up his land and home to move away from the slaveholding South. The family migrated to southeastern Ohio in 1808, freed their slaves and settled in Madison Township, Muskingum County, near the town of Dresden, Ohio.

Like his father, G. W. Adams became a strong abolitionist. He and his brother, Edward (1797 - 1861), ran an Underground Railroad "station" from their mill at what later became known as Adams Mills, Ohio.

G. W. Adams was once a member of the Ohio General Assembly (1840-1841).

Together with several other prominent citizens, Adams formed a stock company to build a suspension bridge across the Muskingum River near Dresden. When the other members of the company became fearful that the plan was not feasible and that they would lose their money, Adams built the bridge at his own expense; his nephew, George Copeland (1817 - 1907), was the engineer. The bridge operated as a toll bridge for several years before Adams eventually sold the bridge to the county commissioners for one-third of the original building cost of the bridge. Copeland was later involved in the construction of Brooklyn Bridge.

Later in life, Adams was the President of the Steubenville and Indiana Railroad. He directed construction of the Cincinnati and Muskingum Valley Railroad. His land holdings totaled 14,500 acres (59 km^{2}) with the Prospect Place Mansion in the center of his plantation.

G. W. Adams was an important figure in Ohio politics, the Underground Railroad and regional development of the southeastern Ohio area, and served a term in the Ohio Legislature. His importance in these areas was a criterion used to include the Prospect Place Mansion on the National Register of Historic Places.

G. W. Adams was married twice. He married Clarissa Hopkins Shaff (1824–1853) in 1845. They had four children together—Edward Adams (1847 - 1853), Anna Turner Adams Cox (1847 - 1924), Mary Adams (1849 - 1941) and Elizabeth Adams Endicott (1850 - 1955). After the death of his first wife, he married Mary Jane Robinson (1832–1915) in 1855. They had six children together—Sophia Adams (1857 - 1919), James Robinson Adams (1858 - 1879), John Jay Adams (1860 - 1926), Charles Willison Adams (1863 - 1934), Jessie Bingham Adams Huggins (1864 - 1923) and Florence Adams (born and died in 1871). G. W. Adams died on August 31, 1879, at home. He was 79. Adams is buried in Dresden Cemetery in Dresden, Muskingum County, Ohio.

=== Underground Railroad operation ===
The Underground Railroad operation conducted by G. W. Adams and his brother, Edward, was a huge undertaking. The brothers operated a flouring mill on the Ohio and Erie Canal and owned warehouses, a boat yard and cooper shops in Dresden, Ohio. When men from the Adams company would take flour to New Orleans, Louisiana, they would return with refugees (runaway slaves) beneath the decks of their boats.

It is also known that in 1856 Adams donated money to the American Colonization Society.

== Recent history ==
The mansion passed through the Adams-Cox family to George Cox (1883-1974), a grandson of G. W. Adams, who owned the property until the 1960s. In 1969 the home was sold to Eugene Cox (no relation to George Cox). Eugene operated a gravel mining company, the Cox Gravel Company, which proceeded to mine the remaining 275 acres (1.1 km^{2}) associated with the estate. Cox's wife Peggy convinced him to purchase the Edward Adams home in Adams Mills, Ohio, as well. The Cox family lived at the Adams Mills home until Eugene's death in the 1990s.

While the Cox Gravel Company owned the Prospect Place mansion, it was listed on the National Register of Historic Places. The deterioration of the mansion increased due to lack of maintenance and vandalism. The interior of the building was all but gutted by thieves and vandals. The estate was scheduled to be demolished in 1988. Local businessman Dave Longaberger purchased the house to prevent its destruction.

Longaberger installed a new roof on the structure and increased security with the intention of restoring the home as a future Longaberger Basket Company headquarters building. Upon choosing instead to construct the new headquarters of the company in Newark, Ohio, he placed the mansion restoration project on hold.

Dave Longaberger died of cancer in the 1990s. The Longaberger Company continued to maintain security on the property until 2001, when private investors purchased the property with plans to restore and repurpose (adaptively reuse) the mansion into a restaurant and B&B. Financing fell through and a 501(c)(3) non-profit organization, G. W. Adams Education Center, Inc., was established.

The building is allegedly haunted and was featured in an episode of Ghost Hunters on the SyFy Channel in April 2008. It was also featured on Ghost Adventures on the Travel Channel on January 1, 2010, and Ghost Brothers on the Travel Channel on April 26, 2016.

In 2017, George Jeffrey Adams retired as chairman of the Board of the G. W. Adams Educational Center, citing failing health. A new board of trustees was immediately installed and repairs and restoration work were resumed.

=== G. W. Adams Educational Center ===
Headquartered at Prospect Place Mansion, the G. W. Adams Educational Center, Inc., was founded in 2003 by Dr. Felix Spector and his partner, George Jeffrey Adams (of no relation to the G. W. Adams family). The center operates as a historical and educational resource for the region. The primary focus of the center is the history and restoration of the mansion, George W. Adams, and his impact on local/regional communities, and Underground Railroad activities that took place at the mansion. The mansion and grounds are open for free tours on weekends, March - November, from 12pm - 4pm.

Board of Trustees (2026)

- Jeffrey Cole (Executive Director)
- Amy Green (Vice Chair)
- Kristen Ketterer-Everman (Secretary)
- Shawna Stottlemire (Treasurer)
- Carrie Dean (Trustee)
- Jason Dean (Trustee and Facilities Foreman)
- Brad Thomas (Trustee and Facilities Foreman)
- Carrie Paul (Trustee)
- Jayden Collier (Trustee)

Other

- Dave Paul (Consultant)

== See also ==
- George W. Adams House, built 1842, located south of Trinway on Bottom Road, also on the National Register
