= Gilbert Van Tassel Hamilton =

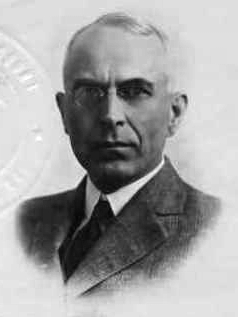
Hamilton in 1923

Gilbert Van Tassel Hamilton (1877–1943) was an American physician and writer. He was the author of Introduction to Objective Psychopathology, one of the leading early manuals on psychopathology, and of A Research in Marriage, a pioneering report on sexual activity that was one of the references used by Havelock Ellis in writing Psychology of Sex. He was also a Socialist.

Born in Frazeysburg, Ohio, in 1877, Hamilton was the son of an Ohio merchant. He received his university education at Ohio Wesleyan University, graduating with the AB in 1898. After completing his degree, he enrolled at Jefferson Medical College in Philadelphia, where he studied the treatment of nervous and mental disorders.

== Sources ==
- Gilbert Van Tassel Hamilton and Introduction to Objective Psychopathology
