= Adams Mills, Ohio =

Unincorporated community in Ohio, U.S.

Coordinates: 40°09′24″N 81°56′48″W

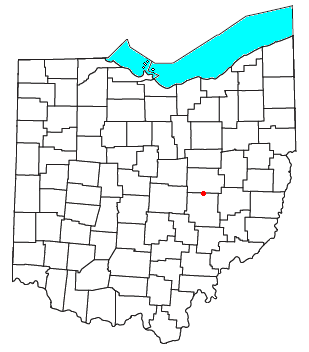
Location of Adams Mills, Ohio

Adams Mills is a small unincorporated community in northeastern Cass Township, Muskingum County, Ohio, United States. It is located on State Route 16 four miles northeast of Dresden. Little more than a grocery stop in the early 20th century, this mostly residential community grew up around the Adams Brothers flouring mill in the 1830s.

== History ==
The village of Adams Mills was settled by employees of the George Willison Adams and Edward Adams Flour Mill which was built on the Ohio and Erie Canal locks at this place. The mill itself was moved in the early 20th century to the nearby town of Dresden, where it was used as a feed mill until it burnt down on February 12, 2009. At some point in the 1840s George and Edward Adams purchased the land around their mill and gave it, free of charge, to their employees to build housing.

Although Adams Mills is unincorporated, it used to have a post office from 1944 to 1990. The postmaster for all 46 years was G.H. Billman. It is still there and is being used as a home. Across the railroad tracks is a small unincorporated community called Preston. It had its own school which is still standing and being used as a home. There are only 15 homes located there today.

Along State Route 16 is Munro Basin, which, in the canal days, was used as a place where canal boats could rest or turn around.

== Historic buildings ==
At least two historic buildings from the 19th century remain in Adams Mills:

- The Edward Adams House (circa 1841)

Built between 1835 and 1840.

- Madison Presbyterian Church (1882)

Madison Presbyterian Church is a member of the Presbytery of Muskingum Valley of the Presbyterian Church (USA). The congregation was founded in 1837 by members of the Dresden Presbyterian Church who lived in the area north of Dresden and desired their own church in that area. The first Madison Presbyterian Church was a wood-frame structure located on the southern bank of the Muskingum River in Madison Township, Muskingum County (thus the name of "Madison" for the Church), south and across the Muskingum River from the current church site. A few years later, the church was moved to a site on a small knoll in the relatively new village of Adams Mills, and again a wood-frame church building was built. With the arrival of the Ohio and Erie Canal in Adams Mills, the village became more prosperous, and a brick church was built in 1882. The stained windows for the church were purchased from the Marshall Brothers Company of Allegheny, Pennsylvania.

== Historic structures ==
The remains of locks 28 and 29 of the Ohio and Erie Canal are located in Adams Mills on the north side of State Route 16. Both locks are located on either side of town. The ditch where the canal boats traveled through is still visible.

== Education ==
Adams Mills is located within the Tri-Valley Local School District, with children from Adams Mills attending elementary, middle and high school in Dresden. Before the schools were combined Adams Mills had two different locations in town where there were schools.
