= Wakatomika Creek =

Tributary of the Muskingum River in central Ohio

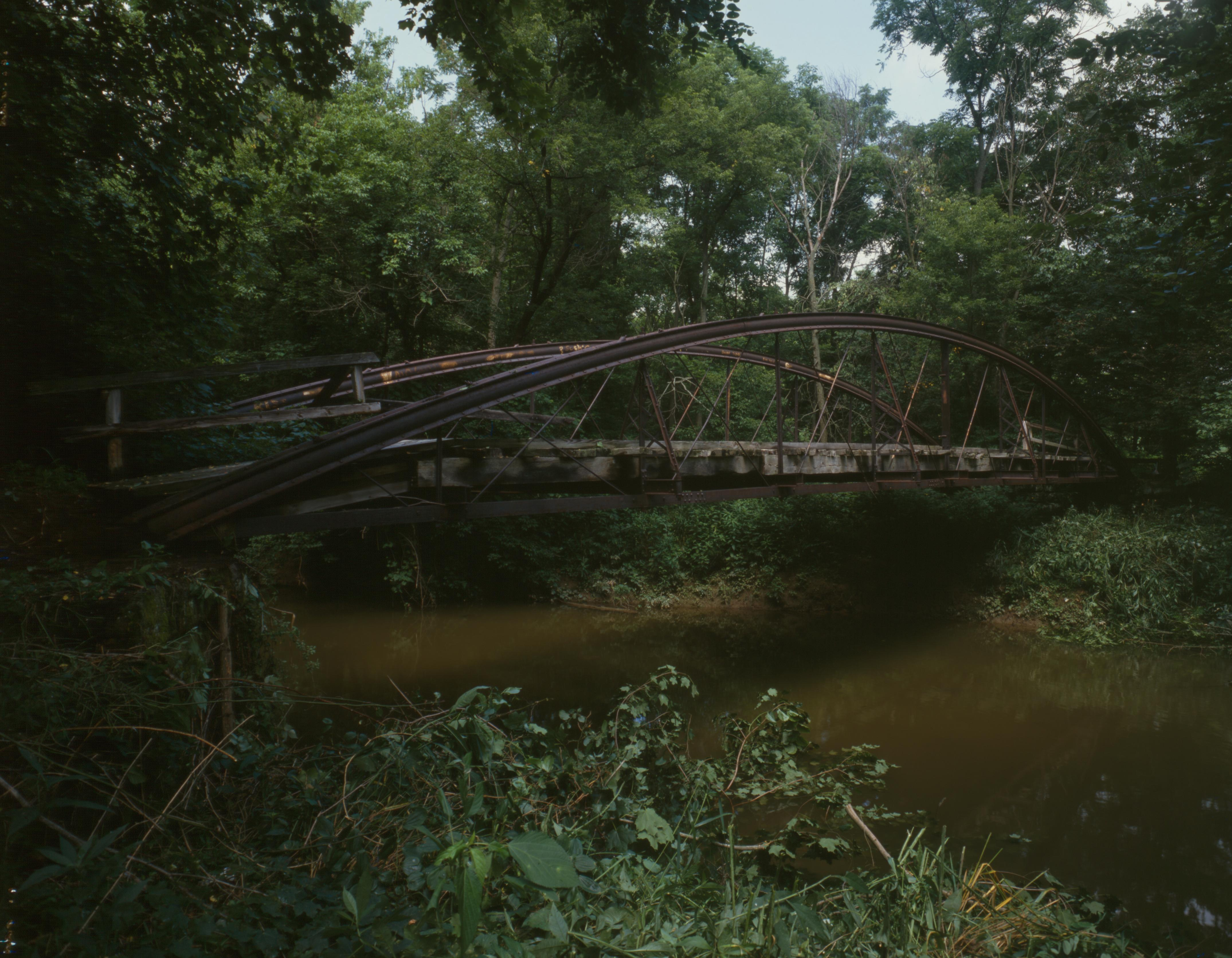
The Mill Road Bowstring Bridge over Wakatomika Creek near Bladensburg in western Jackson Township, Knox County, Ohio, is listed on the National Register of Historic Places.

Wakatomika Creek is a tributary of the Muskingum River, 42.6 mi (68.6 km) long, in central Ohio in the United States. Via the Muskingum and Ohio Rivers, it is part of the watershed of the Mississippi River, draining an area of 234 mi² (606 km²)

== Course ==
Wakatomika Creek rises in western Coshocton County and flows westwardly into Knox County; then southwardly into northeastern Licking and southwestern Coshocton Counties; and eastwardly through northwestern Muskingum County, past the southern edge of the village of Frazeysburg. It joins the Muskingum River from the west at the village of Dresden.

At its mouth, the creek's estimated mean annual flow rate is 257 cubic feet per second (7.3 m^{3}/s). A USGS stream gauge on the creek near Frazeysburg recorded a mean annual discharge of 158 cu ft/s (4.5 m^{3}/s) during water years 1937-2019. The highest daily mean discharge during that period was 9,200 cu ft/s (260 m^{3}/s) on June 28, 1998. The lowest daily mean discharge was 2.6 cu ft/s (0.074 m^{3}/s) on October 3, 1963.

== Location ==
- Mouth: Confluence with the Muskingum River at Dresden 40°07′33″N 82°00′05″W
- Origin: Coshocton County east of Newcastle 40°19′39″N 82°08′46″W

== Tributaries ==
Winding Fork drains much of southern Perry Township and northwestern Pike Township in Coshocton County, and empties into Wakatomika Creek near the State Route 79 bridge over Wakatomika Creek. Brushy Fork drains much of Licking County's Perry Township, and empties into Wakatomika Creek in the very northwestern corner of Muskingum County. Black Run empties into Wakatomika Creek just southwest of Frazeysburg. Little Wakatomika Creek empties into Wakatomika Creek near the intersection of state routes 60 and 16.

== History ==
Wakatomika Creek takes its name from the Shawnee village of Wakatomika, which was located at the mouth of Wakatomika Creek along the Muskingum River, at about the present-day site of Dresden, Ohio. The village was destroyed during Lord Dunmore's War in 1774. After the American Revolution, the valley along Wakatomika Creek was one of the first areas in present-day Muskingum County to be settled by white Americans. The Longaberger Basket Company maintained a large facility in the Wakatomika Valley between Frazeysburg and Dresden.

== Variant names and spellings ==
According to the Geographic Names Information System, Wakatomika Creek has also been known historically as:

- Tomaky Run
- Tomica Creek
- Tomoka Creek
- Wahatomaka Creek
- Wahkatomika River
- Wakadomika Creek
- Wakatomaka Creek
- Wakatomeka Creek
- Wakatomia Creek
- Wakatomica Creek
- Wakatomika River
- Wakatomika Run
- Wakatommika Creek
- Wapatomaka Creek
- Watomika Creek
- Waukatomaka Creek

== See also ==
- List of rivers of Ohio
