= Adamsville, Ohio =

- Village
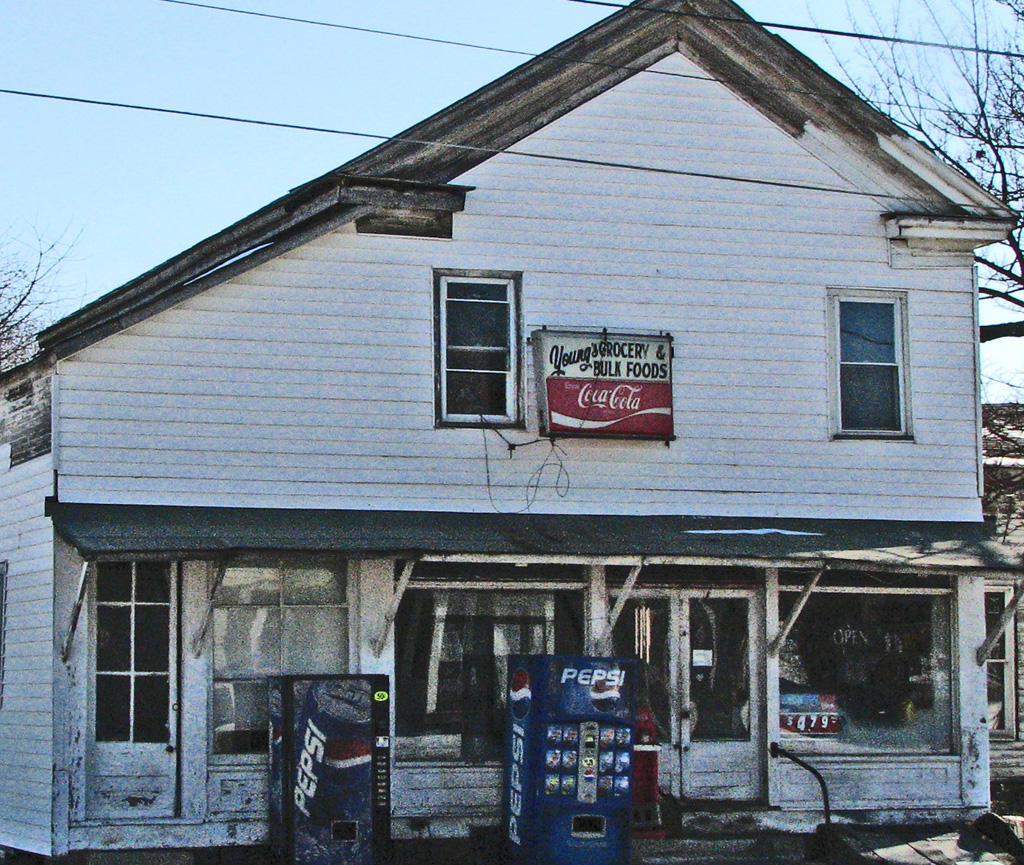
- Country store

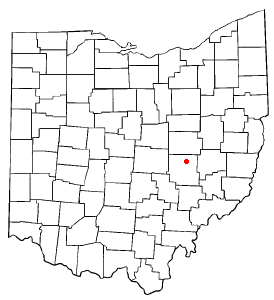
- Location of Adamsville, Ohio

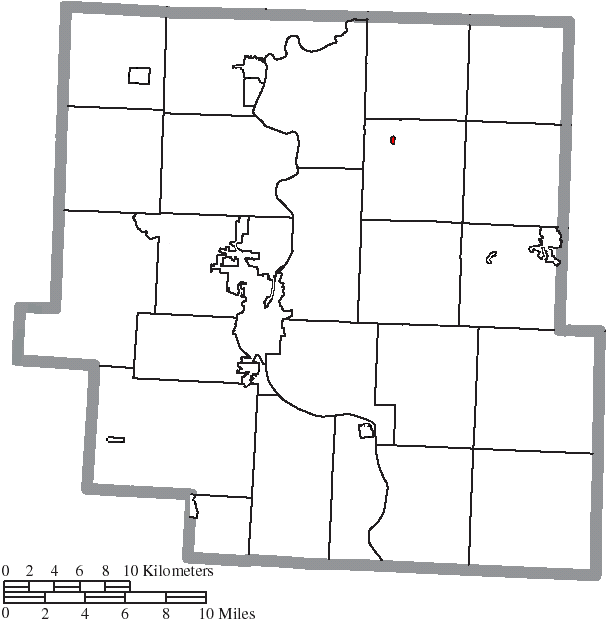
- Location of Adamsville in Muskingum County
- Coordinates: 40°04′08″N 81°52′57″W
- Country: United States
- State: Ohio
- County: Muskingum
- Township: Salem

Area
  - Total: 0.054 sq mi (0.14 km^{2})
  - Land: 0.054 sq mi (0.14 km^{2})
  - Water: 0 sq mi (0.00 km^{2})
- Elevation: 1,020 ft (310 m)

Population (2020)
  - Total: 140
  - Estimate (2023): 137
  - Density: 2,599.7/sq mi (1,003.74/km^{2})
- Time zone: UTC-5 (Eastern (EST))
  - Summer (DST): UTC-4 (EDT)
- ZIP code: 43802
- Area code: 740
- FIPS code: 39-00380
- GNIS feature ID: 2397909

Adamsville is a village in Muskingum County, Ohio, United States. The population was 140 at the 2020 census. It is part of the Zanesville micropolitan area.

== History ==
Adamsville was laid out in 1832 and named after John Quincy Adams or according to another source, Mordecai Adams, the proprietor of the village. A post office called Adamsville has been in operation since 1837. The village was incorporated in 1864.

== Geography ==
According to the United States Census Bureau, the village has a total area of 0.05 square miles (0.13 km^{2}), all land.

=== Climate ===
The climate in this area is characterized by hot, humid summers and generally mild to cool winters. According to the Köppen Climate Classification system, Adamsville has a humid subtropical climate, abbreviated "Cfa" on climate maps.

== Demographics ==
Historical population
| Census | Pop. | Note | %± |
|---|---|---|---|
| 1870 | 280 | | — |
| 1880 | 280 | | 0.0% |
| 1890 | 335 | | 19.6% |
| 1900 | 201 | | −40.0% |
| 1910 | 176 | | −12.4% |
| 1920 | 151 | | −14.2% |
| 1930 | 190 | | 25.8% |
| 1940 | 175 | | −7.9% |
| 1950 | 164 | | −6.3% |
| 1960 | 167 | | 1.8% |
| 1970 | 174 | | 4.2% |
| 1980 | 229 | | 31.6% |
| 1990 | 151 | | −34.1% |
| 2000 | 127 | | −15.9% |
| 2010 | 114 | | −10.2% |
| 2020 | 140 | | 22.8% |
| 2023 (est.) | 137 | ▼ | −2.1% |
U.S. Decennial Census

=== 2010 census ===
As of the census of 2010, there were 114 people, 45 households, and 33 families living in the village. The population density was 2,280.0 inhabitants per square mile (880.3/km^{2}). There were 54 housing units at an average density of 1,080.0 per square mile (417.0/km^{2}). The racial makeup of the village was 99.1% White and 0.9% from two or more races.

There were 45 households, of which 37.8% had children under the age of 18 living with them, 55.6% were married couples living together, 6.7% had a female householder with no husband present, 11.1% had a male householder with no wife present, and 26.7% were non-families. 22.2% of all households were made up of individuals, and 8.8% had someone living alone who was 65 years of age or older. The average household size was 2.53 and the average family size was 2.91.

The median age in the village was 39.6 years. 27.2% of residents were under the age of 18; 7.9% were between the ages of 18 and 24; 29% were from 25 to 44; 21.9% were from 45 to 64; and 14% were 65 years of age or older. The gender makeup of the village was 50.9% male and 49.1% female.

=== 2000 census ===
As of the census of 2000, there were 127 people, 46 households, and 35 families living in the village. The population density was 2,483.6 inhabitants per square mile (958.9/km^{2}). There were 49 housing units at an average density of 958.2 per square mile (370.0/km^{2}). The racial makeup of the village was 100.00% White.

There were 46 households, out of which 39.1% had children under the age of 18 living with them, 56.5% were married couples living together, 8.7% had a female householder with no husband present, and 23.9% were non-families. 19.6% of all households were made up of individuals, and 10.9% had someone living alone who was 65 years of age or older. The average household size was 2.76 and the average family size was 3.17.

In the village, the population was spread out, with 29.1% under the age of 18, 11.8% from 18 to 24, 26.8% from 25 to 44, 26.0% from 45 to 64, and 6.3% who were 65 years of age or older. The median age was 30 years. For every 100 females there were 95.4 males. For every 100 females age 18 and over, there were 104.5 males.

The median income for a household in the village was $35,000, and the median income for a family was $40,000. Males had a median income of $27,813 versus $16,964 for females. The per capita income for the village was $11,703. There were 7.9% of families and 4.8% of the population living below the poverty line, including 13.3% of under eighteens and none of those over 64.
