= Trinway, Ohio =

- Census-designated place
- Location within Ohio Location within the United States
- Coordinates: 40°08′15″N 82°00′43″W
- Country: United States
- State: Ohio
- County: Muskingum
- Townships: Cass

Area
  - Total: 0.28 sq mi (0.72 km^{2})
  - Land: 0.28 sq mi (0.72 km^{2})
  - Water: 0 sq mi (0.00 km^{2})
- Elevation: 738 ft (225 m)

Population (2020)
  - Total: 358
  - Density: 1,278.57/sq mi (493.66/km^{2})
- Time zone: UTC-5 (EST)
  - Summer (DST): UTC-4 (EDT)
- ZIP Code: 43842 (P.O. box)
- Area code: 740
- FIPS code: 39-77434
- GNIS feature ID: 2628979

Trinway is an unincorporated community and census-designated place in Cass Township, Muskingum County, Ohio, United States, in the east-central part of the state. As of the 2020 census, it had a population of 358.

== History ==
The community was originally known as "Dresden Junction", as it was the point where the Cincinnati and Muskingum Valley Railroad met the Steubenville and Indiana Railroad (which later became part of the Pittsburgh, Cincinnati, Chicago and St. Louis Railroad). It was also the site of the first railroad station for the nearby village of Dresden.

=== Historic places ===
There are several buildings of special historic interest in Trinway, including:

- Trinway School/Cass Township Hall (Built 1880 (enlarged 1900), located at 12655 2nd Avenue; Demolished 2026)
- Trinway Methodist Church (Built 1868, located at 12750 2nd Avenue, Trinway)
- The Cochran House (Built 1862, located at 12635 Main Street, Trinway)
- Prospect Place Estate (Built 1856, located at 12150 Main Street, Trinway)

== Geography ==
Trinway is in northern Muskingum County, in the northeastern part of Cass Township. It is 1 mile (2 km) north of the village of Dresden. Ohio State Route 60 passes less than a mile west of Trinway, and State Route 16 passes the same distance to the north. Via State Route 60, it is 17 miles (27 km) to the south to Zanesville, the Muskingum county seat, while Warsaw is the same distance to the north. State Route 16 leads northeast 15 miles (24 km) to Coshocton and west-southwest 22 miles (35 km) to Newark. Columbus, the state capital, is 60 miles (97 km) to the west-southwest of Trinway.

According to the U.S. Census Bureau, the Trinway CDP has an area of 0.28 square miles (0.73 km^{2}), all land. The community lies in a valley less than one mile northwest of the Muskingum River and the same distance north of Wakatomika Creek, a tributary.

== Education ==
Students from Trinway attend the schools of the Tri-Valley Local School District. Historically, all students of Trinway attended the Trinway school. They were moved to Dresden in the mid-1900s.

== Demographics ==
Historical population
Census	Pop.	Note	%±
2010	365		—
2020	358		−1.9%
U.S. Decennial Census

As of the census of 2010, there were 365 people, 138 households, and 91 families residing in the village. The racial makeup of Trinway was 99.7% White, 0.3% African American, 0.0% Native American, 0.0% Pacific Islander, 0.0% from other races, and 0% from two or more races. Hispanic or Latino of any race were 0% of the population.

There were 138 households, of which 33.3% had children under the age of 18 living with them, 50.7% were married couples living together, 10.9% had a female householder with no husband present, and 34.1% were non-families. 29.0% of all households were made up of individuals, and 26.1% had someone living alone who was 65 years of age or older. The average household size was 2.64 and the average family size was 3.24.

In the village the population was spread out, with 33.2% under the age of 19, 1.9% from 20 to 24, 32.1% from 25 to 44, 20.3% from 45 to 64, and 12.6% who were 65 years of age or older. The median age was 39 years. For every 100 females, there were 117 males. For every 100 females age 18 and over, there were 102 males.

About 37 percent of the population is below the poverty line. The per capita income is about $20,000. Less than 2 percent of households have a combined annual income of over $100,000. The majority of the population has resided in their home prior to 1990. Nearly all homes are owner-occupied, with 89% of homes being single unit, and 11% being mobile homes. The majority of real property is worth under $150,000. The highest property value is worth nearly $400,000. 40 percent of the population holds at least a bachelor's degree, and about 10 percent are veterans. The most common occupation is laborer.
