= The Longaberger Company =

American basket manufacturer and distributor

Coordinates: 40°3′49″N 82°20′48″W

- Type: Public
- Traded as: XELB
- Founded: Dresden, Ohio, US (January 1, 1973)
- Founder: Dave Longaberger
- Headquarters: New York, New York, United States
- Key people: Robert W. D'Loren (CEO)
- Products: Baskets, home décor, furniture, wellness, jewelry
- Owner: Robert W. D'Loren
- Parent: Xcel Brands www.xcelbrands.com
- Website: www.longaberger.com

The Longaberger Company was an American manufacturer and distributor of handcrafted maple wood baskets and other home and lifestyle products. The company opened in 1973, and its handcrafted baskets were a popular home decor item in the 1980s and 1990s.

Founded by Dave Longaberger, the family-owned and operated company used multi-level marketing to sell its products. It was one of the primary employers in Dresden, Ohio, before it moved in 1997 to Newark, Ohio. At its peak in 2000, it had $1 billion in sales, employed more than 8,200 people directly, and had about 45,000 independent distributors (called home consultants) selling its products directly to customers. Along with baskets, the product line eventually included wrought iron products, pottery, wooden lids, and other goods.

Its former corporate headquarters on Ohio's State Route 16 is a local landmark known as the Big Basket. Built to resemble the company's top-selling product, the Medium Market Basket, the seven-story edifice is a notable example of novelty architecture.

Longaberger was acquired in 2013 by CVSL, Inc., and closed in 2018. The following year, Xcel Brands acquired the intellectual property and relaunched the brand, expanding it to include home goods such as furniture, food, jewelry and other handcrafted products.

== History ==
In 1919, J. W. Longaberger began an apprenticeship with the Dresden Basket Factory. After the company failed during the Great Depression, Longaberger continued to make baskets on the weekends. Eventually, he and his wife Bonnie Jean (Gist) raised enough money to purchase the closed basket factory and start a business of their own.

The fifth of Longaberger's 12 children, Dave, opened J. W.'s Handwoven Baskets in 1973. Starting in 1978, the company began selling Longaberger baskets through home shows using a multi-level marketing model. Each basket, made in various sizes, was handmade and signed by the maker. At its peak, the company employed more than 8,200 people, not counting its direct sales consultants.

The Academy Awards, the Emmy Awards, the NAACP Image Awards and others have used gift baskets made by Longaberger.

=== Later years ===
A combination of a recession and changing tastes in home decor reduced sales, which dropped from the 2000s peak of $1 billion to about $100 million in 2012. In 2013, the company was taken over by a holding company CVSL, Inc., which later became JRJR Networks.

In May 2015, Tami Longaberger, who had led the company since Dave died in 1999, resigned as chief executive officer and director of the company.

In February 2016, the company said it would sell the Basket Building and move its employees to Longaberger's factory in Frazeysburg, Ohio.

As of April 2016, there were fewer than 75 full-time and part-time employees; about 30 of those still made baskets.

On May 4, 2018, a note was sent out from a sales force supervisor that the company had ceased operations. In June 2018, the company filed for bankruptcy.

The Longaberger brand was revived in 2019 when its intellectual property was purchased by Xcel Brands, led by Robert W. D'Loren, and a licensing agreement was reached with basket-weavers Dresden & Co. Tami Longaberger and her sister took part in the firm's re-launch. D'Loren stopped selling baskets through home parties and rebranded the company to include artisan home goods, furniture, food products, and other items. He also focused on digital marketing through social media.

== Basket building ==
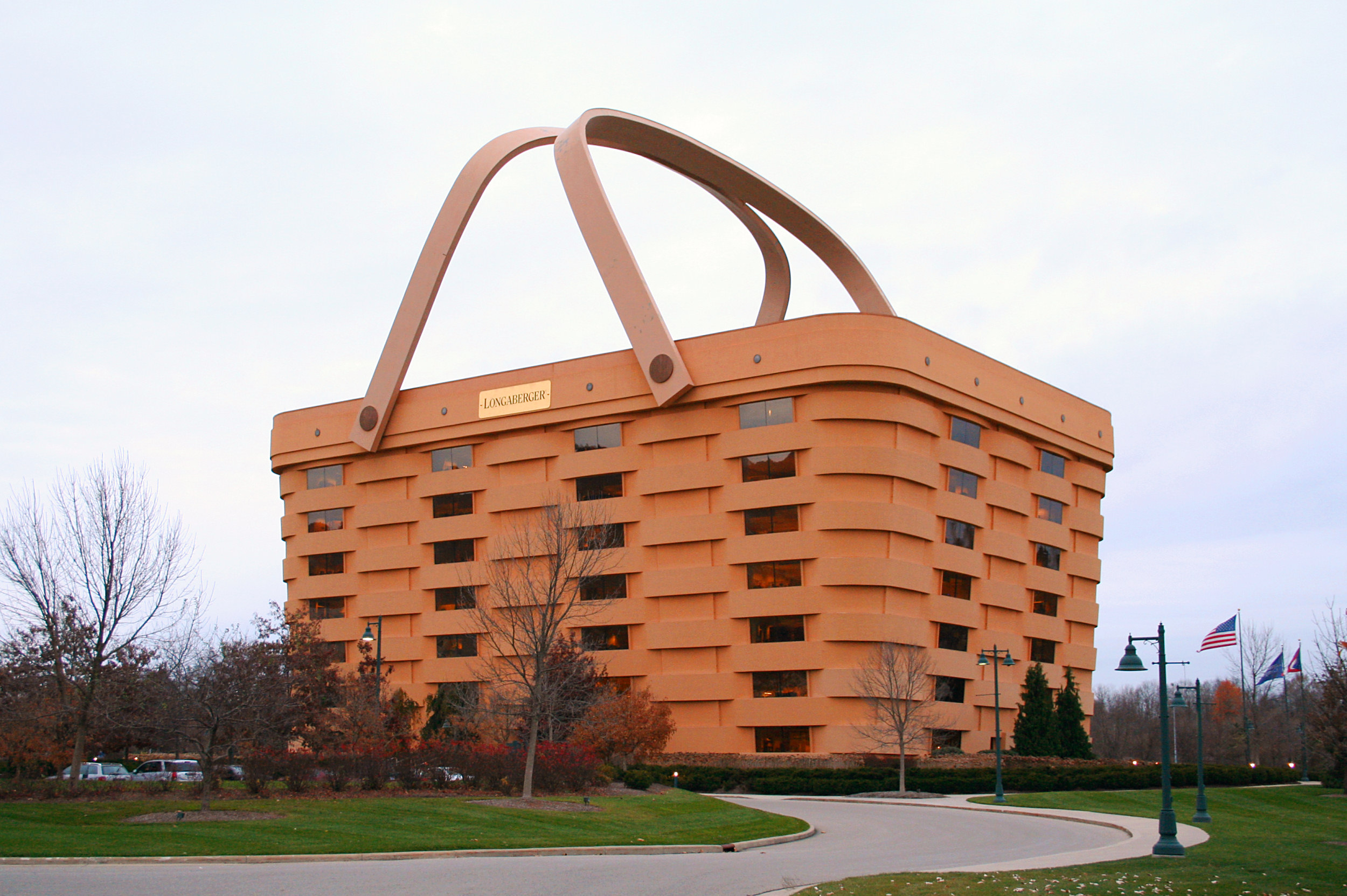
Former headquarters of The Longaberger Company in Ohio

In the 1990s, Longaberger commissioned NBBJ and Korda Nemeth Engineering to build an unusual headquarters on a 21.5-acre lot in eastern Newark: a seven-story building that would resemble one of the company's baskets. The 180,000-square-foot building, located along Ohio State Route 16 on the east side of Newark, opened in 1997.

The building was difficult to design and build because the upper floors were wider than the floors below them; for example, the second floor is 20,000 ft^{2} and the top floor is 25,000 ft^{2}. The basket handles weigh almost 150 tons and can be heated during cold weather to prevent ice from falling onto the building's glass roof.

The company stopped paying property taxes on the building at the end of 2014, and employees moved out in 2016.

In December 2017, the building was purchased for $1.2 million by Steve Coon, a Canton, Ohio-based developer who owns Coon Restoration, and his partner, Bobby George of Cleveland. By November 2018, the pair had put it up for sale. In 2019, Coon said the building had not sold, that he was planning to turn the building into a luxury hotel, and that he was working to have the building added to the National Register of Historic Places.

On October 20, 2019, Heritage Ohio – the state's official historic preservation organization – held the first tour of the building since its 2016 closing as part of fundraising efforts. More than 600 people participated. Executive director Joyce Barrett said "people were in tears and hugging each other" because "they were so happy to be back in the Basket."

In January 2021, the building was back on the market, offered for $6.5 million.

In 2025, local realtor Brandon Hess said Coon aimed to develop the building, most likely as a mixed-use development, perhaps including condos or retail stores. In May 2026, the building was for sale for $8.5 million, with the condition that "it's got to stay a basket."
