= Tri-Valley High School (Ohio) =

Location
- 46 East Muskingum Ave; Dresden, Ohio, Ohio; United States; 40°07′15″N 82°00′18″W

Information
- Type: High school, public
- School district: Tri-Valley Local School District
- Superintendent: Mark Neal
- Principal: Jared Hindel
- Grades: 9–12
- Enrollment: 731 (2023–2024)
- Colors: Gold and black
- Mascot: Scottie Dawg
- Nickname: Scotties
- Website: Tri-Valley High School

Tri-Valley High School, located in Dresden, Ohio, is the high school for the Tri-Valley Local School District, a public school district encompassing northwest and north central Muskingum County, Ohio.

== Athletics ==
=== Ohio High School Athletic Association State Championships ===
- Boys Basketball – 1963*, 1964*

* Titles won by Jefferson High School prior to consolidation in 1966.
