= Dresden, Ohio =

- Village
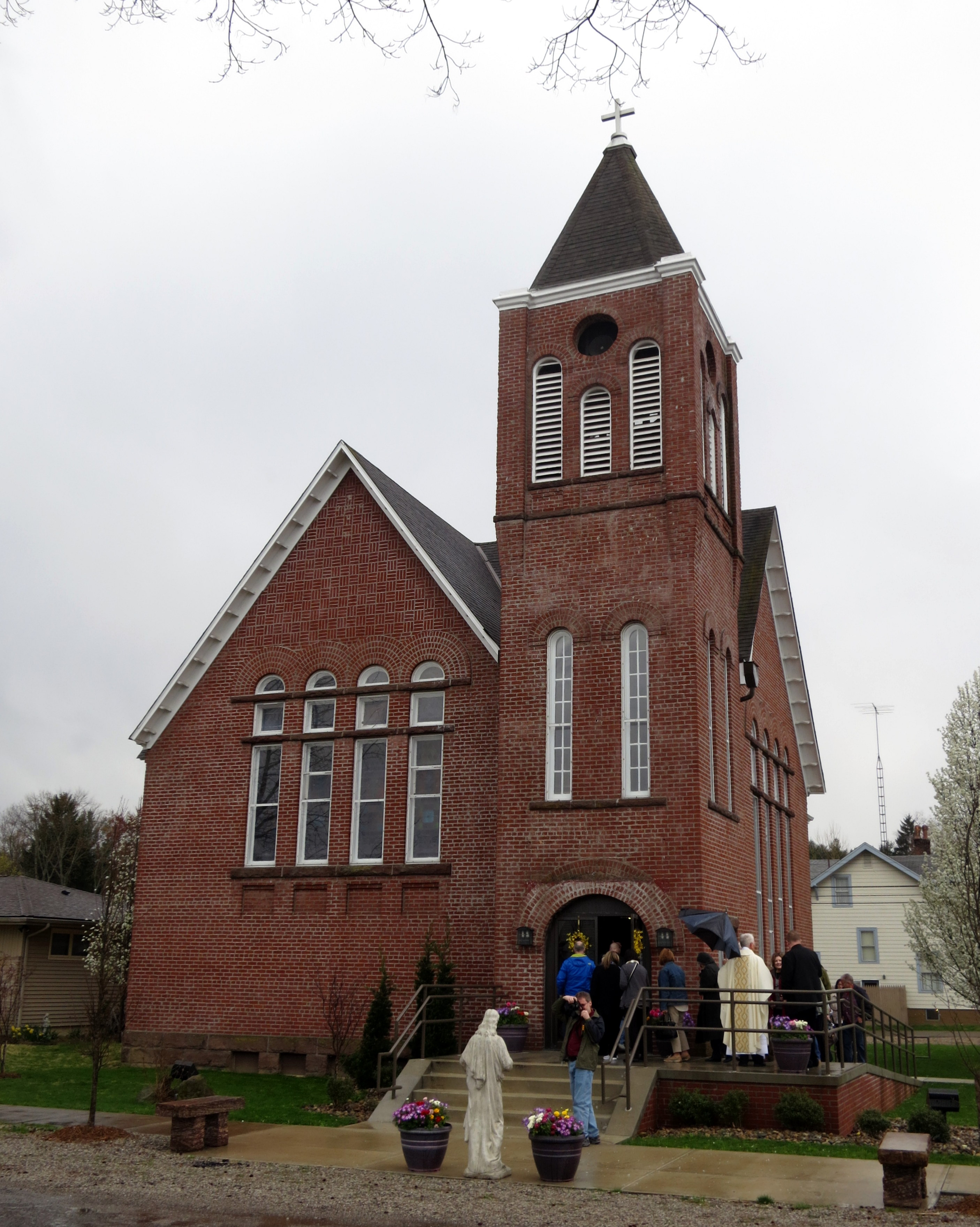
- Saint Ann Catholic Church in Dresden
- Nickname: Basket Village USA
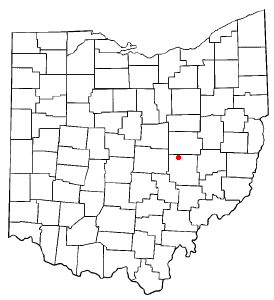
- Location of Dresden, Ohio

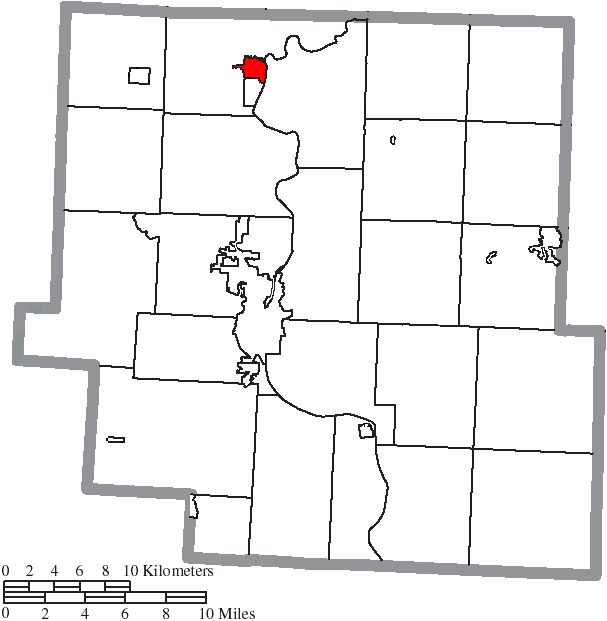
- Location of Dresden in Muskingum County
- Coordinates: 40°07′27″N 82°00′30″W
- Country: United States
- State: Ohio
- County: Muskingum
- Townships: Jefferson, Cass

Government
  - Mayor: Rhonda Holdren

Area
  - Total: 1.31 sq mi (3.40 km^{2})
  - Land: 1.28 sq mi (3.31 km^{2})
  - Water: 0.035 sq mi (0.09 km^{2})
- Elevation: 735 ft (224 m)

Population (2020)
  - Total: 1,650
  - Estimate (2023): 1,647
  - Density: 1,291.3/sq mi (498.58/km^{2})
- Time zone: UTC-5 (EST)
  - Summer (DST): UTC-4 (EDT)
- ZIP code: 43821
- Area code: 740
- FIPS code: 39-22610
- GNIS feature ID: 2398748
- Website: http://www.villageofdresden.com/

Dresden is a village in Muskingum County, Ohio, United States, along the Muskingum River at the mouth of Wakatomika Creek. The population was 1,650 at the 2020 census. It is part of the Zanesville micropolitan area. It was incorporated on March 9, 1835.

== History ==
=== 18th century ===
Dresden is located on or near the site of a Shawnee (Native American) village known as Wakatomika, which gave its name to Wakatomika Creek, the creek that empties into the Muskingum River near the northern edge of the village. These were the easternmost of the Shawnee villages, and the home of the most hostile of that tribe. David Zeisberger, the Moravian missionary, preached there in 1773 in an effort to convert them; but the wrongs done to Chief Logan and other Ohio Native Americans were discussed at this place with much rancor, and war parties had been going out from here against the white settlers in spite of attempts by the Delaware (tribe) to intercede. On August 7, 1774, Colonel Angus McDonald brought 400 men from Fort Pittsburg in the Wakatomica Campaign of Lord Dunmore's War to fight the Shawnee. The settlement of Wakatomika, as well as four other villages, was burned to the ground and three chiefs were taken prisoner.

In 1799, Jonathan Cass became one of the first settlers in the area, claiming 4000 acres of land. His family joined him in 1801. In 1875, the remains of Major Jonathan Cass were removed to the Dresden cemetery, by Dr. Edward Cass, and over the remains of the family in their final resting place has been erected a magnificent monument by the Cass family. Beneath the name of Jonathan Cass is this inscription: "He was a soldier at the battle of Bunker Hill; an officer of the Revolution, and of the army, which, under General Wayne, gave peace to the frontier. From New England, he emigrated to this part of the wilds of the Northwestern Territory. On the military land he purchased, he lived a peaceful and quiet life thirty years, until death claimed him for a victim.

Seth Adams of Boston also settled the area in 1799 and is said to have cultivated the first tomatoes in the county from seed he got from New Orleans. He was also one of the first to plant apple trees and helped to introduce full blooded Merino sheep to the United States. He also built one of the first houses in Dresden.

=== 19th century ===
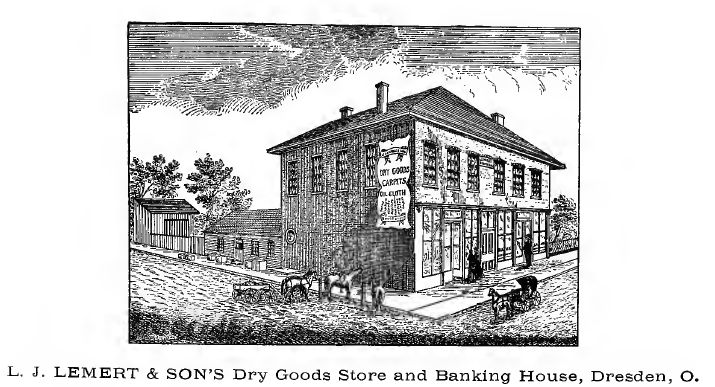

In the 19th century Dresden was an important trading town on the Ohio and Erie Canal. A side cut canal linked the Ohio and Erie Canal with the Muskingum River. Mordecai Ogle settled on a farm about half a mile northeast of Dresden in 1802. In 1804, Seth Adams had a "corn-cracker" mill on Wakatomika Creek.

An election was held in April 1805 to elect officers for Jefferson Township in the home of Henry Northrup. Seth Carhart, Valentine Johnson and Isaac Cordray were elected as trustees. John Wamsley and James Sprague were elected "Overseers of the poor". James Wilcox and William Elben were elected as township fence viewers. Peter Reasoner and Jacob Jackson were elected "listers and appraisers". Henry Northrup and James Tanner were elected "supervisors of highways". At this same time, John Cain was township clerk. Since he wasn't elected in this election, it is reasonable to assume there was at least one election held prior to this one in 1805.

Wyllys Silliman, the son-in-law of Major Jonathan Cass, operated a saw mill and grist mill on Wakatomika Creek in 1806. The dam for this mill washed away in 1832 and was never rebuilt. He also manufactured salt near his mills. On February 15, 1806, Isaac Cordray was elected Justice of the Peace, to fill the vacancy left by the death of Seth Carhart. On April 1, 1809, Joseph Scott was elected to the office without opposition.

In 1812, Seth Adams, who is thought to have been a partner or an agent of David Humphreys, was credited with planting the first tomatoes in the area with seeds he obtained from New Orleans. In 1812 Otho Miller and Jacob Houser were the first blacksmiths and Judge Stillwell was operating a ferry. In 1815, Joseph F. Monroe operated a distillery on his farm about four miles above Dresden on the Muskingum. He was among the first to plant peach and apple trees. He discontinued his distillery after the Ohio canal was finished.

The town of Dresden was laid out in 1817. This was also the year that the first merchant, Laban Lemert, opened for business out of a log house. In 1818, John Cordray began running a tavern out of a log cabin, on the site later occupied by the Akeroyd House. A few years later Abraham Smith took over the running of this establishment. Smith was to later teach school. At this time Peter D. Reasoner was also running a tannery, and a weaver from Maryland, Morgan Morgan, had set up shop as well.

Around 1819 the first physician, Benjamin Webb, came to the township. His son Nathan later succeeded him in the business. In 1821 Drs. Nathan Webb, senior and junior, established the first castor oil mill west of the Allegheny Mountains in Dresden, but they did not stay in the area long. In 1822 Laban Lemert expanded into the distillery business. By 1833 Henry and Benjamin Roop of Buffalo, New York decided to compete with Laban Lemert with their own distillery and became extensive distillers. 1822 also saw the beginning of the construction of the main line of the Ohio Canal in Jefferson Township, which was completed in 1829. The Dresden side-cut was ready for use in 1831.

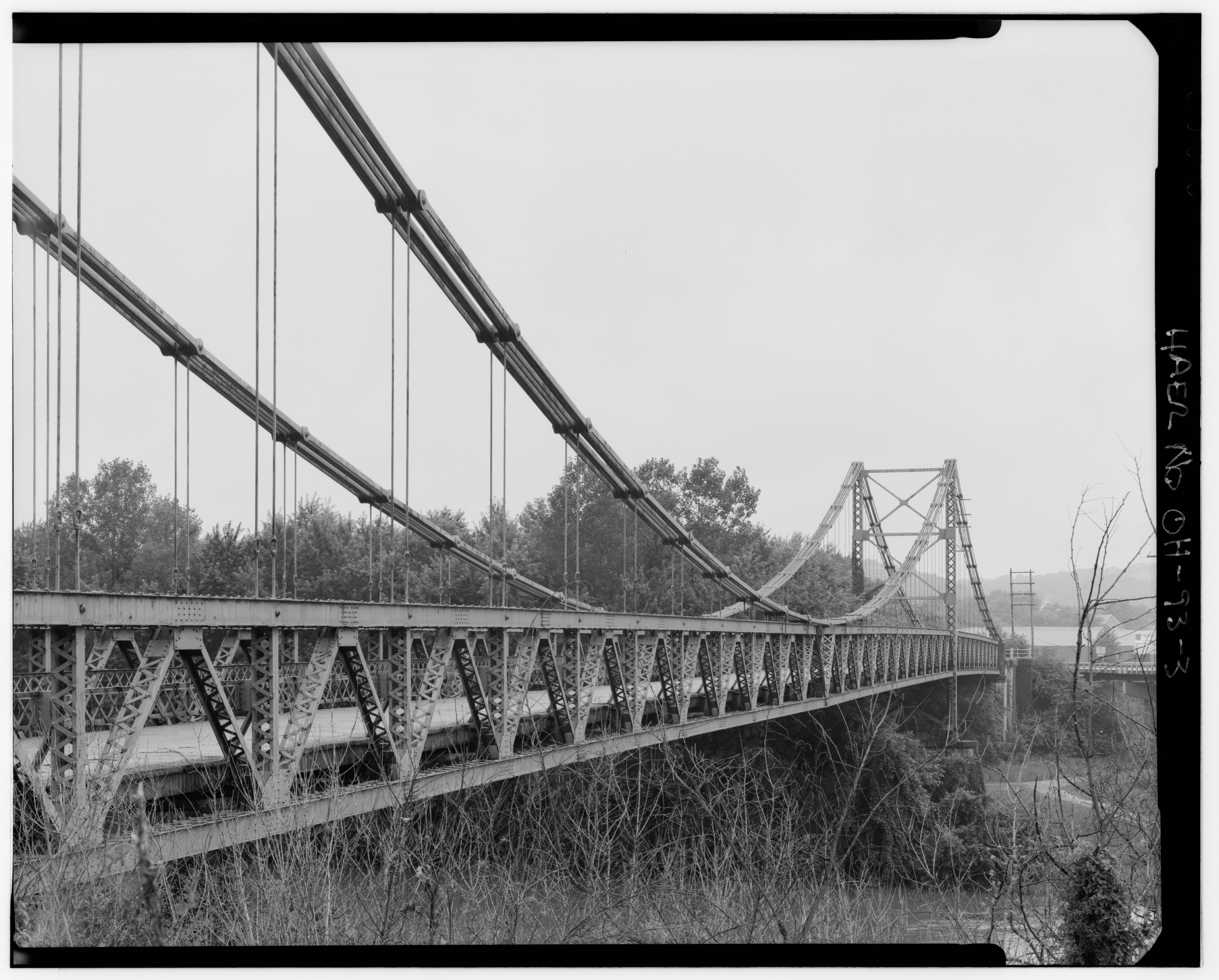
Dresden Suspension Bridge

In 1825, the first Presbyterian services were held in Dresden, occasionally in private houses, but usually in a log schoolhouse on the site of the Union school building. On May 14, 1836, Laban Lemert, G. W. Cass, William W. Bice, T. M. Barrow and Dr. A. H. Brown were appointed to a building committee to build the Presbyterian church. The building was actually started in the latter part of the year and finished in the spring of 1838. The building cost $1,500. In May 1852 the church got their first pipe organ. The building that currently houses the church on Chestnut Street was dedicated on February 29, 1880. In 1835 a brick building was erected on Main Street to house the Methodist Episcopal church. In 1852 it was replaced by a larger building at a cost of $3000.00. In 1839 the congregation of the Zion Protestant Episcopal Church was formed, with Rev. Cushman, rector; William Evans, senior warden and Benjamin Adams, junior warden. The first meetings of the Baptist church were held in 1840 in the old Market house until the frame church was built 1845–6. Starting in 1843, Father Gallinger held monthly services for the Roman Catholic Church in the home of G. A. Peffer. A frame church was built in 1847 and a brick one in 1890. 1852 also saw a small congregation of 24 people organized for the German Methodist Episcopal church. Services were held, first in the Market house and, later, in 1858, a frame church was built.

March 8, 1835, was the date of Dresden's incorporation.

On July 30, 1838, A. Deffenbaugh published the first issue of the town newspaper, Dresden Chronicle. The newspaper was published under that name until 1842 when its name was changed to Journal. The Journal ceased publication in 1844. In 1848, John W. Wallace published a single edition of a newspaper called the Visitor. There wouldn't be another newspaper in Dresden until Wallace and Agnew produced the Advocate in 1850, which had a run of about two years. At that time a man by name of Mr. Sygford took over the paper and changed the name to The Intelligencer. In 1855 Bently took over ownership of The Intelligencer, who in turn sold the paper to M.B. Lovett, who suspended publication around 1877. In 1868, T. W. Peacock and son started a second newspaper in the town called the Dresden Monitor, which they sold to J. A. Jackson a year later. Ownership of the Dresden Monitor then passed through the hands of L. M. Murphy, W. H. Conklin and J. T. Shryock successively. Shryock ran the paper successfully for two years before selling the paper to John W. Martin, who changed its name to Herald and continued publishing it for another six months. In 1874 James W. Wheeling established a newspaper called Dresden Doings which he published bi-weekly. In September 1878 he sold his paper to W.E. Smith. Smith began publishing the paper weekly and continued publishing the Doings until 1879 when it became The Dresden Transcript. The Transcript was still being published weekly as of January 2013.

1848 also was the year a telegraph line from Zanesville to Wooster passed through Dresden and a telegraph office was opened. The office closed several years before Western Union opened its office in 1868.

In 1852, together with several other prominent citizens, George Willison Adams formed a stock company to build the third suspension bridge in the United States across the Muskingum river near Dresden. When the other members of the company became fearful that the plan was not feasible and that they would lose their money, Adams built the bridge at his own expense, his nephew, George Copeland, was the bridge's engineer. It was 1000 feet in length, cost $30,000.00 and was made from materials manufactured in Dresden. The bridge was run as a toll bridge for several years before Adams eventually sold the bridge to the county commissioners for one-third of the original building cost of the bridge. The bridge was eventually destroyed in the Great Flood of 1913.

Also in 1852, L. J. Lemert opened the first bank in Dresden. In 1866 G. Eaton established the second bank in Dresden.

=== 20th century to present ===
The early spring of 1901 saw the beginning of construction of the Dresden telephone exchange. The first subscribers were connected by November 1901.

Dresden is the birthplace of the Longaberger Company, famous for handmade maple splint baskets. Started in 1919 by the J.W. Longaberger family, the company employed nearly 2,000 people as the largest manufacturer of handmade baskets in the United States. The company liquidated in 2018. Its former headquarters in Newark, Ohio is the home of "The World's Largest Basket", according to the Guinness Book of World Records.

The Dresden Plant, a natural gas power plant, was built south of Dresden. It began commercial generation in 2012.

== Geography ==
According to the United States Census Bureau, the village has a total area of 1.18 square miles (3.06 km^{2}), of which 1.14 square miles (2.95 km^{2}) is land and 0.04 square miles (0.10 km^{2}) is water.

== Climate ==
Climate data for Dresden, Ohio
Month	Jan	Feb	Mar	Apr	May	Jun	Jul	Aug	Sep	Oct	Nov	Dec	Year
Record high °F (°C)	75 (24)	75 (24)	86 (30)	90 (32)	95 (35)	103 (39)	105 (41)	102 (39)	106 (41)	92 (33)	83 (28)	77 (25)	106 (41)
Mean daily maximum °F (°C)	36 (2)	41 (5)	51 (11)	63 (17)	72 (22)	80 (27)	84 (29)	82 (28)	76 (24)	65 (18)	52 (11)	40 (4)	62 (17)
Mean daily minimum °F (°C)	20 (−7)	23 (−5)	30 (−1)	40 (4)	49 (9)	58 (14)	62 (17)	61 (16)	53 (12)	41 (5)	33 (1)	24 (−4)	41 (5)
Record low °F (°C)	−24 (−31)	−20 (−29)	−6 (−21)	11 (−12)	20 (−7)	31 (−1)	41 (5)	39 (4)	27 (−3)	17 (−8)	−5 (−21)	−19 (−28)	−24 (−31)
Average precipitation inches (mm)	2.98 (76)	2.53 (64)	3.34 (85)	3.80 (97)	4.55 (116)	4.04 (103)	4.41 (112)	3.65 (93)	3.13 (80)	2.89 (73)	3.48 (88)	3.04 (77)	41.84 (1,064)

== Demographics ==
Historical population
Census	Pop.	Note	%±
1830	391		—
1840	819		109.5%
1850	1,445		76.4%
1860	1,409		−2.5%
1870	1,156		−18.0%
1880	1,204		4.2%
1890	1,247		3.6%
1900	1,600		28.3%
1910	1,549		−3.2%
1920	1,700		9.7%
1930	1,362		−19.9%
1940	1,350		−0.9%
1950	1,310		−3.0%
1960	1,338		2.1%
1970	1,516		13.3%
1980	1,646		8.6%
1990	1,581		−3.9%
2000	1,423		−10.0%
2010	1,529		7.4%
2020	1,650		7.9%
2023 (est.)	1,647	▼	−0.2%
U.S. Decennial Census

=== 2000 census ===
As of the census of 2000, the median income for a household in the village was $38,523, and the median income for a family was $48,977. Males had a median income of $31,324 versus $21,524 for females. The per capita income for the village was $19,527. About 5.9% of families and 5.8% of the population were below the poverty line, including 2.7% of those under age 18 and 10.0% of those age 65 or over.

=== 2010 census ===
As of the census of 2010, there were 1,529 people, 651 households, and 493 families residing in the village. The population density was 1,274.17 inhabitants per square mile (491.96/km^{2}). There were 705 housing units at an average density of 587.5 per square mile (226.8/km^{2}). The racial makeup of the village was 97.4% White, 0.3% Black, 0.1% Native American, 0.0% Pacific Islander, 0.5% from other races, and 1.8% from two or more races. Hispanic or Latino people of any race were 0.3% of the population.

There were 651 households, of which 27.8% had children under the age of 18 living with them, 44.2% were married couples living together, 15.5% had a female householder with no husband present, and 35.0% were non-families. 30.4% of all households were made up of individuals, and 12.3% had someone living alone who was 65 years of age or older. The average household size was 2.35 and the average family size was 2.88.

In the village, the population was spread out, with 28.0% under the age of 19, 4.8% from 20 to 24, 24.9% from 25 to 44, 25.8% from 45 to 64, and 16.7% who were 65 years of age or older. The median age was 39 years. For every 100 females there were 83.6 males. For every 100 females age 18 and over, there were 84.7 males.

== Historic structures ==
Dresden has the following historic structures of note:

- The Union School (1882)
- The Triple Locks of the Ohio and Erie Canal side cut canal
- The Episcopal Church, built by George Willison Adams in 1852
- The historic 1914 metal link suspension bridge across the Muskingum River

== Education ==
Dresden is located in the Tri-Valley Local School District, and is home to Dresden Elementary School, Tri-Valley Middle School, and Tri-Valley High School.

Dresden is served by a branch of the Muskingum County Library System.

== Notable people ==
- George Willison Adams, industrialist and president of the Northern Pacific Railway
