= Ohio State Route 379 =

State highway in southeastern Ohio, US

State Route 379

Route information
- Maintained by ODOT
- Length: 14.73 mi (23.71 km)
- Existed: 1935–present

Major junctions
- South end: SR 78 in Summerfield
- North end: SR 147 in Batesville

Location
- Country: United States
- State: Ohio
- Counties: Monroe, Belmont

Highway system
- Ohio State Highway System; Interstate; US; State; Scenic
← SR 378	→ SR 380

State Route 379 (SR 379, OH 379) is a north–south state highway located in the southeastern quadrant of the U.S. state of Ohio. The highway runs from its southern terminus at a T-intersection with State Route 78 nearly 3.25 miles (5.23 km) northeast of Summerfield to its northern terminus at a Y-intersection with State Route 147 about 3.75 miles (6.04 km) northeast of Batesville on the Noble-Belmont County Line.

== Route description ==
Along its path, State Route 379 passes through northwestern Monroe County and southwestern Belmont County. This state highway is not included as a part of the National Highway System, a system of routes identified as being most important for the economy, mobility and defense of the nation.

== History ==
The State Route 379 designation was assigned in 1935. Originally, the highway was a spur route, running along its current alignment from its present northern terminus at State Route 147 southwesterly to the northwestern Monroe County hamlet of Calais. Two years later, State Route 379 was extended to the southwest from Calais to end at its present southern terminus at State Route 78.

== Major intersections ==
County	Location	mi	km	Destinations	Notes
Monroe	Seneca Township	0.00	0.00	SR 78	
Belmont–Noble county line	Somerset–Beaver township line	14.73	23.71	SR 147 – Barnesville, Sarahsville	
1.000 mi = 1.609 km; 1.000 km = 0.621 mi
