= Frederick Kindleberger Stone House and Barn =

Historic house in Ohio, United States

- U.S. National Register of Historic Places
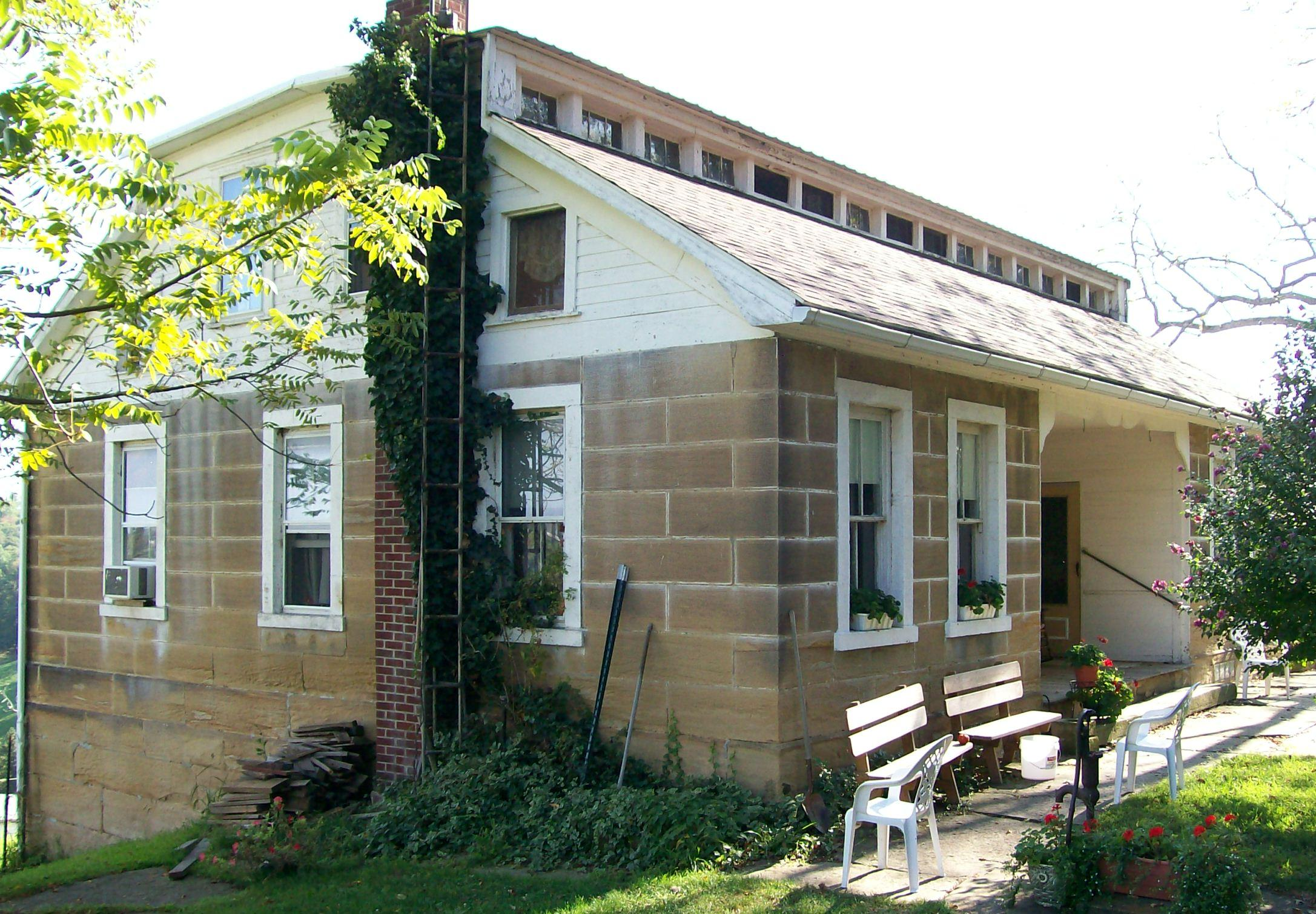
- Front of the house

- Location within Ohio Location within the United States
- Location: Off State Route 556 northwest of Clarington, Ohio
- Coordinates: 39°49′50″N 80°54′21″W
- Area: 5 acres (2.0 ha)
- Built: 1873
- Architect: Frederick Kindleberger
- NRHP reference No.: 80003163
- Added to NRHP: February 8, 1980

The Frederick Kindleberger Stone House and Barn is a historic farmstead in the rural southeastern region of the U.S. state of Ohio. Located near the village of Clarington in Monroe County, the complex is distinguished by its heavy masonry architecture, and it has been named a historic site.

Born in Bavaria in 1835, Frederick Kindleberger emigrated to Monroe County and became one of Switzerland Township's larger landholders, owning a farm that eventually surpassed 200 acres (81 ha). In this rural area, most construction employed lighter materials; barns, for example, were virtually all frame structures, and the occasional exceptions were log structures. As a stonemason, Kindleberger decided to construct his farmstead in the medium to which he was accustomed: the house and barn are constructed of sandstone with slate roofs, and only occasional elements are fashioned of wood. His house is a one-and-one-half-story building constructed in the shape of the letter "H"; a porch is placed on one end, sheltering a door and window, while two windows overlook the porch roof. On the long sides, a pair of windows is placed at the end of each extension, while the deeply recessed center includes both fenestration and an entrance. At the sides, the roof is steeply pitched, but a line of short windows sits atop each section of the roof, with a nearly flat roofline above the windows.

Kindleberger constructed his house and barn in 1873 and 1883 respectively. Throughout their history, they have been recognized as critical components of the built environment of Monroe County and southeastern Ohio. In 1980, the complex was listed on the National Register of Historic Places, qualifying both because of its architecture and because of its place in local history.
