= Ohio State Route 513 =

State highway in eastern Ohio, US

State Route 513

Route information
- Maintained by ODOT
- Length: 27.26 mi (43.87 km)
- Existed: 1937–present

Major junctions
- South end: SR 146 in Summerfield
- I-70 / US 40 near Fairview
- North end: US 22 near Fairview

Location
- Country: United States
- State: Ohio
- Counties: Noble, Guernsey

Highway system
- Ohio State Highway System; Interstate; US; State; Scenic
← SR 512	→ SR 514

State Route 513 (SR 513) is a north–south state highway in the eastern portion of Ohio, a U.S. state. The southern terminus of State Route 513 is at State Route 146 in Summerfield. Its northern terminus is at a T-intersection with U.S. Route 22 approximately 11 miles (18 km) northwest of Fairview.

== Route description ==
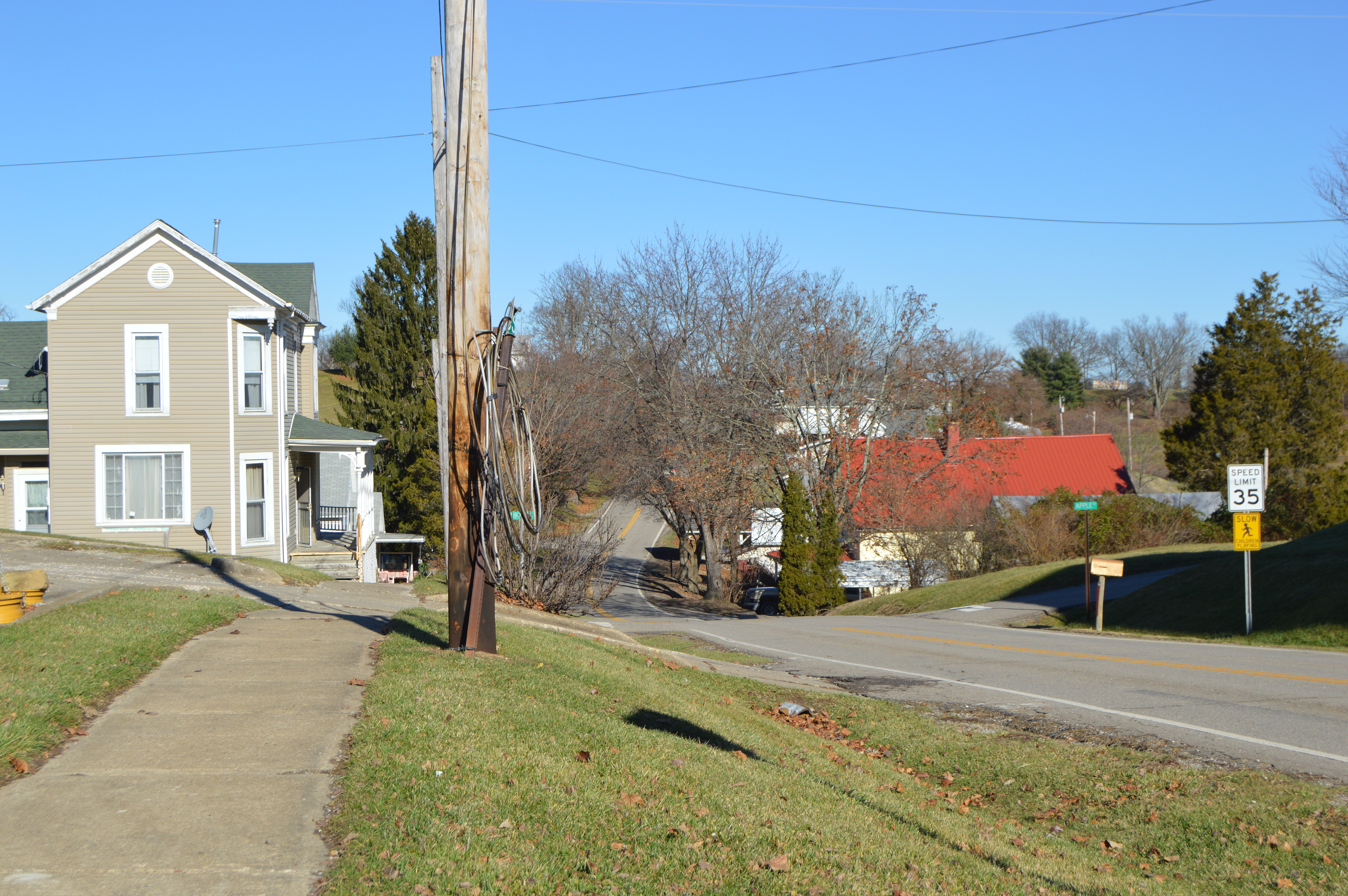
Immediately north of the southern terminus in Summerfield

This state highway passes through the northeastern quadrant of Noble County and the eastern portion of Guernsey County. State Route 513 is not included as a part of the National Highway System.

== History ==
State Route 513 first appeared in 1937 along the alignment that it currently follows between State Route 146 and U.S. Route 22. It has not experienced any major changes in its routing since its inception.

== Major intersections ==
County	Location	mi	km	Destinations	Notes
Noble	Summerfield	0.00	0.00	SR 146 (Cross Street / Main Street) – Sarahsville	
Noble	Batesville	9.38	15.10	SR 147 west – Sarahsville	Southern end of SR 147 concurrency
Noble	Batesville	9.46	15.22	SR 147 east – Barnesville	Northern end of SR 147 concurrency
Guernsey	Quaker City	14.34	23.08	SR 265 (Leatherwood Road)	
Guernsey	Oxford Township	21.16	34.05	I-70 / US 40 – Columbus, Wheeling	Exit 193 (I-70)
Guernsey	Madison Township	27.26	43.87	US 22 – Cambridge, Cadiz, Salt Fork State Park	
1.000 mi = 1.609 km; 1.000 km = 0.621 mi: Concurrency terminus
