= Switzerland Township, Monroe County, Ohio =

Township in Ohio, US

Switzerland Township
- Civil township
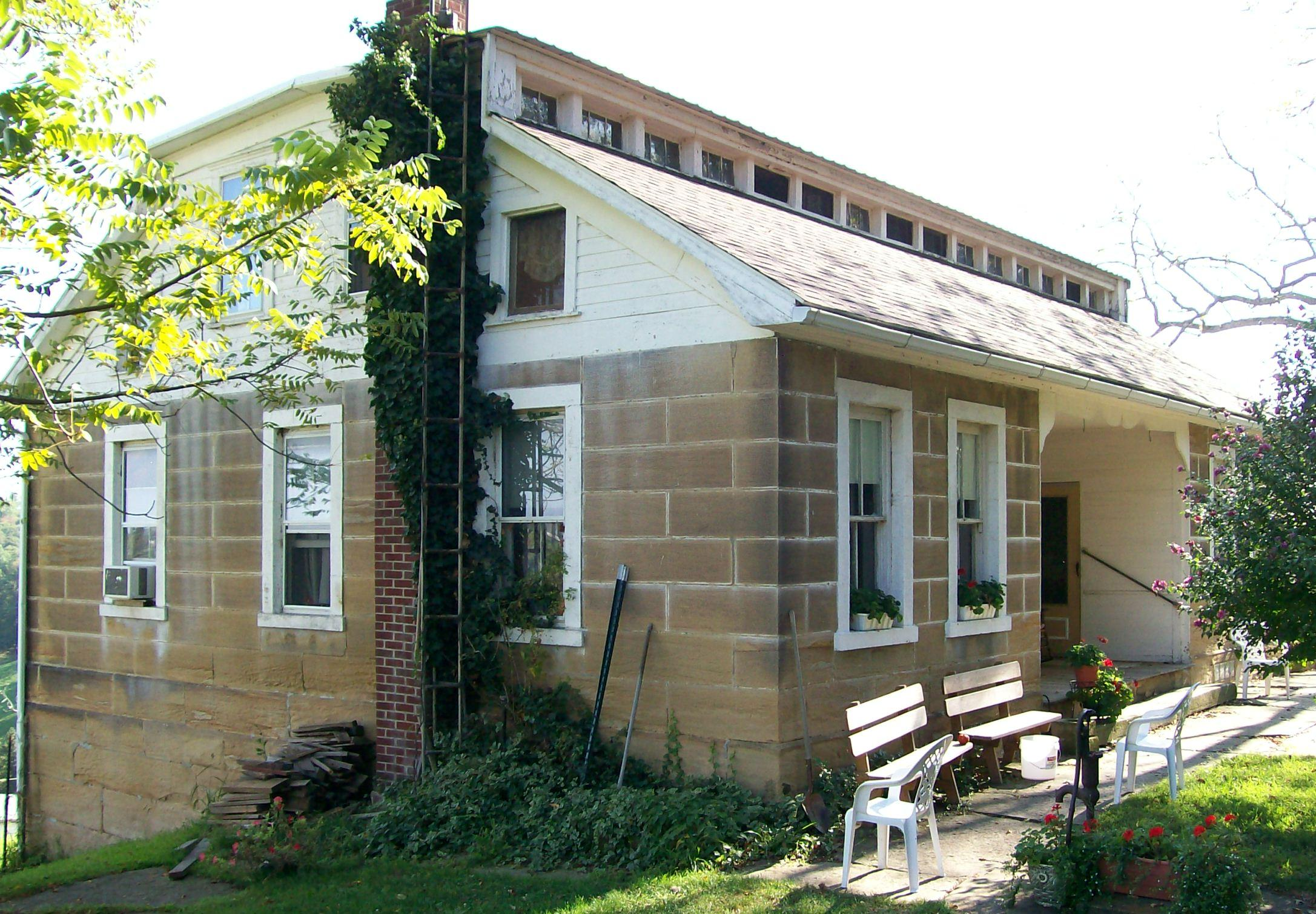
- The Frederick Kindleberger Stone House on State Route 556

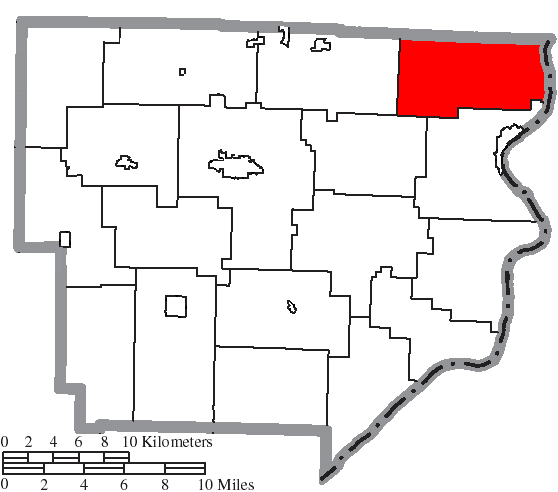
- Location of Switzerland Township in Monroe County
- Coordinates: 39°49′38″N 80°53′26″W
- Country: United States
- State: Ohio
- County: Monroe

Area
  - Total: 27.3 sq mi (70.8 km^{2})
  - Land: 27.2 sq mi (70.4 km^{2})
  - Water: 0.15 sq mi (0.4 km^{2})
- Elevation: 1,270 ft (387 m)

Population (2020)
  - Total: 462
  - Density: 17.0/sq mi (6.56/km^{2})
- Time zone: UTC-5 (Eastern (EST))
  - Summer (DST): UTC-4 (EDT)
- FIPS code: 39-75945
- GNIS feature ID: 1086661

Switzerland Township is one of the eighteen townships of Monroe County, Ohio, United States. As of the 2020 census, the population was 462.

== Geography ==
Located in the northeastern corner of the county along the Ohio River, it borders the following townships:

- York Township, Belmont County - north
- Salem Township - south
- Adams Township - southwest
- Sunsbury Township - west
- Washington Township, Belmont County - northwest

Marshall County, West Virginia lies across the Ohio River to the east.

No municipalities are located in Switzerland Township.

== Name and history ==
It is the only Switzerland Township statewide.

== Government ==
The township is governed by a three-member board of trustees, who are elected in November of odd-numbered years to a four-year term beginning on the following January 1. Two are elected in the year after the presidential election and one is elected in the year before it. There is also an elected township fiscal officer, who serves a four-year term beginning on April 1 of the year after the election, which is held in November of the year before the presidential election. Vacancies in the fiscal officership or on the board of trustees are filled by the remaining trustees.
