= Miltonsburg, Ohio =

- Village
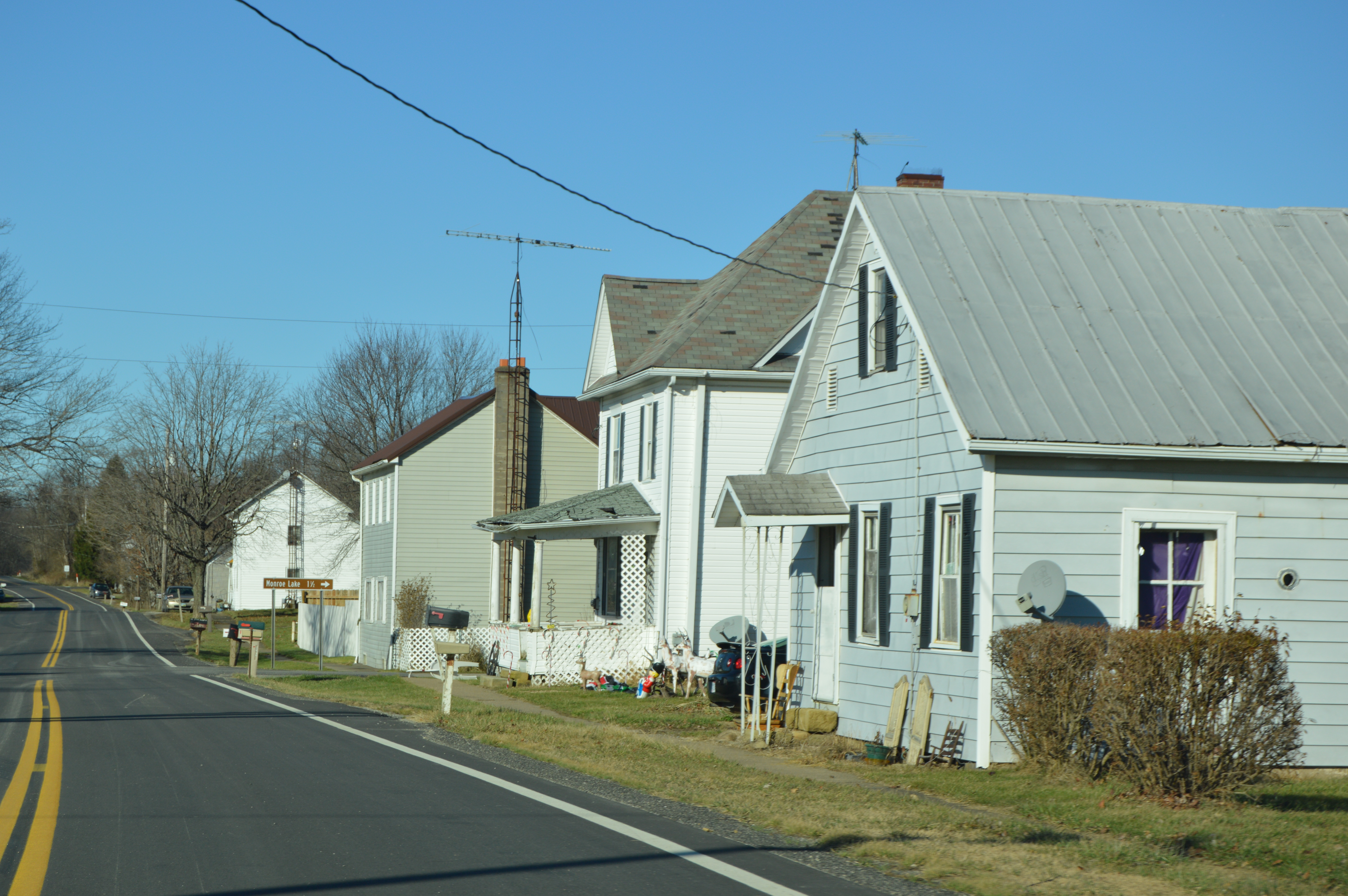
- Along Main Street

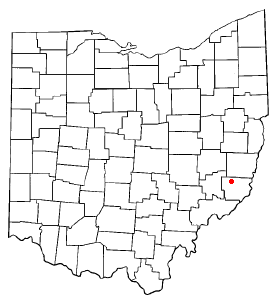
- Location of Miltonsburg, Ohio

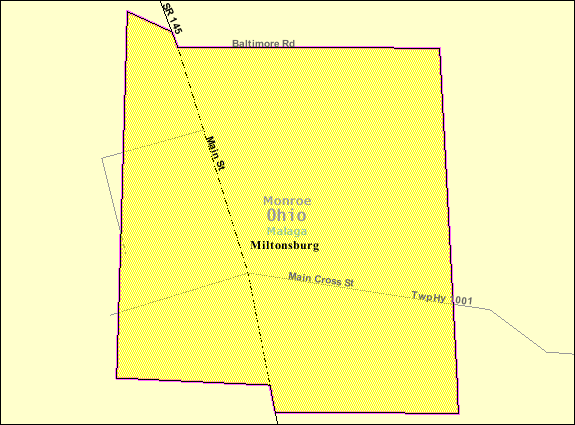
- Detailed map of Miltonsburg
- Coordinates: 39°49′53″N 81°09′53″W
- Country: United States
- State: Ohio
- County: Monroe
- Township: Malaga

Area
  - Total: 0.073 sq mi (0.19 km^{2})
  - Land: 0.073 sq mi (0.19 km^{2})
  - Water: 0 sq mi (0.00 km^{2})
- Elevation: 1,293 ft (394 m)

Population (2020)
  - Total: 42
  - Density: 577.6/sq mi (223.03/km^{2})
- Time zone: UTC-5 (Eastern (EST))
  - Summer (DST): UTC-4 (EDT)
- FIPS code: 39-50722
- GNIS feature ID: 2399368

Miltonsburg is a village in Monroe County, Ohio, United States. The population was 42 at the 2020 census. Miltonsburg was named after Milton Pierson, son of Ohio pioneer David Pierson. David Pierson named Clarington, Ohio after his daughter Clarinda.

== Geography ==
According to the United States Census Bureau, the village has a total area of 0.07 square miles (0.18 km^{2}), all of it land.

== Demographics ==
Historical population
Census	Pop.	Note	%±
1850	145		—
1870	176		—
1880	152		−13.6%
1890	123		−19.1%
1900	130		5.7%
1910	92		−29.2%
1920	84		−8.7%
1930	69		−17.9%
1940	86		24.6%
1950	100		16.3%
1960	116		16.0%
1970	68		−41.4%
1980	109		60.3%
1990	56		−48.6%
2000	29		−48.2%
2010	43		48.3%
2020	42		−2.3%
U.S. Decennial Census

=== 2010 census ===
As of the census of 2010, there were 43 people, 19 households, and 12 families living in the village. The population density was 614.3 inhabitants per square mile (237.2/km^{2}). There were 25 housing units at an average density of 357.1 per square mile (137.9/km^{2}). The racial makeup of the village was 100.0% White.

There were 19 households, of which 36.8% had children under the age of 18 living with them, 47.4% were married couples living together, 10.5% had a female householder with no husband present, 5.3% had a male householder with no wife present, and 36.8% were non-families. 31.6% of all households were made up of individuals. The average household size was 2.26 and the average family size was 2.67.

The median age in the village was 42.8 years. 20.9% of residents were under the age of 18; 4.7% were between the ages of 18 and 24; 35% were from 25 to 44; 28% were from 45 to 64; and 11.6% were 65 years of age or older. The gender makeup of the village was 55.8% male and 44.2% female.

=== 2000 census ===
As of the census of 2000, there were 29 people, 11 households, and 8 families living in the village. The population density was 376.3 inhabitants per square mile (145.3/km^{2}). There were 11 housing units at an average density of 142.7 per square mile (55.1/km^{2}). The racial makeup of the village was 100.00% White.

There were 11 households, out of which 36.4% had children under the age of 18 living with them, 72.7% were married couples living together, and 18.2% were non-families. 18.2% of all households were made up of individuals, and 18.2% had someone living alone who was 65 years of age or older. The average household size was 2.64 and the average family size was 2.89.

In the village, the population was spread out, with 24.1% under the age of 18, 3.4% from 18 to 24, 37.9% from 25 to 44, 20.7% from 45 to 64, and 13.8% who were 65 years of age or older. The median age was 37 years. For every 100 females there were 107.1 males. For every 100 females age 18 and over, there were 100.0 males.

The median income for a household in the village was $43,750, and the median income for a family was $43,750. Males had a median income of $39,583 versus $0 for females. The per capita income for the village was $13,605. None of the population is below the poverty line.
