= Marion Township, Noble County, Ohio =

Township in Ohio, US

- Township
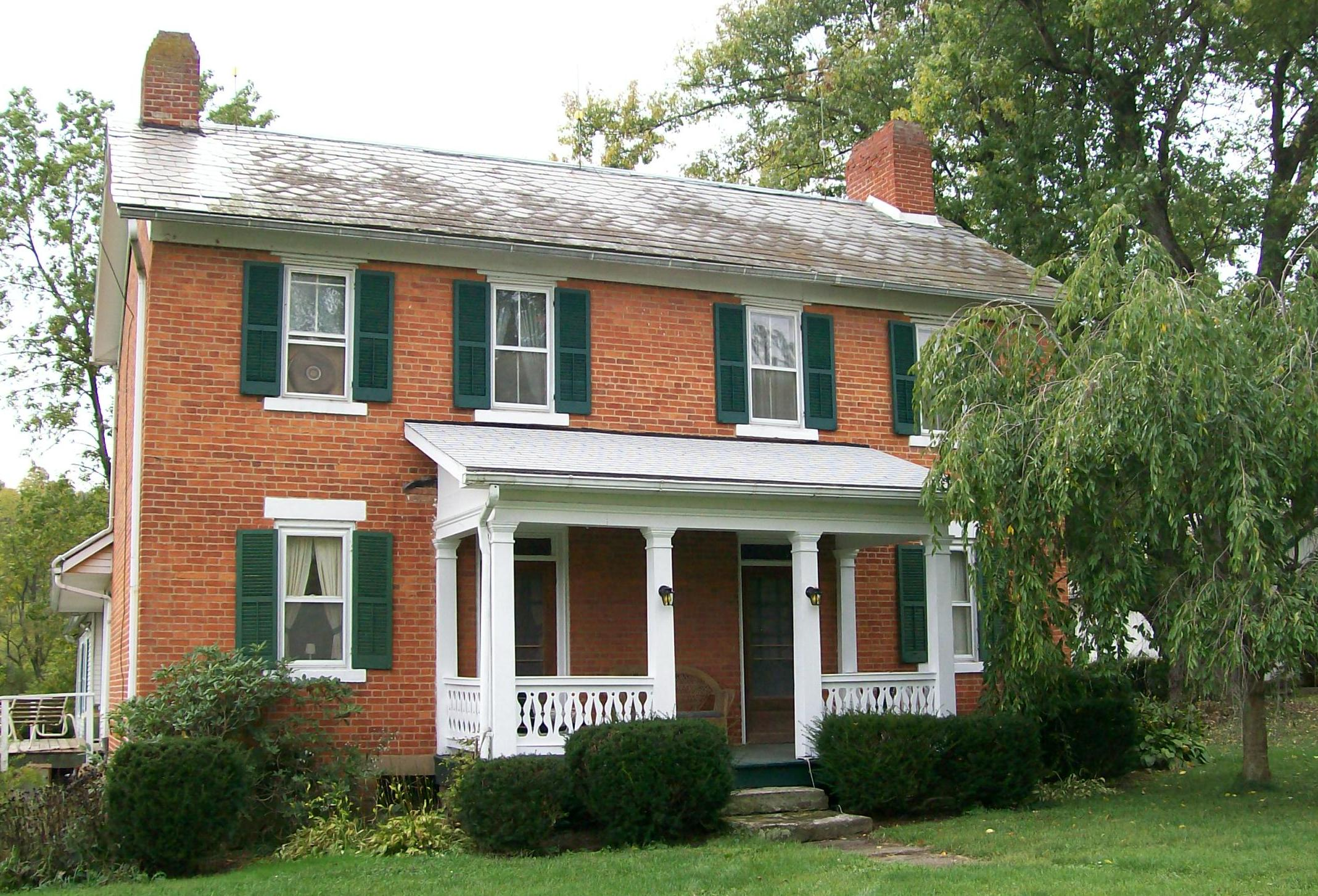
- Home of Samuel Danford, a Marion Township pioneer

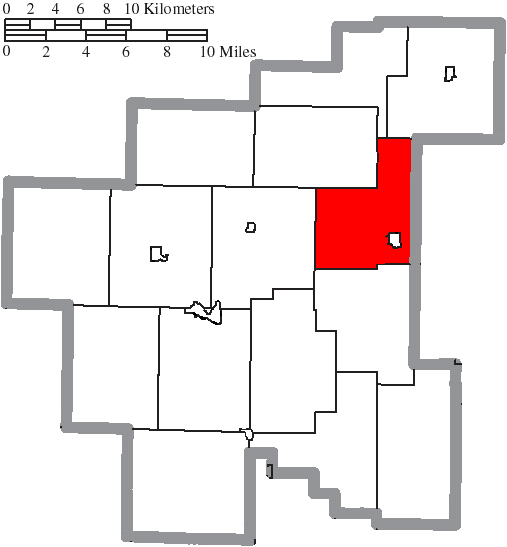
- Location of Marion Township in Noble County
- Coordinates: 39°48′39″N 81°21′21″W
- Country: United States
- State: Ohio
- County: Noble

Area
  - Total: 24.3 sq mi (62.9 km^{2})
  - Land: 24.3 sq mi (62.9 km^{2})
  - Water: 0 sq mi (0.0 km^{2})
- Elevation: 1,079 ft (329 m)

Population (2020)
  - Total: 618
  - Density: 25.4/sq mi (9.83/km^{2})
- Time zone: UTC-5 (Eastern (EST))
  - Summer (DST): UTC-4 (EDT)
- FIPS code: 39-47810
- GNIS feature ID: 1086747

Marion Township is one of the fifteen townships of Noble County, Ohio, United States. The 2020 census found 618 people in the township.

== Geography ==
Located in the eastern part of the county, it borders the following townships:

- Wayne Township - north
- Beaver Township - northeast
- Seneca Township, Monroe County - east
- Franklin Township, Monroe County - southeast corner
- Stock Township - south
- Center Township - west
- Seneca Township - northwest

The village of Summerfield, the second largest village in Noble County, is located in southwestern Marion Township.

== Name and history ==
It is one of twelve Marion Townships statewide.

== Government ==
The township is governed by a three-member board of trustees, who are elected in November of odd-numbered years to a four-year term beginning on the following January 1. Two are elected in the year after the presidential election and one is elected in the year before it. There is also an elected township fiscal officer, who serves a four-year term beginning on April 1 of the year after the election, which is held in November of the year before the presidential election. Vacancies in the fiscal officership or on the board of trustees are filled by the remaining trustees.
