= Wayne Township, Belmont County, Ohio =

Township in Ohio, US

- Township
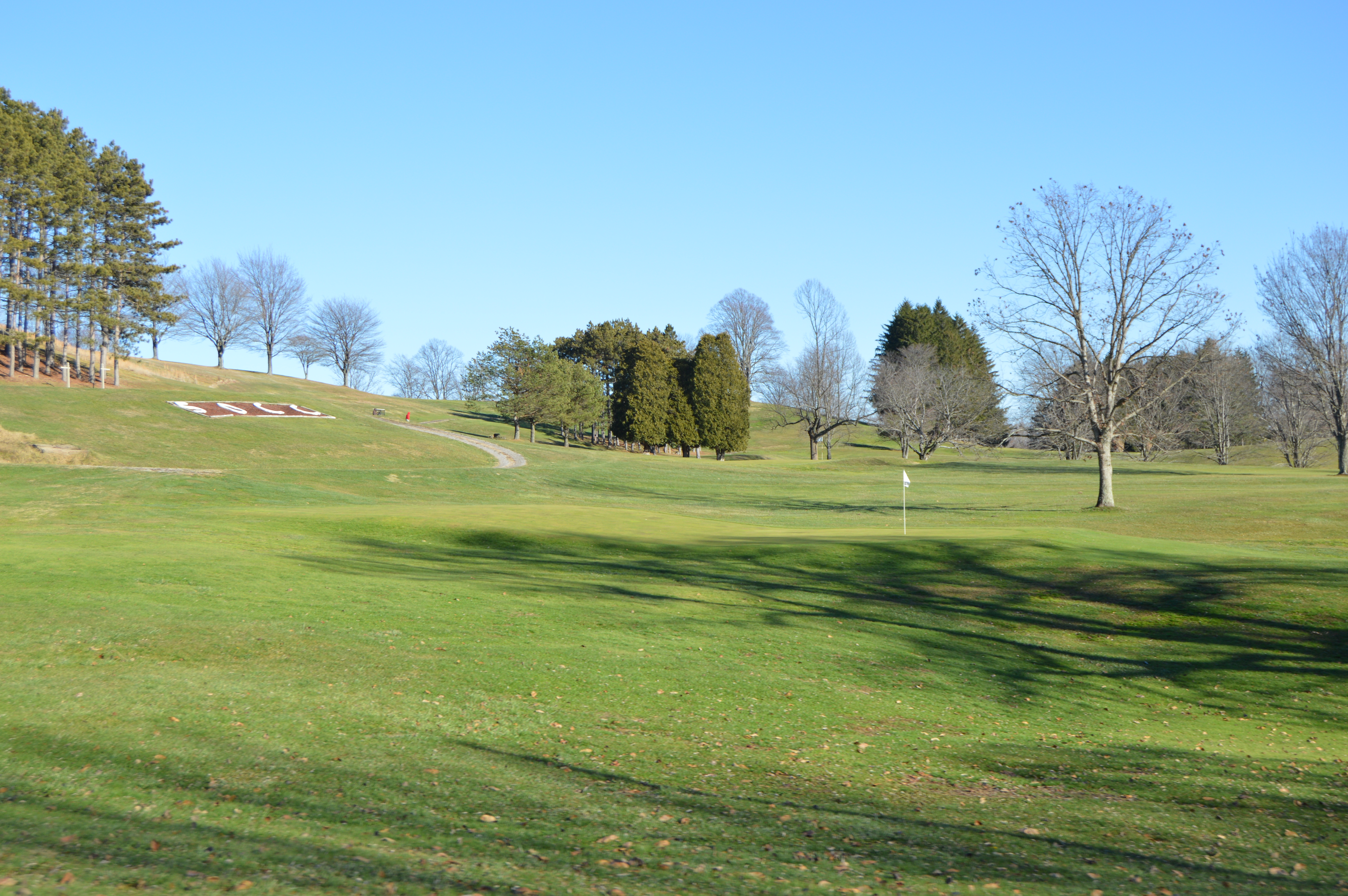
- Switzerland of Ohio Country Club, just west of Wilson

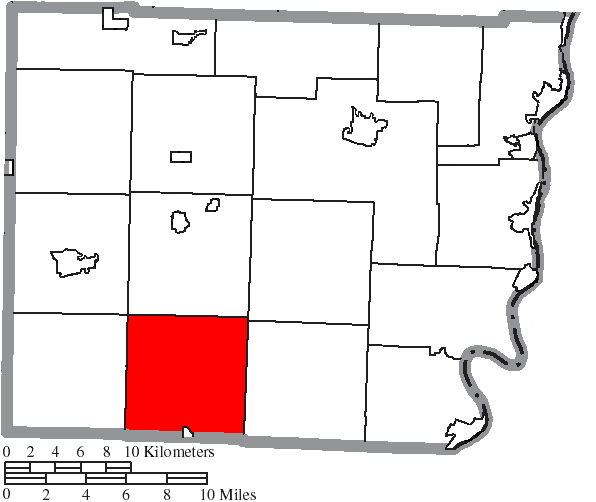
- Location of Wayne Township in Belmont County
- Coordinates: 39°54′1″N 81°4′16″W
- Country: United States
- State: Ohio
- County: Belmont

Area
  - Total: 35.6 sq mi (92.2 km^{2})
  - Land: 35.2 sq mi (91.2 km^{2})
  - Water: 0.39 sq mi (1.0 km^{2})
- Elevation: 1,066 ft (325 m)

Population (2020)
  - Total: 703
  - Density: 20.0/sq mi (7.71/km^{2})
- Time zone: UTC-5 (Eastern (EST))
  - Summer (DST): UTC-4 (EDT)
- FIPS code: 39-82068
- GNIS feature ID: 1085789

Wayne Township is one of the sixteen townships of Belmont County, Ohio, United States. The 2020 census found 703 people in the township.

== Geography ==
Located in the southern part of the county, it borders the following townships:

- Goshen Township - north
- Smith Township - northeast
- Washington Township - east
- Sunsbury Township, Monroe County - southeast
- Malaga Township, Monroe County - southwest
- Somerset Township - west
- Warren Township - northwest corner

Part of the village of Wilson is located in southern Wayne Township.

== Name and history ==
Named for Anthony Wayne, it is one of twenty Wayne Townships statewide.

In 1833, several gristmills and saw mills were operating in Wayne Township, powered by the waters of Captina Creek.

== Government ==
The township is governed by a three-member board of trustees, who are elected in November of odd-numbered years to a four-year term beginning on the following January 1. Two are elected in the year after the presidential election and one is elected in the year before it. There is also an elected township fiscal officer, who serves a four-year term beginning on April 1 of the year after the election, which is held in November of the year before the presidential election. Vacancies in the fiscal officership or on the board of trustees are filled by the remaining trustees.
