= Cameron, Ohio =

Unincorporated community in Ohio, U.S.

Coordinates: 39°46′01″N 80°56′41″W

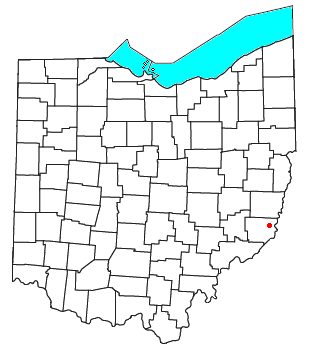
Location of Cameron, Ohio

Cameron is an unincorporated community in eastern Adams Township, Monroe County, Ohio, United States. It has a post office with the ZIP code 43914. It lies along State Route 78.

Cameron was originally called Jamestown, and under the latter name was platted in 1838. The present name is a transfer from Cameron, West Virginia.
