= Sunsbury Township, Monroe County, Ohio =

Township in Ohio, US

- Township
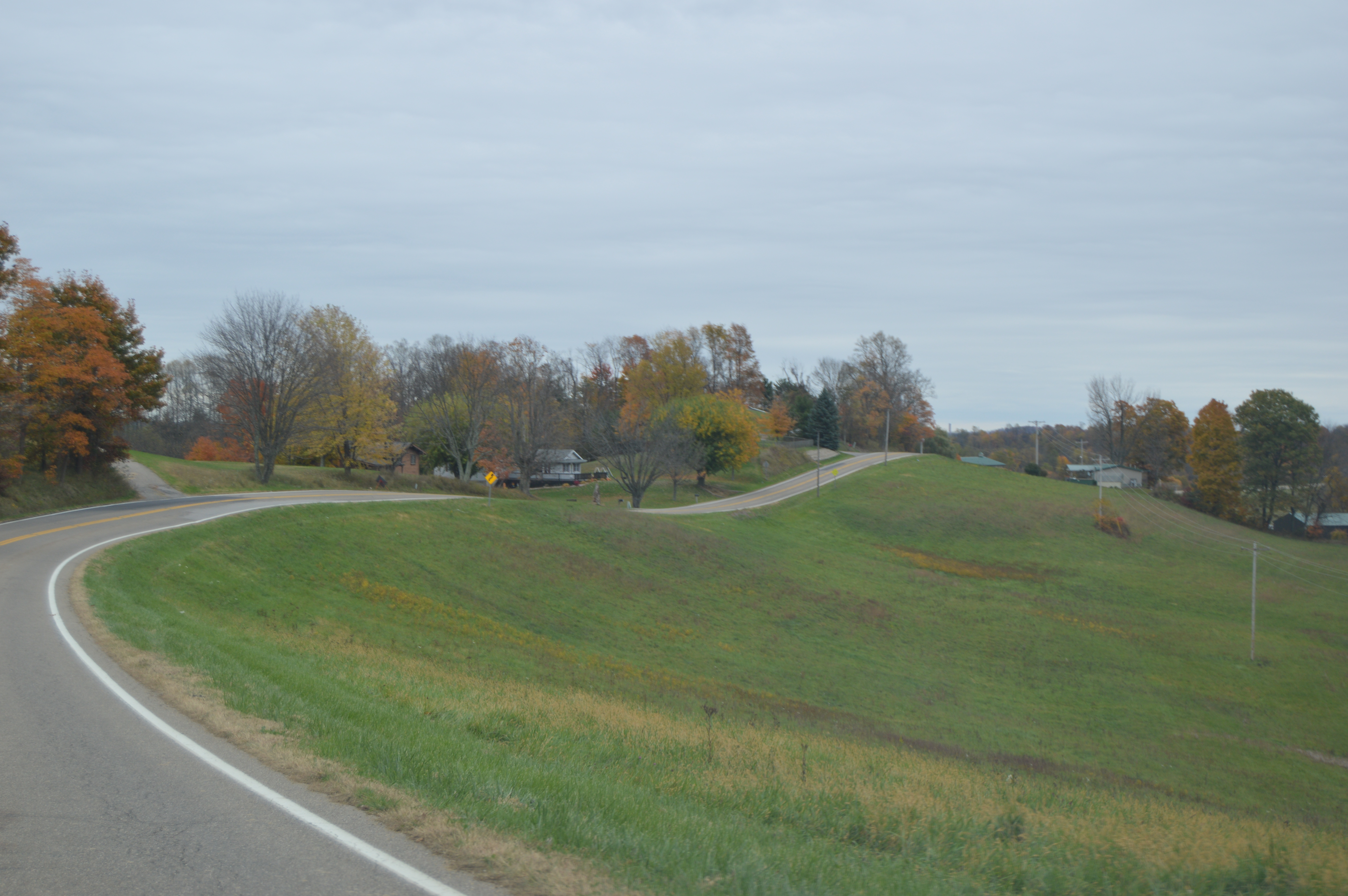
- East of Beallsville on State Route 556

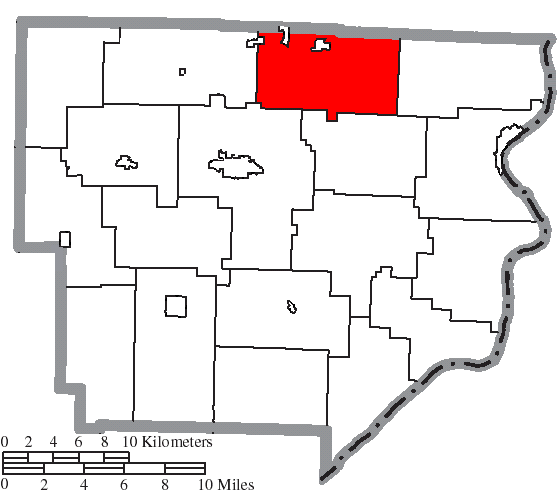
- Location of Sunsbury Township in Monroe County
- Coordinates: 39°50′41″N 81°2′16″W
- Country: United States
- State: Ohio
- County: Monroe

Area
  - Total: 28.4 sq mi (73.6 km^{2})
  - Land: 28.4 sq mi (73.6 km^{2})
  - Water: 0 sq mi (0.0 km^{2})
- Elevation: 1,201 ft (366 m)

Population (2020)
  - Total: 1,267
  - Density: 44.6/sq mi (17.2/km^{2})
- Time zone: UTC-5 (Eastern (EST))
  - Summer (DST): UTC-4 (EDT)
- FIPS code: 39-75686
- GNIS feature ID: 1086660

Sunsbury Township is one of the eighteen townships of Monroe County, Ohio, United States. As of the 2020 census, the population was 1,267.

== Geography ==
Located in the northern part of the county, it borders the following townships:

- Washington Township, Belmont County - northeast
- Switzerland Township - east
- Adams Township - south
- Center Township - southwest
- Malaga Township - west
- Wayne Township, Belmont County - northwest

Three villages are located in Sunsbury Township:

- Beallsville, in the north
- Part of Jerusalem, in the northwest, along the border with Malaga Township
- Part of Wilson, in the northwest, along the border with Belmont County

== Name and history ==
It is the only Sunsbury Township statewide.

== Government ==
The township is governed by a three-member board of trustees, who are elected in November of odd-numbered years to a four-year term beginning on the following January 1. Two are elected in the year after the presidential election and one is elected in the year before it. There is also an elected township fiscal officer, who serves a four-year term beginning on April 1 of the year after the election, which is held in November of the year before the presidential election. Vacancies in the fiscal officership or on the board of trustees are filled by the remaining trustees.
