= Margaret Keenan Harrais =

U.S. commissioner and magistrate (1872–1964)

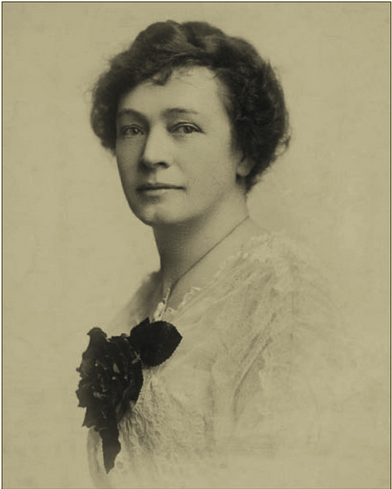
- WCTU portrait photo (ca. 1915)
- Born: Sarah Margaret Keenan; September 23, 1872; Batesville, Ohio, U.S.
- Died: April 26, 1964 (aged 91); Glennallen, Alaska, U.S.
- Education: Valparaiso University
- Occupations: educator; suffragist; activist; United States Commissioner; Deputy magistrate
- Organization: Woman's Christian Temperance Union
- Spouse: Martin Luther Harrais (m. 1920; died 1936)

Margaret Keenan Harrais (1872–1964) was an American educator, suffragist, temperance reformer, and government official. During her 48 years in Alaska, while a territory and after statehood, she devoted herself to community and public service. In Fairbanks, she was the first woman superintendent of schools. For 18 years, she was a member of the territorial board of education. She served as President of the Alaska Woman's Christian Temperance Union (WCTU) while living in McCarthy, and was also chair for Alaska of the Women's National Committee for Law Enforcement. In widowhood, she served as a United States Commissioner at Valdez, and after Alaska became a state, Harrais became a deputy magistrate.

== Early life and education ==
Sarah Margaret Keenan was born at Batesville, Ohio, September 23, 1872, of Scotch-Irish ancestry. Her parents were Thomas Keenan (1833–1888) and Martha Maria (Reed) Keenan (1835–1896). Margaret's siblings were Emma, Emmett, Ella, James, Martha, and Thomas.

She came from a temperance family, and was trained from childhood in temperance work by her father.

She was educated at Northern Indiana Normal School, Valparaiso, Indiana, and at Valparaiso University (B.S., 1906).

== Career ==
=== Idaho ===
Harrais began teaching in the rural schools of Ohio at the age of sixteen, after which she acted as principal of public schools in various parts of Idaho (1897–1911). While teaching in Idaho, she served as vice-president of the WCTU of South Idaho.

=== Alaska ===
Harrais petitioned for suffrage in the Alaska Territory in 1913.

The following year, at the age of 42, she removed to Alaska, becoming principal of schools at Skagway, serving in that position for two years, before moving to Fairbanks where she was city superintendent of schools for another two years. Her students included U.S. Senator E. L. Bartlett and Governor of Alaska, William A. Egan.

She lost two positions as superintendent of schools because of her temperance activities in wet communities.

In 1916, Harrais was also one of the women who directed the territory-wide campaign for Prohibition, and one of two women who organized and "put across" the plebiscite of that year which made Alaska dry. At the same time, she was elected vice-president at large of the Alaska Territorial WCTU, and later went to California still holding that position.

During the period of 1916 to 1919, Harrais, known at the time as "Margaret Kennan, spinster", served as school superintendent in Fairbanks. During World War I, she directed the US$10,000 war bond drive in which each of the 200 children enrolled in school purchased a US$50 war bond. Parents were asked not to help their children purchase the bonds. Harrais set up an employment office at school and assisted the children in finding spare time jobs. She edited the unusual "Women's Edition" of the Fairbanks Daily News-Miner on Thanksgiving eve, 1917, which enlisted the services of 55 women. The newspaper sparked to success a benefit which raised nearly US$4,000 in less than one month to sponsor six beds in the American Ambulance Hospital near Paris. Only one bed, at US$600, had been anticipated for all of Alaska, but Fairbanks alone had paid for six.

It was during her Fairbanks stay that Margaret met Martin Luther Harrais (1865–1936), a University of Washington graduate and an early day prospector of the neighboring mining camp city of Chena. Mr. Harrais, who had made and lost several large fortunes in gold, was keenly interested in statehood and was a candidate in the election of 1912 which reelected Judge James Wickersham as Delegate to Congress.

=== California ===
In San Diego, California, on October 25, 1920, she married Mr. Harrais.

While a resident of California, she served as national publicity woman for the National WCTU (1920–24). She helped organize the campaign that secured California's enforcement code in 1922, and furnished the copy and secured the publication of 50,000 columns of publicity for the same.

=== Return to Alaska ===
Mr. Harrais transferred his mining interests to the McCarthy-Chitina mining district, and in 1924, she returned to Alaska, the couple residing in McCarthy, Alaska where her husband directed his mining interests. She was instrumental in securing the passage of an antitobacco law, an antipool-hall law for minors, the Alaska dry law, and an educational code. In the spring of 1925, she was active in the defeat of two campaigns to repeal the existing Alaskan dry law. She became president of the Territorial Union WCTU, in which capacity she was still serving in 1928, with headquarters at McCarthy.

Harrais also served chair for Alaska of the Woman's National Committee for Law Enforcement. In the latter 1920s, she was asked to serve on a 15-member national committee to survey and submit a report on law enforcement for the National Association of Women's Clubs. Her report, written at McCarthy, appeared with such notables of the times as Lucy Whitehead McGill Waterbury Peabody, Evangeline Booth, and Carrie Chapman Catt.

While he prospected, Mrs. Harrais taught at the small McCarthy school. On the eve of the 1929 stock market crash, Mr. Harrais was on the verge of another fortune, this time in copper. The crash not only dashed all hopes for success but with it went their investments and savings in Seattle banks and business buildings. Undaunted the intrepid pair began anew, first near Cordova, then in Valdez where, in 1934, Mr. Harrais accepted an appointment as U.S. Commissioner.

Upon his death in 1936, Mrs. Harrais succeeded him as U.S. Commissioner in Valdez, maintaining an office in the Federal building until it was leveled by fire in the early morning hours of December 14, 1940. Thereafter, the records of the Valdez district were kept in the front room of her home, a shingle with the inscription, "U.S. commissioner" hanging over her doorway. Twice, she was offered the U.S. Commissioner's post in Anchorage, where the court headquarters had moved following the fire, and twice she refused the honor to stay home in Valdez.

In 1941, the 1,080 U.S. Commissioners in other States and the 72 in Alaska were asked to write a report offering suggestions or criticisms of the U.S. commissioner system. Just two submissions were included in the final report, one from a district judge, and one from a U.S. commissioner, Harrais.

With statehood, her duties remained virtually the same under the new title of deputy magistrate at Valdez, retiring in 1962, at the age of 89.

Harrais found time to serve as Democratic territorial committeewoman as well as holding membership in the Woman's Club. In Valdez, she worked as chair of the Valdez Hospital Board and was interested in the El Nathan Children's Home. In her spare time, she devoted herself to mending the mittens, sweaters and socks for the 100 children of the home. After the home closed, and while a member of the Dorcas Club, she turned to knitting afghans for disabled soldiers in veterans hospitals, and by 1962, was working on her 91st afghan.

== Death and legacy ==
Margaret Harrais died at Glennallen, Alaska, April 26, 1964.

In 1936, Mr. Harrais received a patent for his claims to the Darling M. no. 1 through 5 mines. Upon his death, the claims passed to Mrs. Harrais, which she bequeathed to the National WCTU upon her death.

Harrais' papers (ca. 1895–1965), including correspondence, legal documents, manuscripts, clippings, newspaper articles, and photographs are held by the University of Alaska Fairbanks.

== Selected works ==
- Harrais, Margaret, 1947, "Statement of mining claims of Martin Harrais, upper Chitina Valley, Alaska": Alaska Territorial Department of Mines Miscellaneous Report 87-3, 7 p.
- Harrais, Margaret, n.d. "Alaska Periscope". Unpublished and undated manuscript. Harrais Family Papers Collection, Alaska and Polar Regions Collections & Archives, Elmer E. Rasmuson Library, University of Alaska Fairbanks, Fairbanks, AK.
