= Salem Township, Ohio =

Salem Township, Ohio may refer to:

- Salem Township, Auglaize County, Ohio
- Salem Township, Champaign County, Ohio
- Salem Township, Columbiana County, Ohio
- Salem Township, Highland County, Ohio
- Salem Township, Jefferson County, Ohio
- Salem Township, Meigs County, Ohio
- Salem Township, Monroe County, Ohio
- Salem Township, Muskingum County, Ohio
- Salem Township, Ottawa County, Ohio
- Salem Township, Shelby County, Ohio
- Salem Township, Tuscarawas County, Ohio
- Salem Township, Warren County, Ohio
- Salem Township, Washington County, Ohio
- Salem Township, Wyandot County, Ohio
