= Key, Ohio =

Unincorporated community in Ohio, U.S.

Coordinates: 39°58′30″N 80°52′12″W

Key is an unincorporated community in Belmont County, in the U.S. state of Ohio.

== History ==
A post office called Key was established in 1879, and remained in operation until 1933. Key was formerly called Bethel. In addition to the post office Bethel (Key) had a train station, schoolhouse, and church.
