= Adams Township, Monroe County, Ohio =

Township in Ohio, US

- Township
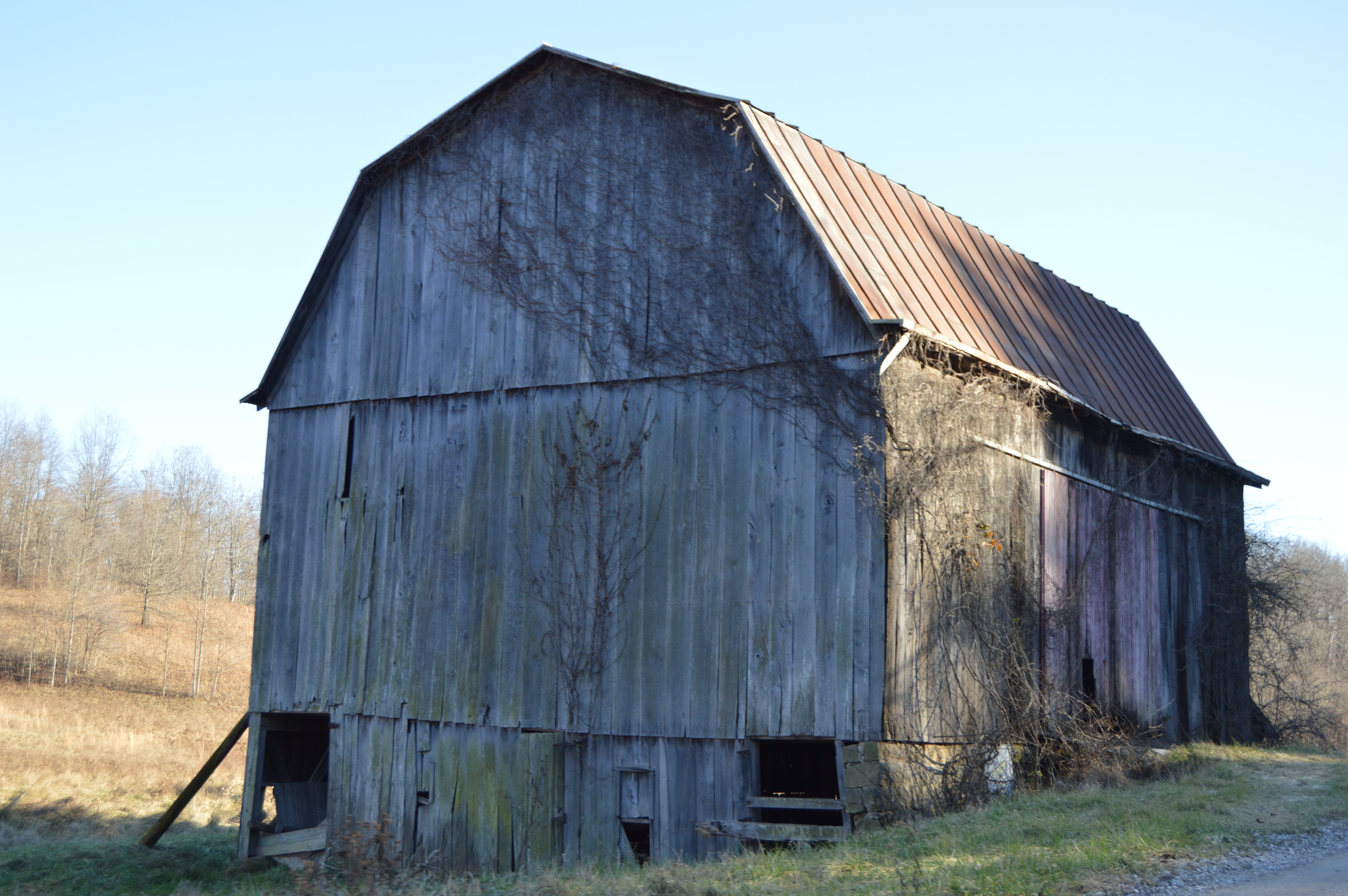
- Bank barn on Altitude-Miller Hill Road

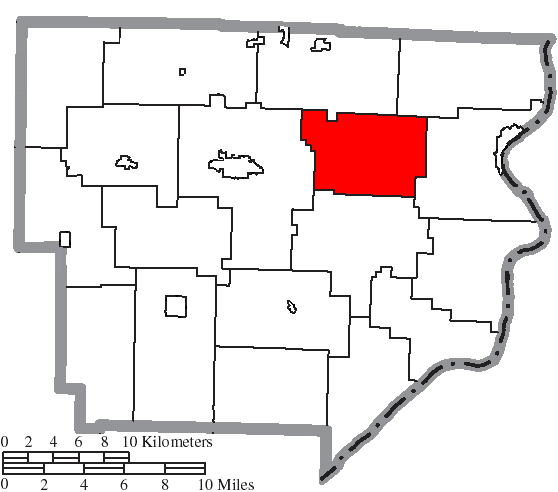
- Location of Adams Township in Monroe County
- Coordinates: 39°46′6″N 80°59′12″W
- Country: United States
- State: Ohio
- County: Monroe

Area
  - Total: 22.5 sq mi (58.2 km^{2})
  - Land: 22.5 sq mi (58.2 km^{2})
  - Water: 0 sq mi (0.0 km^{2})
- Elevation: 748 ft (228 m)

Population (2020)
  - Total: 620
  - Density: 28/sq mi (11/km^{2})
- Time zone: UTC-5 (Eastern (EST))
  - Summer (DST): UTC-4 (EDT)
- FIPS code: 39-00296
- GNIS feature ID: 1086646

Adams Township is one of the eighteen townships of Monroe County, Ohio, United States. The population was 620 at the 2020 census.

== Geography ==
Located in the northeastern part of the county, it borders the following townships:

- Sunsbury Township - north
- Switzerland Township - northeast
- Salem Township - east
- Green Township - south
- Center Township - west

No municipalities are located in Adams Township, although the unincorporated community of Cameron lies in the township's east.

== Name and history ==
It is one of ten Adams Townships statewide.

== Government ==
The township is governed by a three-member board of trustees, who are elected in November of odd-numbered years to a four-year term beginning on the following January 1. Two are elected in the year after the presidential election and one is elected in the year before it. There is also an elected township fiscal officer, who serves a four-year term beginning on April 1 of the year after the election, which is held in November of the year before the presidential election. Vacancies in the fiscal officership or on the board of trustees are filled by the remaining trustees.
