= Warren Township, Belmont County, Ohio =

Township in Ohio, US

- Township
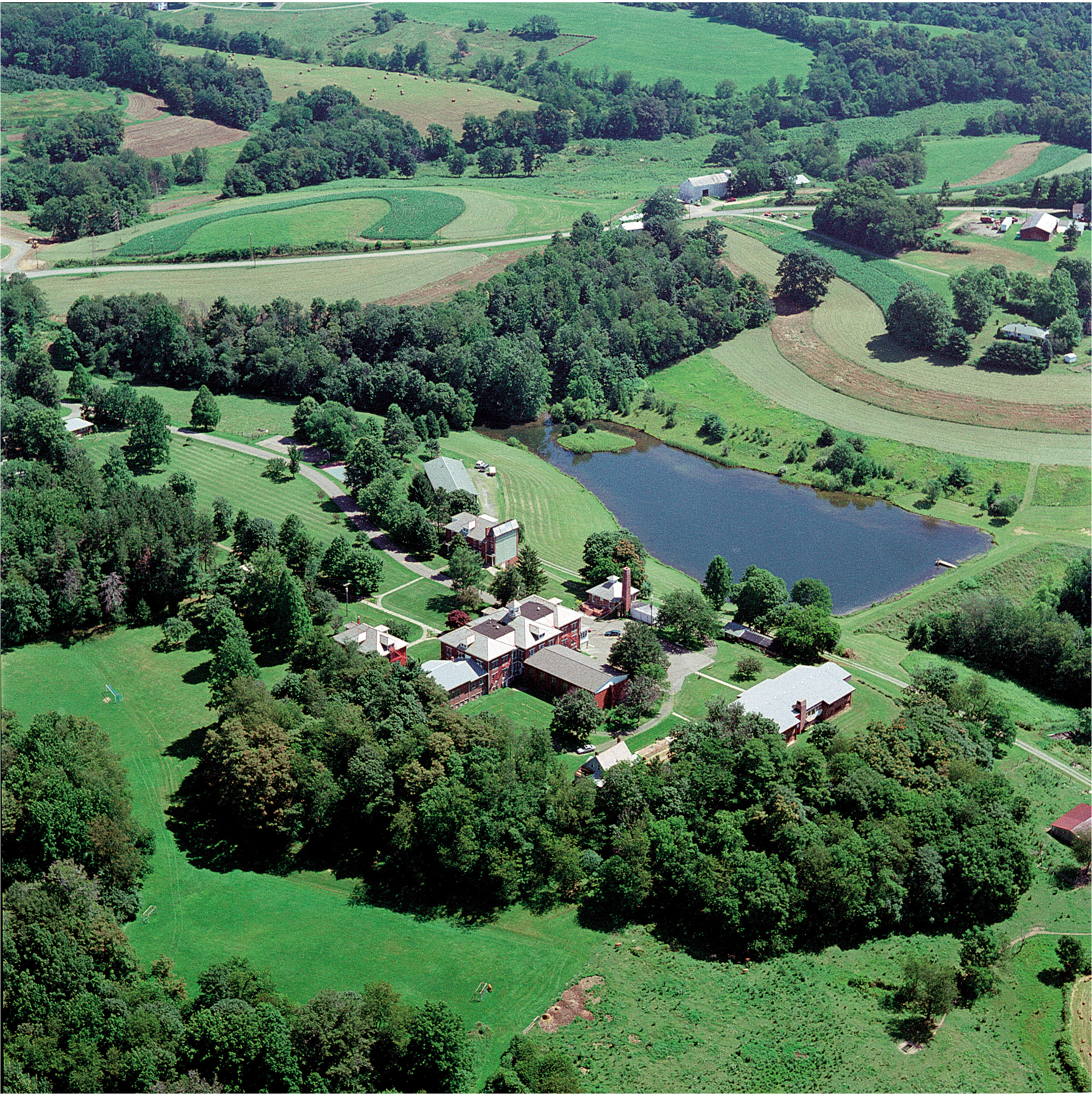
- Aerial view of the Olney Friends School

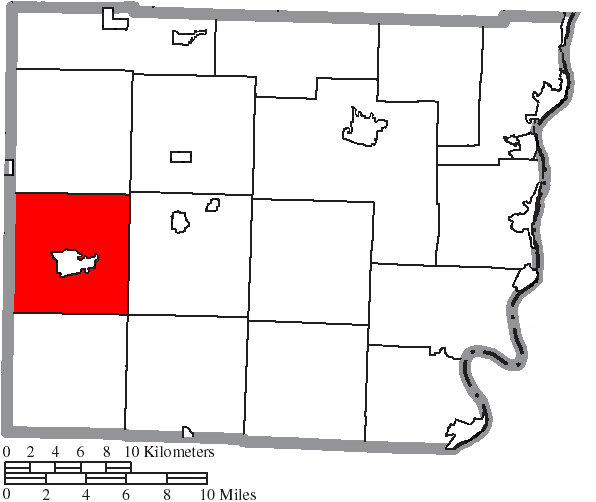
- Location of Warren Township in Belmont County
- Coordinates: 39°59′11″N 81°10′24″W
- Country: United States
- State: Ohio
- County: Belmont

Area
  - Total: 35.3 sq mi (91.3 km^{2})
  - Land: 34.9 sq mi (90.4 km^{2})
  - Water: 0.39 sq mi (1.0 km^{2})
- Elevation: 1,293 ft (394 m)

Population (2020)
  - Total: 5,743
  - Density: 165/sq mi (63.5/km^{2})
- Time zone: UTC-5 (Eastern (EST))
  - Summer (DST): UTC-4 (EDT)
- FIPS code: 39-80864
- GNIS feature ID: 1085787

Warren Township is one of the sixteen townships of Belmont County, Ohio, United States. The 2020 census found 5,743 people in the township.

== Geography ==
Located in the western part of the county, it borders the following townships:

- Kirkwood Township - north
- Goshen Township - east
- Wayne Township - southeast corner
- Somerset Township - south
- Millwood Township, Guernsey County - west
- Oxford Township, Guernsey County - northwest

The village of Barnesville is located in central Warren Township.

== Name and history ==
Warren Township was organized about 1806–1807.

It is one of five Warren Townships statewide.

In 1833, several gristmills and saw mills were being operating in Warren Township, powered by the waters of Captina Creek and the Stillwater River.

== Government ==
The township is governed by a three-member board of trustees, who are elected in November of odd-numbered years to a four-year term beginning on the following January 1. Two are elected in the year after the presidential election and one is elected in the year before it. There is also an elected township fiscal officer, who serves a four-year term beginning on April 1 of the year after the election, which is held in November of the year before the presidential election. Vacancies in the fiscal officership or on the board of trustees are filled by the remaining trustees.

The township's trustees meet in Barnesville.
