= Salem Township, Monroe County, Ohio =

Township in Ohio, US

- Township
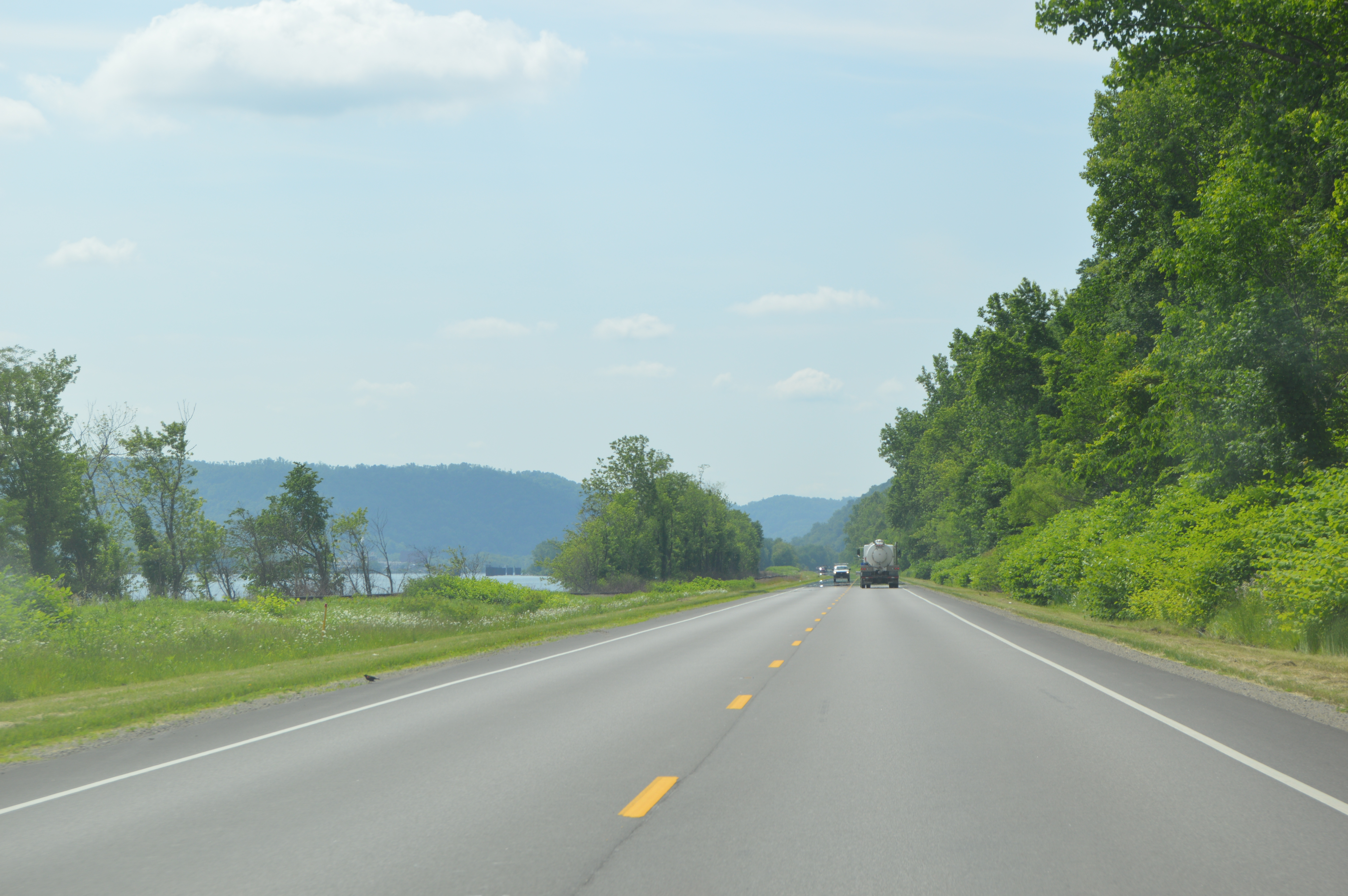
- State Route 7 along the Ohio River

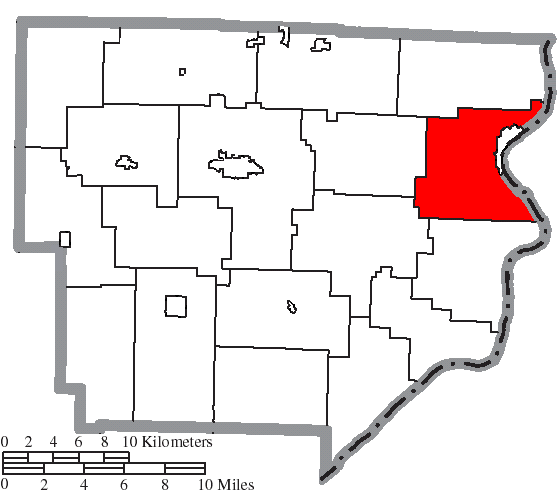
- Location of Salem Township in Monroe County
- Coordinates: 39°46′1″N 80°52′46″W
- Country: United States
- State: Ohio
- County: Monroe

Area
  - Total: 26.4 sq mi (68.5 km^{2})
  - Land: 25.7 sq mi (66.6 km^{2})
  - Water: 0.73 sq mi (1.9 km^{2})
- Elevation: 620 ft (189 m)

Population (2020)
  - Total: 831
  - Density: 32.3/sq mi (12.5/km^{2})
- Time zone: UTC-5 (Eastern (EST))
  - Summer (DST): UTC-4 (EDT)
- FIPS code: 39-69918
- GNIS feature ID: 1086657

Salem Township is one of the eighteen townships of Monroe County, Ohio, United States. As of the 2020 census, the population was 831, including 280 people in the village of Clarington.

== Geography ==
Located in the eastern part of the county along the Ohio River, it borders the following townships:

- Switzerland Township - north
- Ohio Township - south
- Green Township - southwest
- Adams Township - west

Marshall County, West Virginia lies across the Ohio River to the east.

The village of Clarington is located in northeastern Salem Township along the Ohio River.

== Name and history ==
It is one of fourteen Salem Townships statewide.

== Government ==
The township is governed by a three-member board of trustees, who are elected in November of odd-numbered years to a four-year term beginning on the following January 1. Two are elected in the year after the presidential election and one is elected in the year before it. There is also an elected township fiscal officer, who serves a four-year term beginning on April 1 of the year after the election, which is held in November of the year before the presidential election. Vacancies in the fiscal officership or on the board of trustees are filled by the remaining trustees.
