= Malaga Township, Monroe County, Ohio =

Township in Ohio, US

- Township
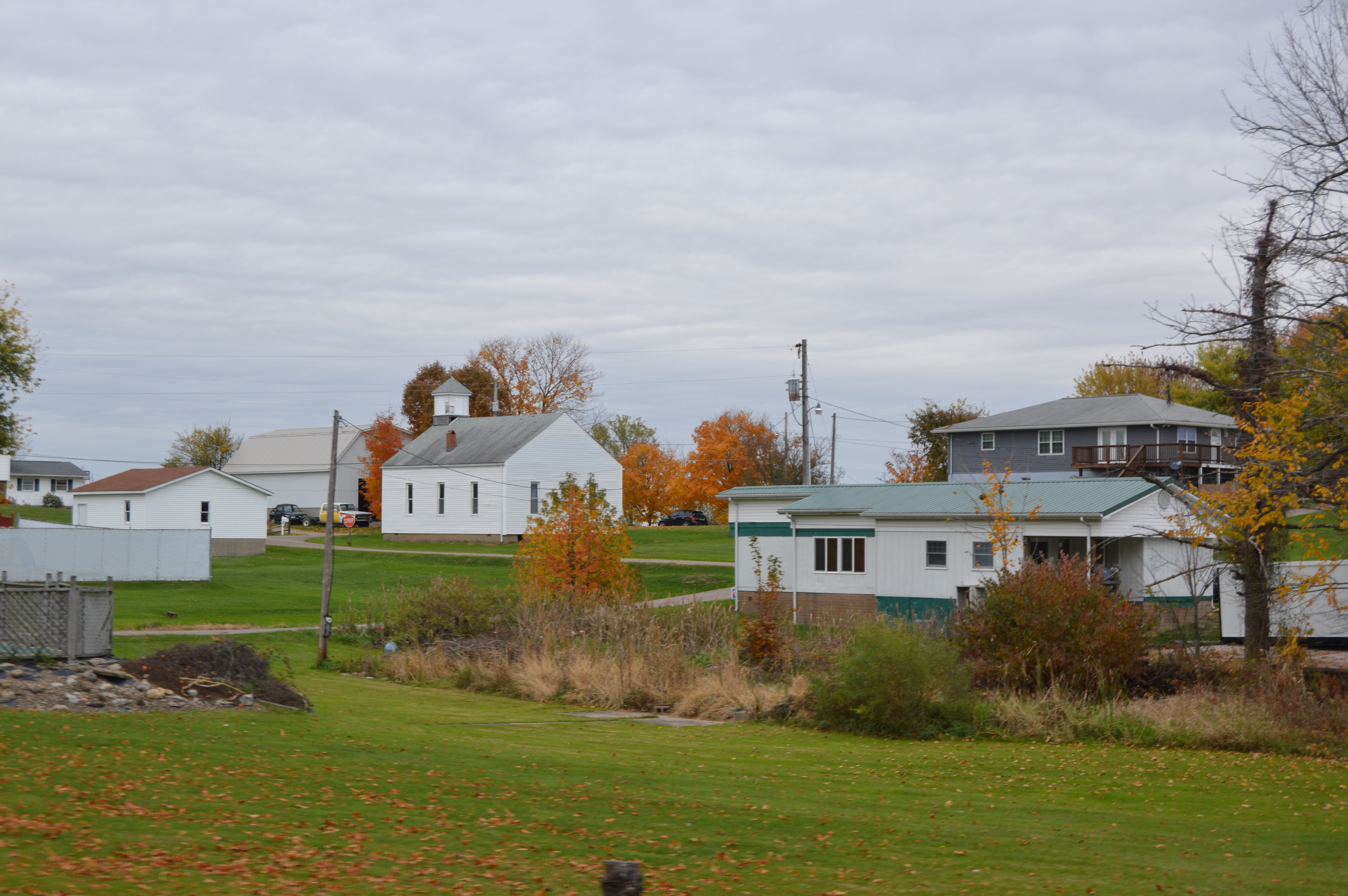
- Scene in the community of Malaga

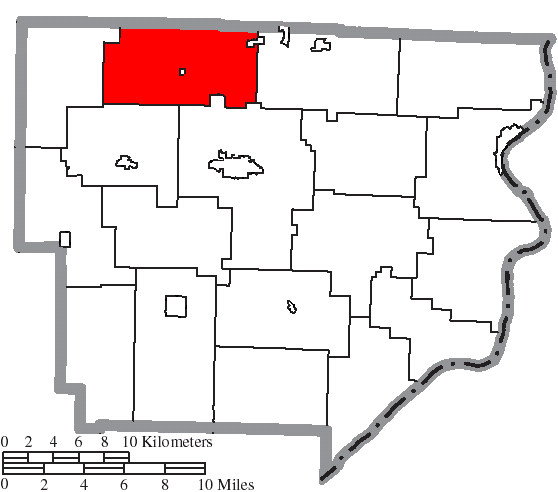
- Location of Malaga Township in Monroe County
- Coordinates: 39°49′41″N 81°8′54″W
- Country: United States
- State: Ohio
- County: Monroe

Area
  - Total: 29.4 sq mi (76.1 km^{2})
  - Land: 29.3 sq mi (75.8 km^{2})
  - Water: 0.12 sq mi (0.3 km^{2})
- Elevation: 1,240 ft (378 m)

Population (2020)
  - Total: 1,038
  - Density: 35.5/sq mi (13.7/km^{2})
- Time zone: UTC-5 (Eastern (EST))
  - Summer (DST): UTC-4 (EDT)
- ZIP code: 43757
- Area code: 740
- FIPS code: 39-46928
- GNIS feature ID: 1086654

Malaga Township (/məˈlɑːɡə/ mə-LAH-gə) is one of the eighteen townships of Monroe County, Ohio, United States. As of the 2020 census, the population was 1,038.

== Geography ==
Located in the northern part of the county, it borders the following townships:

- Somerset Township, Belmont County - north
- Wayne Township, Belmont County - northeast
- Sunsbury Township - east
- Center Township - southeast
- Summit Township - southwest
- Seneca Township - west

Two villages are located in Malaga Township: Miltonsburg in the center, and part of Jerusalem in the northeast. As well, the unincorporated community of Malaga lies in the northern part of the township.

== Name and history ==
It is the only Malaga Township statewide.

A key founder of Malaga Township was John Hendershot, who was born in 1764 in Sussex County, New Jersey. He had three sons between 1788 and 1797. John enlisted in the Pennsylvania Militia, Bedford County Rangers of Frontiers, under Captain William McCall. In 1782, after the Revolutionary War, he first moved to Washington County, Pennsylvania (now Greene County) and then to Monroe County, Ohio. He built a cabin in Malaga Township before 1815, as well as mapped the town out. The first settlers of Malaga Township were the families of John, Stillwell Truax, Mathew Rogers, Martin Fogle, Frederick Hayes, Peter Mann, David Mann, William Kennard, James Graham and David Lupton. This was before 1815. The first election in Malaga Township was held at the home of Peter Mann in 1820.

== Government ==
The township is governed by a three-member board of trustees, who are elected in November of odd-numbered years to a four-year term beginning on the following January 1. Two are elected in the year after the presidential election and one is elected in the year before it. There is also an elected township fiscal officer, who serves a four-year term beginning on April 1 of the year after the election, which is held in November of the year before the presidential election. Vacancies in the fiscal officership or on the board of trustees are filled by the remaining trustees.
