= Marion Township, Ohio =

Marion Township, Ohio may refer to:

- Marion Township, Allen County, Ohio
- Marion Township, Clinton County, Ohio
- Marion Township, Fayette County, Ohio
- Marion Township, Franklin County, Ohio (defunct, now part of Columbus)
- Marion Township, Hancock County, Ohio
- Marion Township, Hardin County, Ohio
- Marion Township, Henry County, Ohio
- Marion Township, Hocking County, Ohio
- Marion Township, Marion County, Ohio
- Marion Township, Mercer County, Ohio
- Marion Township, Morgan County, Ohio
- Marion Township, Noble County, Ohio
- Marion Township, Pike County, Ohio
