= Samuel Danford Farm =

Historic house in Noble County, Ohio, US

- Samuel Danford Farm, Church and Cemetery
- U.S. National Register of Historic Places
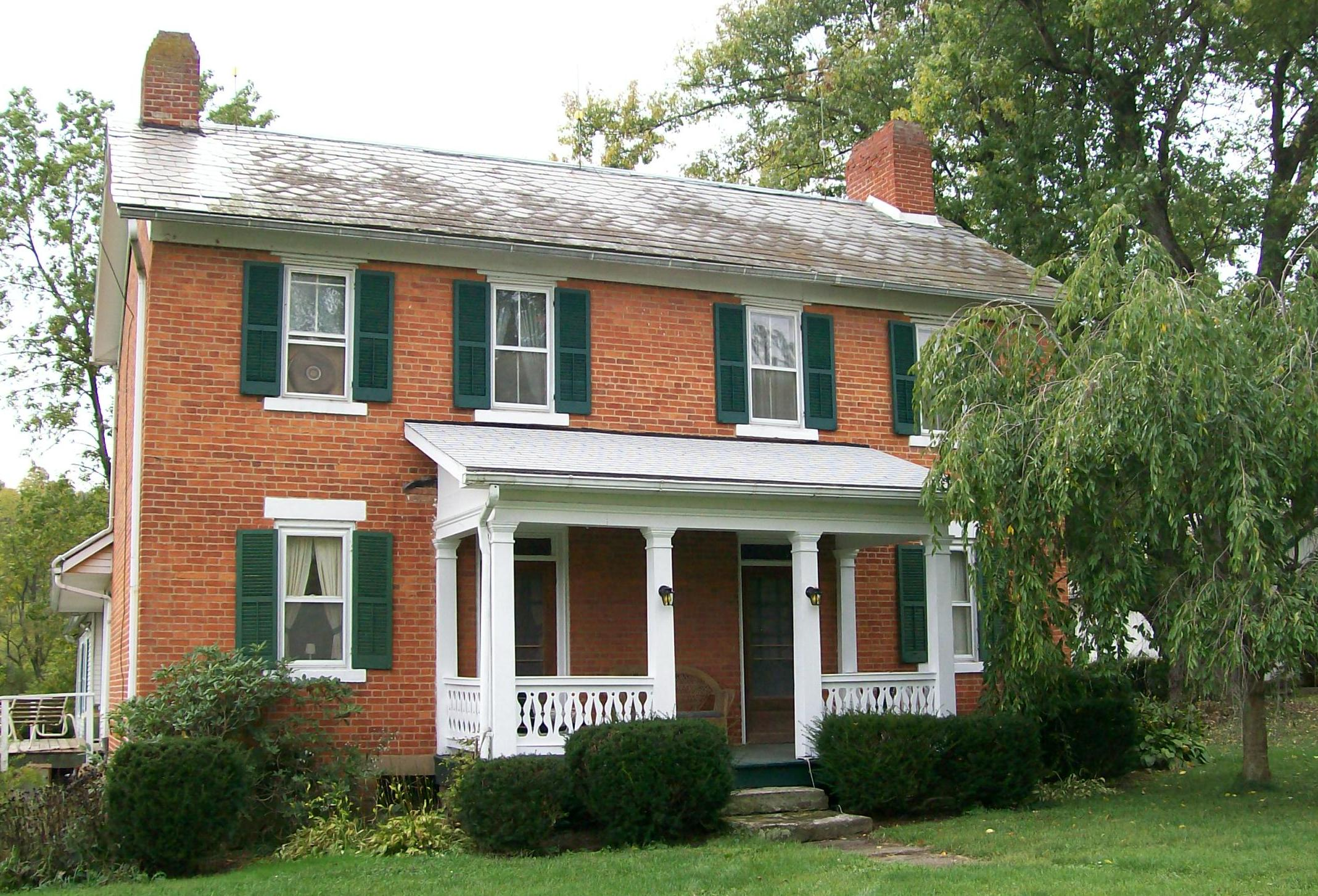
- Front of the Danford House

- Location within Ohio Location within the United States
- Nearest city: Summerfield, Ohio
- Coordinates: 39°51′31″N 81°20′56″W
- Area: 7.5 acres (3.0 ha)
- Built: 1833
- Architectural style: Greek Revival
- NRHP reference No.: 80003204
- Added to NRHP: March 27, 1980

The Samuel Danford Farm is a historic complex of buildings in northeastern Noble County, Ohio, United States. Located near the village of Summerfield, the complex comprises six buildings and one other site in an area of approximately 7.5 acres (3.0 ha).

Samuel Danford first settled at the present farm site in 1817 and quickly built a log cabin. Here he lived for sixteen years before building the present house; constructed of brick on a stone foundation and topped with a slate roof, it features a simple exterior and a simple interior. The floor plan has been modified by the construction of a frame addition to the rear, but no obvious changes have been made to the facade.

Mrs. Danford was an active member of the Methodist Episcopal Church, and local Methodists began to meet for worship at the Danford farm as early as 1818. Known as the Glady Methodist Church, the members decided to construct a church building in 1869 on the Danford property. By this time, Samuel had been dead for more than twenty-five years, but his widow lived to see the completion of the church building; it was occupied until the church dissolved in 1905. Located near the church, and also on the original Danford farm, is the church's cemetery: known as the "Glady Cemetery," it is the burial place of Samuel Danford, of his family, and of many other early Noble County pioneers.

In early 1980, the Danford farm property, including the former church and cemetery, was listed on the National Register of Historic Places. The farm qualified for inclusion on the Register in two separate ways: its architecture was deemed to be historically significant, and it played an important place in the exploration, settlement, and later history of its locality. Such a designation is unusual: the National Park Service requires that both cemeteries and religious properties pass stricter criteria for inclusion on the Register than other types of historic properties.
