= Beaver Township, Noble County, Ohio =

Township in Ohio, US

- Township
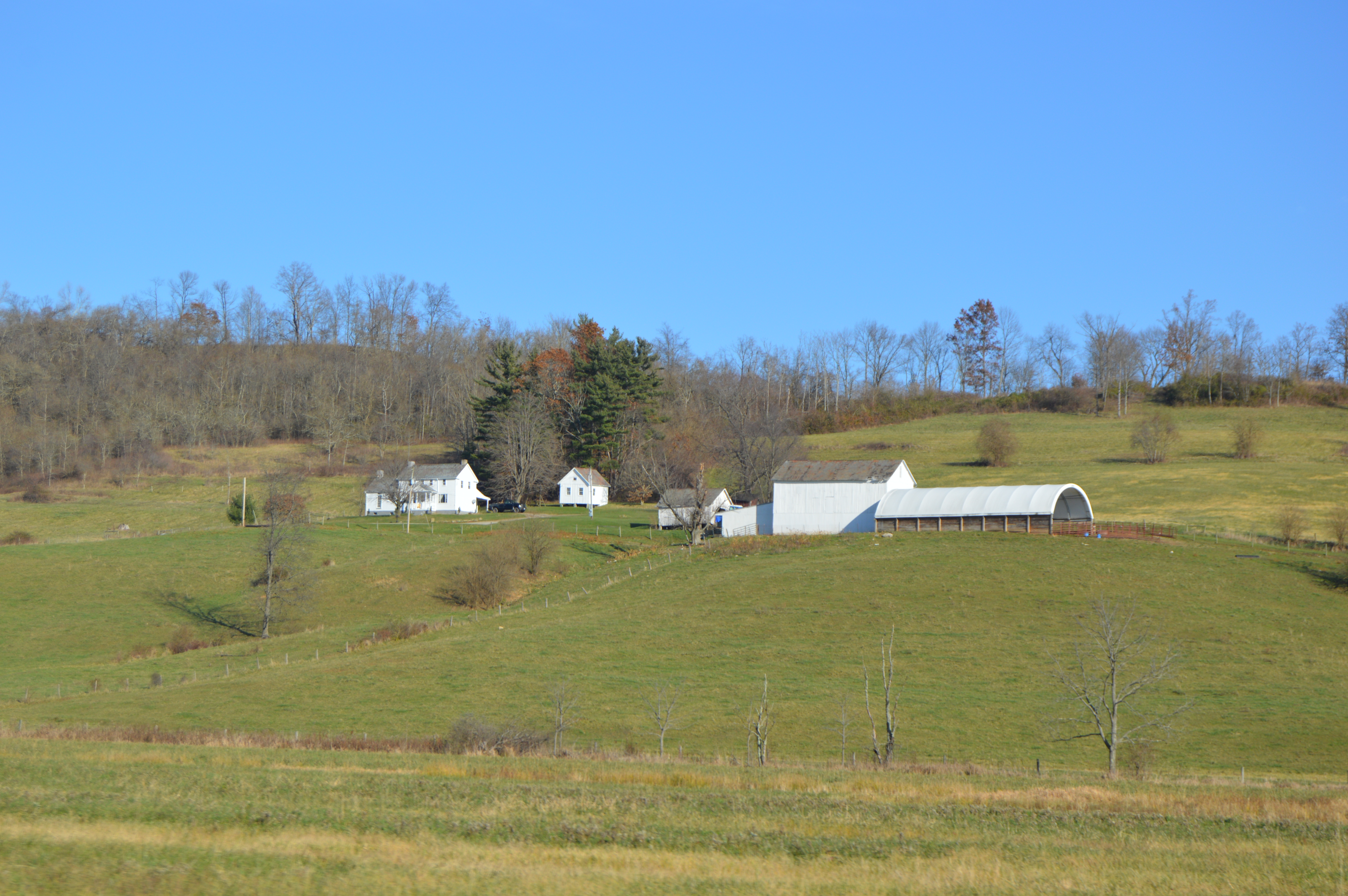
- Farmstead on State Route 147 west of Batesville

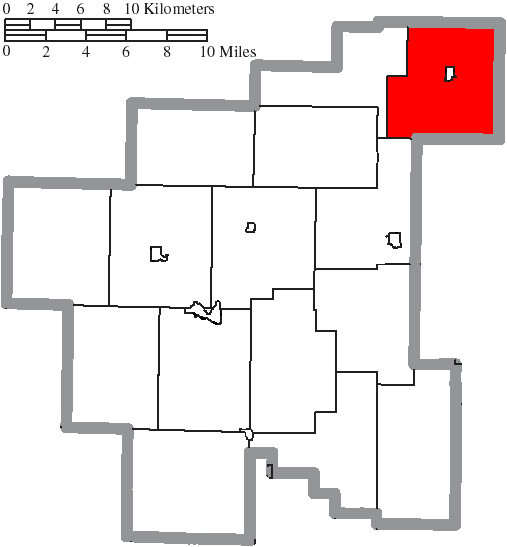
- Location of Beaver Township in Noble County
- Coordinates: 39°55′6″N 81°16′51″W
- Country: United States
- State: Ohio
- County: Noble

Area
  - Total: 29.3 sq mi (76.0 km^{2})
  - Land: 29.3 sq mi (75.8 km^{2})
  - Water: 0.077 sq mi (0.2 km^{2})
- Elevation: 1,040 ft (317 m)

Population (2020)
  - Total: 755
  - Density: 25.8/sq mi (9.96/km^{2})
- Time zone: UTC-5 (Eastern (EST))
  - Summer (DST): UTC-4 (EDT)
- FIPS code: 39-04682
- GNIS feature ID: 1086739

Beaver Township is one of the fifteen townships of Noble County, Ohio, United States. The 2020 census found 755 people in the township.

== Geography ==
Located in the northeastern corner of the county, it borders the following townships:

- Millwood Township, Guernsey County - north
- Somerset Township, Belmont County - east
- Seneca Township, Monroe County - south
- Marion Township - southwest
- Wayne Township - west

The most easterly township in Noble County, it is the only county township to border Belmont County.

Batesville, the smallest village in Noble County, is located in central Beaver Township.

== Name and history ==
Statewide, other Beaver Townships are located in Mahoning and Pike Counties, plus a Beavercreek Township in Greene County.

== Government ==
The township is governed by a three-member board of trustees, who are elected in November of odd-numbered years to a four-year term beginning on the following January 1. Two are elected in the year after the presidential election and one is elected in the year before it. There is also an elected township fiscal officer, who serves a four-year term beginning on April 1 of the year after the election, which is held in November of the year before the presidential election. Vacancies in the fiscal officership or on the board of trustees are filled by the remaining trustees.
