= Wilson, Ohio =

- Village
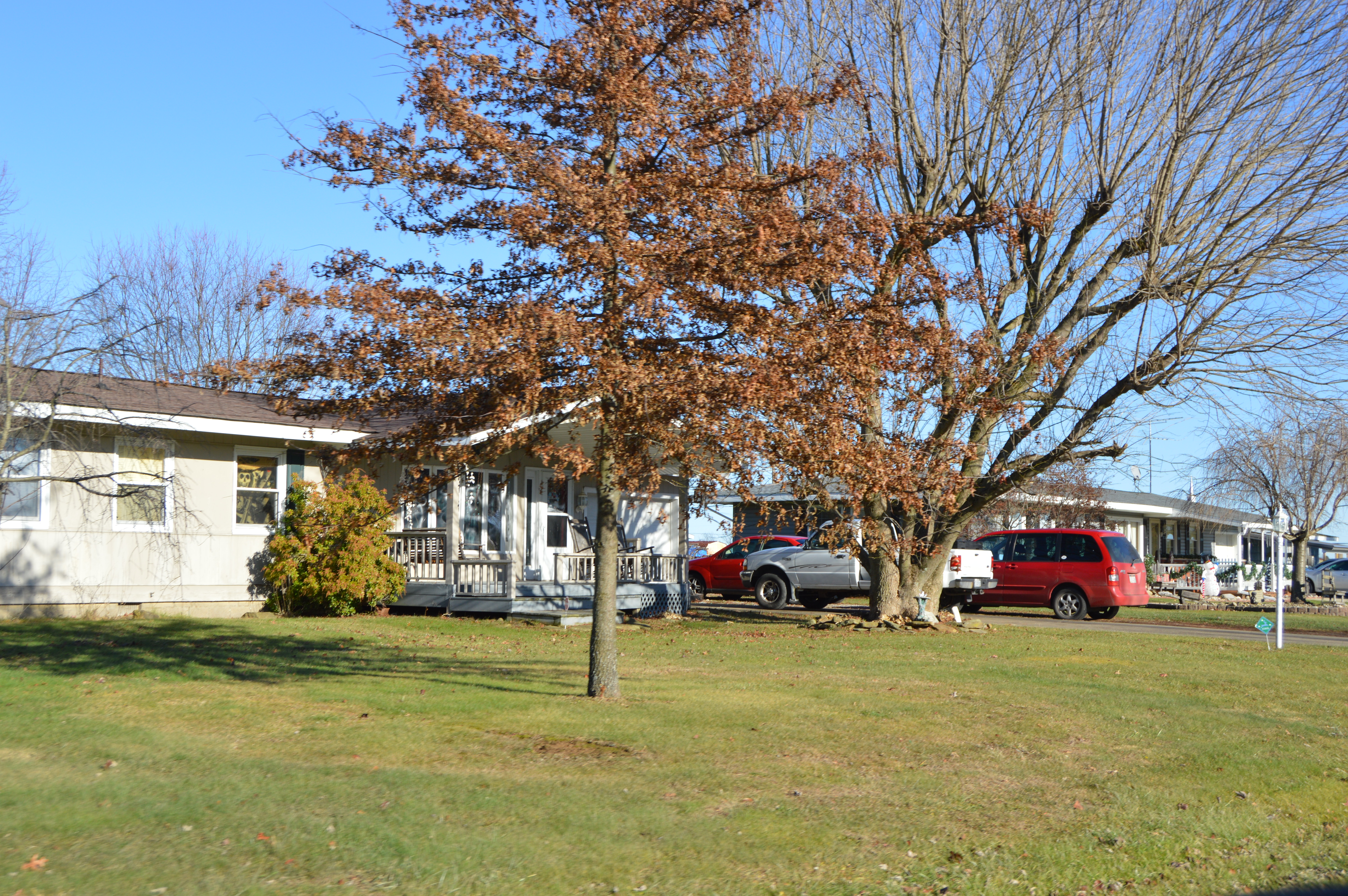
- Houses on East Drive

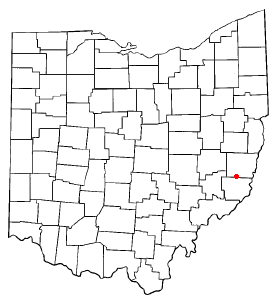
- Location of Wilson, Ohio

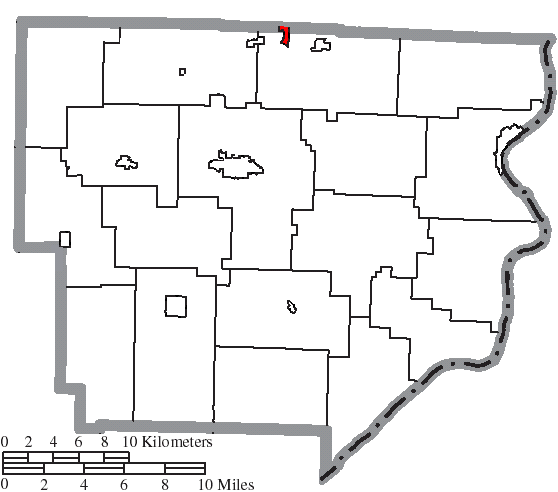
- Location of Wilson in Monroe County
- Coordinates: 39°51′35″N 81°04′08″W
- Country: United States
- State: Ohio
- Counties: Monroe, Belmont
- Townships: Sunsbury, Wayne

Area
  - Total: 0.47 sq mi (1.21 km^{2})
  - Land: 0.41 sq mi (1.06 km^{2})
  - Water: 0.058 sq mi (0.15 km^{2})
- Elevation: 1,253 ft (382 m)

Population (2020)
  - Total: 129
  - Density: 316/sq mi (122.1/km^{2})
- Time zone: UTC-5 (Eastern (EST))
  - Summer (DST): UTC-4 (EDT)
- ZIP code: 43716 (Beallsville)
- Area code(s): 740 & 220
- FIPS code: 39-85834
- GNIS feature ID: 2399707

Wilson is a village in Belmont and Monroe counties in the U.S. state of Ohio. The population was 129 at the 2020 census. It is part of the Wheeling metropolitan area.

== Geography ==
According to the United States Census Bureau, the village has a total area of 0.47 square miles (1.22 km^{2}), of which 0.41 square miles (1.06 km^{2}) is land and 0.06 square miles (0.16 km^{2}) is water.

== Demographics ==
Historical population
Census	Pop.	Note	%±
1960	90		—
1970	133		47.8%
1980	136		2.3%
1990	136		0.0%
2000	118		−13.2%
2010	125		5.9%
2020	129		3.2%
U.S. Decennial Census

=== 2010 census ===
At the 2010 census there were 125 people, 56 households, and 37 families living in the village. The population density was 304.9 inhabitants per square mile (117.7/km^{2}). There were 68 housing units at an average density of 165.9 per square mile (64.1/km^{2}). The racial makeup of the village was 96.0% White and 4.0% from two or more races. Hispanic or Latino of any race were 2.4%.

Of the 56 households 21.4% had children under the age of 18 living with them, 57.1% were married couples living together, 3.6% had a female householder with no husband present, 5.4% had a male householder with no wife present, and 33.9% were non-families. 32.1% of households were one person and 19.6% were one person aged 65 or older. The average household size was 2.23 and the average family size was 2.84.

The median age in the village was 49.8 years. 20% of residents were under the age of 18; 7.2% were between the ages of 18 and 24; 15.2% were from 25 to 44; 32% were from 45 to 64; and 25.6% were 65 or older. The gender makeup of the village was 52.8% male and 47.2% female.

=== 2000 census ===
At the 2000 census there were 118 people, 52 households and 39 families living in the village. The population density was 282.6 inhabitants per square mile (109.1/km^{2}). There were 59 housing units at an average density of 141.3 per square mile (54.6/km^{2}). The racial makeup of the village was 99.15% White, and 0.85% from two or more races. Of the 52 households 23.1% had children under the age of 18 living with them, 67.3% were married couples living together, 5.8% had a female householder with no husband present, and 23.1% were non-families. 21.2% of households were one person and 7.7% were one person aged 65 or older. The average household size was 2.27 and the average family size was 2.63.

The age distribution was 18.6% under the age of 18, 5.1% from 18 to 24, 22.0% from 25 to 44, 31.4% from 45 to 64, and 22.9% 65 or older. The median age was 47 years. For every 100 females there were 118.5 males. For every 100 females age 18 and over, there were 118.2 males.

The median household income was $32,188 and the median family income was $43,125. Males had a median income of $36,875 versus $20,833 for females. The per capita income for the village was $18,552. About 2.6% of families and 4.3% of the population were living below the poverty line, including no under eighteens and 12.5% of those over 64.
