= Seneca Township, Monroe County, Ohio =

Township in Ohio, US

- Township
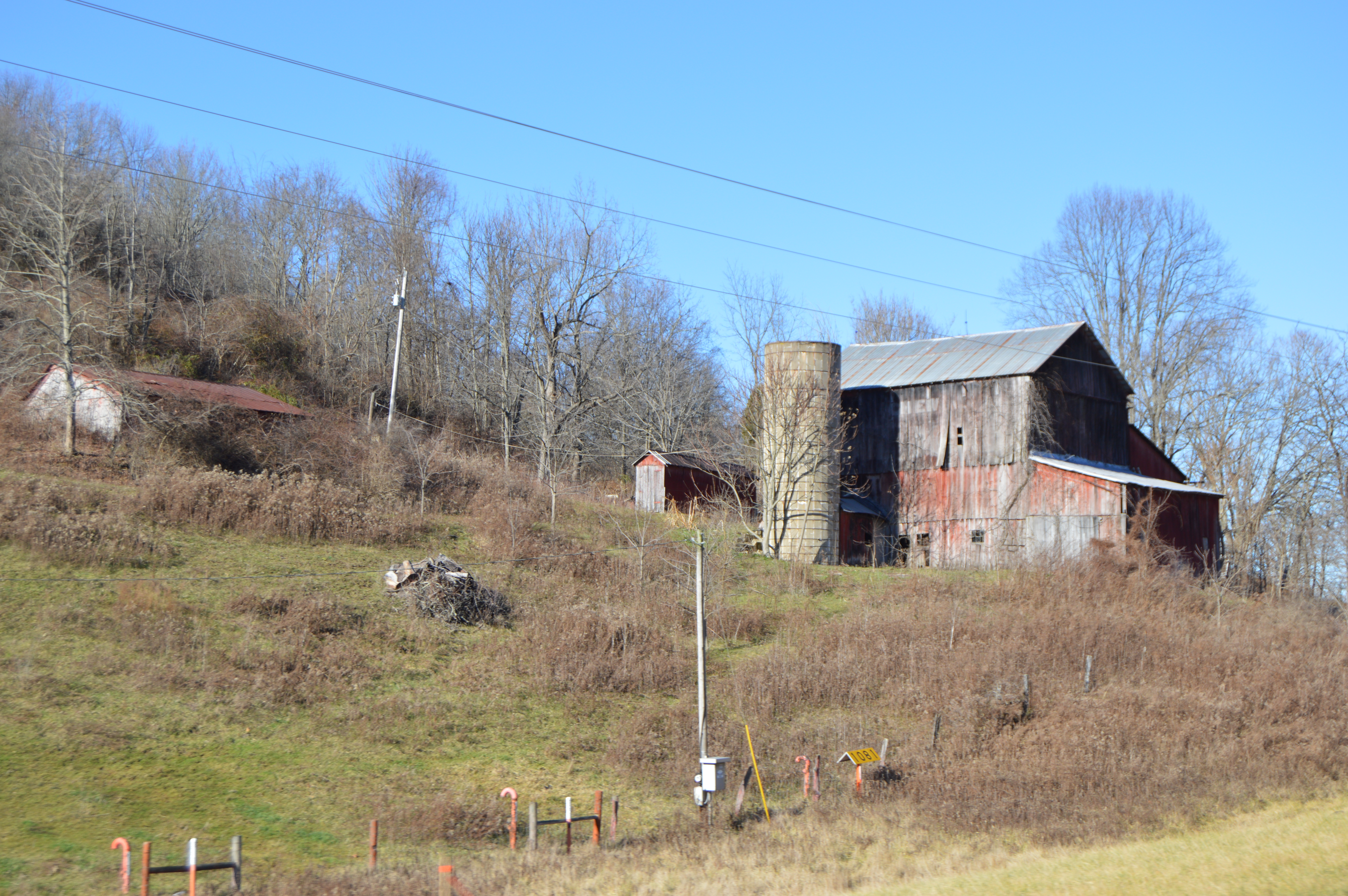
- Farmstead on State Route 78

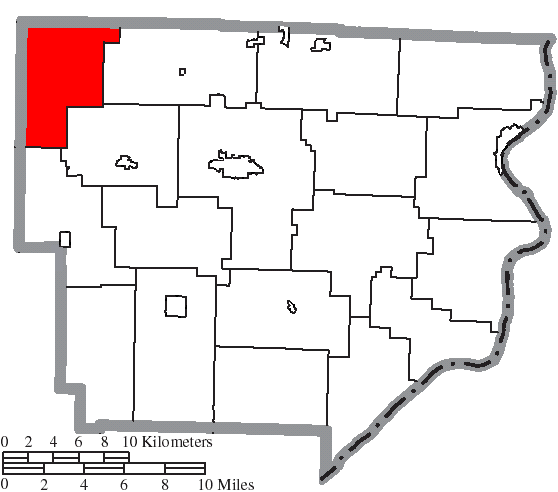
- Location of Seneca Township in Monroe County
- Coordinates: 39°49′17″N 81°16′33″W
- Country: United States
- State: Ohio
- County: Monroe

Area
  - Total: 22.5 sq mi (58.2 km^{2})
  - Land: 22.5 sq mi (58.2 km^{2})
  - Water: 0 sq mi (0.0 km^{2})
- Elevation: 1,135 ft (346 m)

Population (2020)
  - Total: 444
  - Density: 19.8/sq mi (7.63/km^{2})
- Time zone: UTC-5 (Eastern (EST))
  - Summer (DST): UTC-4 (EDT)
- FIPS code: 39-71349
- GNIS feature ID: 1086658

Seneca Township is one of the eighteen townships of Monroe County, Ohio, United States. As of the 2020 census, the population was 444.

== Geography ==
Located in the northwestern corner of the county, it borders the following townships:

- Beaver Township, Noble County - north
- Somerset Township, Belmont County - northeast
- Malaga Township - east
- Summit Township - southeast
- Franklin Township - south
- Stock Township, Noble County - southwest corner
- Marion Township, Noble County - west

No municipalities are located in Seneca Township.

== Name and history ==
Statewide, other Seneca Townships are located in Noble and Seneca counties.

== Government ==
The township is governed by a three-member board of trustees, who are elected in November of odd-numbered years to a four-year term beginning on the following January 1. Two are elected in the year after the presidential election and one is elected in the year before it. There is also an elected township fiscal officer, who serves a four-year term beginning on April 1 of the year after the election, which is held in November of the year before the presidential election. Vacancies in the fiscal officership or on the board of trustees are filled by the remaining trustees.
