= Ohio State Route 556 =

State highway in Monroe County, Ohio, US

State Route 556

Route information
- Maintained by ODOT
- Length: 13.24 mi (21.31 km)
- Existed: 1937–present

Major junctions
- West end: SR 145 in Newtonsville
- East end: SR 7 in Clarington

Location
- Country: United States
- State: Ohio
- Counties: Monroe

Highway system
- Ohio State Highway System; Interstate; US; State; Scenic
| ← SR 555 | → SR 557 |

State Route 556 (SR 556) is an east–west state highway located in the southeastern portion of the U.S. state of Ohio. State Route 556 runs from its western terminus at State Route 145 in Beallsville to its eastern terminus at a T-intersection with State Route 7 in Clarington, just a short distance from the western banks of the Ohio River.

== Route description ==
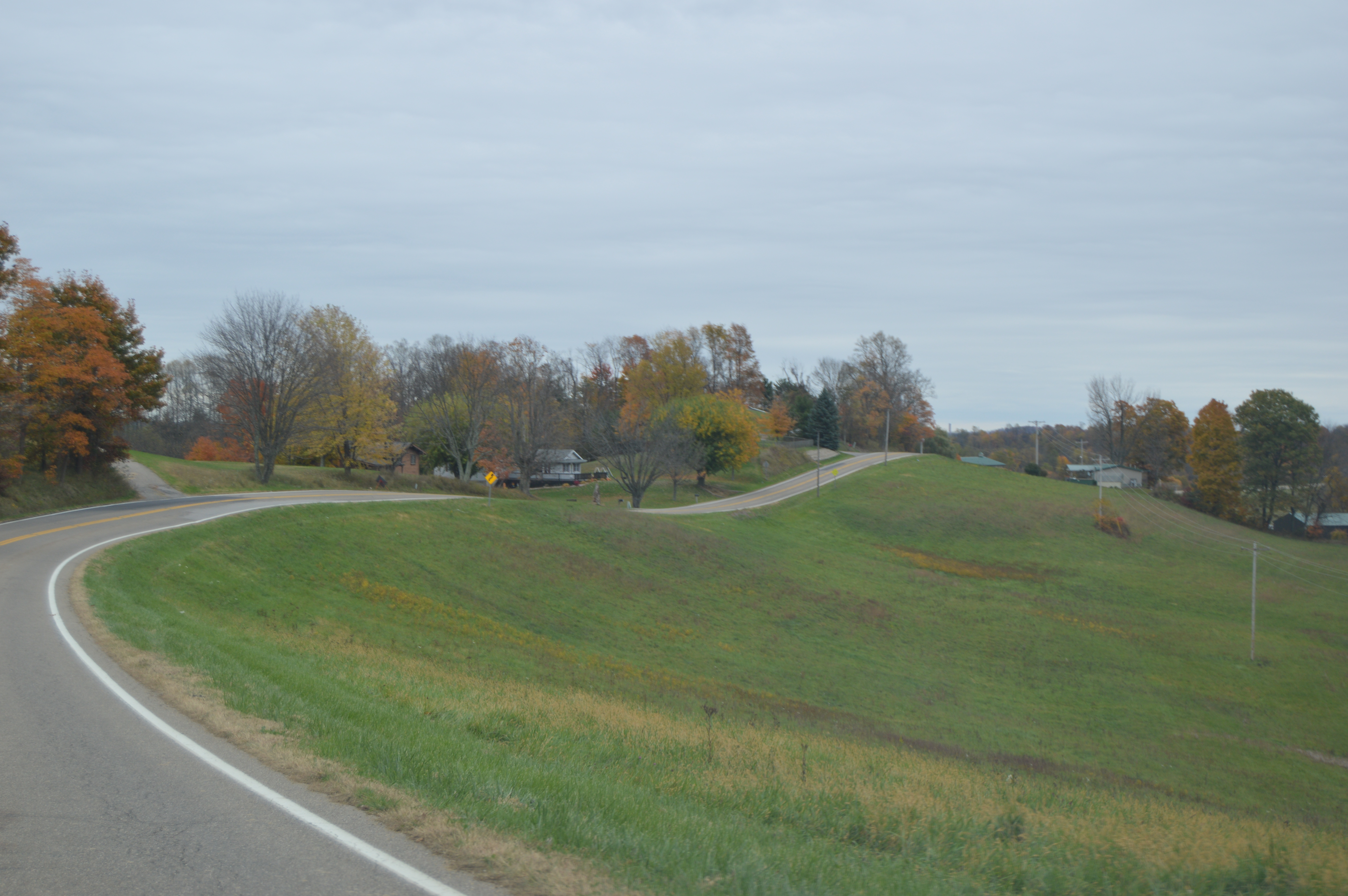
East of Beallsville in Sunsbury Township

State Route 556 runs entirely within the northern part of Monroe County. This highway is not incorporated as a part of the National Highway System, a system of routes identified as being most important for the economy, mobility and defense of the country.

== History ==
The State Route 556 designation was assigned in 1937. It has utilized the same alignment between Beallsville and Clarington through northern Monroe County since its designation. No major changes have taken place to State Route 556's routing since it was created. The only thing that has changed with respect to this route in its history is the route at its western terminus. What is now a part of State Route 145 was designated as State Route 9 when State Route 556 was established.

== Major intersections ==
The entire route is in Monroe County.

| Location | mi | km | Destinations | Notes |
|---|---|---|---|---|
| Beallsville | 0.00 | 0.00 | SR 145 (Main Street / Ohio Avenue) | |
| Clarington | 13.24 | 21.31 | SR 7 – Bellaire, Marietta | |
1.000 mi = 1.609 km; 1.000 km = 0.621 mi
