= Somerset Township, Belmont County, Ohio =

Township in Ohio, US

- Township
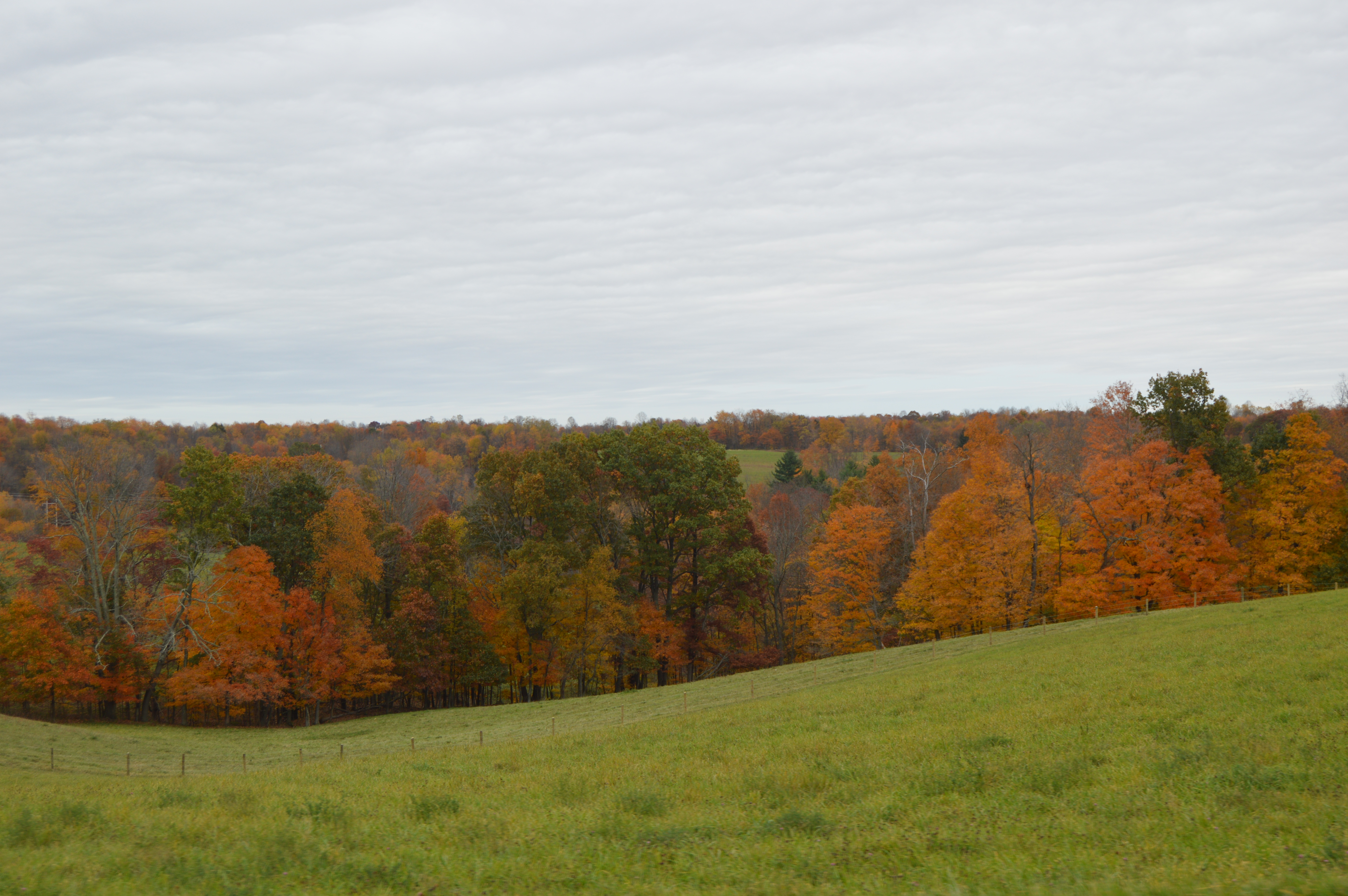
- Hill country in the central part of the township

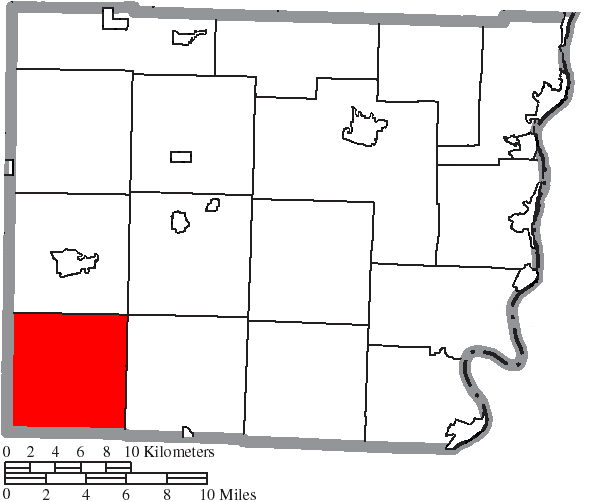
- Location of Somerset Township in Belmont County
- Coordinates: 39°54′21″N 81°11′12″W
- Country: United States
- State: Ohio
- County: Belmont

Area
  - Total: 34.8 sq mi (90.1 km^{2})
  - Land: 34.6 sq mi (89.5 km^{2})
  - Water: 0.23 sq mi (0.6 km^{2})
- Elevation: 1,257 ft (383 m)

Population (2020)
  - Total: 1,242
  - Density: 35.9/sq mi (13.9/km^{2})
- Time zone: UTC-5 (Eastern (EST))
  - Summer (DST): UTC-4 (EDT)
- FIPS code: 39-72970
- GNIS feature ID: 1085785

Somerset Township is one of the sixteen townships of Belmont County, Ohio, United States. The 2020 census found 1,242 people in the township.

== Geography ==
Located in the southwestern corner of the county, it borders the following townships:

- Warren Township - north
- Goshen Township - northeast corner
- Wayne Township - east
- Malaga Township, Monroe County - south
- Seneca Township, Monroe County - southwest
- Beaver Township, Noble County - west
- Millwood Township, Guernsey County - northwest

No municipalities are located in Somerset Township.

== Name and history ==
It is the only Somerset Township statewide.

== Government ==
The township is governed by a three-member board of trustees, who are elected in November of odd-numbered years to a four-year term beginning on the following January 1. Two are elected in the year after the presidential election and one is elected in the year before it. There is also an elected township fiscal officer, who serves a four-year term beginning on April 1 of the year after the election, which is held in November of the year before the presidential election. Vacancies in the fiscal officership or on the board of trustees are filled by the remaining trustees.
