= Batesville, Ohio =

- Village
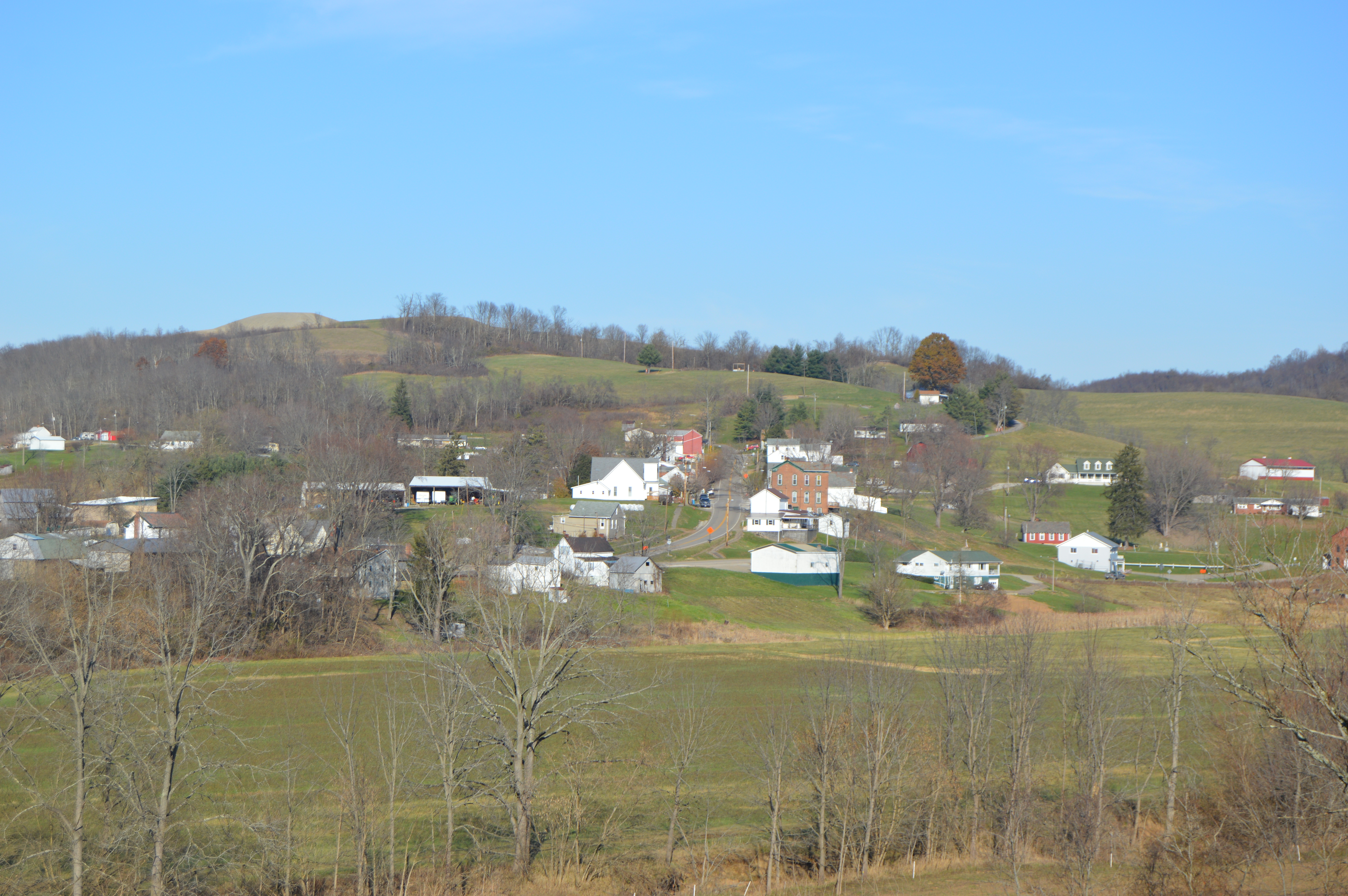
- Overview from State Route 513 to the southwest

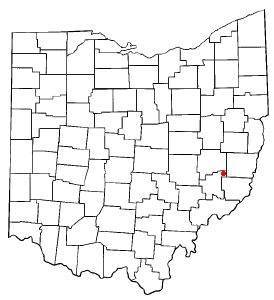
- Location of Batesville, Ohio

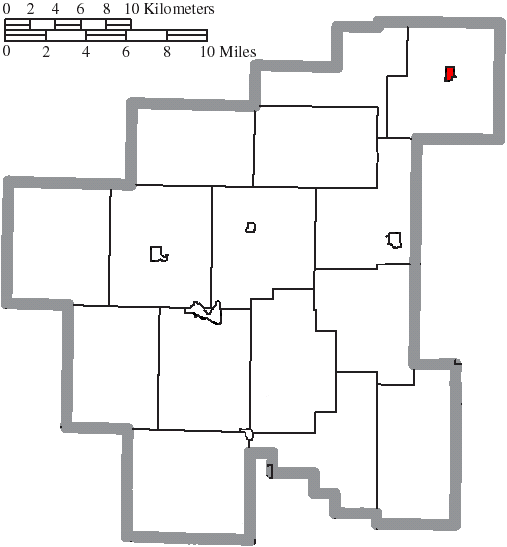
- Location of Batesville in Noble County

- Location in Ohio Batesville (the United States) Batesville (North America)
- Coordinates: 39°54′56″N 81°16′57″W
- Country: United States
- State: Ohio
- County: Noble

Area
  - Total: 0.23 sq mi (0.59 km^{2})
  - Land: 0.23 sq mi (0.59 km^{2})
  - Water: 0 sq mi (0.00 km^{2})
- Elevation: 906 ft (276 m)

Population (2020)
  - Total: 101
  - Estimate (2023): 100
  - Density: 446.2/sq mi (172.28/km^{2})
- Time zone: UTC-5 (Eastern (EST))
  - Summer (DST): UTC-4 (EDT)
- FIPS code: 39-04192
- GNIS feature ID: 2398049

Batesville is a village in Noble County, Ohio, United States. The population was 101 at the 2020 census. Batesville was originally called Williamsburg, and under the latter name was laid out in 1827.

== Geography ==
According to the United States Census Bureau, the village has a total area of 0.14 square miles (0.36 km^{2}), all land.

== Demographics ==
Historical population
Census	Pop.	Note	%±
1880	369		—
1890	327		−11.4%
1900	312		−4.6%
1910	282		−9.6%
1920	220		−22.0%
1930	214		−2.7%
1940	194		−9.3%
1950	149		−23.2%
1960	160		7.4%
1970	148		−7.5%
1980	129		−12.8%
1990	95		−26.4%
2000	100		5.3%
2010	71		−29.0%
2020	101		42.3%
2023 (est.)	100	▼	−1.0%
U.S. Decennial Census

=== 2010 census ===
As of the census of 2010, there were 71 people, 28 households, and 18 families living in the village. The population density was 507.1 inhabitants per square mile (195.8/km^{2}). There were 35 housing units at an average density of 250.0 per square mile (96.5/km^{2}). The racial makeup of the village was 95.8% White, 1.4% African American, and 2.8% from two or more races.

There were 28 households, of which 35.7% had children under the age of 18 living with them, 46.4% were married couples living together, 14.3% had a female householder with no husband present, 3.6% had a male householder with no wife present, and 35.7% were non-families. 35.7% of all households were made up of individuals, and 28.6% had someone living alone who was 65 years of age or older. The average household size was 2.54 and the average family size was 3.11.

The median age in the village was 41.3 years. 23.9% of residents were under the age of 18; 12.7% were between the ages of 18 and 24; 23.9% were from 25 to 44; 22.5% were from 45 to 64; and 16.9% were 65 years of age or older. The gender makeup of the village was 47.9% male and 52.1% female.

=== 2000 census ===
As of the census of 2000, there were 100 people, 40 households, and 28 families living in the village. The population density was 402.7 inhabitants per square mile (155.5/km^{2}). There were 43 housing units at an average density of 173.2 per square mile (66.9/km^{2}). The racial makeup of the village was 100.00% White.

There were 40 households, out of which 40.0% had children under the age of 18 living with them, 55.0% were married couples living together, 7.5% had a female householder with no husband present, and 30.0% were non-families. 27.5% of all households were made up of individuals, and 20.0% had someone living alone who was 65 years of age or older. The average household size was 2.50 and the average family size was 3.11.

In the village, the population was spread out, with 33.0% under the age of 18, 3.0% from 18 to 24, 33.0% from 25 to 44, 16.0% from 45 to 64, and 15.0% who were 65 years of age or older. The median age was 34 years. For every 100 females there were 92.3 males. For every 100 females age 18 and over, there were 97.1 males.

The median income for a household in the village was $26,250, and the median income for a family was $30,625. Males had a median income of $30,625 versus $0 for females. The per capita income for the village was $23,616. There were 12.1% of families and 17.6% of the population living below the poverty line, including 24.4% of under eighteens and 10.5% of those over 64.

== Notable people ==
- Margaret Keenan Harrais (1872–1964), educator, suffragist, temperance reformer, and government official
