= Clarington, Ohio =

- Village
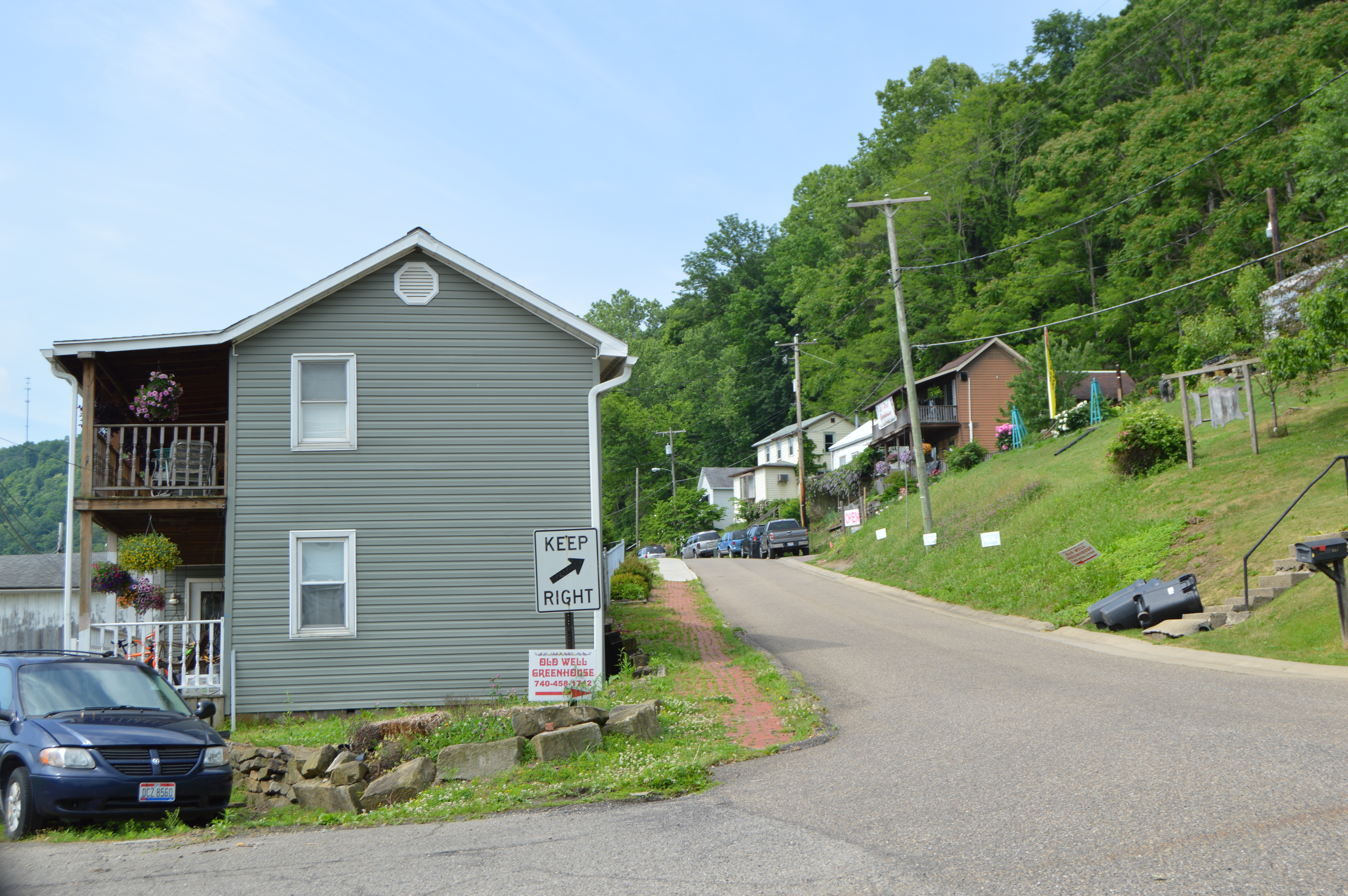
- Houses on Market Street

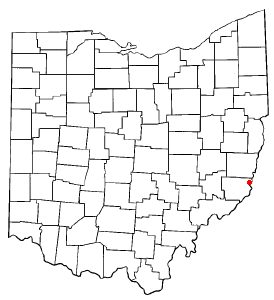
- Location of Clarington, Ohio

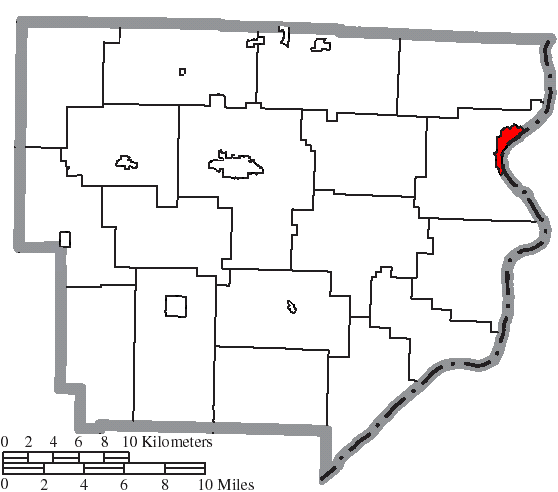
- Location of Clarington in Monroe County
- Coordinates: 39°46′22″N 80°52′15″W
- Country: United States
- State: Ohio
- County: Monroe
- Township: Salem

Area
  - Total: 1.24 sq mi (3.22 km^{2})
  - Land: 1.14 sq mi (2.96 km^{2})
  - Water: 0.10 sq mi (0.26 km^{2})
- Elevation: 640 ft (200 m)

Population (2020)
  - Total: 280
  - Estimate (2023): 272
  - Density: 244.7/sq mi (94.49/km^{2})
- Time zone: UTC-5 (Eastern (EST))
  - Summer (DST): UTC-4 (EDT)
- ZIP code: 43915
- Area code: 740
- FIPS code: 39-15210
- GNIS feature ID: 2397630

Clarington is a village in Monroe County, Ohio, United States, along the Ohio River. The population was 280 at the 2020 census.

== History ==
Clarington was described in 1833 as having two stores, one tavern, one physician and ten residential houses. According to Howe's Historical Collections of Ohio, "It was laid out in 1822 by David Pierson, who named it after his daughter Clarinda."

During the mid-1800s, Clarington grew considerably and soon was a booming river port town with nearly 1,500 residents. The village boasted a cigar factory, blacksmith shop, restaurants, lodgings, and employed many residents at the local boat yard. Mozena Brothers Boat Yard designed and built many western river steam "packet-boats" on site in Clarington near the mouth of Sunfish Creek. Most famous of these boats was the 1912 built Liberty. A mural of the boat by artist Ruston Baker can be seen in town. By the late 1920s, boat building was on the decline and Mozena Brothers sold out to Cook Brothers & Thomas Boat Yard. Barges, small gas powered ferries, and other craft continued to be built in Clarington up to 1941. Geographically, Clarington was the last port on the Ohio River before crossing the Mason–Dixon line just a few miles south of the village. Noted author, river historian, and educator J. Mack Gamble was a lifelong resident of the town.

The non-profit Ohio Valley River Museum in Clarington serves to preserve and promote the history of Clarington's past, western river steamboats, the impact of river industries, and the role it plays in future development. The current museum president is Taylor Abbott. Barbara Rush serves as director. The museum is operated by a nine-member board of directors.

In recent years, Clarington has become an epicenter of oil and gas activity after drilling discoveries of Utica and Marcellus gas formations. As of late 2014, Appalachian Resins had signed a letter of intent to lease 50 acres in Clarington. The Houston-based company plans to construct a $1 billion plant on the site that will use ethane, a component of natural gas, from the nearby Utica and Marcellus formations and break it down into ethylene. The project is considered a major development and boost to the economy of Monroe County following the closure of the Ormet aluminum plant.

== Geography ==
According to the United States Census Bureau, the village has a total area of 1.24 square miles (3.21 km^{2}), of which, 1.14 square miles (2.95 km^{2}) is land and 0.10 square miles (0.26 km^{2}) is water.

=== Climate ===
The climate in this area is characterized by relatively high temperatures and evenly distributed precipitation throughout the year. According to the Köppen Climate Classification system, Clarington has a Humid subtropical climate, abbreviated "Cfa" on climate maps.

Climate data for Clarington, Ohio
Month	Jan	Feb	Mar	Apr	May	Jun	Jul	Aug	Sep	Oct	Nov	Dec	Year
Mean daily maximum °C (°F)	6 (42)	7 (44)	13 (56)	19 (66)	24 (76)	28 (82)	30 (86)	29 (85)	27 (81)	21 (69)	12 (54)	6 (43)	18 (65)
Mean daily minimum °C (°F)	−6 (22)	−6 (22)	−1 (31)	4 (39)	9 (49)	14 (57)	16 (61)	16 (61)	12 (54)	6 (42)	0 (32)	−4 (25)	5 (41)
Average precipitation mm (inches)	94 (3.7)	79 (3.1)	99 (3.9)	97 (3.8)	110 (4.2)	110 (4.3)	110 (4.5)	100 (4)	76 (3)	74 (2.9)	76 (3)	84 (3.3)	1,110 (43.7)
Source: Weatherbase

== Demographics ==
Historical population
Census	Pop.	Note	%±
1850	341		—
1870	728		—
1880	915		25.7%
1890	762		−16.7%
1900	905		18.8%
1910	784		−13.4%
1920	607		−22.6%
1930	506		−16.6%
1940	490		−3.2%
1950	478		−2.4%
1960	394		−17.6%
1970	338		−14.2%
1980	558		65.1%
1990	406		−27.2%
2000	444		9.4%
2010	384		−13.5%
2020	280		−27.1%
2023 (est.)	272	▼	−2.9%
U.S. Decennial Census

=== 2010 census ===
As of the census of 2010, there were 384 people, 165 households, and 107 families residing in the village. The population density was 336.8 inhabitants per square mile (130.0/km^{2}). There were 186 housing units at an average density of 163.2 per square mile (63.0/km^{2}). The racial makeup of the village was 96.9% White, 1.0% African American, and 2.1% from two or more races. Hispanic or Latino people of any race were 0.3% of the population.

There were 165 households, of which 29.1% had children under the age of 18 living with them, 42.4% were married couples living together, 16.4% had a female householder with no husband present, 6.1% had a male householder with no wife present, and 35.2% were non-families. 32.1% of all households were made up of individuals, and 13.9% had someone living alone who was 65 years of age or older. The average household size was 2.33 and the average family size was 2.88.

The median age in the village was 40.3 years. 23.4% of residents were under the age of 18; 8.9% were between the ages of 18 and 24; 24.2% were from 25 to 44; 28.1% were from 45 to 64; and 15.4% were 65 years of age or older. The gender makeup of the village was 44.5% male and 55.5% female.

=== 2000 census ===
As of the census of 2000, there were 444 people, 182 households, and 125 families residing in the village. The population density was 397.3 inhabitants per square mile (153.4/km^{2}). There were 209 housing units at an average density of 187.0 per square mile (72.2/km^{2}). The racial makeup of the village was 99.10% White, 0.68% African American, and 0.23% from two or more races. Hispanic or Latino people of any race were 0.68% of the population.

There were 182 households, out of which 28.6% had children under the age of 18 living with them, 51.6% were married couples living together, 12.1% had a female householder with no husband present, and 30.8% were non-families. 23.6% of all households were made up of individuals, and 15.4% had someone living alone who was 65 years of age or older. The average household size was 2.44 and the average family size was 2.89.

In the village, the population was spread out, with 23.0% under the age of 18, 6.8% from 18 to 24, 28.2% from 25 to 44, 23.9% from 45 to 64, and 18.2% who were 65 years of age or older. The median age was 40 years. For every 100 females, there were 89.7 males. For every 100 females age 18 and over, there were 86.9 males.

The median income for a household in the village was $28,281, and the median income for a family was $31,875. Males had a median income of $30,750 versus $20,938 for females. The per capita income for the village was $13,730. About 21.4% of families and 25.2% of the population were below the poverty line, including 31.1% of those under age 18 and 15.0% of those age 65 or over.

== See also ==
- List of cities and towns along the Ohio River
