= Summerfield, Ohio =

- Village
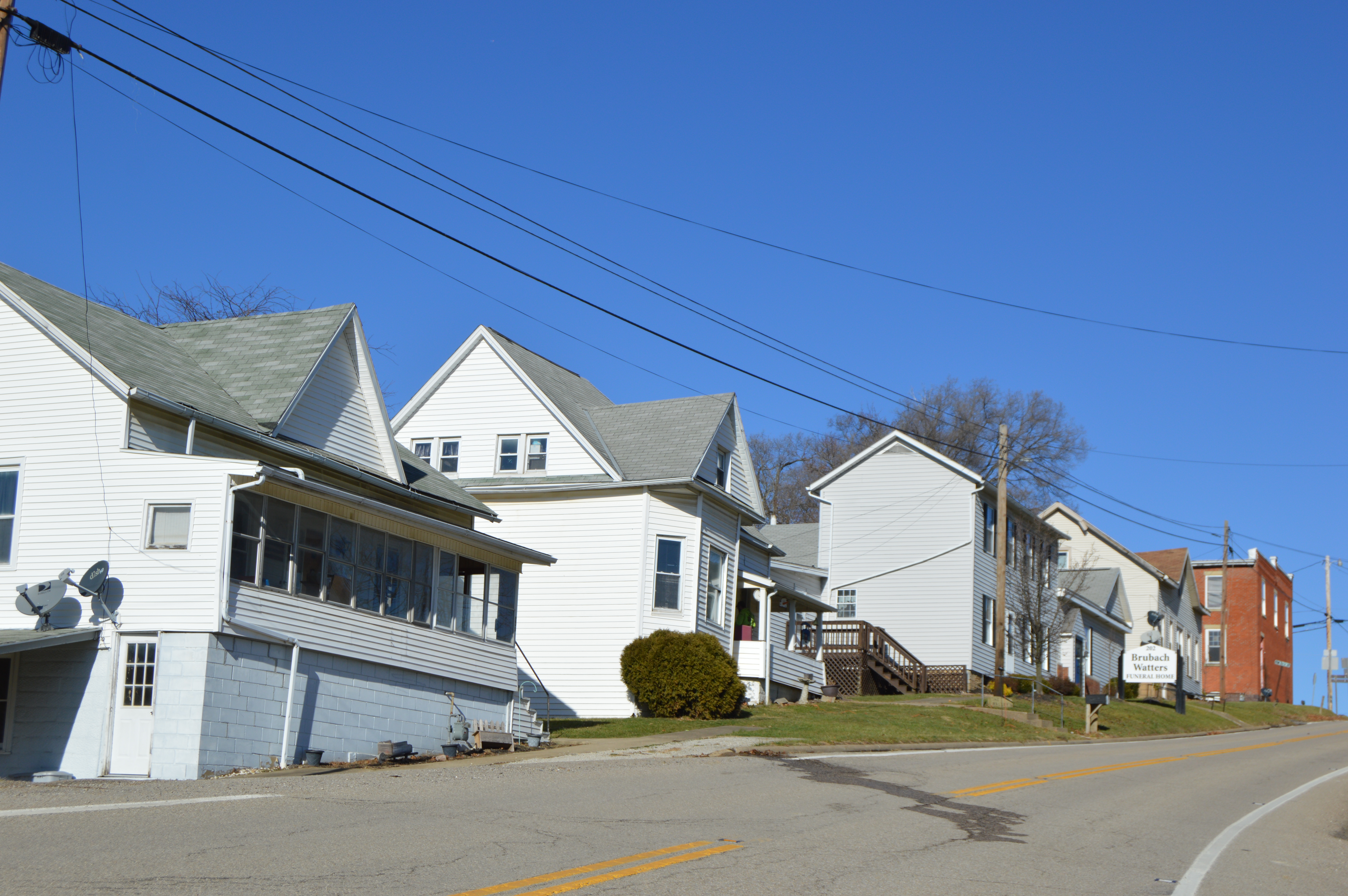
- South Main Street

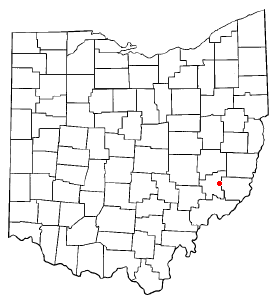
- Location of Summerfield, Ohio

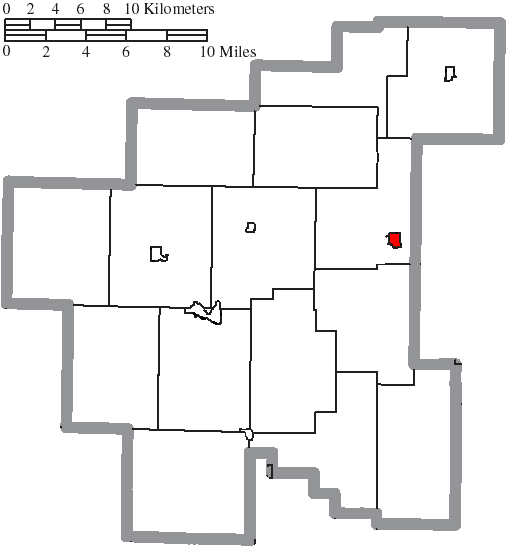
- Location of Summerfield in Noble County
- Coordinates: 39°47′49″N 81°20′08″W
- Country: United States
- State: Ohio
- County: Noble

Government
  - Mayor: Joyce Laipply

Area
  - Total: 0.37 sq mi (0.96 km^{2})
  - Land: 0.37 sq mi (0.96 km^{2})
  - Water: 0 sq mi (0.00 km^{2})
- Elevation: 1,207 ft (368 m)

Population (2020)
  - Total: 237
  - Density: 667.6/sq mi (257.77/km^{2})
- Time zone: UTC-5 (Eastern (EST))
  - Summer (DST): UTC-4 (EDT)
- ZIP code: 43788
- Area code: 740
- FIPS code: 39-75406
- GNIS feature ID: 2399928

Summerfield is a village in Noble County, Ohio, United States. The population was 237 at the 2020 census, down from 254 at the 2010 census.

== History ==
Summerfield was platted in 1827, and named after John Summerfield, a local minister.

Pioneer Samuel Danford settled in the Summerfield vicinity in 1817; his farm is listed on the National Register of Historic Places.

== Geography ==
According to the United States Census Bureau, the village has a total area of 0.37 square miles (0.96 km^{2}), all land.

== Demographics ==
Historical population
Census	Pop.	Note	%±
1870	470		—
1880	435		−7.4%
1890	582		33.8%
1900	511		−12.2%
1910	489		−4.3%
1920	484		−1.0%
1930	394		−18.6%
1940	372		−5.6%
1950	368		−1.1%
1960	352		−4.3%
1970	306		−13.1%
1980	299		−2.3%
1990	295		−1.3%
2000	296		0.3%
2010	254		−14.2%
2020	237		−6.7%
U.S. Decennial Census

=== 2010 census ===
As of the census of 2010, there were 254 people, 107 households, and 71 families living in the village. The population density was 686.5 inhabitants per square mile (265.1/km^{2}). There were 126 housing units at an average density of 340.5 per square mile (131.5/km^{2}). The racial makeup of the village was 98.4% White, 0.4% Asian, and 1.2% from other races. Hispanic or Latino of any race were 1.2% of the population.

There were 107 households, of which 36.4% had children under the age of 18 living with them, 43.0% were married couples living together, 13.1% had a female householder with no husband present, 10.3% had a male householder with no wife present, and 33.6% were non-families. 29.9% of all households were made up of individuals, and 8.4% had someone living alone who was 65 years of age or older. The average household size was 2.37 and the average family size was 2.86.

The median age in the village was 39 years. 24% of residents were under the age of 18; 13.8% were between the ages of 18 and 24; 24.7% were from 25 to 44; 24.4% were from 45 to 64; and 13% were 65 years of age or older. The gender makeup of the village was 49.2% male and 50.8% female.

=== 2000 census ===
As of the census of 2000, there were 296 people, 103 households, and 77 families living in the village. The population density was 799.3 people per square mile (308.9/km^{2}). There were 116 housing units at an average density of 313.3 per square mile (121.0/km^{2}). The racial makeup of the village was 100.00% White.

There were 103 households, out of which 45.6% had children under the age of 18 living with them, 60.2% were married couples living together, 9.7% had a female householder with no husband present, and 24.3% were non-families. 20.4% of all households were made up of individuals, and 14.6% had someone living alone who was 65 years of age or older. The average household size was 2.87 and the average family size was 3.38.

In the village, the population was spread out, with 35.8% under the age of 18, 8.1% from 18 to 24, 24.7% from 25 to 44, 19.6% from 45 to 64, and 11.8% who were 65 years of age or older. The median age was 28 years. For every 100 females there were 89.7 males. For every 100 females age 18 and over, there were 81.0 males.

The median income for a household in the village was $28,750, and the median income for a family was $29,844. Males had a median income of $29,375 versus $16,250 for females. The per capita income for the village was $15,132. About 19.8% of families and 16.7% of the population were below the poverty line, including 17.5% of those under the age of eighteen and 24.4% of those 65 or over.

== Notable person ==
- James M. Tuttle - Union Civil War general and Democratic candidate for Governor of Iowa in 1863; born in Summerfield.
