= National Register of Historic Places listings in Monroe County, Ohio =

Location of Monroe County in Ohio

This is a list of the National Register of Historic Places listings in Monroe County, Ohio.

This is intended to be a complete list of the properties on the National Register of Historic Places in Monroe County, Ohio, United States. The locations of National Register properties for which the latitude and longitude coordinates are included below, may be seen in an online map.

There are 11 properties listed on the National Register in the county.

This National Park Service list is complete through NPS recent listings posted March 14, 2025.

== Current listings ==
	Name on the Register	Image	Date listed	Location	City or town	Description
1	First United Methodist Church	First United Methodist Church	August 9, 2006 (#06000694)	136 N. Main St. 39°45′49″N 81°06′54″W	Woodsfield	
2	Foraker Bridge	Foraker Bridge	June 5, 1975 (#75001493)	3 miles east of Graysville on Plainview Rd. 39°39′20″N 81°07′16″W	Perry Township	
3	Hollister-Parry House	Hollister-Parry House	April 16, 1980 (#80003166)	217 Eastern Ave. 39°45′40″N 81°06′44″W	Woodsfield	
4	Frederick Kindleberger Stone House and Barn	Frederick Kindleberger Stone House and Barn	February 8, 1980 (#80003163)	Northwest of Clarington on State Route 25; 39°49′50″N 80°54′21″W	Switzerland Township	
5	Knowlton Covered Bridge	Knowlton Covered Bridge	March 11, 1980 (#80003165)	North of Rinard Mills; 39°36′04″N 81°09′26″W	Washington Township	
6	Monroe Bank	Monroe Bank	March 11, 1980 (#80003167)	117 Main St. 39°45′47″N 81°06′57″W	Woodsfield	
7	Monroe County Courthouse	Monroe County Courthouse	July 21, 1980 (#80003168)	Main St. 39°45′46″N 81°06′59″W	Woodsfield	
8	Monroe Theatre		October 11, 2024 (#100010914)	104 North Main Street; 39°45′46″N 81°06′56″W	Woodsfield	
9	William C. Mooney House	William C. Mooney House	March 15, 1982 (#82003615)	122 N. Paul St. 39°45′50″N 81°06′46″W	Woodsfield	
10	Walter Ring House and Mill Site	Walter Ring House and Mill Site	November 28, 1980 (#80003164)	Northern side of Township Road 575 at its crossing of the Little Muskingum River; 39°36′26″N 81°07′20″W	Benton Township	
11	Salem Church	Salem Church	August 18, 1992 (#92000989)	48452 State Route 255, north of Sardis; 39°39′57″N 80°57′00″W	Ohio Township	

== See also ==
- List of National Historic Landmarks in Ohio
- Listings in neighboring counties: Belmont, Marshall (WV), Noble, Tyler (WV), Washington, Wetzel (WV)
- National Register of Historic Places listings in Ohio
