= Ohio State Route 536 =

State highway in Monroe County, Ohio, US

State Route 536

Route information
- Maintained by ODOT
- Length: 12.58 mi (20.25 km)
- Existed: 1937–present

Major junctions
- South end: WV 7 near Hannibal
- SR 7 in Hannibal
- North end: SR 78 in Adams Township

Location
- Country: United States
- State: Ohio
- Counties: Monroe

Highway system
- Ohio State Highway System; Interstate; US; State; Scenic
| ← SR 535 | → SR 537 |

State Route 536 (SR 536) is a state highway in Monroe County, Ohio. At 12.58 miles (20.25 km) long, the highway runs from the West Virginia state line at the New Martinsville Bridge near Hannibal to SR 78 in Adams Township. The route south of the northernmost intersection with SR 7 in Hannibal is not signed by the Ohio Department of Transportation (ODOT). The route is signed and designated as a north–south route though the route physically runs northwest–southeast.

== Route description ==
SR 536 begins unsigned at the West Virginia state line on the New Martinsville Bridge while crossing over the Ohio River. The bridge carries West Virginia Route 7 east of this point. The route heads due west over the remainder of the bridge until both directions of the two-lane road split apart and immediately intersect SR 7, a divided highway. Officially, the two routes run concurrent north for 0.4 miles (0.64 km) until the intersection with Main Street though according to signage, SR 536 begins at this intersection with Main Street.

Here, the route becomes fully signed and travels west through Hannibal. Near the center of town, the route turns north, passes a school, and begins climbing a hill. After many hairpin turns, the road is out of Hannibal and travels at the top of a ridge through the Monroe County hills. Except when it descends into the Opossum Creek valley, it remains at the top of the hills as it travels northwest through Ohio and Green Townships as well as portions of the Wayne National Forest. The route ends at an unsignalized intersection in Adams Township with SR 78.

== History ==
The highway connecting Hannibal and SR 78 was first designated as SR 536 in 1937. The route remained largely unchanged except in 1961 when the New Martinsville Bridge opened.

== Major intersections ==
The entire route is in Monroe County.

| Location | mi | km | Destinations | Notes |
|---|---|---|---|---|
| Ohio River | | | WV 7 east – New Martinsville | West Virginia state line; southern terminus |
| Ohio River | 0.00 | 0.00 | New Martinsville Bridge | |
| Ohio Township | 0.24 | 0.39 | SR 7 south – Matamoras, Marietta | Southern end of SR 7 concurrency |
| Ohio Township | 0.64 | 1.03 | SR 7 north – Clarington | Northern end of SR 7 concurrency; signed southern terminus of SR 536 |
| Adams Township | 12.58 | 20.25 | SR 78 – Woodsfield, Clarington | Northern terminus |
1.000 mi = 1.609 km; 1.000 km = 0.621 mi: Concurrency terminus
