= Lee Township, Ohio =

Lee Township, Ohio, may refer to:

- Lee Township, Athens County, Ohio
- Lee Township, Carroll County, Ohio
- Lee Township, Monroe County, Ohio
