= West Virginia Route 7 =

State highway in West Virginia, United States

West Virginia Route 7

Route information
- Maintained by WVDOH
- Length: 102.5 mi (165.0 km)

Major junctions
- West end: SR 536 at New Martinsville
- WV 2 in New Martinsville; US 250 near Hundred; US 19 near Morgantown; US 119 in Morgantown; I-68 in Morgantown
- East end: MD 39 near Corinth

Location
- Country: United States
- State: West Virginia
- Counties: Wetzel; Monongalia; Preston

Highway system
- West Virginia State Highway System; Interstate; US; State
← WV 6	→ WV 8

West Virginia Route 7 is an east–west state highway located in the U.S. state of West Virginia. The western terminus of the route is at the Ohio state line in New Martinsville, where WV 7 becomes State Route 536 upon crossing the Ohio River. The eastern terminus is at the Maryland state line east of Corinth, where WV 7 continues as Maryland Route 39.

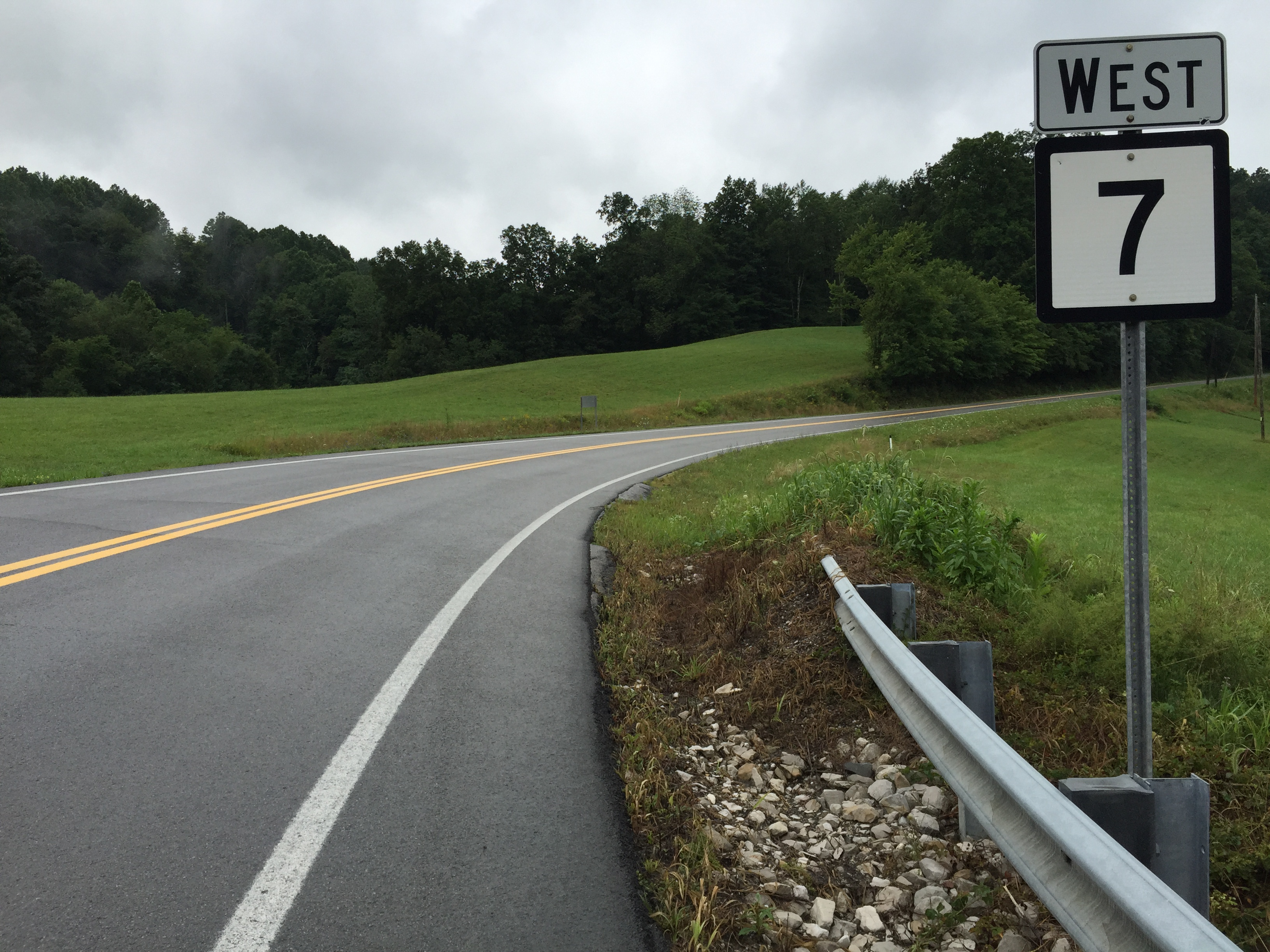
View west along WV 7 at CR 7/16 in Wetzel County, July 2017

== Major intersections ==
County	Location	mi	km	Destinations	Notes
Wetzel	New Martinsville			SR 536 to SR 7 north – Hannibal	Western terminus; Ohio state line (New Martinsville Bridge over Ohio River)
Wetzel	New Martinsville			WV 2 north – Wheeling	interchange; West end of WV 2 concurrecy
Wetzel	New Martinsville			WV 2 south – Parkersburg	East end of WV 2 concurrency
Wetzel				WV 20 south – Clarksburg	
Wetzel	Cusicks Crossing			US 250 north – Cameron	West end of US 250 concurrency
Wetzel	Cottontown			US 250 south – Mannington	East end of US 250 concurrency
Monongalia	Blacksville			WV 218 north – Waynesburg (Pennsylvania)	west end of WV 218 concurrency
Monongalia				WV 218 south – Fairview	east end of WV 218 concurrency
Monongalia				US 19 north – Mount Morris (Pennsylvania)	west end of US 19 concurrecy
Monongalia				CR 19/24 (Chaplin Hill Road) to I-79 – Fairmont, Washington (Pennsylvania)	
Monongalia	Morgantown			WV 705 east (Patteson Drive)	
Monongalia	Morgantown			US 19 south (Pleasant Street) / US 119 south (University Avenue) to I-68 / I-79 – Westover	East end of US 19 concurrency; West end of US 119 concurrency
Monongalia	Morgantown			US 119 north (Spruce Street)	
Monongalia	Morgantown			CR 857 north (Hartman Run Road) – Airport	West end of CR 857 concurrency
Monongalia	Morgantown			CR 857 south (Greenbag Road)	east end of CR 857 concurrency
Monongalia	Morgantown			I-68 to I-79 – Cumberland (Maryland)	I-68 Exit 4
Preston	Reedsville			WV 92 south – Arthurdale, Belington	
Preston	Kingwood			WV 26 – Bruceton Mills, Fellowsville	
Preston	Caddell			WV 72 south – Rowlesburg	
Preston				MD 39 east – Oakland	Eastern terminus
1.000 mi = 1.609 km; 1.000 km = 0.621 mi: Concurrency terminus

== See also ==
- List of state highways in West Virginia
- List of highways numbered 7
- Wadestown Covered Bridge, formerly located along the route
