= Duffy, Ohio =

- Unincorporated community
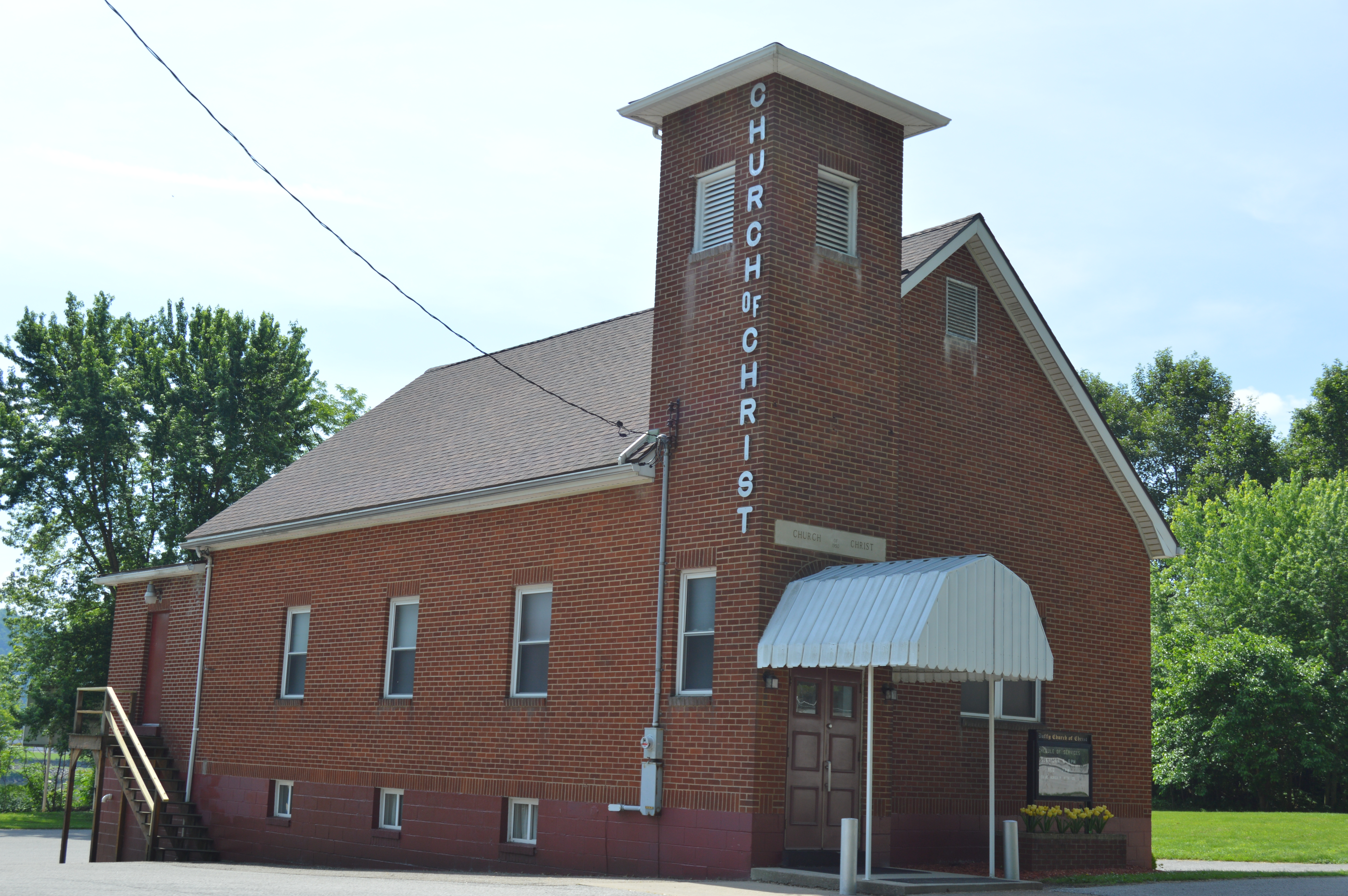
- Duffy Church of Christ

- Location within Ohio Location within the United States
- Coordinates: 39°38′38″N 80°52′19″W
- Country: United States
- State: Ohio
- County: Monroe
- Township: Ohio
- Elevation: 646 ft (197 m)
- Time zone: UTC-5 (Eastern (EST))
  - Summer (DST): UTC-4 (EDT)
- ZIP Code: 43946 (Sardis)
- Area codes: 740 & 220
- GNIS feature ID: 1075750

Duffy (also Texas) is an unincorporated community in Ohio Township, Monroe County, Ohio, United States.
