= George W. Martin (Missouri politician) =

American politician and educator (1838–1921)

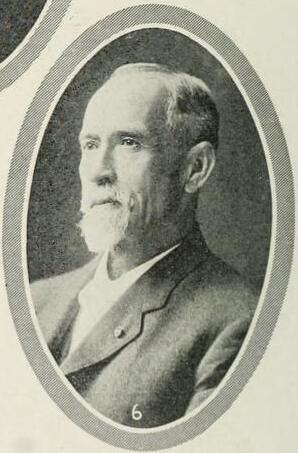
- Martin in a 1914 publication

Member of the Missouri House of Representatives from the Linn County district
- In office 1907–1908

Personal details
- Born: George Washington Martin; December 30, 1838 Sardis, Ohio, U.S.
- Died: December 18, 1921 (aged 82) Brookfield, Missouri, U.S.
- Resting place: Rose Hill Cemetery
- Spouse: Sarah J. Wilson (m. 1865; died 1900)
- Children: 3
- Occupation: Politician; businessman; educator

George Washington Martin (December 30, 1838 – December 18, 1921) was an American politician and educator from Missouri. He served as a member of the Missouri House of Representatives in 1907.

== Early life ==
George Washington Martin was born on December 30, 1838, in Sardis, Ohio. At the age of 16, he taught in schools in Monroe County.

== Career ==
In the 1850s, Martin moved to Missouri and taught school in Lincoln and Montgomery counties for three years. He then returned to Ohio.

Martin enlisted in Company B of the 25th Ohio Infantry Regiment. He was promoted to first lieutenant on August 16, 1862, and was in command of his company at the battles of Chancellorsville, Greenbriar, Camp Allegheny, McDowell, Second Bull Run and Gettysburg. He was wounded during the battles of Allegheny and McDowell. He was severely wounded at the Battle of Chancellorsville. At the Battle of Gettysburg, he was shot and lost his right arm. He was mustered out following his injury on October 26, 1863, and continued serving at regimental headquarters as quartermaster until the spring of 1865. After his discharge, he was appointed sutler of the 116th Ohio Infantry Regiment. He was appointed purveyor of the first brigade of the first division of the Army of West Virginia and remained with them until the close of the war.

Martin moved back to Missouri and worked in mercantile business in Brookfield. He was superintendent of public schools and was elected and served as county assessor for two years. He was then elected as county clerk and held that role for 18 consecutive years. He was department commander of the Department of Missouri, Grand Army of the Republic from 1891 to 1892. He was elected to the Missouri House of Representatives, representing Linn County in 1907. He was appointed postmaster in 1911. In 1890, he became owner and publisher of The Brookfield Gazette. He also served as its editor. He engaged in real estate and was appointed land agent of the Hannibal and St. Joseph Railroad.

== Personal life ==
Martin married Sarah J. Wilson, of Wheeling, West Virginia, on October 24, 1865. They had three children, Georgia, William W. and Charles Martin. His wife died in 1900. He was a member of the Methodist Episcopal Church. He lived on North Main in Brookfield.

Martin died on December 18, 1921, in Brookfield. He was buried in Rose Hill Cemetery.
