= Jackson Township, Monroe County, Ohio =

Township in Ohio, US

- Township
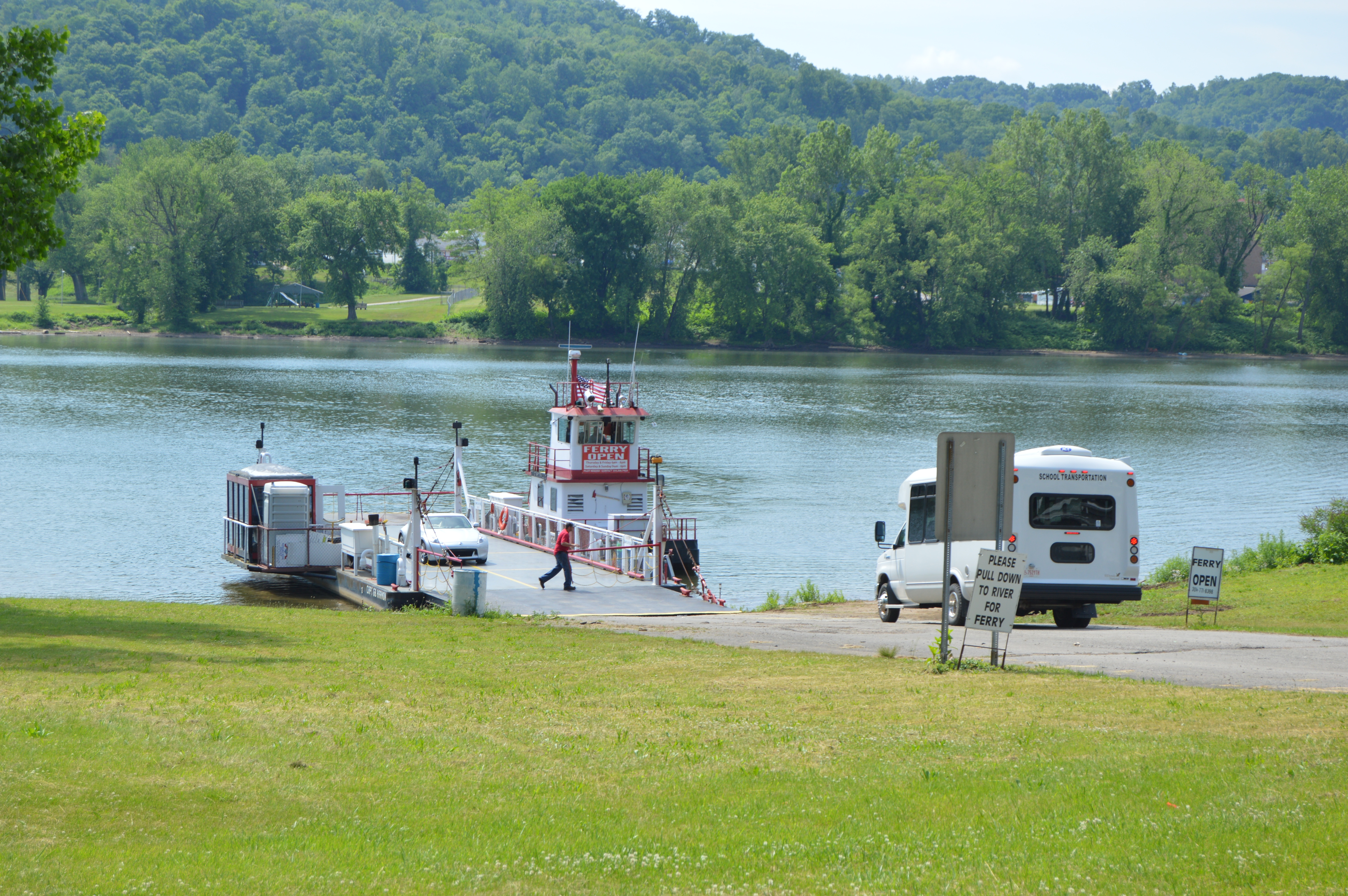
- Preparing to board the Sistersville Ferry at Fly

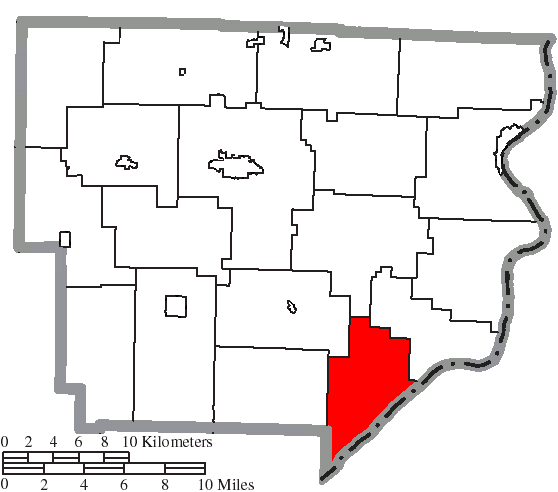
- Location of Jackson Township in Monroe County
- Coordinates: 39°36′37″N 81°0′11″W
- Country: United States
- State: Ohio
- County: Monroe

Area
  - Total: 20.2 sq mi (52.2 km^{2})
  - Land: 19.9 sq mi (51.5 km^{2})
  - Water: 0.27 sq mi (0.7 km^{2})
- Elevation: 1,175 ft (358 m)

Population (2020)
  - Total: 411
  - Density: 20.7/sq mi (7.98/km^{2})
- Time zone: UTC-5 (Eastern (EST))
  - Summer (DST): UTC-4 (EDT)
- FIPS code: 39-37898
- GNIS feature ID: 1086652

Jackson Township is one of the eighteen townships of Monroe County, Ohio, United States. As of the 2020 census, the population was 411.

== Geography ==
Located in the far southern part of the county along the Ohio River, it borders the following townships:

- Green Township - north
- Lee Township - northeast
- Grandview Township, Washington County - southwest
- Benton Township - west
- Perry Township - northwest

West Virginia lies across the Ohio River to the southeast: Wetzel County farther north, and Tyler County farther south.

No municipalities are located in Jackson Township.

== Name and history ==
It is one of thirty-seven Jackson Townships statewide.

== Government ==
The township is governed by a three-member board of trustees, who are elected in November of odd-numbered years to a four-year term beginning on the following January 1. Two are elected in the year after the presidential election and one is elected in the year before it. There is also an elected township fiscal officer, who serves a four-year term beginning on April 1 of the year after the election, which is held in November of the year before the presidential election. Vacancies in the fiscal officership or on the board of trustees are filled by the remaining trustees.
