= First United Methodist Church (Woodsfield, Ohio) =

Historic church in Ohio, United States

- U.S. National Register of Historic Places
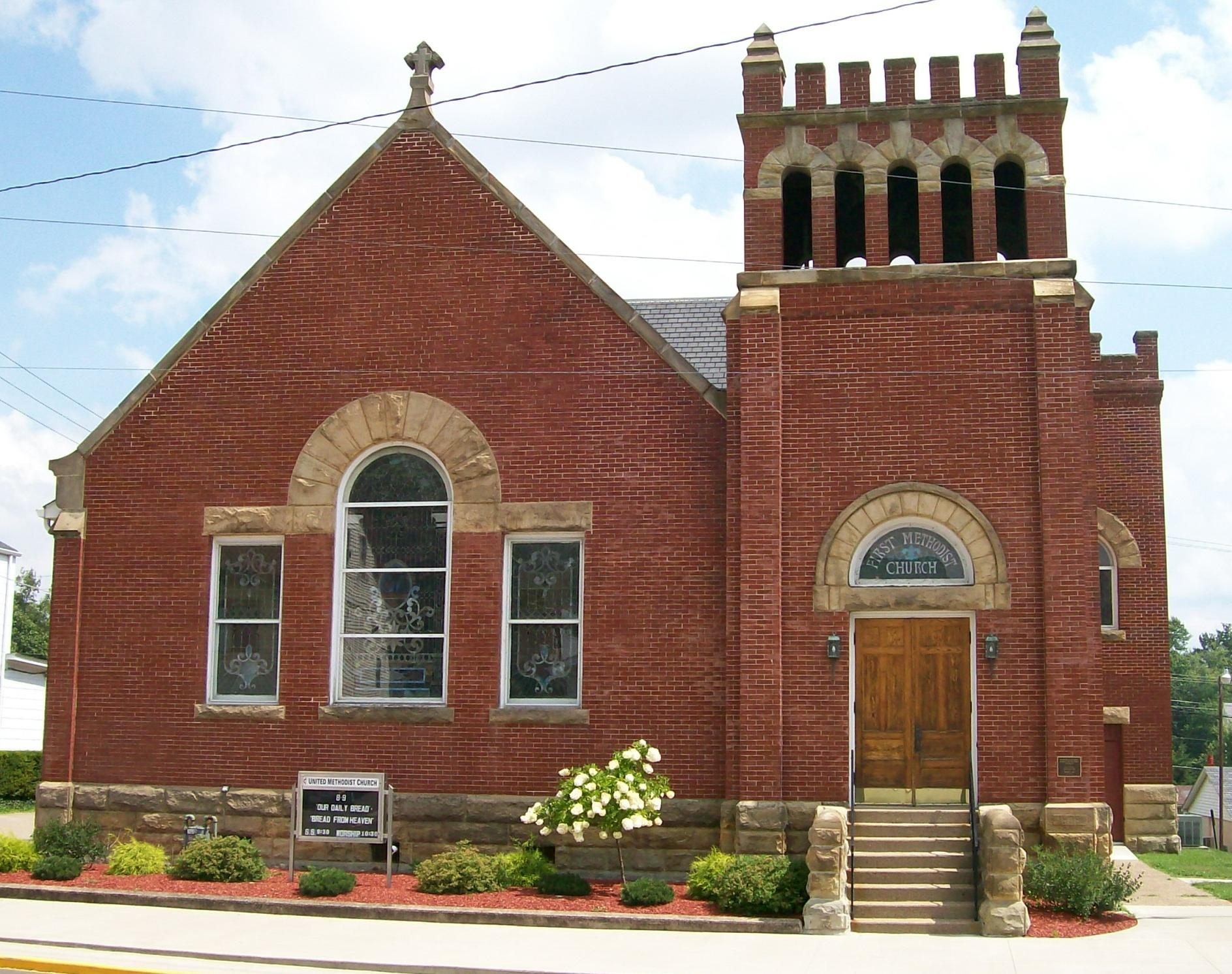
- The United Methodist Church in Woodsfield, Ohio

- Location within Ohio Location within the United States
- Location: 136 N. Main St., Woodsfield, Ohio
- Coordinates: 39°45′49″N 81°6′54″W
- Area: less than one acre
- Built: 1899
- Architect: Hubbar, Helbling & Co.; Detweiler, Merno S.,
- Architectural style: Romanesque, Late Gothic Revival
- NRHP reference No.: 06000694
- Added to NRHP: August 09, 2006

The First United Methodist Church is located at 136 Main Street in Woodsfield, Ohio. The property was placed on the National Register on 2006-08-09.

== History ==
The first Methodists recorded in Monroe County were reported in the early 19th century. The congregation met in an upstairs courtroom in a log courthouse that stood where the present brick courthouse is today. Needing more room, the Methodist Episcopal Church purchased a lot on Sycamore Street and constructed a simple wooden structure in 1825. This church was the first built in Woodsfield. The wooden structure was an 18 foot high, one story building with a central door framed by a window on either side, with three windows on the side facade. To the left of the church the congregation buried their dead in what is now called Pioneer Cemetery.

The congregation again grew to the point that the structure was no longer suitable. The church then purchased a lot on Main Street and constructed a red brick structure in 1834. The old church was sold to the Presbyterians in 1836 but did not survive to today. The church was again experiencing growing pains and built a second larger church on the same lot and was dedicated in 1860.

For a fourth time the church was again in need of a larger structure and the church contracted Hubbar, Helbling & Co. to build a new larger structure using the material from the old church. This church exceeded $8,000 to build and was completed in 1899. Over time the church expanded and an addition was added in 1907, and included the church offices and school-rooms. The church changed names in 1968 from the Methodist Episcopal Church to the First United Methodist Church after joining with the United Brethren churches.

== Exterior ==
The exterior features a mixture of the Richardsonian Romanesque style and the Late Gothic Revival architecture and consists of reddish brown brick on a sandstone foundation. The belltower features crenellated battlements and was added in 1907. The facade contains arched windows; the stained glass windows were purchased by the Busy Bee Sunday School class and were brought into town on the O.R.&W. Railroad. The windows contain the names of the girls of the Sunday school class. The pitched gable roof is lined with slate tiles.
