= Hollister-Parry House =

Historic house in Ohio, United States

- U.S. National Register of Historic Places
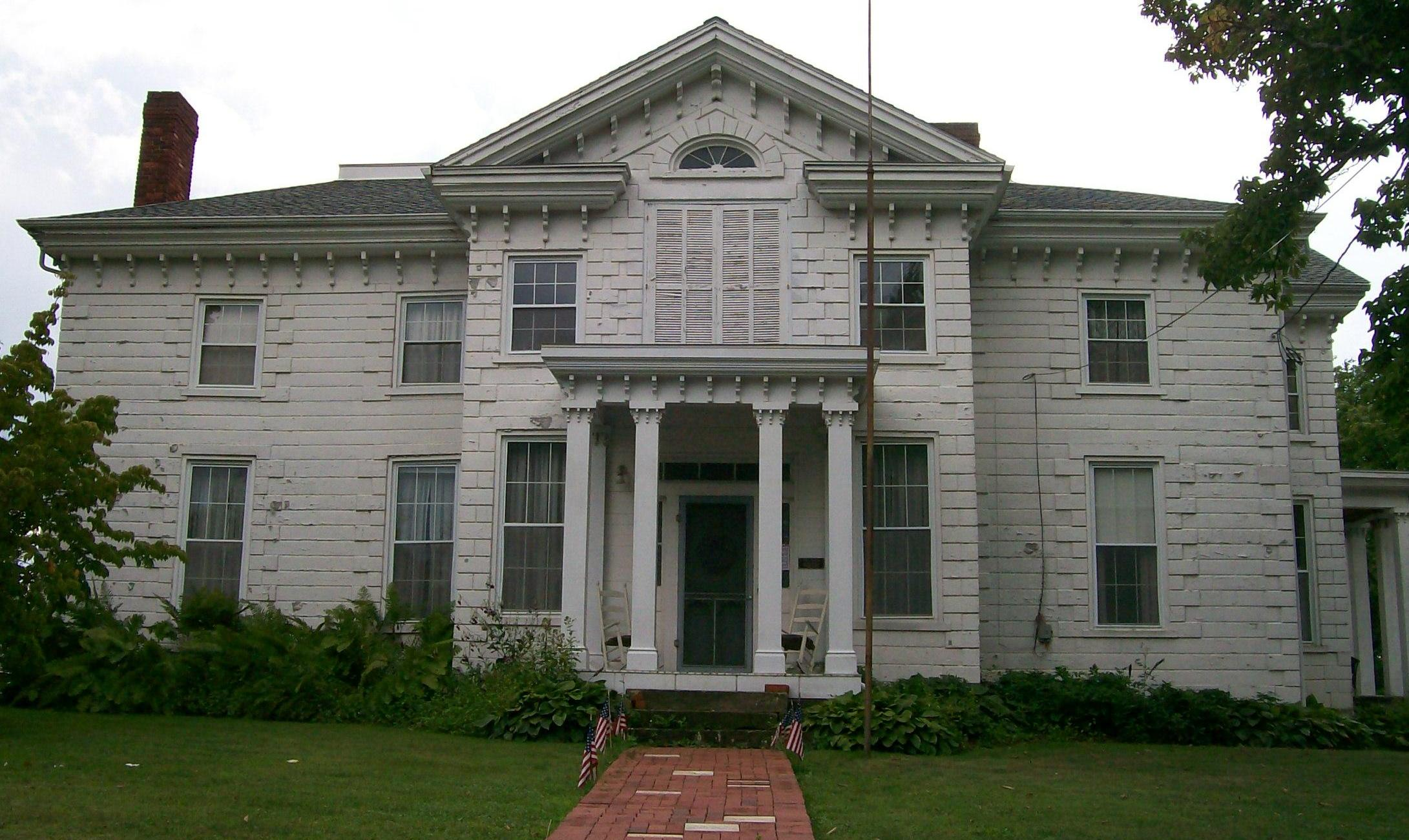
- Front of the house

- Location within Ohio Location within the United States
- Location: 217 Eastern Ave., Woodsfield, Ohio
- Coordinates: 39°45′43″N 81°6′45″W
- Area: 4 acres (1.6 ha)
- Built: 1859
- Architectural style: Italian Villa
- NRHP reference No.: 80003166
- Added to NRHP: April 16, 1980

The Hollister-Parry House is a historic residence in the village of Woodsfield, Ohio, United States. Built in the middle of the 19th century, it has been named a historic site and converted into a museum.

The house is named for two of its most prominent early residents, Nathan Hollister and J.R. Parry, M.D. Hollister was the house's first resident; one of Monroe County's leading lawyers, he arranged for the house's construction in 1859. Thirty years later, the property was sold to Parry, a doctor whose family owned it until 1974.

Built with weatherboarded walls, the two-story house features a small single-story portico over the entrance. The house's central section is divided into three bays: windows fill the side bays on both stories, while the central bay is occupied by an entrance on the first floor and a larger window on the second. This section of the house rises to a gable centering on a small fanlight, while the house's brackets and cornice form a pediment at the top of the gable. A similar portico is placed on the house's western side. Another distinctive component of the architecture is the weatherboarding: although made of wood, the house's exterior has been shaped to resemble the appearance of ashlar decorated with quoins. These elements, together with the house's blockish shape, combine to give it the appearance of an Italianate residence with Neo-Renaissance influences.

Since the days of the Parry family, the house has ceased to be used for residential purposes; it has been converted into a historic house museum, the Parry Museum. It was also recognized for its historic value in 1980, when it was added to the National Register of Historic Places; it is one of ten National Register-listed locations in Monroe County. The house qualified for addition to the Register because of its historically significant architecture, as its high-style architecture creates a vast difference between it and the otherwise largely vernacular appearance of Woodsfield's built environment.
