= Ohio State Route 148 =

State highway in Belmont County, Ohio, US

State Route 148

Route information
- Maintained by ODOT
- Length: 26.97 mi (43.40 km)
- Existed: 1923–present

Major junctions
- West end: SR 800 near Barnesville
- East end: SR 7 in Powhatan Point

Location
- Country: United States
- State: Ohio
- Counties: Belmont

Highway system
- Ohio State Highway System; Interstate; US; State; Scenic
← SR 147	→ SR 149

State Route 148 (SR 148) is an east–west state highway in eastern Ohio. Existing entirely in the southern portion of Belmont County, SR 148 has its western terminus at SR 800 approximately two miles (3.2 km) south of Barnesville. The eastern terminus of SR 148 is at SR 7 in Powhatan Point. From the SR 26 intersection easterly to its endpoint at SR 7, SR 148 generally runs in parallel to the Captina Creek.

In Powhatan Point, SR 148 intersects SR 7 twice. The signed portion of SR 148 comes to an end at the first (southernmost) intersection with SR 7. However, the Ohio Department of Transportation defines SR 148 as continuing as an unsigned route through Powhatan Point, following Front Street, Water Street, Fillmore Street, Second Street and Main Street through the village to its defined eastern terminus at its northern junction with SR 7 in the northern end of the village.

== Route description ==
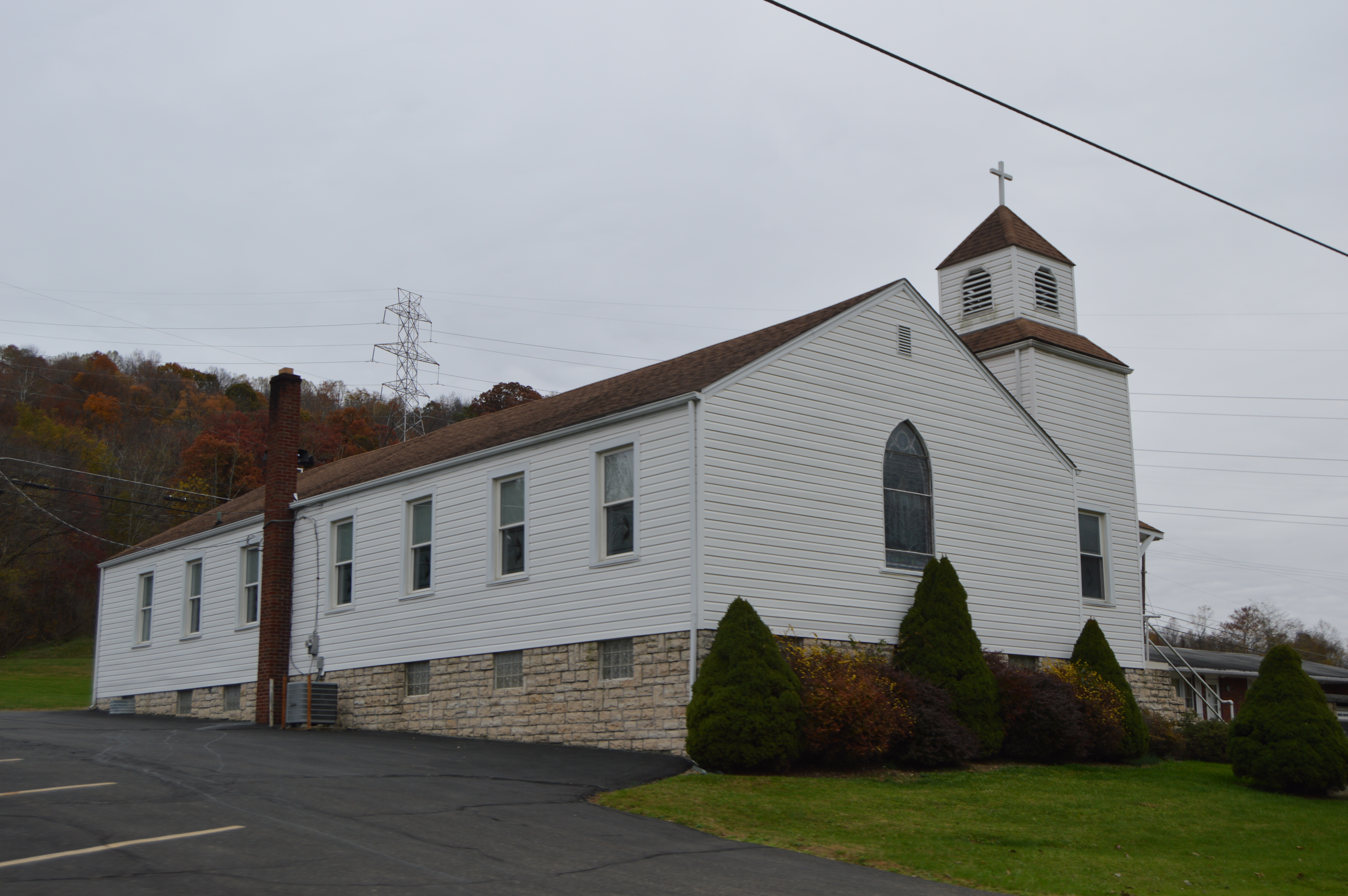
Methodist church at Steinersville

No part of SR 148 is incorporated within the National Highway System.

== History ==
SR 148 was commissioned in 1923, between Cambridge and Powhatan Point. In 1927, the western terminus was moved to its current location, south of Barnesville. The western terminus was extended west to an intersection with SR 147, in 1939. Between 1942 and 1944 the western terminus was moved back to its current location.

== Major intersections ==
The entire route is in Belmont County.

Location	mi	km	Destinations	Notes
Warren Township	0.00	0.00	SR 800 – Barnesville, Woodsfield	Western terminus
Wayne Township	5.56	8.95	SR 26 south / CR 26 – Woodsfield, Barkcamp State Park	Northern terminus of SR 26
Washington Township	11.78	18.96	SR 145 south – Beallsville	Northern terminus of SR 145
Washington Township	15.59	25.09	SR 9 north – St. Clairsville	Southern terminus of SR 9
Powhatan Point	25.71	41.38	SR 7 (Ohio River Highway) – Clarington, Bellaire	Eastern end of signed portion of SR 148
Powhatan Point	26.97	43.40	SR 7 (Ohio River Highway)	Eastern overall terminus
1.000 mi = 1.609 km; 1.000 km = 0.621 mi
