= Ohio State Route 537 =

State highway in Monroe County, Ohio, US

State Route 537

Route information
- Maintained by ODOT
- Length: 4.98 mi (8.01 km)
- Existed: 1937–present

Major junctions
- West end: SR 260 / CR 68 near Sycamore Valley
- East end: SR 26 near Graysville

Location
- Country: United States
- State: Ohio
- Counties: Monroe

Highway system
- Ohio State Highway System; Interstate; US; State; Scenic
| ← SR 536 | → SR 538 |

State Route 537 (SR 537) is a short east–west state highway in southeastern Ohio. At a length of just shy of five miles (8.0 km), SR 537 is located entirely within southwestern Monroe County. The state route's western terminus is at SR 260 approximately three and a half miles (5.6 km) southeast of the unincorporated community of Sycamore Valley, and its eastern terminus is at SR 26 one mile (1.6 km) south of the village limits of Graysville.

== Route description ==
SR 537 begins at the rural southwestern Monroe County intersection of SR 260 and County Road 68 (CR 68), the latter also called Big Injun Road, approximately three and a half miles (5.6 km) southeast of Sycamore Valley in the hamlet of Marr. For its entire length, the state highway follows a hilly, curvey routing through Wayne National Forest, with the occasional home and patch of open space. From the SR 260 intersection, SR 537 runs northeasterly, then bends in a "U" shape through an open field within an otherwise forested region, heading south and back to the north, then resumes a northeasterly path before curving to the north. SR 537 straddles the boundary between Bethel Township and Washington Township up through the CR 13 intersection, before weaving its way in a generally southeasterly trend to the Township Highway 307 intersection. SR 537 turns easterly there, then bends back to the northeast. After crossing CR 73, the state highway turns back to the southeast, then bends back north, and finally to the northeast as it arrives at its junction with SR 26, a T-intersection located one mile (1.6 km) south of Graysville that serves as its endpoint.

State Route 537 is not included as a part of the National Highway System.

== History ==
SR 537 was first designated in 1937 along the routing that it currently occupies between SR 260 and SR 26. No major changes have taken place to the state highway since its creation.

== Major intersections ==
The entire route is in Monroe County.

| Location | mi | km | Destinations | Notes |
|---|---|---|---|---|
| Bethel Township | 0.00 | 0.00 | SR 260 / CR 68 | |
| Washington Township | 4.98 | 8.01 | SR 26 | |
1.000 mi = 1.609 km; 1.000 km = 0.621 mi
