= Bethel Township, Ohio =

Bethel Township, Ohio, may refer to:

- Bethel Township, Clark County, Ohio
- Bethel Township, Miami County, Ohio
- Bethel Township, Monroe County, Ohio
