= Quarry, Ohio =

Coordinates: 39°35′31″N 81°13′14″W

Quarry is a ghost town in Monroe County, Ohio, United States. The location is currently within Wayne National Forest.

The location for Quarry is 784 ft (239 m) above sea level.

Nearby communities include Devola, Marietta, and Parkersburg, West Virginia.
