= Laings, Ohio =

Unincorporated community in Ohio, U.S.

Coordinates: 39°43′01″N 81°00′44″W

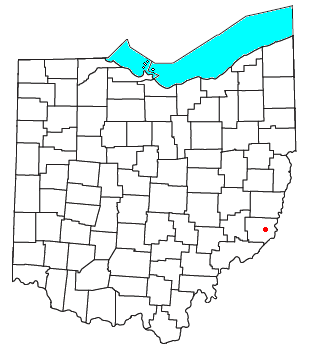
Location of Laings, Ohio

Laings is an unincorporated community in central Green Township, Monroe County, Ohio, United States. It has a post office with the ZIP code 43752. It lies along State Route 255.

== History ==
The post office in Lines has been operating since 1832.
