= 25th Ohio Infantry Regiment =

- Active: June 28, 1861, to June 18, 1866
- Country: United States
- Allegiance: Union
- Branch: Union Army
- Type: Infantry
- Engagements: Battle of Cheat Mountain; Battle of Greenbrier River; Battle of Camp Alleghany; Battle of McDowell; Battle of Cross Keys; Battle of Cedar Mountain; Battle of Freeman's Ford; Second Battle of Bull Run; Battle of Chancellorsville; Battle of Gettysburg; Battle of Honey Hill; Battle of Tulifinny; Battle of Dingle's Mill

The 25th Ohio Infantry Regiment was an infantry regiment in the Union Army during the American Civil War.

== Service ==
The 25th Ohio Infantry Regiment was organized at Camp Chase in Columbus, Ohio and mustered in for three years service on June 28, 1861, under the command of Colonel James A. Jones. On March 17, 1862, Company G was permanently detached and redesignated the 12th Ohio Battery.

The regiment was attached to Cheat Mountain, District West Virginia, to November 1861. Milroy's Command, Cheat Mountain, District West Virginia, to April 1862. Milroy's Brigade, Department of the Mountains, to June 1862. 2nd Brigade, 1st Division, I Corps, Army of Virginia, to September 1862. 2nd Brigade, 1st Division, XI Corps, Army of the Potomac, to August 1863. 2nd Brigade, Gordon's Division, Folly Island, South Carolina, X Corps, Department of the South, to January 1864. District of Hilton Head, South Carolina, X Corps, Department of the South, to April 1864. District of Hilton Head, South Carolina, Department of the South, to October 1864. 3rd Separate Brigade, Department of the South, to November 1864. 1st Brigade, Coast Division, Department of the South, to February 1865. 3rd Separate Brigade, Hilton Head, South Carolina, Department of the South, to March 1865. 1st Separate Brigade, District of Charleston, South Carolina, Department of the South, to August 1865. 4th Separate Brigade, District of Western South Carolina, Department of the South, to January 1866. Department of the South to June 1866.

The 25th Ohio Infantry mustered out of service on June 18, 1866.

== Detailed service ==
Ordered to western Virginia July 29, and duty along the Baltimore & Ohio Railroad from Grafton to the Ohio River, until August 21. Moved to Cheat Mountain Summit, Va., August 21, 1861, and duty there August 25-November 25. Operations on Cheat Mountain September 11–17. Action at Cheat Mountain September 12. Greenbrier River October 3–4. Duty at Huttonsville November 25, 1861, to February 27, 1862. Expedition to Camp Baldwin December 11–13, 1861. Action at Camp Allegheny, Buffalo Mountain, December 12. Expedition to Huntersville December 31, 1861, to January 6, 1862. Duty at Beverly, Cheat Mountain, March. Expedition on the Seneca April 1–12. Action at Monterey April 12. At Staunton until May 7. Battle of McDowell May 8. March from Franklin to Strasburg May 26-June 10, pursuing Jackson up the Shenandoah Valley. Battle of Cross Keys June 8. Duty at Sperryville and Centreville, Va., until August. Battle of Cedar Mountain August 9. Pope's Campaign in northern Virginia August 16-September 2. Freeman's Ford August 22. Battle of Bull Run August 29–30. Duty in the defenses of Washington, D.C., until December. Expedition from Centreville to Bristoe September 25–28. March to Fredericksburg, Va., December 10–16. "Mud March" January 20–24, 1863. At Brook's Station until April 27. Chancellorsville Campaign April 27-May 6. Battle of Chancellorsville May 1–5. Gettysburg Campaign June 11-July 22. Battle of Gettysburg, July 1–3. Pursuit of Lee, to Manassas Gap, Va., July 5–24. At Warrenton Junction July 25-August 6. Moved to Folly Island, S.C., August 6–12. Duty at Folly and Morris Islands, S.C., operating against Fort Sumter and Charleston until January 1864. Duty at Hilton Head, S.C., until November 23, 1864. (Veterans absent on furlough January to March 1864. Companies A, G, and I at Fort Pulaski, Ga., September 25 to October 23.) Expedition against Charleston & Savannah Railroad November 28–30. Battle of Honey Hill November 30. Coosaw River December 4. Demonstration on Charleston & Savannah Railroad December 6–9. Deveaux's Neck December 6. Occupation of Charleston February 26, 1865. Expedition toward Santee River February 28-March 10. Camp at Mt. Pleasant March 12-April 3. Potter's Expedition to Camden, S.C., April 5–25. Dingle's Mills April 9. Statesburg April 15. Occupation of Camden April 17. Boykins' Mills April 18. Denkins' Mills and Beach Creek near Statesburg April 19. Return to Mt. Pleasant April 28, then moved to Charleston May 6 and to Columbia May 7, and garrison duty there until May 25. Duty in Fairfield, Newberry, Edgefield, Lexington and Richland Counties until April 1866. At Summerville until May and duty on the Sea Islands until June. Ordered to Tod's Barracks, Ohio, June 6.

== Casualties ==
The regiment lost a total of 280 men during service; 7 officers and 151 enlisted men killed or mortally wounded, 3 officers and 119 enlisted men died of disease.

== Commanders ==
- Colonel James A. Jones - resigned May 16, 1862
- Colonel William Pitt Richardson - commanded at the battles of McDowell and Cross Keys as lieutenant colonel; brevet brigadier general, December 7, 1864; discharged May 9, 1866 by order of War Department
- Lieutenant Colonel Jeremiah Williams - commanded at the Battle of Chancellorsville as major; commanded at the Battle of Gettysburg, wounded and captured
- Lieutenant Colonel Nathaniel Haughton - commanded at the Battle of Honey Hill
- Captain Nathaniel J. Manning - commanded at the Battle of Gettysburg
- Lieutenant William Maloney - commanded at the Battle of Gettysburg
- Lieutenant Israel White - commanded at the Battle of Gettysburg
- Lieutenant George W. Martin
- Major Edward C. Culp

== See also ==
- List of Ohio Civil War units
- Ohio in the Civil War
