= New Martinsville Bridge =

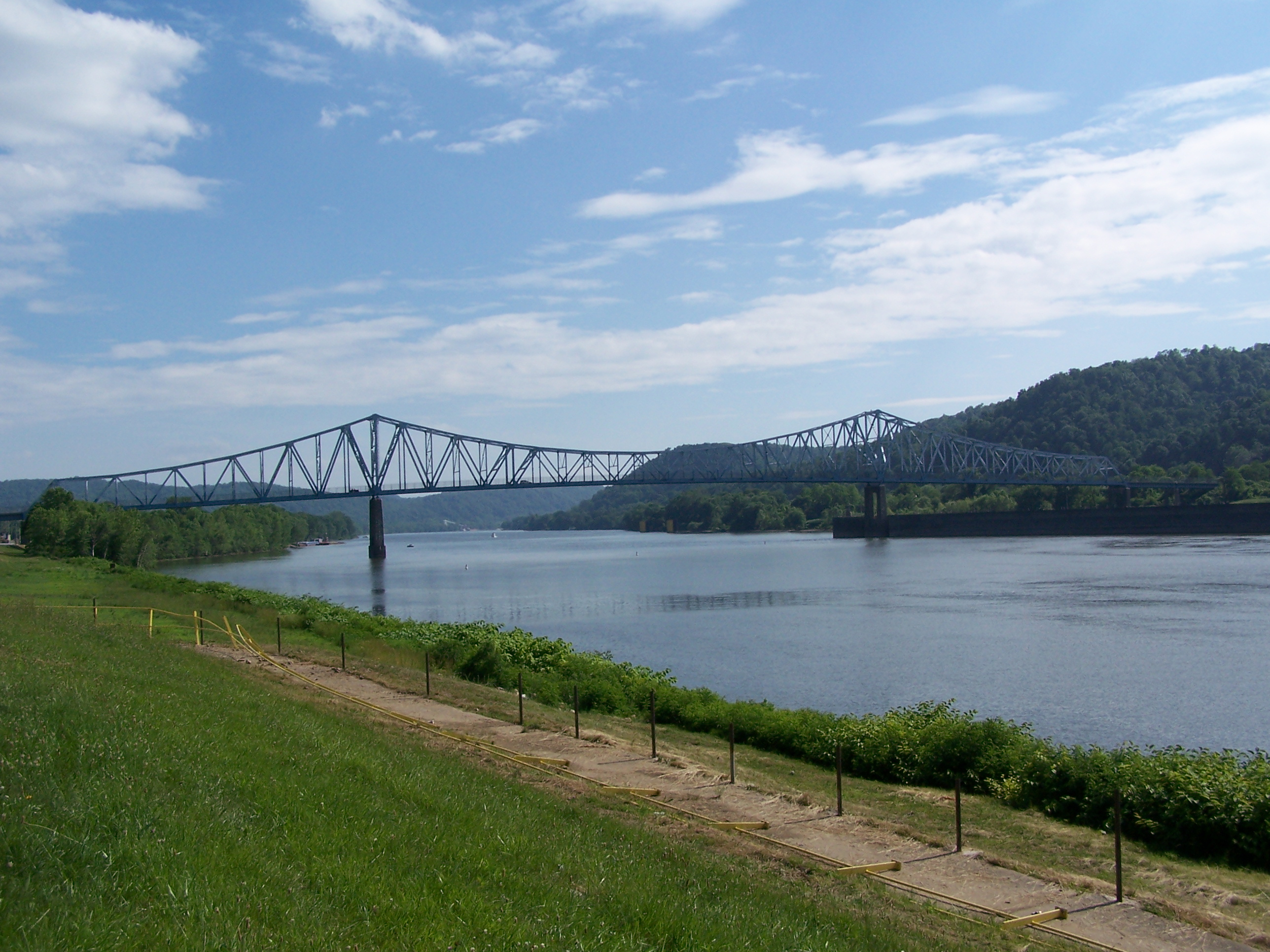
- New Martinsville Bridge in 2005.
- Coordinates: 39°39′33″N 80°51′48″W
- Carries: 2 lanes of WV 7/ SR 536
- Crosses: Ohio River
- Locale: New Martinsville, West Virginia and Hannibal, Ohio
- Maintained by: West Virginia Department of Transportation
- ID number: 00000000052A007

Characteristics
- Design: steel through truss
- Total length: 2,100 feet (640.1 m)
- Width: 27.5 feet (8.4 m)
- Longest span: 721.8 feet (220.0 m)
- Clearance below: 75 feet (22.9 m) over Ohio River

History
- Opened: 1961

Statistics
- Daily traffic: 8,200 (2005)

Location
- Interactive map of New Martinsville Bridge

The New Martinsville Bridge, or the Korean War Veterans Memorial Bridge, is a steel through truss bridge over the Ohio River between West Virginia and Ohio. It carries West Virginia Route 7 over the river between Hannibal, Ohio and New Martinsville, West Virginia.

== See also ==
- List of crossings of the Ohio River
