= Charles A. Lory =

President of Colorado State University (1909 - 1940)

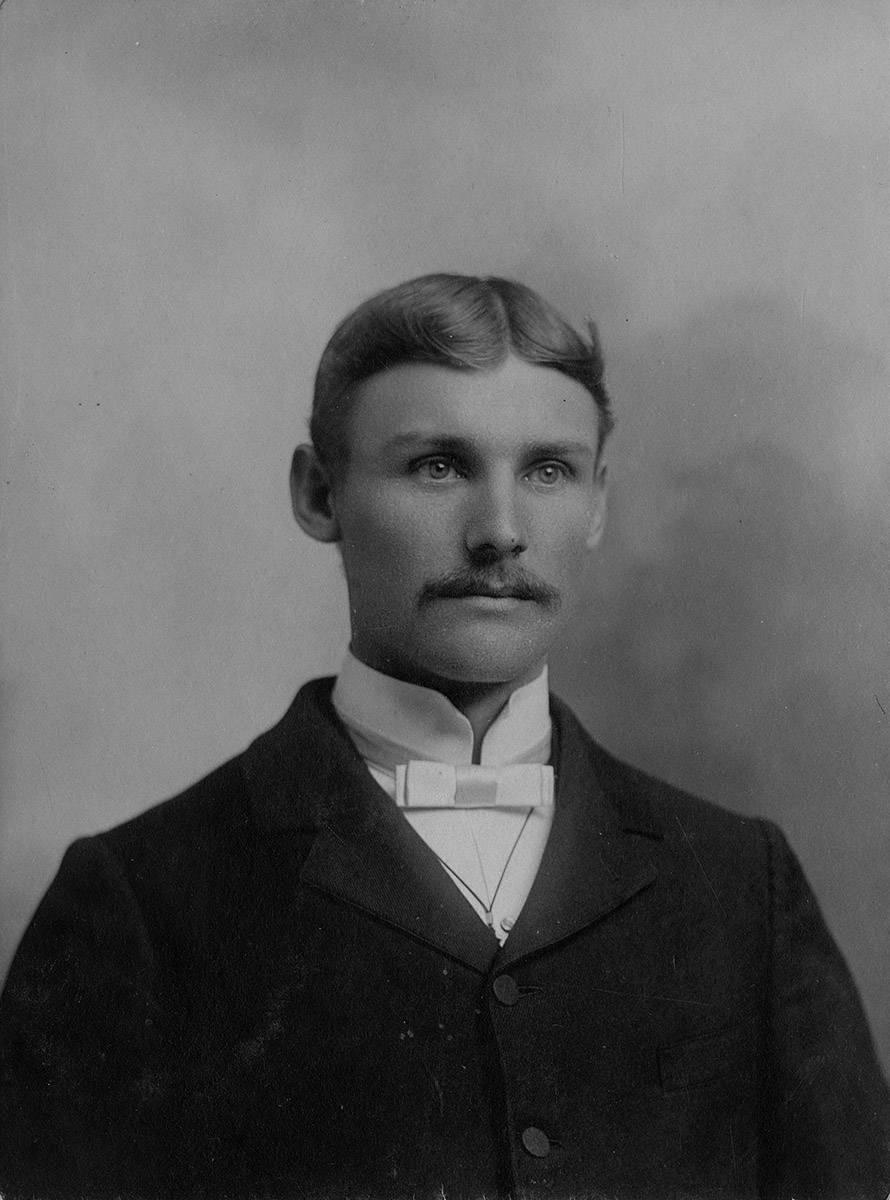
- Lory in 1898

President of Colorado State University
- In office 1909–1940
- Preceded by: Barton O. Aylesworth
- Succeeded by: Roy M. Green

Personal details
- Born: September 25, 1872 Sardis, Ohio, US
- Died: December 30, 1969 (aged 97) Fort Collins, Colorado, US
- Education: University of Colorado Boulder
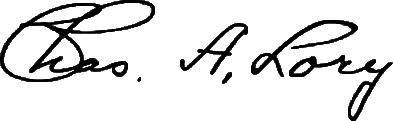
- Signature

Charles Alfred Lory (1872–1969) was an American academic administrator.

== Career ==
Lory was born in Sardis, Ohio on September 25, 1872. On June 5, 1902, Charles A Lory received an M.S. degree in physics, the first graduate degree in physics at the University of Colorado Boulder. He served as the president of Colorado State University from 1909 to 1940.

He died in Fort Collins, Colorado on December 30, 1969.
