= 116th Ohio Infantry Regiment =

- Active: September 18, 1862, to June 14, 1865
- Country: United States
- Allegiance: Union
- Branch: Infantry
- Engagements: Second Battle of Winchester; Battle of New Market; Battle of Piedmont; Battle of Lynchburg; Battle of Cool Spring; Second Battle of Kernstown; Battle of Summit Point; Battle of Berryville; Battle of Opequon; Battle of Fisher's Hill; Battle of Cedar Creek; Siege of Petersburg; Appomattox Campaign; Third Battle of Petersburg; Battle of Appomattox Court House

The 116th Ohio Infantry Regiment, sometimes 116th Ohio Volunteer Infantry (or 116th OVI) was an infantry regiment in the Union Army during the American Civil War.

== Service ==
The 116th Ohio Infantry was organized Marietta and Gallipolis, Ohio, and mustered in September 18, 1862, for three years service under the command of Colonel James Washburn. Companies F and K mustered in October 28, 1862, and joined regiment at Buckhannon, Virginia.

The regiment was attached to Railroad Division, West Virginia, to January 1863. Romney, West Virginia, Defenses of the Upper Potomac, VIII Corps, Middle Department, to March 1863. 1st Brigade, 2nd Division, VIII Corps, Middle Department, to June 1863. 1st Brigade, Elliott's Command, VIII Corps, to July 1863. 1st Brigade, 1st Division, Department of the Susquehanna, July 1863. McReynolds' Command, Martinsburg, West Virginia, Department of West Virginia, to December 1863. 1st Brigade, 1st Division, West Virginia, to April 1864. 1st Brigade. 1st Infantry Division, West Virginia, to December 1864. 1st Brigade, Independent Division, XXIV Corps, Army of the James, to June 1865.

The 116th Ohio Infantry mustered out of service June 14, 1865, at Richmond, Virginia. Companies F and K were consolidated with the 62nd Ohio Infantry.

== Detailed service ==
This regiment was organized at Gallipolis and Marietta in Sept. and Oct.,1862, to serve for three years. On Oct. 16 it moved to Belpre, crossed the river to Parkersburg, and was immediately transported to Clarksburg, W. Va. Its first engagement was at Moorefield where it lost 2 or 3 men slightly wounded by fragments of shell, and about 20 were captured on the picket line. After a little scouting and foraging in the Moorefield Valley, the regiment moved to Romney, where it had about 50 men captured while guarding a forage train. In June Co. A and I participated in an engagement at Bunker Hill and lost about half their number in killed and captured, the remainder making their escape with great difficulty. It was comparatively idle, so far as fighting was concerned, until the spring of 1864, when it started up the Shenandoah Valley under Gen. Sigel. It participated in two charges at Piedmont losing 176 men killed and wounded, and at Lynchburg it also lost several men. The regiment fought with courage at Snicker's Ferry and participated in a charge which had much to do in deciding the fortunes of the day. At the Battle of Halltown it lost quite heavily and was engaged with slight loss at Berryville. It participated in the Battle of the Opequan, losing 4 killed and 22 wounded, and at the Battle of Fisher's Hill it charged a battery in the angle of the Confederate works, receiving the enemy's fire when only 100 yards distant, but rushed in and captured the battery in the very smoke of its discharge, losing 1 man killed and 4 wounded. It participated in the general engagement at Cedar creek and remained in that vicinity until December, when it joined the Army of the James. In the spring of 1865 it was engaged almost constantly, participated in the assault on Fort Gregg and then joined in the pursuit of the Confederates. It was mustered out on June 14, 1865.

== Casualties ==
The regiment lost a total of 185 men during service; 4 officers and 90 enlisted men killed or mortally wounded, 3 officers and 88 enlisted men died of disease.

== Commanders ==
- Colonel James Washburn
- Lieutenant Colonel Thomas F. Wildes - commanded at the battle of Opequon

== Notable members ==
- Corporal Freeman C. Thompson, Company F - Medal of Honor recipient for action at Petersburg, Virginia, April 2, 1865
- Lieutenant George W. Martin – member of the Missouri House of Representatives
- Private Joseph Van Matre, Company G - Medal of Honor recipient for action at Petersburg, Virginia, April 2, 1865

== See also ==
- List of Ohio Civil War units
- Ohio in the Civil War
