= Sardis, Ohio =

- Census-designated place
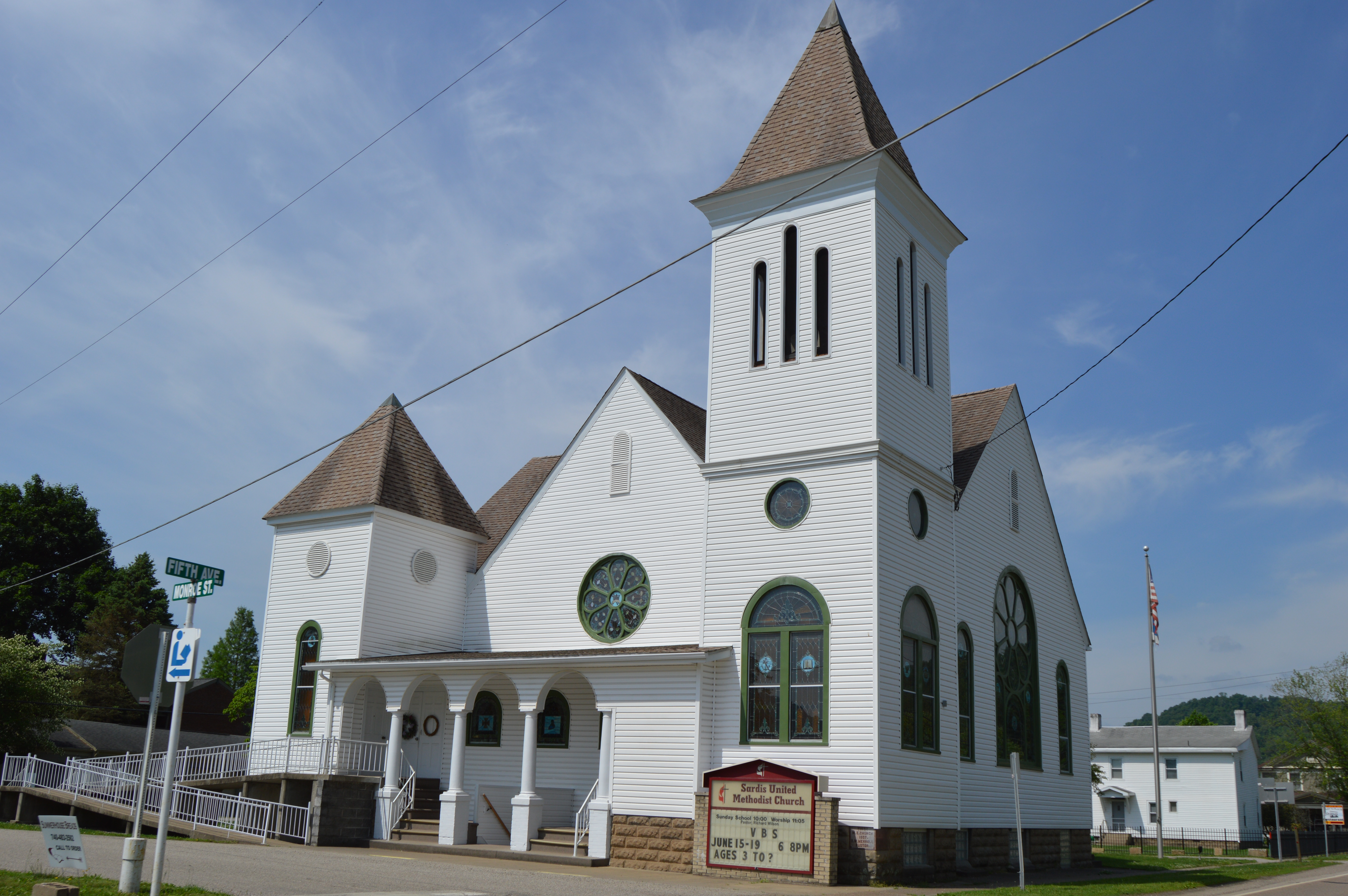
- Methodist church, Monroe and Fifth

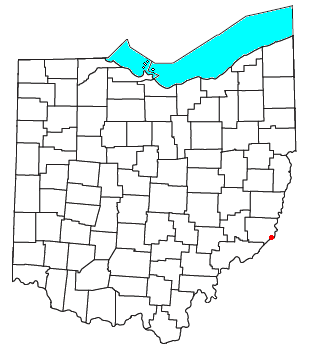
- Location in Ohio
- Coordinates: 39°37′26″N 80°54′20″W
- Country: United States
- State: Ohio
- County: Monroe
- Township: Lee

Area
  - Total: 1.26 sq mi (3.27 km^{2})
  - Land: 1.26 sq mi (3.27 km^{2})
  - Water: 0 sq mi (0.00 km^{2})
- Elevation: 1,034 ft (315 m)

Population (2020)
  - Total: 522
  - Density: 414.0/sq mi (159.86/km^{2})
- Time zone: UTC-5 (Eastern (EST))
  - Summer (DST): UTC-4 (EDT)
- ZIP Code: 43946
- FIPS code: 39-70548
- GNIS feature ID: 2628967

Sardis is an unincorporated community and census-designated place (CDP) in southeastern Lee Township, Monroe County, Ohio, United States. It has a post office with the ZIP code of 43946. As of the 2020 census, it had a population of 522.

== History ==
Among the early settlers in this area was Major Earl Sproat, one of the 48 members of the Ohio Company. The Ohio Company founded Marietta, the first permanent settlement in the Northwest Territory in 1788. The village of Sardis was laid out by James Patton in 1843.

Students from Sardis attend River Elementary and River High School in nearby Hannibal, and are served by the Switzerland of Ohio Local School District. This school is shared with other nearby riverfront communities, including Antioch, Duffy, Fly, Hannibal, Laings, Powhatan Point (of neighboring Belmont County), and Clarington.

== Geography ==
Sardis is at the intersection of Ohio State Routes 7 and 255, lying between Duffy and Fly. The community is bordered to the south by the Ohio River, which is the West Virginia state line. State Route 7 leads north (upriver) 5 miles (8 km) to Hannibal and southwest (downriver) 11 miles (18 km) to Matamoras. Woodsfield, the Monroe county seat, is 21 miles (34 km) to the northwest via state routes 255 and 26.

According to the U.S. Census Bureau, the Sardis CDP has a total area of 1.3 square miles (3.4 km^{2}), all land.

== Demographics ==
Historical population
Census	Pop.	Note	%±
2010	559		—
2020	522		−6.6%
U.S. Decennial Census

== Notable people ==
- Charles A. Lory (1872–1969), president of Colorado State University
- George W. Martin (1838–1921), member of the Missouri House of Representatives
