= Joseph Van Matre =

- Born: October 9, 1828; Mason County, (West) Virginia
- Died: January 14, 1892 (aged 63)
- Burial place: Middleport Hill Cemetery Middleport, Ohio
- Military career
- Allegiance: United States of America; Union
- Branch: United States Army; Union Army
- Rank: Private
- Units: Company G, 116th Ohio Infantry
- Awards: Medal of Honor

Joseph Van Matre (October 9, 1828 – January 14, 1892) was a United States Army soldier who received the Medal of Honor for his actions during the American Civil War.

== Biography ==
Joseph Van Matre was born on October 9, 1828, in Mason County, (West) Virginia. He was a member of the 116th Ohio Infantry during the American Civil War and was awarded the Medal of Honor on April 2, 1865, during the Third Battle of Petersburg. During the assault on Fort Gregg, Van Matre climbed upon the parapet and fired down into the fort as fast as the loaded guns could be passed to him. He died on January 14, 1892, and is buried in Middleport Hill Cemetery in Middleport, Ohio.

== Medal of Honor citation ==
Rank and organization: Private, Company G, 116th Ohio Infantry. Place and date: At Petersburg, Va., April 2, 1865. Entered service at: ------. Birth: Mason County, W. Va. Date of issue: May 12, 1865.

Citation:

In the assault on Fort Gregg, this soldier climbed upon the parapet and fired down into the fort as fast as the loaded guns could be passed up to him by comrades.

== See also ==
- List of Medal of Honor recipients
- List of American Civil War Medal of Honor recipients: T–Z
