= Ohio State Route 255 =

State highway in Monroe County, Ohio, US

State Route 255

Route information
- Maintained by ODOT
- Length: 18.08 mi (29.10 km)
- Existed: 1935–present

Major junctions
- West end: SR 800 near Woodsfield
- East end: SR 7 in Sardis

Location
- Country: United States
- State: Ohio
- Counties: Monroe

Highway system
- Ohio State Highway System; Interstate; US; State; Scenic
← SR 254	→ SR 256

State Route 255 (SR 255) is an east–west state route located in southeast Ohio. Nestled entirely inside the southeast quadrant of Monroe County, the western terminus of State Route 255 is at a T-intersection with State Route 800 approximately 3 miles (4.8 km) south of Woodsfield. Its eastern terminus is at State Route 7 in the hamlet of Sardis, which is situated along the banks of the Ohio River.

== History ==
SR 255 was commissioned in 1935 on the same alignment as it currently occupies. Paving of the route between SR 800 and the Little Muskingum River was completed between 1957 and 1959. The rest of the route was paved by 1961.

== Major intersections ==
The entire route is in Monroe County.

Location	mi	km	Destinations	Notes
Center Township	0.00	0.00	SR 800 – Fly, Woodsfield	
Lee Township	18.08	29.10	SR 7 (Fifth Avenue) / Muskingum Street – Clarington, Marietta	
1.000 mi = 1.609 km; 1.000 km = 0.621 mi
