= Monroe County Airport (Ohio) =

- IATA: none; ICAO: none; FAA LID: 4G5

Summary
- Airport type: Public
- Owner: County Commission
- Serves: Woodsfield, Ohio
- Location: Monroe County, Ohio
- Elevation AMSL: 1,197 ft / 365 m
- Coordinates: 39°46′45″N 081°06′10″W

Map
- Location of airport in Ohio 4G5 (the United States)

Runways
Direction	Length		Surface
Direction	ft	m	Surface
7/25	3,805	1,160	Asphalt

Statistics (2020)
- Aircraft operations (year ending 6/30/2020): 1,024
- Based aircraft: 14
- Source: Federal Aviation Administration

Monroe County Airport (FAA LID: 4G5) is a county-owned, public-use airport in Monroe County, Ohio, United States. located one nautical mile (2 km) north of the central business district of Woodsfield, Ohio. This airport is included in the National Plan of Integrated Airport Systems for 2011–2015, which categorized it as a general aviation facility.

== History ==
The airport was dedicated on 29 October 1967.

The Monroe County Pilots Association was formed in August 1978 to support the airport.

== Facilities and aircraft ==
Monroe County Airport covers an area of 105 acres (42 ha) at an elevation of 1,197 feet (365 m) above mean sea level. It has one runway designated 7/25 with an asphalt surface measuring 3,805 by 75 feet (1,160 x 23 m).

The airport has a fixed-base operator that sells avgas and jet fuel. It offers services such as rental cars and amenities such as WiFi, a conference room, vending machines, and television.

For the 12-month period ending June 30, 2020, the airport had 1,024 aircraft operations, an average of 20 per week: 94% general aviation, 5% military, and 1% air taxi. At that time there were 14 aircraft based at this airport: 10 single-engine airplanes and 4 helicopter.

== Accidents and incidents ==
- On Dec 5, 2022, an experimental Kitfox 5 crashed while attempting to land at the Monroe County Airport.

== See also ==
- List of airports in Ohio
