= Corinth, West Virginia =

Unincorporated community in West Virginia, United States

Corinth
- Unincorporated community
- Location within the state of West Virginia Corinth (the United States)
- Coordinates: 39°25′18″N 79°29′30″W
- Country: United States
- State: West Virginia
- County: Preston
- Elevation: 2,471 ft (753 m)
- Time zone: UTC-5 (Eastern (EST))
  - Summer (DST): UTC-4 (EDT)
- GNIS feature ID: 1537687

Corinth is an unincorporated community and coal town in Preston County, West Virginia, United States. Corinth was originally called Spencer but was changed in 1890 to avoid duplication of names in the state. It is named after the ancient Greek city of Corinth.
