= Green Township, Monroe County, Ohio =

Township in Ohio, US

- Township
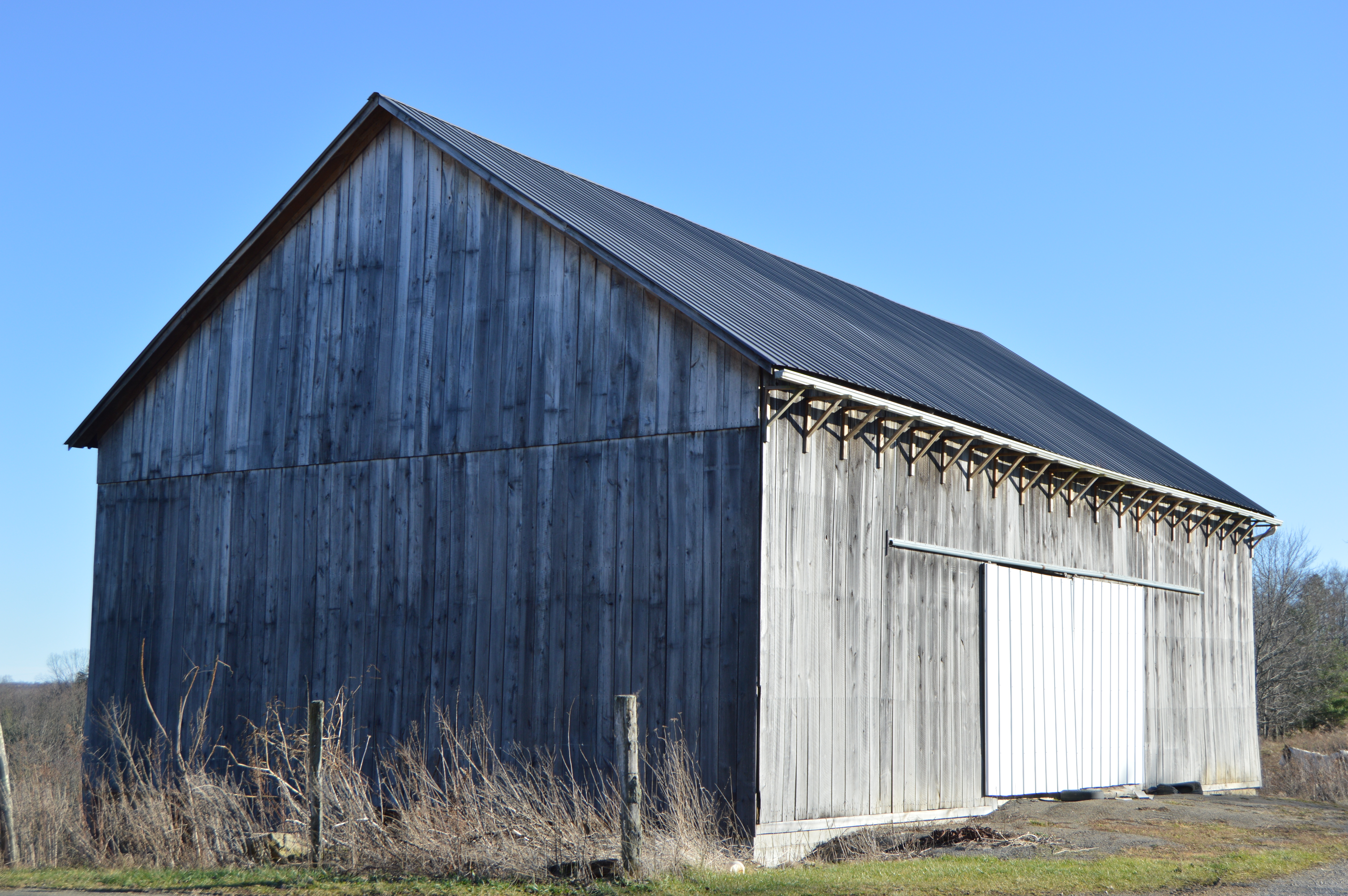
- Bank barn on Flauhaus Road

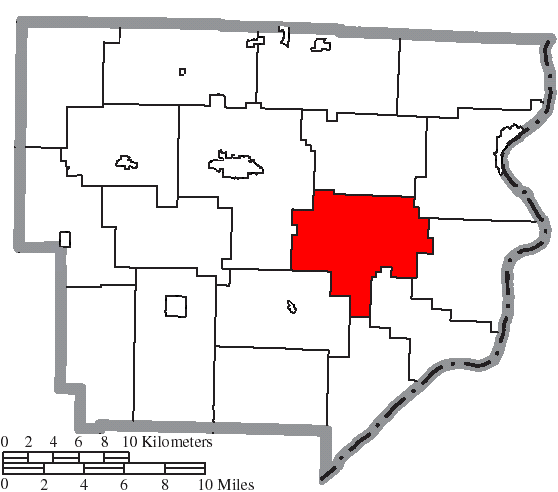
- Location of Green Township in Monroe County
- Coordinates: 39°41′44″N 81°0′35″W
- Country: United States
- State: Ohio
- County: Monroe

Area
  - Total: 27.7 sq mi (71.7 km^{2})
  - Land: 27.7 sq mi (71.7 km^{2})
  - Water: 0 sq mi (0.0 km^{2})
- Elevation: 1,033 ft (315 m)

Population (2020)
  - Total: 419
  - Density: 15.1/sq mi (5.84/km^{2})
- Time zone: UTC-5 (Eastern (EST))
  - Summer (DST): UTC-4 (EDT)
- FIPS code: 39-31808
- GNIS feature ID: 1086651

Green Township is one of the eighteen townships of Monroe County, Ohio, United States. As of the 2020 census, the population was 419.

== Geography ==
Located in the center of the county, it borders the following townships:

- Adams Township - north
- Salem Township - northeast
- Ohio Township - east
- Lee Township - southeast
- Jackson Township - south
- Perry Township - southwest
- Center Township - northwest

No municipalities are located in Green Township, although the unincorporated community of Laings lies in the center of the township.

== Name and history ==
It is one of sixteen Green Townships statewide.

== Government ==
The township is governed by a three-member board of trustees, who are elected in November of odd-numbered years to a four-year term beginning on the following January 1. Two are elected in the year after the presidential election and one is elected in the year before it. There is also an elected township fiscal officer, who serves a four-year term beginning on April 1 of the year after the election, which is held in November of the year before the presidential election. Vacancies in the fiscal officership or on the board of trustees are filled by the remaining trustees.
