= Sistersville Ferry =

Ferry in Ohio and West Virginia, United States

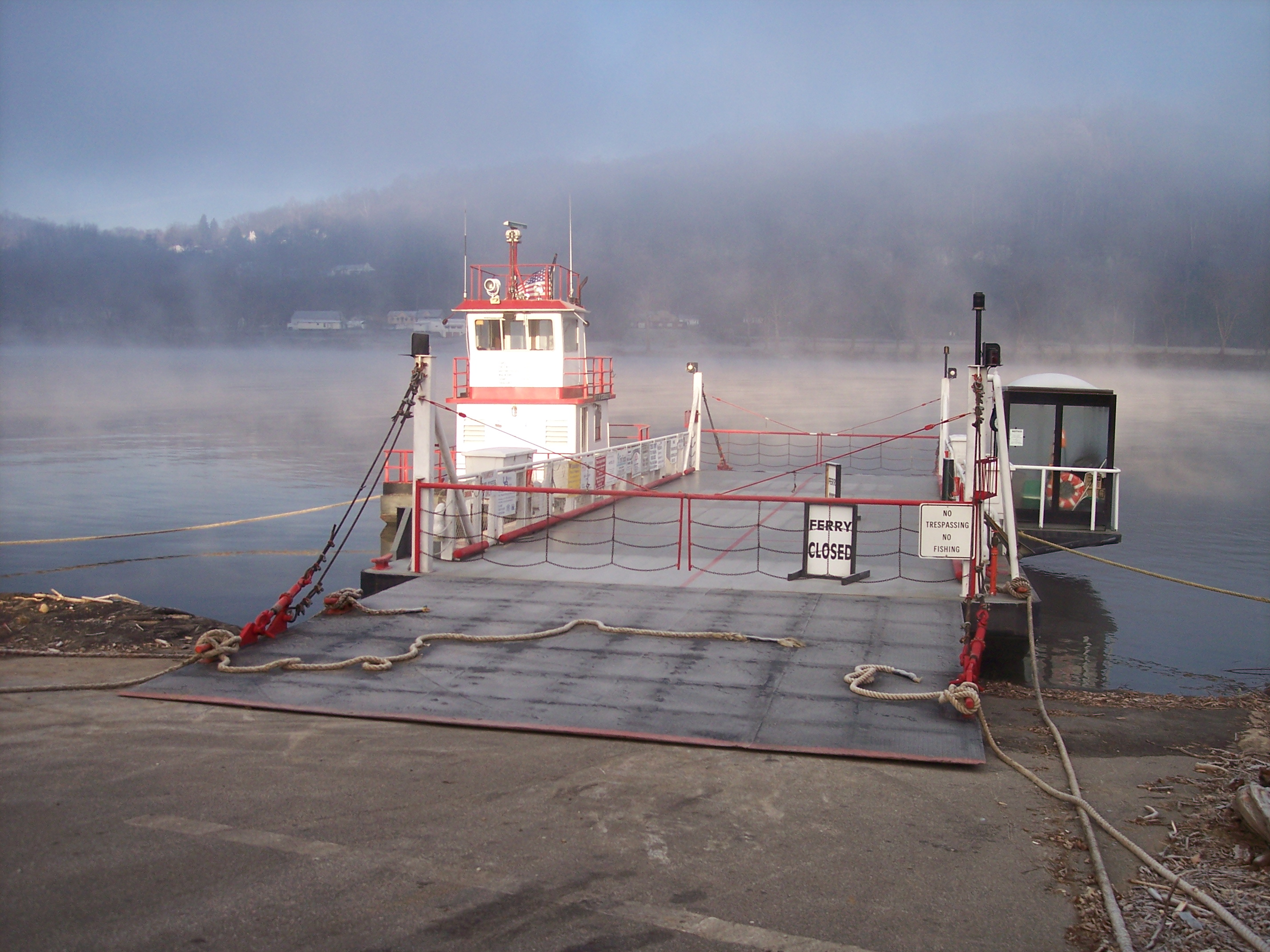
The Sistersville Ferry, out of service on a foggy morning in 2006

The Sistersville Ferry crosses the Ohio River between Sistersville, West Virginia, and the unincorporated community of Fly, Ohio.

Known as the oldest ferry in West Virginia, it has been in continuous operation since 1817. It is one of five ferries left on the Ohio River, and the only one along the 277 mi (446 km) stretch of the river on the West Virginia border; the others, located at Augusta, Anderson, Rising Sun and Cave-in-Rock, are all downstream, on the Kentucky portion of the river.

In 2026, 32-foot (9.8 m) the 14-ton ferry "City of Sistersville II" sprang a leak and sank in shallow water in the Ohio River at Sistersville, West Virginia. After being refloated on 11 April, it had been pushed ashore by river current, having been returned to the river on 9 April from winter storage. Salvage is expected.

Historic ferry boats
Year	Vessel Name
1886	Orion
1889	W.C. Pusey
1917	Dora T
1938	Elinor D
1939	John F III
1956	Kiwanis
1957	Rides
1999	City of Sistersville II (its barge is named G.B.)

== See also ==
- List of crossings of the Ohio River
