= Salem Church (Sardis, Ohio) =

Historic church in Ohio, United States

- U.S. National Register of Historic Places
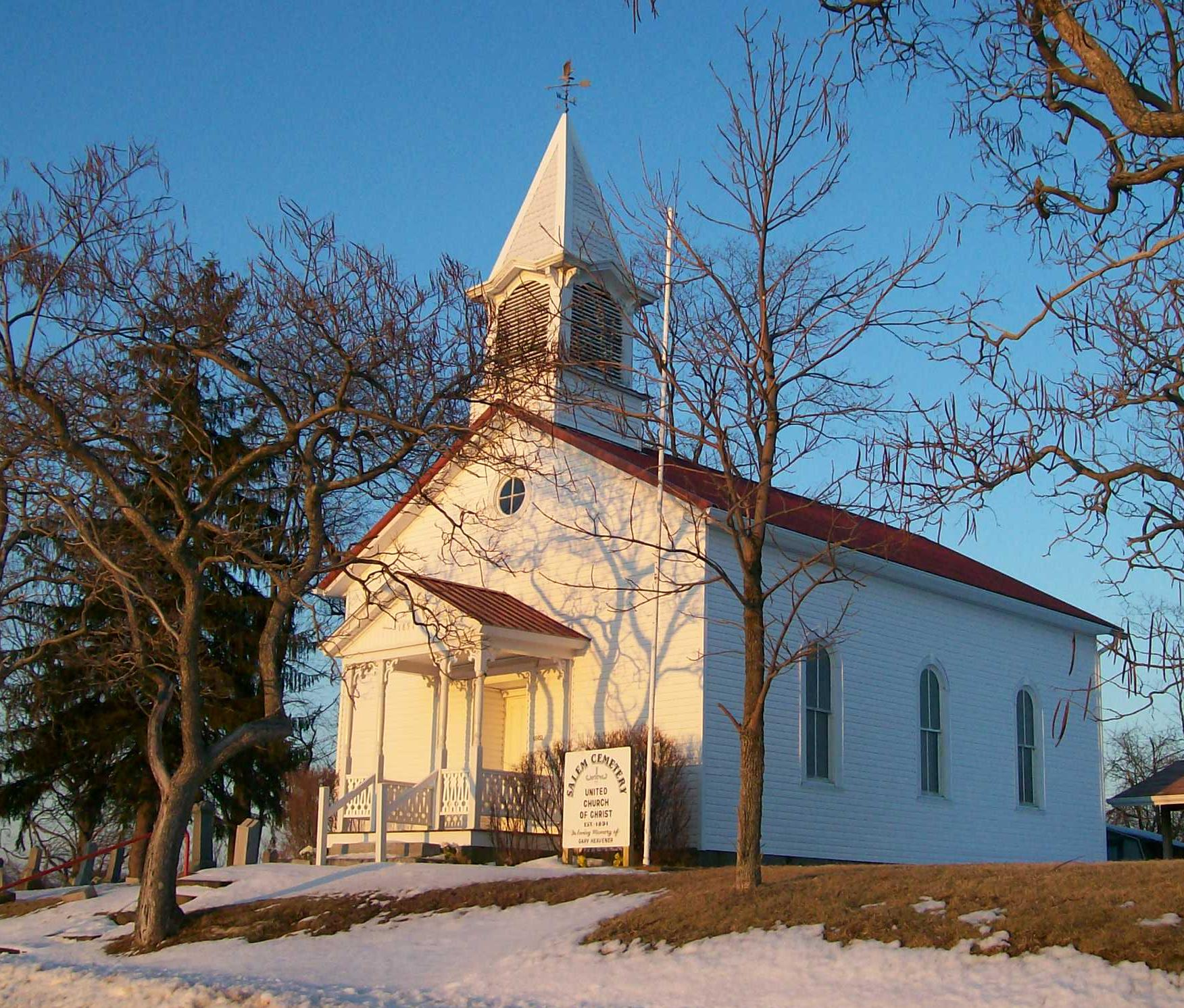

- Location within Ohio Location within the United States
- Nearest city: Sardis, Ohio
- Coordinates: 39°39′57″N 80°57′0″W
- Area: less than one acre
- Built: 1891
- Built by: Bruni Bros.
- Architectural style: Italianate, Nave plan church
- NRHP reference No.: 92000989
- Added to NRHP: August 18, 1992

Salem Church (also known as German Evangelical Salem Church and Salem United Church of Christ) is a historic church in Sardis, Ohio.

It was built in 1891 and added to the National Register of Historic Places in 1992.
