= Sycamore Valley, Ohio =

Unincorporated community in Ohio, U.S.

Coordinates: 39°39′59″N 81°14′36″W

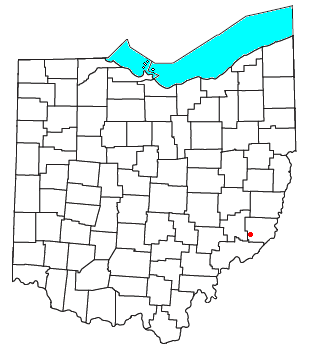
Location of Sycamore Valley, Ohio

Sycamore Valley is an unincorporated community in northern Bethel Township, Monroe County, Ohio, United States. It had a post office with the ZIP code 43789, becoming a discontinued post office on 05/02/2009.
