= Center Township, Monroe County, Ohio =

Township in Ohio, US

- Township
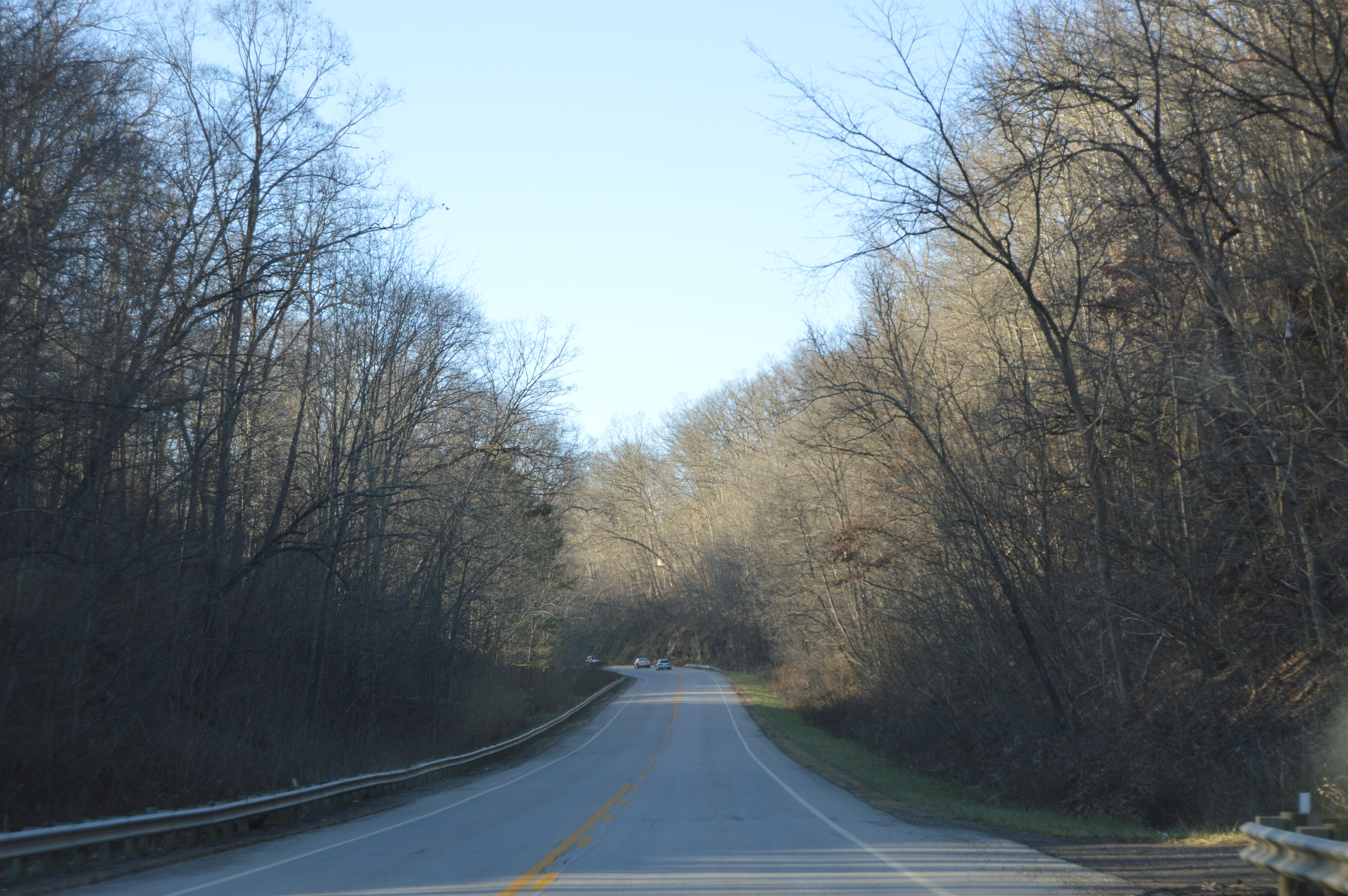
- State Route 78 east of Woodsfield

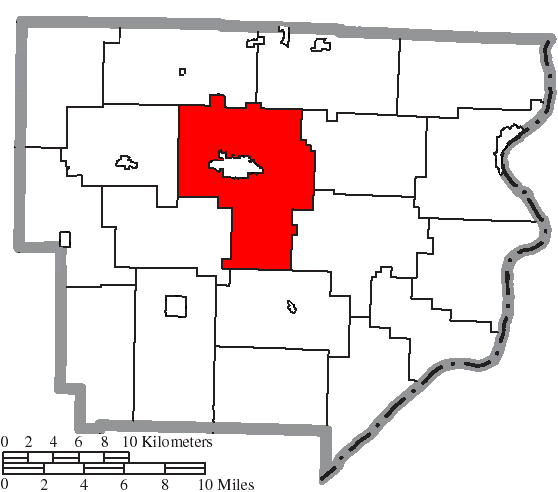
- Location of Center Township in Monroe County
- Coordinates: 39°45′26″N 81°6′26″W
- Country: United States
- State: Ohio
- County: Monroe

Area
  - Total: 41.4 sq mi (107.2 km^{2})
  - Land: 41.4 sq mi (107.1 km^{2})
  - Water: 0.039 sq mi (0.1 km^{2})
- Elevation: 1,178 ft (359 m)

Population (2020)
  - Total: 3,446
  - Density: 83.33/sq mi (32.18/km^{2})
- Time zone: UTC-5 (Eastern (EST))
  - Summer (DST): UTC-4 (EDT)
- FIPS code: 39-12966
- GNIS feature ID: 1086649

Center Township is one of the eighteen townships of Monroe County, Ohio, United States. As of the 2020 census, the population was 3,446.

== Geography ==
Located in the center of the county, it borders the following townships:

- Sunsbury Township – northeast
- Adams Township – east
- Green Township – southeast
- Perry Township – south
- Wayne Township – southwest
- Summit Township – west
- Malaga Township – northwest

The village of Woodsfield, the county seat of Monroe County, is located in northern Center Township.

== Name and history ==
It is one of nine Center Townships statewide.

== Government ==
The township is governed by a three-member board of trustees, who are elected in November of odd-numbered years to a four-year term beginning on the following January 1. Two are elected in the year after the presidential election and one is elected in the year before it. There is also an elected township fiscal officer, who serves a four-year term beginning on April 1 of the year after the election, which is held in November of the year before the presidential election. Vacancies in the fiscal officership or on the board of trustees are filled by the remaining trustees.
