= Fly, Ohio =

- Unincorporated community
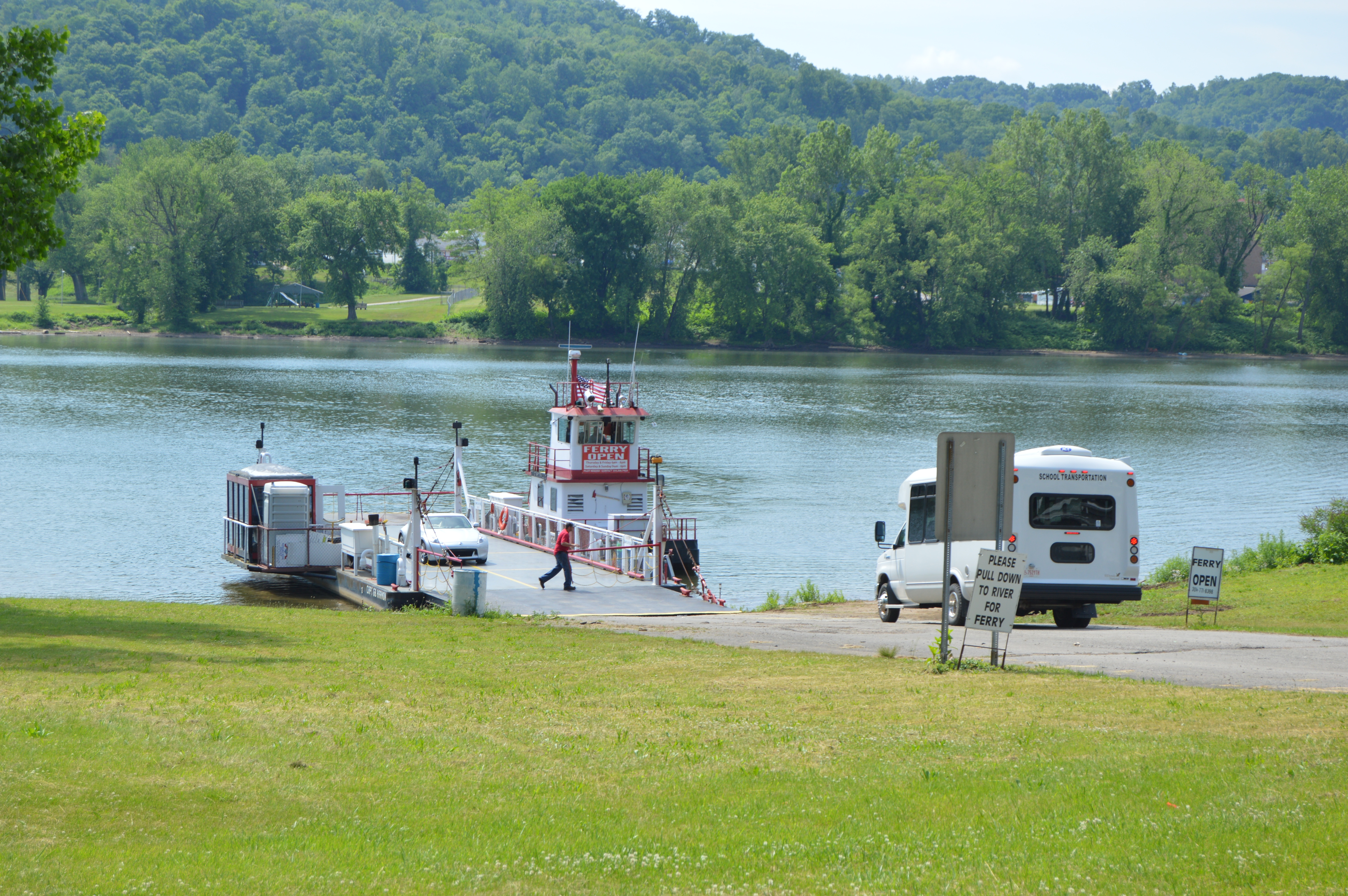
- Sistersville Ferry at Fly

- Location within Ohio Location within the United States
- Country: United States
- State: Ohio
- County: Monroe
- Township: Jackson
- Elevation: 692 ft (211 m)
- Time zone: UTC-5 (Eastern (EST))
  - Summer (DST): UTC-4 (EDT)
- ZIP Codes: 45767 (Fly); 43946 (Sardis)
- Area codes: 740 & 220
- GNIS feature ID: 1075863

Fly is an unincorporated community in Jackson Township, Monroe County, in the U.S. state of Ohio. The community is at the intersection of routes 7 and 800 adjacent to the Ohio River. The city of Sistersville, West Virginia, lies across the river to the southeast and is accessed via ferry across the river.

== History ==
A post office called Fly was established in 1886 and remained in operation until 1995. The last Postmaster was Bertha Wright. It is said that the townspeople selected the name Fly on account of its brevity.

For more than 200 years, a ferry service has connected Fly, Ohio with the cross-river community of Sistersville, West Virginia. It is the only ferry still operating on the Ohio-West Virginia border. The ferry began in 1817 at what everyone calls "Long Reach." Fly was an unpopulated site in Ohio and Sistersville was known as Wells Landing, then a part of the Commonwealth of Virginia.

Fly is best known for having been used as a campsite by George Washington during a 1770 survey of the Ohio Valley. The Ohio Bicentennial Commission placed a historical marker there to commemorate the event.

George Washington camped in Fly, Ohio, on the night of October 26, 1770, during his exploration trip along the Ohio River. This encampment was significant as it marked the beginning of his journey to find suitable lands for settlement in the Ohio Country. Washington's trip was part of his efforts to acquire land for veterans of the Indian Wars, and he documented his observations and experiences during this expedition.
