= Barkcamp State Park =

State park in Belmont County, Ohio, USA

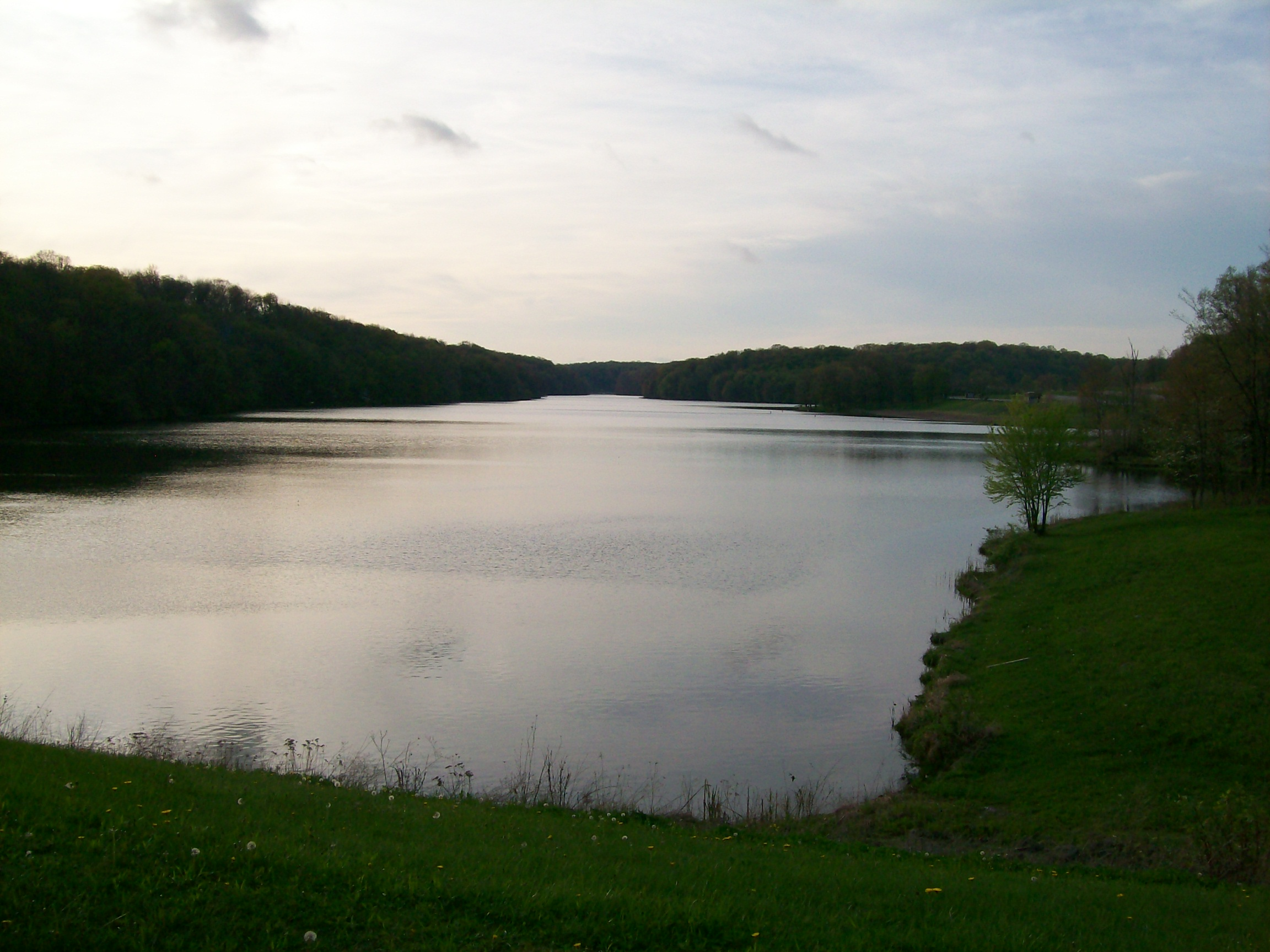
- Belmont Lake

- Location within Ohio Location within the United States
- Location: Belmont County, Ohio, United States
- Coordinates: 40°02′29″N 81°00′57″W
- Area: Land: 1,005 acres (407 ha); Water: 117 acres (47 ha)
- Elevation: 1,083 ft (330 m)
- Established: 1955
- Administrator: Ohio Department of Natural Resources
- Designation: Ohio state park
- Website: Barkcamp State Park

Barkcamp State Park is a public recreation area located in Belmont County, Ohio, United States, near the village of Belmont. The 1,005-acre (407 ha) state park centers around 117-acre (47 ha) Belmont Lake. The park offers camping including equestrian facilities, hiking and horseback trails, basketball courts, boat ramps, beach, and other recreational sites.

== History ==
The Barkcamp Creek, the namesake for the park, once ran through the area until the dam was completed in 1963, thus reducing the outflow of water. The area once housed a logging camp where logs were stripped of bark in preparation for delivery to the mill. The Ohio Department of Natural Resources began land acquisition for the park in 1955 and developed the property into a fishing and game reserve. The park ranger once lived on the site.
