= Ohio Township, Monroe County, Ohio =

Township in Ohio, US

- Township
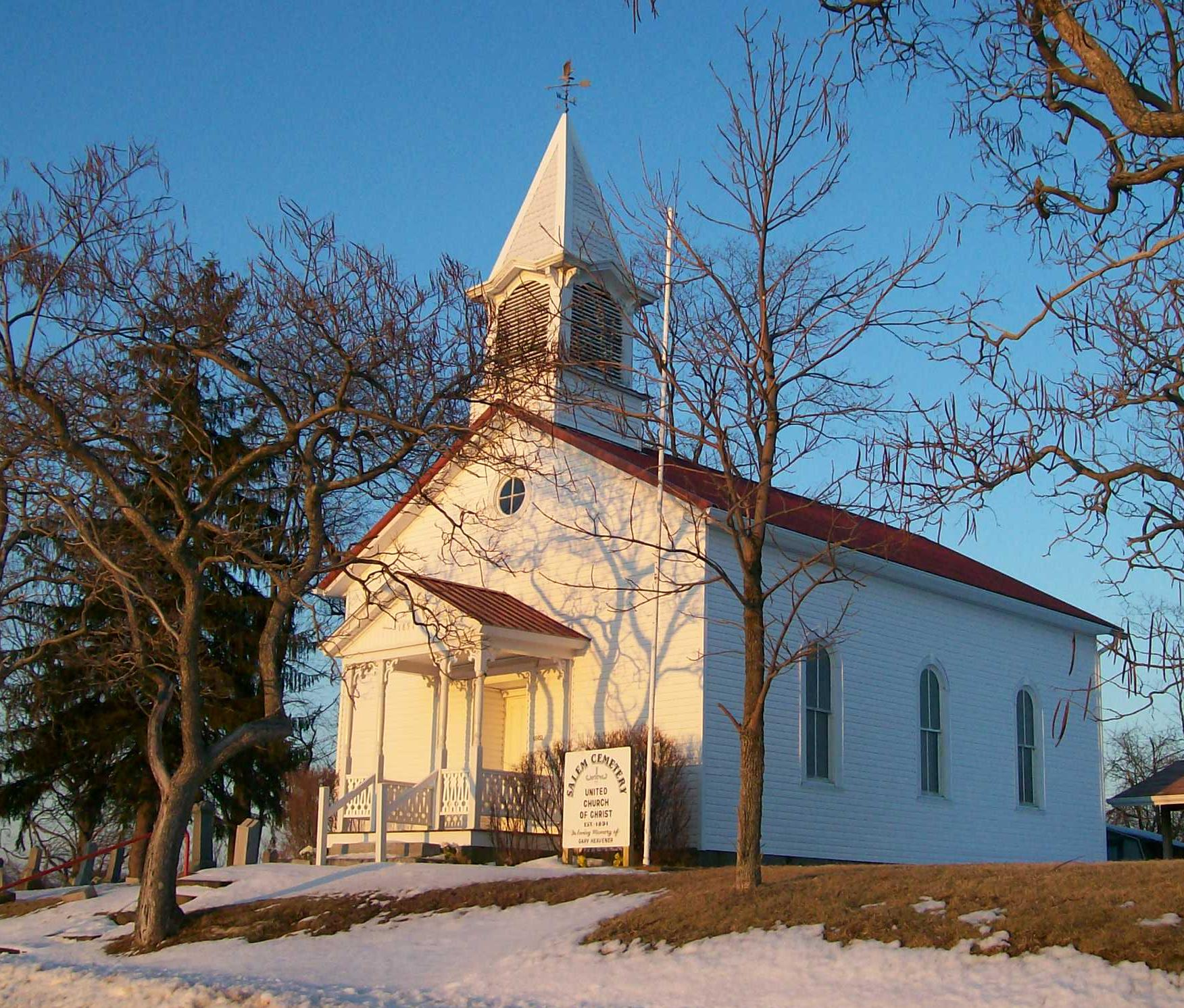
- Salem Church, a historic site on State Route 255

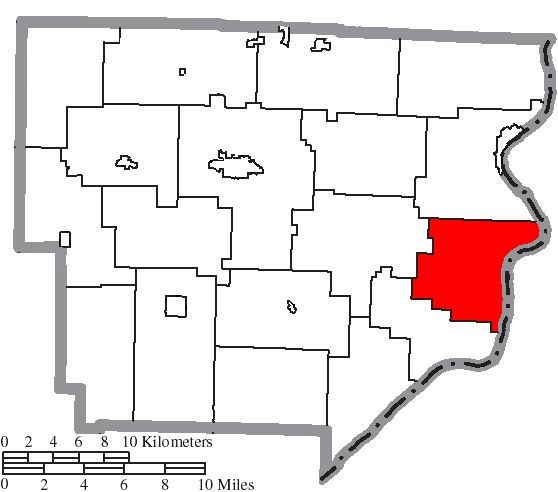
- Location of Ohio Township in Monroe County
- Coordinates: 39°41′4″N 80°53′6″W
- Country: United States
- State: Ohio
- County: Monroe

Area
  - Total: 23.4 sq mi (60.6 km^{2})
  - Land: 23.1 sq mi (59.7 km^{2})
  - Water: 0.35 sq mi (0.9 km^{2})
- Elevation: 1,076 ft (328 m)

Population (2020)
  - Total: 837
  - Density: 36.3/sq mi (14.0/km^{2})
- Time zone: UTC-5 (Eastern (EST))
  - Summer (DST): UTC-4 (EDT)
- Area code: 740
- FIPS code: 39-57988
- GNIS feature ID: 1086655

Ohio Township is one of the eighteen townships of Monroe County, Ohio, United States. As of the 2020 census, the population was 837.

== Geography ==
Located in the eastern part of the county along the Ohio River, it borders the following townships:

- Salem Township - north
- Lee Township - southwest
- Green Township - northwest

West Virginia lies across the Ohio River to the east: Marshall County farther north, and Wetzel County farther south.

No municipalities are located in Ohio Township, although the census-designated place of Hannibal lies in the township's east along the Ohio River.

== Name and history ==
Statewide, other Ohio Townships are located in Clermont and Gallia counties.

== Government ==
The township is governed by a three-member board of trustees, who are elected in November of odd-numbered years to a four-year term beginning on the following January 1. Two are elected in the year after the presidential election and one is elected in the year before it. There is also an elected township fiscal officer, who serves a four-year term beginning on April 1 of the year after the election, which is held in November of the year before the presidential election. Vacancies in the fiscal officership or on the board of trustees are filled by the remaining trustees.
