= Monroe County Courthouse (Ohio) =

Local government building in the United States

- U.S. National Register of Historic Places
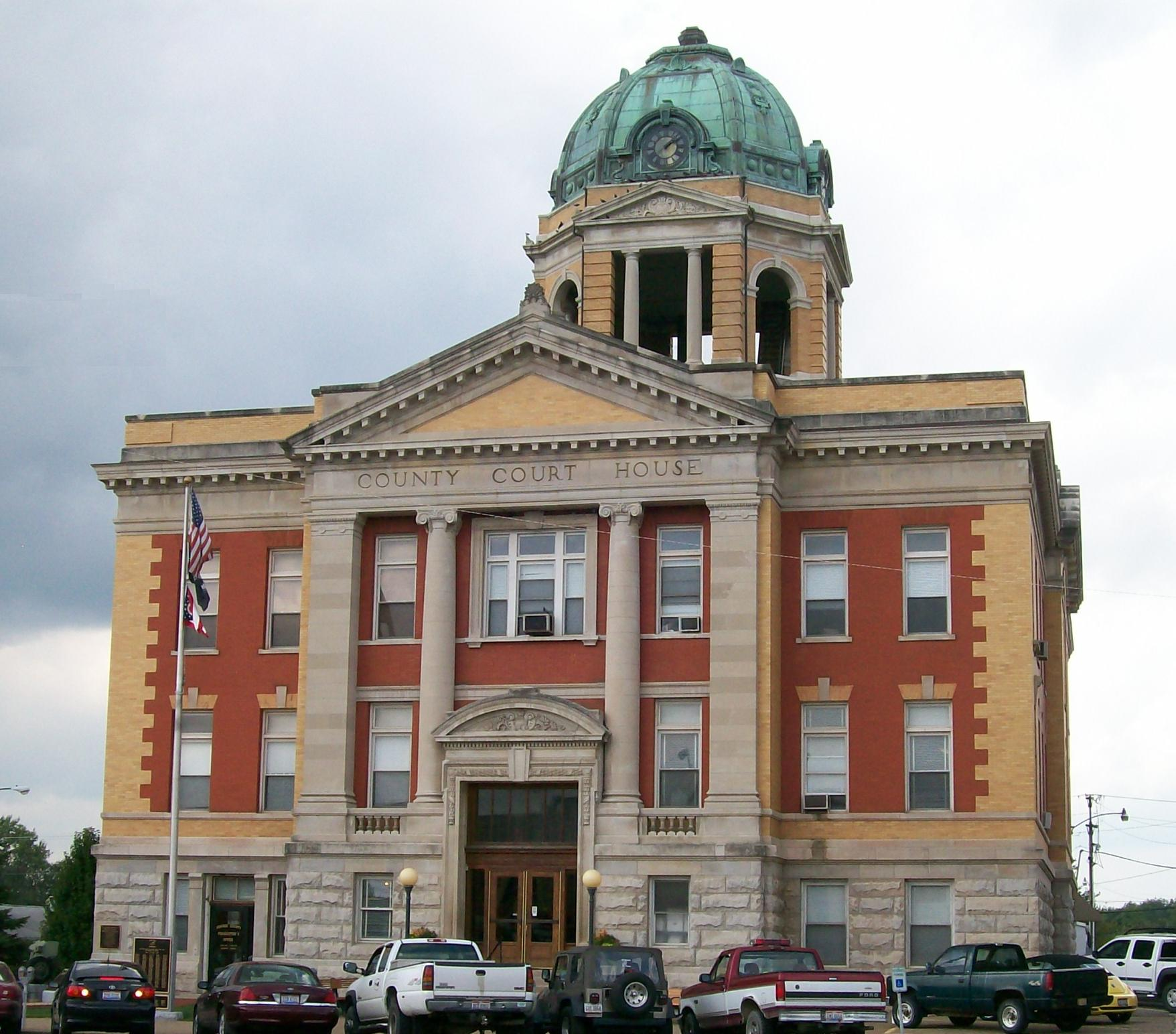
- Monroe County Courthouse

- Location within Ohio Location within the United States
- Interactive map showing the location of Monroe County Courthouse
- Location: Main St. in Woodsfield, Ohio
- Coordinates: 39°45′46″N 81°6′59″W
- Built: 1905; 121 years ago
- Architect: Samuel Hannaford & Sons
- Architectural style: Classical Revival
- NRHP reference No.: 80003168
- Added to NRHP: July 21, 1980

The Monroe County Courthouse is located in Woodsfield, Ohio and is one of few courthouses located in a town square. It is the fourth courthouse building on this site, with two of the previous ones destroyed in fires. The present building is of red brick with yellow brick quoins, pillars and pediments, which are said to represent the colors of fall in the surrounding countryside. The main entrance is reached by a small flight of stairs between Ionic columns and a pediment of fine arched stone.

The courthouse has one of ten largest clocks in the world, which can be seen from miles away. Its four faces were installed in 1908 by Howard Clock Company of New York. The cost of the clock was $2,775.

The dome of the courthouse was once a bright copper plating, but was removed due to public dissatisfaction.

The present courthouse is still used for judicial purposes, housing both criminal and civil proceedings as well as probate and juvenile matters.
