= Lee Township, Monroe County, Ohio =

Township in Ohio, US

- Township
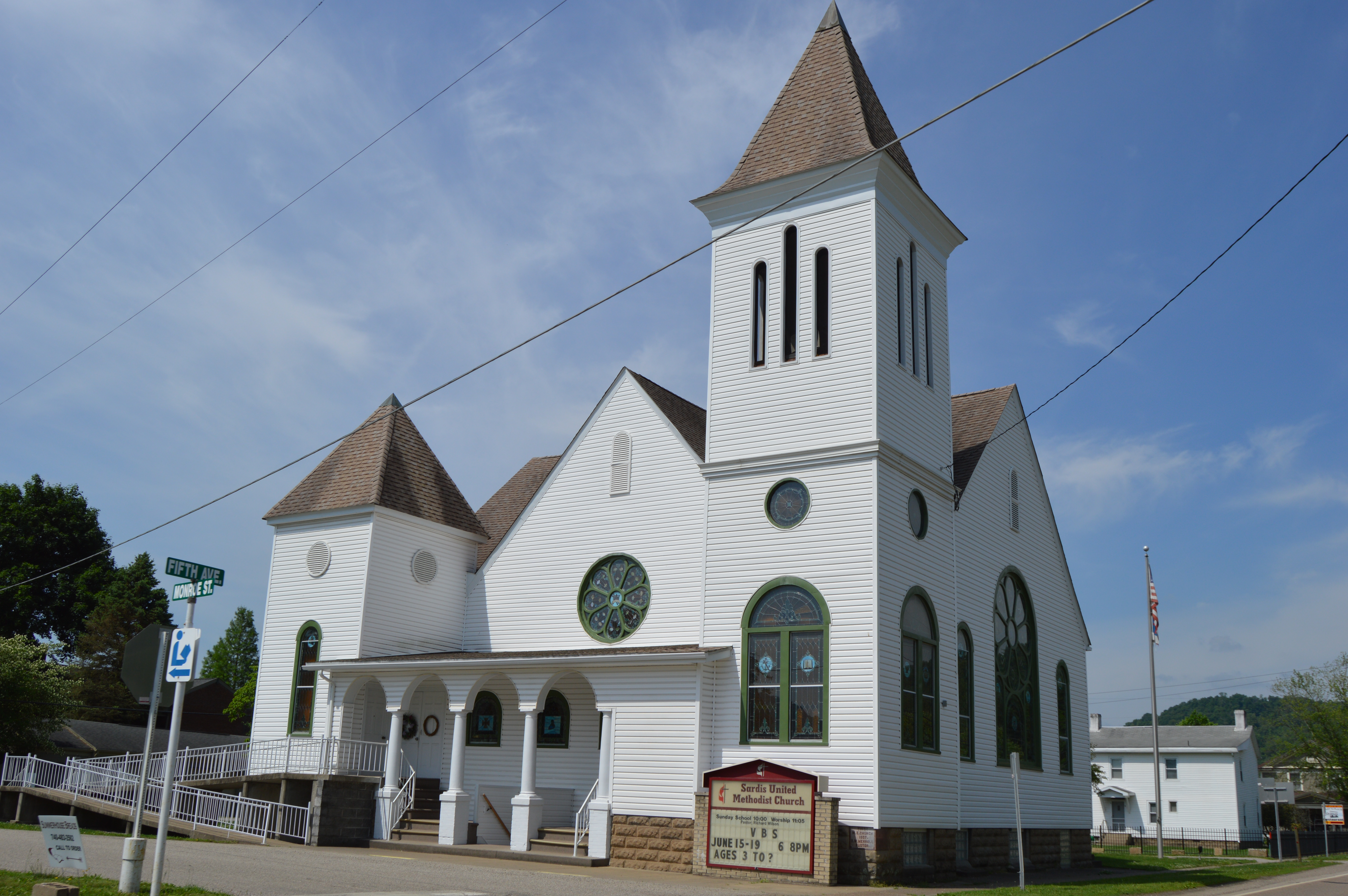
- Methodist church at Sardis

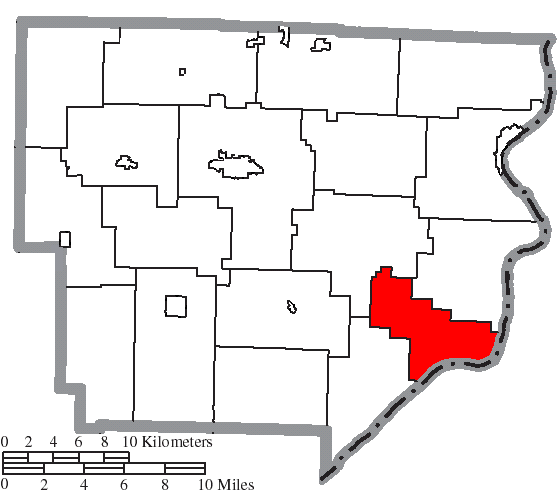
- Location of Lee Township in Monroe County
- Coordinates: 39°38′9″N 80°55′45″W
- Country: United States
- State: Ohio
- County: Monroe

Area
  - Total: 17.7 sq mi (45.8 km^{2})
  - Land: 17.5 sq mi (45.2 km^{2})
  - Water: 0.23 sq mi (0.6 km^{2})
- Elevation: 945 ft (288 m)

Population (2020)
  - Total: 883
  - Density: 50.6/sq mi (19.5/km^{2})
- Time zone: UTC-5 (Eastern (EST))
  - Summer (DST): UTC-4 (EDT)
- FIPS code: 39-42448
- GNIS feature ID: 1086653
- Website: https://leetownshipohio.org/

Lee Township is one of the eighteen townships of Monroe County, Ohio, United States. As of the 2020 census, the population was 883.

== Geography ==
Located in the eastern part of the county along the Ohio River, it borders the following townships:

- Ohio Township - northeast
- Jackson Township - southwest
- Green Township - northwest

Wetzel County, West Virginia lies across the Ohio River to the southeast.

No municipalities are located in Lee Township, although the census-designated place of Sardis lies in the township's southeast along the Ohio River.

== Name and history ==
Statewide, other Lee Townships are located in Athens and Carroll counties.

== Government ==
The township is governed by a three-member board of trustees, who are elected in November of odd-numbered years to a four-year term beginning on the following January 1. Two are elected in the year after the presidential election and one is elected in the year before it. There is also an elected township fiscal officer, who serves a four-year term beginning on April 1 of the year after the election, which is held in November of the year before the presidential election. Vacancies in the fiscal officership or on the board of trustees are filled by the remaining trustees.

== History ==
Lee Township was formed in 1869 from parts of Ohio, Green and Jackson Townships. It was authorized by an act of the General Assembly on February 10, 1869, making it the only township in Monroe County to have been organized by action taken by the Ohio Legislature.

Some of the early settlers in the area began arriving about 1800. Among those were Philander B. Stewart, Dr. Miles, Stephen Scott, Charles Wells, James Patton, John Patton, and David Patton. Other families were the Nesbitts, Steels, and Johnsons. Major Earl Sproat settled on 690 acres of land, which adjoined the land of a Mr. McBride. Sproat was one of the 48 men known as the Ohio Company who made the first permanent settlement in the Northwest Territory at present-day Marietta, Washington County, Ohio, in 1788. Following Sproat's death about 1823, his land was sold to James Patton in 1825.

In 1843, Patton laid out the village of Sardis. The original plat included sixty-four lots. Wilson Martin built the first house in the village. The first post office was established in 1844 and its first postmaster was Thomas Algeo. With its access to the river, Sardis became an active port for farmers to sell their crops and products. The village also was home to several factories: cigar, button, furniture to name a few. It also had a flouring mill, planing mill, and cider mill. Hotels, blacksmith shop, and other businesses flourished in the town. With the improvement of roads and transportation, the businesses that were fed by the river transportation disappeared, as did other businesses with the advent of modern conveniences.
