= Monroe County, Ohio =

County in Ohio, United States

- County
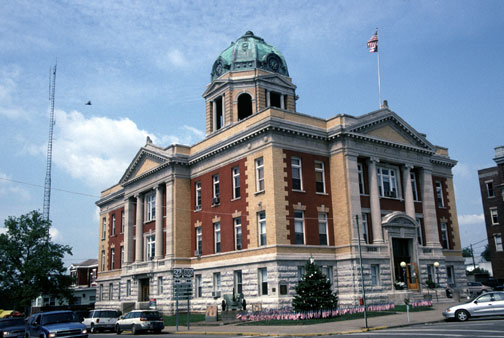
- Monroe County Courthouse

- Flag Seal

- Location within the U.S. state of Ohio
- Coordinates: 39°44′N 81°05′W
- Country: United States
- State: Ohio
- Founded: March 1, 1815
- Named for: James Monroe
- Seat: Woodsfield
- Largest village: Woodsfield

Area
  - Total: 457 sq mi (1,180 km^{2})
  - Land: 456 sq mi (1,180 km^{2})
  - Water: 1.7 sq mi (4.4 km^{2}) 0.4%

Population (2020)
  - Total: 13,385
  - Estimate (2025): 12,994 ▼
  - Density: 28.5/sq mi (11.0/km^{2})
- Time zone: UTC−5 (Eastern)
  - Summer (DST): UTC−4 (EDT)
- Congressional district: 6th
- Website: www.monroecountyohio.net

Monroe County is a county located on the eastern border of the U.S. state of Ohio, across the Ohio River from West Virginia. As of the 2020 census, the population was 13,385, making it the second-least populous county in Ohio. Its county seat is Woodsfield. The county was created in 1813 and later organized in 1815.

== History ==
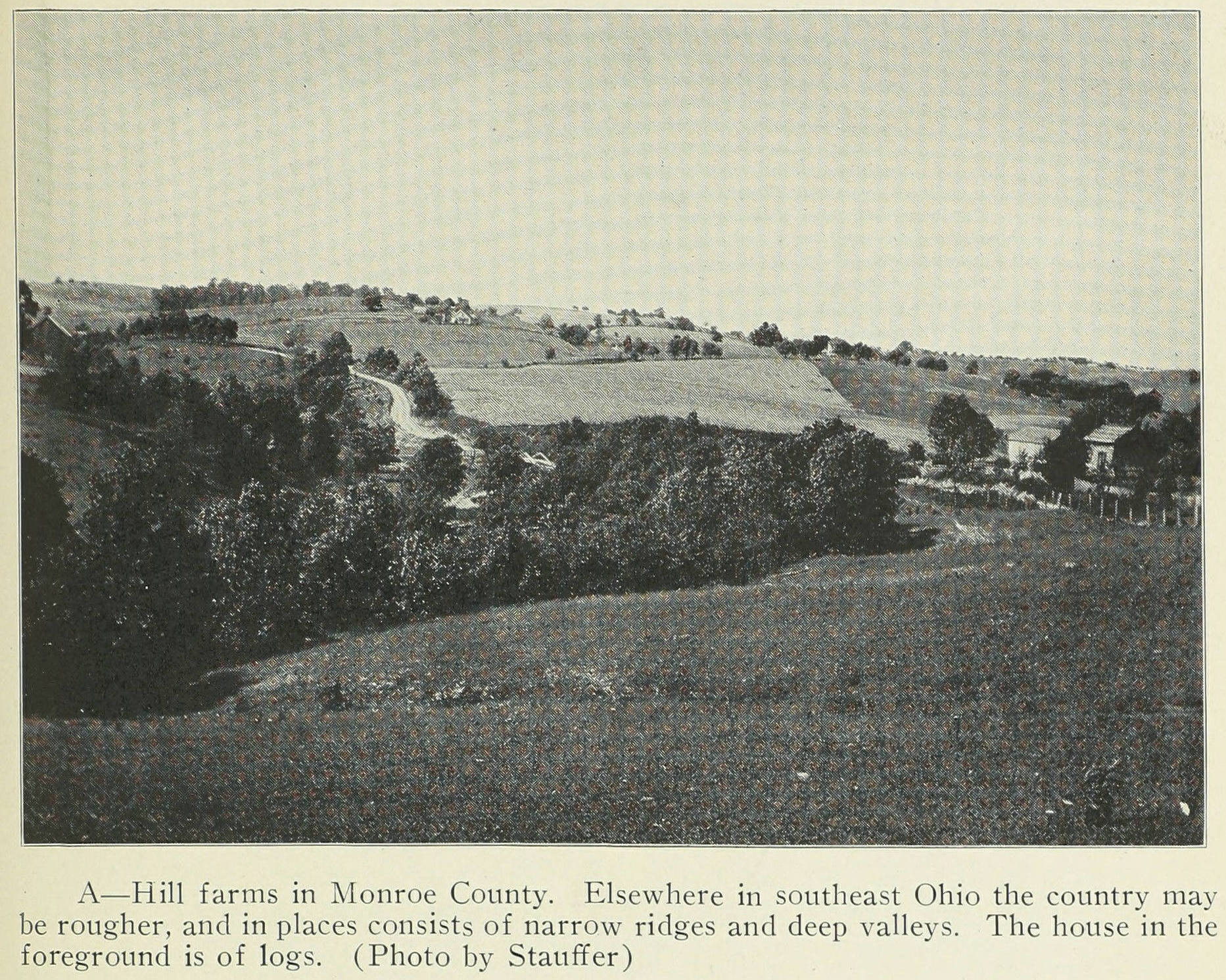
Hill farms in Monroe County, 1923

Monroe County was formed on January 28, 1813, from portions of Belmont, Guernsey and Washington counties. It was named after James Monroe, the U.S. Secretary of State when the county was formed, and later fifth President of the United States. When organized, the county's eastern border was with the state of Virginia. This portion of the state seceded from Virginia during the American Civil War, being admitted to the Union as the state of West Virginia. The largely rural county reached its peak of population in the 19th century, before urbanization drew people into and near cities for work and other opportunities. It is still a center of Amish population and farms.

In 1891, West Virginia's Sistersville Field was discovered to extend into Monroe County. By 1901, 300 wells near Woodsfield, Ohio, were producing 55,000 barrels of oil a month.

On or about December 20, 2011, ExxonMobil, a New Jersey petroleum company, via its subsidiary XTO Energy, acquired 20,056 acres of Monroe County Utica Shale gas leases from Beck Energy.

== Geography ==
According to the United States Census Bureau, the county has a total area of 457 square miles (1,180 km^{2}), of which 456 square miles (1,180 km^{2}) is land and 1.7 square miles (4.4 km^{2}) (0.4%) is water. It is bordered by the Ohio River to the east. The terrain is hilly in this area, with waterways cutting through some hills of the Appalachian Plateau, which extends from Lake Erie to the Ohio River, which flows southwest to the south of this county.

=== Adjacent counties ===
- Belmont County (north)
- Marshall County, West Virginia (northeast)
- Wetzel County, West Virginia (east)
- Tyler County, West Virginia (southeast)
- Washington County (south)
- Noble County (west)

=== National protected area ===
- Wayne National Forest (part)

== Demographics ==
Historical population
Census	Pop.	Note	%±
1820	4,645		—
1830	8,768		88.8%
1840	18,521		111.2%
1850	28,351		53.1%
1860	25,741		−9.2%
1870	25,779		0.1%
1880	26,496		2.8%
1890	25,175		−5.0%
1900	27,031		7.4%
1910	24,244		−10.3%
1920	20,660		−14.8%
1930	18,426		−10.8%
1940	18,641		1.2%
1950	15,362		−17.6%
1960	15,268		−0.6%
1970	15,739		3.1%
1980	17,382		10.4%
1990	15,497		−10.8%
2000	15,180		−2.0%
2010	14,642		−3.5%
2020	13,385		−8.6%
2025 (est.)	12,994	▼	−2.9%
U.S. Decennial Census; 1790–1960 1900–1990; 1990–2000 2010–2020 2025

=== 2020 census ===
As of the 2020 census, the county had a population of 13,385. The median age was 47.4 years. 20.1% of residents were under the age of 18 and 24.7% of residents were 65 years of age or older. For every 100 females there were 102.3 males, and for every 100 females age 18 and over there were 100.5 males.

The racial makeup of the county was 96.7% White, 0.1% Black or African American, 0.1% American Indian and Alaska Native, 0.2% Asian, <0.1% Native Hawaiian and Pacific Islander, 0.2% from some other race, and 2.7% from two or more races. Hispanic or Latino residents of any race comprised 0.5% of the population.

1.3% of residents lived in urban areas, while 98.7% lived in rural areas.

There were 5,747 households in the county, of which 24.7% had children under the age of 18 living in them. Of all households, 50.8% were married-couple households, 20.4% were households with a male householder and no spouse or partner present, and 22.7% were households with a female householder and no spouse or partner present. About 30.3% of all households were made up of individuals and 15.7% had someone living alone who was 65 years of age or older.

There were 7,133 housing units, of which 19.4% were vacant. Among occupied housing units, 77.5% were owner-occupied and 22.5% were renter-occupied. The homeowner vacancy rate was 1.8% and the rental vacancy rate was 13.5%.

=== Racial and ethnic composition ===
Monroe County, Ohio – Racial and ethnic composition Note: the US Census treats Hispanic/Latino as an ethnic category. This table excludes Latinos from the racial categories and assigns them to a separate category. Hispanics/Latinos may be of any race.
Race / ethnicity (NH = Non-Hispanic)	Pop 1980	Pop 1990	Pop 2000	Pop 2010	Pop 2020	% 1980	% 1990	% 2000	% 2010	% 2020
White alone (NH)	17,317	15,415	14,944	14,326	12,909	99.63%	99.47%	98.45%	97.84%	96.44%
Black or African American alone (NH)	6	19	38	60	19	0.03%	0.12%	0.25%	0.41%	0.14%
Native American or Alaska Native alone (NH)	7	26	21	16	12	0.04%	0.17%	0.14%	0.11%	0.09%
Asian alone (NH)	7	12	10	16	21	0.04%	0.08%	0.07%	0.11%	0.16%
Native Hawaiian or Pacific Islander alone (NH)	x	x	2	1	3	x	x	0.01%	0.01%	0.02%
Other race alone (NH)	3	1	5	1	19	0.02%	0.01%	0.03%	0.01%	0.14%
Mixed race or Multiracial (NH)	x	x	98	163	335	x	x	0.65%	1.11%	2.50%
Hispanic or Latino (any race)	42	24	62	59	67	0.24%	0.15%	0.41%	0.40%	0.50%
Total	17,382	15,497	15,180	14,642	13,385	100.00%	100.00%	100.00%	100.00%	100.00%

=== 2010 census ===
As of the 2010 United States census, there were 14,642 people, 6,065 households, and 4,183 families living in the county. The population density was 32.1 inhabitants per square mile (12.4/km^{2}). There were 7,567 housing units at an average density of 16.6 units per square mile (6.4 units/km^{2}). The racial makeup of the county was 98.1% white, 0.4% black or African American, 0.1% Asian, 0.1% American Indian, 0.1% from other races, and 1.2% from two or more races. Those of Hispanic or Latino origin made up 0.4% of the population. In terms of ancestry, 34.8% were German, 14.5% were Irish, 10.6% were English, and 9.6% were American.

Of the 6,065 households, 27.3% had children under the age of 18 living with them, 56.0% were married couples living together, 8.6% had a female householder with no husband present, 31.0% were non-families, and 27.3% of all households were made up of individuals. The average household size was 2.39 and the average family size was 2.87. The median age was 44.7 years.

The median income for a household in the county was $37,030 and the median income for a family was $43,261. Males had a median income of $39,261 versus $24,922 for females. The per capita income for the county was $18,738. About 12.3% of families and 17.3% of the population were below the poverty line, including 26.7% of those under age 18 and 12.3% of those age 65 or over.

=== 2000 census ===
As of the census of 2000, there were 15,180 people, 6,021 households, and 4,413 families living in the county. The population density was 33 people per square mile (13 people/km^{2}). There were 7,212 housing units at an average density of 16 units per square mile (6.2/km^{2}). The racial makeup of the county was 98.72% White, 0.26% Black or African American, 0.15% Native American, 0.07% Asian, 0.01% Pacific Islander, 0.11% from other races, and 0.67% from two or more races. 0.41% of the population were Hispanic or Latino of any race.

There were 6,021 households, out of which 29.50% had children under the age of 18 living with them, 61.70% were married couples living together, 8.10% had a female householder with no husband present, and 26.70% were non-families. 24.00% of all households were made up of individuals, and 11.50% had someone living alone who was 65 years of age or older. The average household size was 2.50 and the average family size was 2.96.

In the county, the population was spread out, with 23.60% under the age of 18, 7.10% from 18 to 24, 25.90% from 25 to 44, 27.20% from 45 to 64, and 16.30% who were 65 years of age or older. The median age was 41 years. For every 100 females there were 97.50 males. For every 100 females age 18 and over, there were 96.10 males.

The median income for a household in the county was $30,467, and the median income for a family was $36,297. Males had a median income of $33,308 versus $19,628 for females. The per capita income for the county was $15,096. About 11.00% of families and 13.90% of the population were below the poverty line, including 18.30% of those under age 18 and 11.40% of those age 65 or over.

== Politics ==
1984 Mondale: 50–60% 60–70% Reagan: 50–60%

1988 Dukakis: 50–60% 60–70% 70–80% Bush: 50–60%

2000 Gore: 40–50% 50–60% 60–70% Bush: 40–50% 50–60%

2004 Kerry: 50–60% 60–70% Bush: 50–60% 60–70% Tie:

2008 Obama: 40–50% 50–60% 60–70% McCain: 40–50% 50–60%

2012 Romney: 40–50% 50–60% 60–70% Obama: 50–60%

2016 Trump: 60–70% 70–80% 80–90%

2020 Trump: 60–70% 70–80% 80–90%

As was typical for Appalachian counties, Monroe County voted Democratic in most elections – all but 7 times from 1856 until 2008. In 2012, it voted Republican for the first time since 1972. In 2016, it took a sharp turn to the right, voting for Donald Trump by a large margin. In the 2014 gubernatorial election, Monroe was one of two counties to vote for Democrat Ed FitzGerald over Republican John Kasich (along with Athens County). However, in 2018 it voted for Republican Mike DeWine over Democrat Richard Cordray.

United States presidential election results for Monroe County, Ohio
Year	Republican		Democratic		Third party(ies)	
Year	No.	%	No.	%	No.	%
1856	1,016	23.96%	2,812	66.31%	413	9.74%
1860	1,335	28.57%	3,147	67.36%	190	4.07%
1864	1,440	31.03%	3,201	68.97%	0	0.00%
1868	1,443	29.81%	3,397	70.19%	0	0.00%
1872	1,307	30.74%	2,878	67.69%	67	1.58%
1876	1,462	27.71%	3,805	72.11%	10	0.19%
1880	1,600	29.30%	3,751	68.70%	109	2.00%
1884	1,645	28.99%	4,010	70.66%	20	0.35%
1888	1,621	29.04%	3,886	69.63%	74	1.33%
1892	1,630	29.08%	3,838	68.47%	137	2.44%
1896	2,001	32.07%	4,180	67.00%	58	0.93%
1900	2,103	33.33%	4,143	65.66%	64	1.01%
1904	2,222	40.17%	3,169	57.30%	140	2.53%
1908	1,974	32.74%	3,961	65.69%	95	1.58%
1912	1,055	21.79%	3,199	66.08%	587	12.13%
1916	1,504	30.61%	3,322	67.62%	87	1.77%
1920	2,825	41.94%	3,861	57.32%	50	0.74%
1924	2,674	40.58%	3,742	56.79%	173	2.63%
1928	4,287	60.73%	2,729	38.66%	43	0.61%
1932	2,767	33.97%	5,263	64.61%	116	1.42%
1936	3,211	36.87%	5,368	61.64%	130	1.49%
1940	4,534	52.28%	4,138	47.72%	0	0.00%
1944	3,617	50.30%	3,574	49.70%	0	0.00%
1948	2,574	39.88%	3,873	60.01%	7	0.11%
1952	3,493	52.09%	3,213	47.91%	0	0.00%
1956	3,738	59.18%	2,578	40.82%	0	0.00%
1960	4,106	56.63%	3,144	43.37%	0	0.00%
1964	1,944	28.93%	4,776	71.07%	0	0.00%
1968	2,686	42.27%	3,105	48.87%	563	8.86%
1972	3,721	59.14%	2,483	39.46%	88	1.40%
1976	2,728	38.25%	4,296	60.24%	108	1.51%
1980	2,870	45.03%	3,166	49.68%	337	5.29%
1984	3,302	47.32%	3,611	51.75%	65	0.93%
1988	2,557	37.20%	4,269	62.10%	48	0.70%
1992	1,823	24.02%	4,235	55.79%	1,533	20.19%
1996	1,856	26.64%	3,914	56.18%	1,197	17.18%
2000	3,145	44.20%	3,605	50.67%	365	5.13%
2004	3,424	44.30%	4,243	54.90%	62	0.80%
2008	3,066	43.91%	3,705	53.07%	211	3.02%
2012	3,548	52.31%	3,035	44.75%	199	2.93%
2016	4,868	71.03%	1,662	24.25%	323	4.71%
2020	5,463	76.31%	1,605	22.42%	91	1.27%
2024	5,396	79.18%	1,336	19.60%	83	1.22%

United States Senate election results for Monroe County, Ohio1
Year	Republican		Democratic		Third party(ies)	
Year	No.	%	No.	%	No.	%
2024	4,715	70.89%	1,725	25.94%	211	3.17%

== Government ==
Monroe County has three County Commissioners who oversee the various County departments, similar to 85 of the other 88 Ohio counties. Current Commissioners are: Mick Schumacher (R), Bill Bolon (R), and Diane Burkhart (R).

Monroe County is served by the Monroe County District Library from its administrative offices in Woodsfield, Ohio; it also offers a bookmobile service.

In 2005, the library loaned more than 141,000 items to its 6,000 cardholders. Total holding are over 64,000 volumes with over 140 periodical subscriptions. This library is a member of the SOLO Regional Library System.

== Education ==
Monroe County contains the following schools through the Switzerland of Ohio Local School District:

- Elementary Schools
  - Beallsville Elementary School in Beallsville, Ohio
  - River Elementary School in Hannibal, Ohio
  - Skyvue Elementary School in Graysville, Ohio
  - Woodsfield Elementary School in Woodsfield, Ohio
  - St. Sylvester Central in Woodsfield, Ohio
- High Schools
  - Monroe Central High School in Woodsfield, Ohio
  - River High School in Hannibal, Ohio
  - Beallsville High School in Beallsville, Ohio (closed in 2025)
- Career Center
  - Swiss Hills Career Center in Woodsfield, Ohio

== Transportation ==
=== Airports ===
The Monroe County Airport is located one nautical mile (1.2 mi; 1.9 km) north of Woodsfield's central business district.

=== Major highways ===
- SR 7
- SR 26
- SR 78
- SR 145
- SR 255
- SR 260
- SR 379
- SR 536
- SR 537
- SR 556
- SR 565
- SR 800

== Communities ==
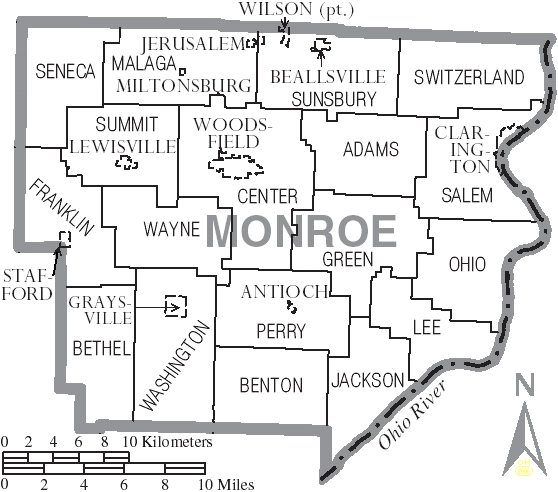
Map of Monroe County, Ohio with municipal and township labels

=== Villages ===
- Antioch
- Beallsville
- Clarington
- Graysville
- Jerusalem
- Lewisville
- Miltonsburg
- Stafford
- Wilson
- Woodsfield (county seat)

=== Townships ===
- Adams
- Benton
- Bethel
- Center
- Franklin
- Green
- Jackson
- Lee
- Malaga
- Ohio
- Perry
- Salem
- Seneca
- Summit
- Sunsbury
- Switzerland
- Washington
- Wayne

=== Census-designated places ===
- Hannibal
- Sardis

=== Unincorporated communities ===
- Cameron
- Duffy
- Fly
- Laings
- Malaga
- Rinard Mills
- Sardis
- Sycamore Valley

=== Ghost town ===
- Quarry

== Notable people ==
- Philip Allen, member of the Wisconsin State Assembly
- William C. Chynoweth, member of the Illinois House of Representatives
- Sam V. Stewart, Montana Supreme Court Justice and the sixth Governor of Montana

== See also ==
- National Register of Historic Places listings in Monroe County, Ohio
- Petroleum industry in Ohio
