= Ohio State Route 260 =

State highway in southeastern Ohio, US

State Route 260

Route information
- Maintained by ODOT
- Length: 36.67 mi (59.01 km)
- Existed: 1926–present

Major junctions
- South end: SR 7 in Matamoras
- North end: SR 78 near East Union

Location
- Country: United States
- State: Ohio
- Counties: Washington, Monroe, Noble

Highway system
- Ohio State Highway System; Interstate; US; State; Scenic
| ← SR 259 | → SR 261 |

State Route 260 (SR 260) is a 36.67-mile-long (59.01 km) state highway in southeastern Ohio. The route runs from SR 7 in Matamoras to SR 78 near East Union.

== Route description ==
The route is signed as a north–south highway though it runs northwest–southeast between Matamoras and East Union. No part of the route is a part of the National Highway System.

== History ==
SR 260 was first assigned around 1926 on its present alignment between SR 145 in Road Fork to SR 78 near East Union, entirely in Noble County. SR 245 was signed on the present SR 260 route between Matamoras and Bloomfield at SR 26 as well; the section between SR 26 and SR 145 was not a part of the state highway system at the time. By 1933, SR 260 extended east from SR 145 in Monroe County to the community of Marr. Within the next two years, the route was extended south to Bloomfield and absorbed all of SR 245. Since then, no major changes have taken effect on the routing.

== Major intersections ==
| County | Location | mi | km | Destinations | Notes |
|---|---|---|---|---|---|
| Washington | Matamoras | 0.00 | 0.00 | SR 7 (2nd Street / Park Avenue) – Marietta, Clarington | |
| Washington | Ludlow Township | 9.76 | 15.71 | SR 26 south – Marietta | Southern end of SR 26 concurrency |
| Washington | Ludlow Township | 9.98 | 16.06 | SR 26 north – Woodsfield | Northern end of SR 26 concurrency |
| Monroe | Bethel Township | 15.33 | 24.67 | SR 565 west – Lebanon | Eastern terminus of SR 565 |
| Monroe | Bethel Township | 16.52 | 26.59 | SR 537 east to SR 26 | Western terminus of SR 537 |
| Noble | Elk Township | 24.22 | 38.98 | SR 145 south – Lower Salem | Southern end of SR 145 concurrency |
| Noble | Elk Township | 26.07 | 41.96 | SR 145 north – Lewisville | Northern end of SR 145 concurrency |
| Noble | Stock Township | 34.45 | 55.44 | SR 724 east (Pump Station Road) | Western terminus of SR 724 |
| Noble | Stock Township | 36.67 | 59.01 | SR 78 – Caldwell, Lewisville, Summerfield | |
1.000 mi = 1.609 km; 1.000 km = 0.621 mi: Concurrency terminus
