= Ohio State Route 565 =

State highway in southeastern Ohio, US

State Route 565

Route information
- Maintained by ODOT
- Length: 6.98 mi (11.23 km)
- Existed: 1937–present

Major junctions
- West end: SR 145 near Lower Salem
- East end: SR 260 near Graysville

Location
- Country: United States
- State: Ohio
- Counties: Noble, Monroe

Highway system
- Ohio State Highway System; Interstate; US; State; Scenic
| ← SR 564 | → SR 566 |

State Route 565 (SR 565) is a 6.98-mile-long (11.23 km) east–west state highway in the southeastern portion of the U.S. state of Ohio. The western terminus of SR 565 is at a T-intersection with SR 145 nearly 8 miles (13 km) northeast of the village of Lower Salem. Its eastern terminus is also at a T-intersection, this time at SR 260 approximately 7.25 miles (11.67 km) southwest of Graysville.

SR 565 was created in the late 1930s. This two-lane highway traverses primarily forested terrain as it links SR 145 with SR 260. The entirety of the route passes amidst the Wayne National Forest.

== Route description ==
Along its path through the Wayne National Forest, SR 565 passes through the southeastern corner of Noble County and the southwestern portion of Monroe County. The highway begins at a T-intersection with SR 145 in Monroe County's Elk Township. SR 565 is a hilly, curvey route that trends in an easterly fashion through a predominantly wooded terrain, with open fields appearing on occasional, along with a few homes. It intersects a number of township roads along its path through Elk Township, prior to crossing into Noble County's Bethel Township. Upon crossing the county line, SR 565 meets Big Injun Road (Township Road 291, TR 291), then turns toward the south. It bends back into an easterly path just prior to where it meets Lebanon Road (County Road 15, CR 15). SR 565 winds its way in a generally easterly fashion through the forested area to the junction that marks its endpoint, a T-intersection with SR 260.

This state route is not included as a portion of the National Highway System.

== History ==
SR 565 was established in 1937. The original path of SR 565 consisted of the entirety of the currently routing of SR 565, a brief portion of SR 260, and the combination of Mount Hope Ridge Road (TR 565), Dick Scott Hill Road (CR 105C) and Merrill Ridge Road (CR 105), leading to an eastern terminus at SR 26 about 1.50 miles (2.41 km) north of the Washington–Monroe County line. At the time the designation was first applied, the entire length of SR 565 was unpaved.

The portion of SR 565 between SR 260 and SR 26 was removed from the state highway system by 1961, resulting in the highway taking on the routing that it maintains today. During the same time frame, this remaining portion of SR 565 between SR 145 and SR 260 was also hard-surfaced.

== Major intersections ==
| County | Location | mi | km | Destinations | Notes |
|---|---|---|---|---|---|
| Noble | Elk Township | 0.00 | 0.00 | SR 145 – Lower Salem, Lewisville | |
| Monroe | Bethel Township | 6.98 | 11.23 | SR 260 – Matamoras | |
1.000 mi = 1.609 km; 1.000 km = 0.621 mi
