= Ohio State Route 564 =

State highway in Noble County, Ohio, US

State Route 564

Route information
- Maintained by ODOT
- Length: 13.48 mi (21.69 km)
- Existed: 1937–present

Major junctions
- West end: SR 78 in Caldwell
- East end: SR 145 in Jefferson Township

Location
- Country: United States
- State: Ohio
- Counties: Noble

Highway system
- Ohio State Highway System; Interstate; US; State; Scenic
← SR 563	→ SR 565

State Route 564 (SR 564) is a 13.48-mile-long (21.69 km) state highway in Noble County, Ohio, USA. The signed east–west route, though physically more northwest–southeast, begins at SR 78 on the outskirts of Caldwell and ends at SR 145 in Jefferson Township.

== Route description ==
The route begins at an intersection with SR 78 on the southeast corner of Caldwell. It immediately crosses Salt Run before curving to climb a small hill. After two switchback turns, SR 564 reaches the top of the hill and begins to slowly descend in elevation. Soon, the route follows a valley created by the Middle Fork Duck Creek and remains in this valley and occasionally crossing over the aforementioned stream. Just before the main Duck Creek, the route ends at SR 145 just outside the community of Harriettsville. The entire route is two lanes wide and is located within very rural areas punctuated occasionally with small houses.

== History ==
SR 564 was designated a state highway around 1937. It has always followed the SR 78–SR 145 routing since its designation. The route north of the former SR 563 near Middleburg has always been asphalt-paved, the portion south of there was paved by 1958.

== Major intersections ==
The entire route is in Noble County.

Location	mi	km	Destinations	Notes
Caldwell	0.00	0.00	SR 78 (Woodsfield Road)	
Jefferson Township	13.48	21.69	SR 145 – Lewisville, Lower Salem	
1.000 mi = 1.609 km; 1.000 km = 0.621 mi
