= Ohio State Route 724 =

State highway in southeastern Ohio, US

State Route 724

Route information
- Maintained by ODOT
- Length: 4.05 mi (6.52 km)
- Existed: 1937–present

Major junctions
- West end: SR 260 near Summerfield
- East end: SR 145 near Stafford

Location
- Country: United States
- State: Ohio
- Counties: Noble, Monroe

Highway system
- Ohio State Highway System; Interstate; US; State; Scenic
← SR 723	→ SR 725

State Route 724 (SR 724) is a short east-west state highway situated in the southeastern portion of Ohio. The western terminus of this state route is at a T-intersection with State Route 260 nearly 6 miles (9.7 km) southwest of Summerfield in eastern Noble County, and its eastern terminus is at State Route 145 approximately 2 miles (3.2 km) northwest of Stafford in western Monroe County.

== Route description ==
State Route 724 begins at a T-intersection with State Route 260 in eastern Noble County's Stock Township. The entirety of the state highway passes amidst a forest, with the occasional grassy meadow making an appearance at select points along the route. State Route 724 starts out heading easterly, intersecting Noble County Road 43 before bending into a more southeasterly trend, passing Stock Township Highway 232 prior to meeting County Road 45. Here, the state route turns to the east-northeast, and comes across Township Highways 233 and 234 at back-to-back intersections. From Township Highway 234, the remainder of State Route 724 follows a generally eastward trajectory, with thick woods abutting the highway on both sides. After crossing the county line into Monroe County's Franklin Township, the state route ultimately arrives at its endpoint at its junction with State Route 145 northwest of Stafford. Continuing east of State Route 145 after State Route 724 terminates is Franklin Township Highway 834.

No portion of State Route 724 is incorporated within the National Highway System.

== History ==
State Route 724 was established in 1937 along the routing that it currently occupies between State Route 260 and State Route 145. The highway has not experienced any major changes since its inception.

== Major intersections ==
County	Location	mi	km	Destinations	Notes
Noble	Stock Township	0.00	0.00	SR 260	
Monroe	Franklin Township	4.05	6.52	SR 145 – Lewisville, Stafford	
1.000 mi = 1.609 km; 1.000 km = 0.621 mi
