= Ohio State Route 78 =

State highway in Ohio, US

State Route 78

Route information
- Maintained by ODOT
- Length: 104.96 mi (168.92 km)
- Existed: 1924–present

Major junctions
- West end: US 33 / US 33 Bus. / SR 691 in Nelsonville
- SR 60 in McConnelsville; I-77 in Caldwell; SR 26 / SR 800 in Woodsfield
- East end: SR 7 in Clarington

Location
- Country: United States
- State: Ohio
- Counties: Athens, Hocking, Morgan, Noble, Monroe

Highway system
- Ohio State Highway System; Interstate; US; State; Scenic
← SR 77	→ SR 79

State Route 78 (SR 78) is a state highway that runs for 105 miles (169 km) from Nelsonville to Clarington in the U.S. state of Ohio. Car and Driver has called it one of the most scenic highways nationwide. The stretch of this highway that runs along the south side of Burr Oak State Park in Morgan County, Ohio, is well known for its extreme curves and views, and is sometimes locally referred to as the "Rim of the World." Much of this highway runs through old coal-producing areas.

SR 78 is an Ohio Scenic Byway and is considered as part of the Appalachian Byway.

== Major intersections ==
County	Location	mi	km	Destinations	Notes
Athens	Nelsonville	0.00– 0.46	0.00– 0.74	US 33 / US 33 Bus. west / SR 691 south – Logan, Athens, Hocking College	Interchange; eastern terminus of US 33 Bus., northern terminus of SR 691
Athens	Buchtel	3.10	4.99	SR 685 east	Western terminus of SR 685
Hocking	No major junctions				
Athens	No major junctions				
Hocking	Murray City	6.94	11.17	SR 216 north (Locust Street) – New Straitsville	Southern terminus of SR 216
Athens	Glouster	12.05	19.39	SR 13 south (High Street) – Chauncey	Western end of SR 13 concurrency
Athens	Glouster	13.07	21.03	SR 13 north – New Lexington	Eastern end of SR 13 concurrency
Morgan	Union Township	23.23	37.39	SR 555 north – Portersville	Western end of SR 555 concurrency
Morgan	Union Township	23.35	37.58	SR 555 south – Chesterhill	Eastern end of SR 555 concurrency
Morgan	Malta Township	30.68	49.37	SR 377 south / CR 98 (Cordray Road) – Sharpsburg, Chesterhill, Pennsville	Northern terminus of SR 377
Morgan	Malta Township	31.35	50.45	SR 37 west – New Lexington	Western end of SR 37 concurrency
Morgan	Malta	32.60	52.46	SR 669 west (Main Street) – Deavertown	Eastern terminus of SR 669
Morgan	McConnelsville	32.81	52.80	SR 60 north / SR 37 ends – Zanesville	Eastern end of SR 37 concurrency; western end of SR 60 concurrency
Morgan	McConnelsville	33.36	53.69	SR 376 north (Kennebec Avenue)	Western end of SR 376 concurrency
Morgan	McConnelsville	33.43	53.80	SR 60 south / SR 376 south (Main Street) / 7th Street – Beverly, Marietta	Eastern end of SR 60 / SR 376 concurrencies
Morgan	Morgan Township	35.63	57.34	SR 607 south (Monastery Road)	Northern terminus of SR 607
Morgan	Bristol Township	42.36	68.17	SR 83 north – Cumberland	Western end of SR 83 concurrency
Morgan	Manchester Township	45.21	72.76	SR 83 south – Beverly	Eastern end of SR 83 concurrency
Noble	Olive Township	58.24– 58.45	93.73– 94.07	I-77 – Marietta, Cleveland	Exit 25 (I-77)
Noble	Olive Township	58.82	94.66	SR 821 – Caldwell, Dexter City	
Noble	Caldwell	60.19	96.87	SR 564 east – Harriettsville	Western terminus of SR 564
Noble	Center Township	63.86	102.77	SR 147 north – Sarahsville, Barnesville	Southern terminus of SR 147
Noble	Stock Township	67.66	108.89	SR 260 south – Carlisle	Northern terminus of SR 260
Noble	Summerfield	71.44	114.97	SR 146 west (Main Street) / CR 1 (Lexington Ridge Road)	Eastern terminus of SR 146
Monroe	Seneca Township	74.77	120.33	SR 379 east	Western terminus of SR 379
Monroe	Lewisville	81.34	130.90	SR 145 (Malaga Street) – Malaga, Lower Salem	
Monroe	Woodsfield	88.50	142.43	SR 26 / SR 800 (Main Street) – Jerusalem, Barnesville, Antioch	
Monroe	Adams Township	96.20	154.82	SR 536 south – Hannibal	Northern terminus of SR 536
Monroe	Clarington	104.96	168.92	SR 7 – Powhatan Point, Matamoras	
1.000 mi = 1.609 km; 1.000 km = 0.621 mi: Concurrency terminus
