= Ohio State Route 26 =

State highway in southeastern Ohio, US

State Route 26

Route information
- Maintained by ODOT
- Length: 66.91 mi (107.68 km)
- Existed: 1924–present

Major junctions
- South end: SR 7 in Marietta
- SR 78 in Woodsfield
- North end: SR 148 / CR 26 near Jerusalem

Location
- Country: United States
- State: Ohio
- Counties: Washington, Monroe, Belmont

Highway system
- Ohio State Highway System; Interstate; US; State; Scenic
| ← SR 25 | → US 27 |

State Route 26 (SR 26) is a 67-mile-long (108 km) north–south route in south eastern Ohio spanning from SR 7 in Marietta to SR 148 between Jerusalem and Bethesda. SR 26 also passes through Graysville and Woodsfield. Where the state route designation ends in Wayne Township, the road continues north as Belmont County Road 26 where it connects to the Barkcamp State Park and the National Road. Much of the route parallels the Little Muskingum River and travels through the heart of Wayne National Forest's Marietta Unit.

== Route description ==
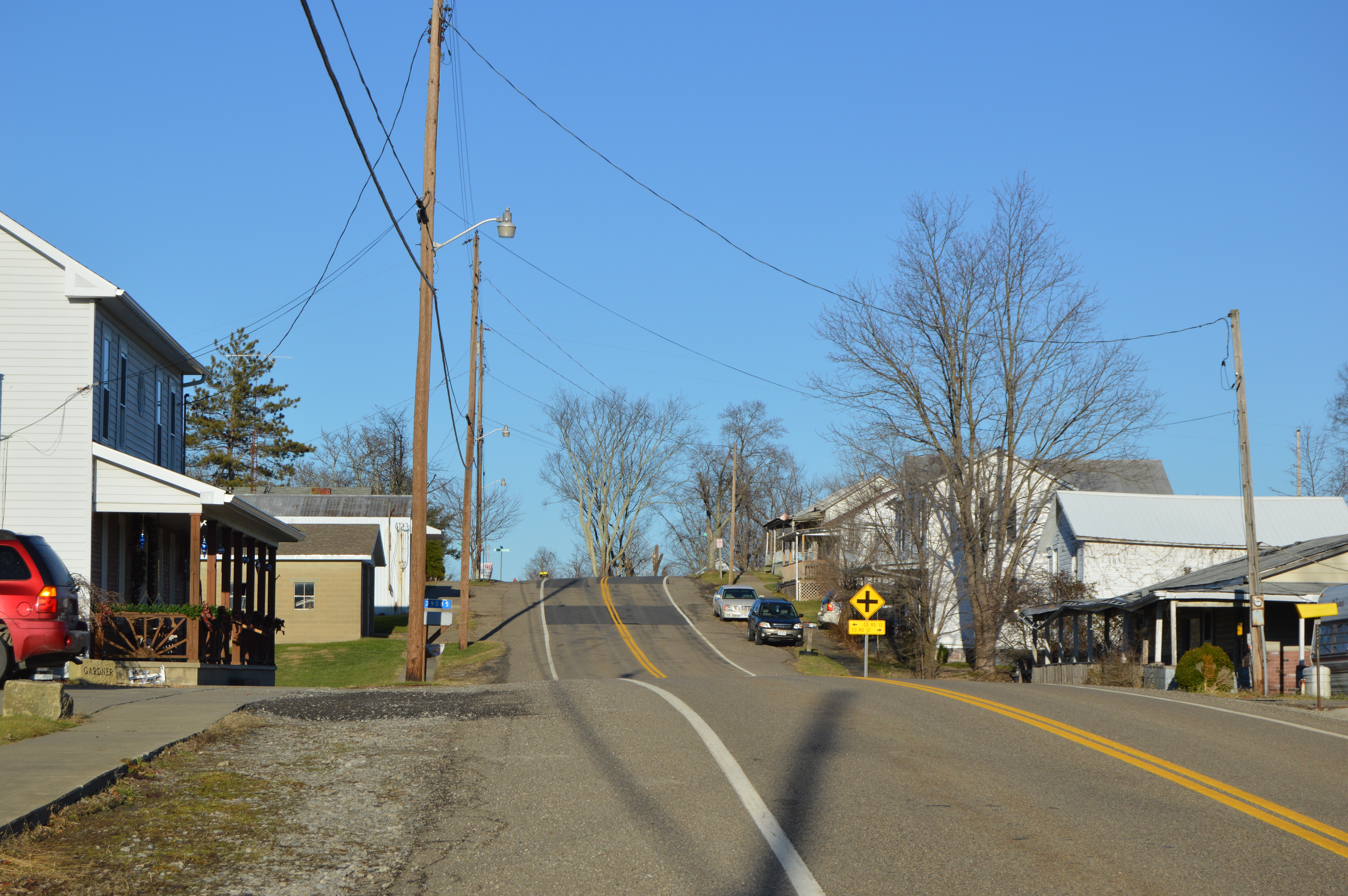
SR 26 as the main street in Graysville

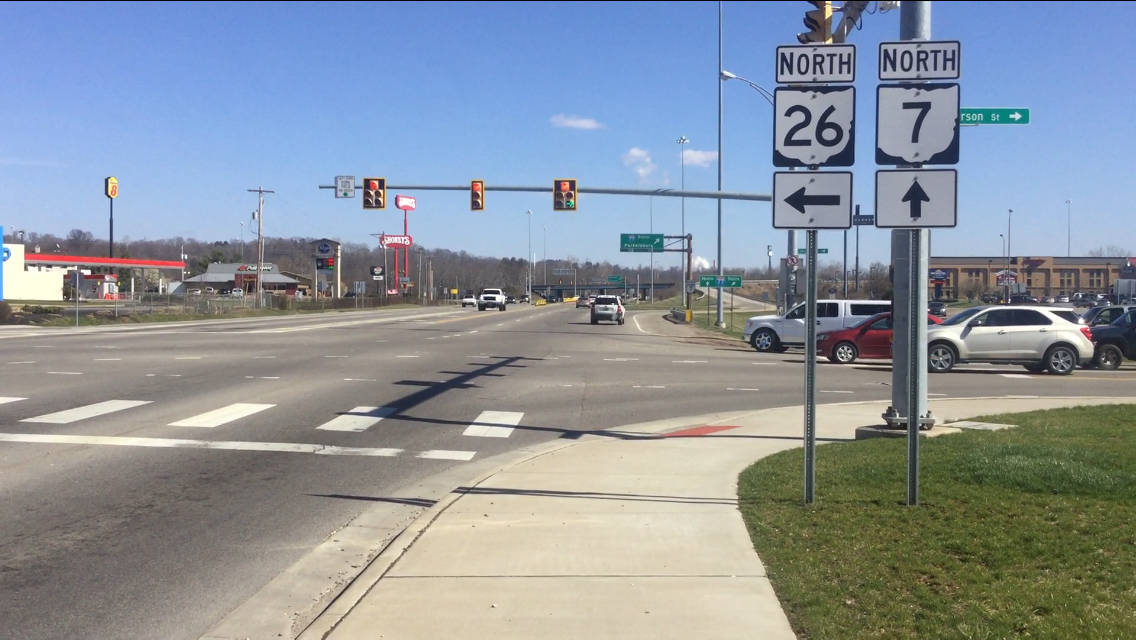
Southern terminus of SR 26 in Marietta

SR 26 begins at the intersection of Pike Street and Acme Street in Marietta. Pike Street is also designated SR 7. In 2014, the previous routing for SR 26 through Marietta was abandoned and SR 26 was rerouted onto Acme Street. After following Acme Street for about 1,000 ft, SR 26 turns east onto Greene Street. The route heads around the side of a hill before passing under Interstate 77 and crossing the Duck Creek, SR 26 heads into more hilly terrain generally following valleys formed by streams and rivers. Upon entering the Wayne National Forest, the route generally parallels the Little Muskingum River. About 25 miles (40 km) from the terminus, SR 26 encounters its first state highway, SR 260. SR 26 and SR 260 form a 0.2-mile-long (0.32 km) concurrency. Upon exiting Washington County and entering Monroe County, SR 26 heads in a more northerly direction and no longer parallels the Little Muskingum River. After intersecting SR 537's eastern terminus, SR 26 climbs a hill and passes through the village of Graysville. After briefly following the Little Muskingum River again, SR 26 reaches SR 800 and the two routes together head north towards Woodsfield. In Woodsfield, SR 26 and SR 800 travel along Main Street, exit the Wayne National Forest, and intersect SR 78 (Court Street) in the center of town.

North of downtown Woodsfield, SR 800 breaks away at Oaklawn Avenue, while SR 26 continues north. At the Monroe County Airport, the route heads east through a mountainous region of Center Township. The route makes several hairpin curves around its crossing of the Sunfish Creek but heads in a north-northwest direction after ascending a hill. In the village of Jerusalem, SR 26 shares a concurrency with SR 145 east out of the town; the two routes split before reaching the village of Wilson. Almost immediately, SR 26 enters Wayne Township, Belmont County heading north. The route crosses the Captina Creek and a fork of the aforementioned creek before ending at SR 148 at a four-way intersection including CR 26, a former segment of SR 26.

== History ==
The segment of SR 26 between Marietta and Woodsfield has been a part of the state highway system since 1912 as SR 389. In 1923, SR 26 was designated on all of former SR 389 between Marietta and Woodsfield and west across the southern side of the state to Dunlop in Hamilton County (near Cincinnati). In 1927, as most of this extension had been co-signed with U.S. Route 50, SR 26 was truncated to SR 31 (modern-day US 33) between Athens and Chauncey with the remainder west of there signed as US 50 and SR 126 between Dunlop and Milford. Two years later, the southern terminus of SR 26 was moved to Marietta when the Athens–Marietta segment became a part of US 50N (now mostly SR 550). In 1937, SR 26 was extended north along unimproved roads from Woodsfield through Jerusalem and Bethesda to Morristown at US 40. In 1962, the northern terminus was moved out of Morristown to SR 147 in Bethesda, and was truncated to SR 148 in 1979. All portions of the former SR 26 north of SR 148 are now county-maintained and designated as Belmont County Route 26. Between 2012 and 2014, SR 26 experienced a small truncation in Marietta when its southern terminus was moved from the intersection of Greene Street and 3rd Street. This change did not affect ownership of roads as the segment removed from SR 26 was also a part of SR 7 and SR 60.

== Major intersections ==
| County | Location | mi | km | Destinations | Notes |
|---|---|---|---|---|---|
| Washington | Marietta | 0.00 | 0.00 | SR 7 (Pike Street) | |
| Washington | Ludlow Township | 24.74 | 39.82 | SR 260 south – Matamoras | Southern end of SR 260 concurrency |
| Washington | Ludlow Township | 24.96 | 40.17 | SR 260 north – Marr | Northern end of SR 260 concurrency |
| Monroe | Washington Township | 34.95 | 56.25 | SR 537 west – Marr | Eastern terminus of SR 537 |
| Monroe | Center Township | 43.96 | 70.75 | SR 800 south – Antioch, Fly | Southern end of SR 800 concurrency |
| Monroe | Woodsfield | 46.27 | 74.46 | SR 78 (Court Street) – Caldwell, Lewisville, Clarington | |
| Monroe | Woodsfield | 46.27 | 74.46 | SR 800 north (Oaklawn Avenue) / North Street – Barnesville | Northern end of SR 800 concurrency |
| Monroe | Jerusalem | 58.81 | 94.65 | SR 145 west (Main Street) – Malaga | Southern end of SR 145 concurrency |
| Monroe | Sunsbury Township | 59.46 | 95.69 | SR 145 east – Beallsville | Northern end of SR 145 concurrency |
| Belmont | Wayne Township | 66.91 | 107.68 | SR 148 (West Captina Highway) / CR 26 – Powhatan Point, Barnesville, Barkcamp State Park | |
1.000 mi = 1.609 km; 1.000 km = 0.621 mi: Concurrency terminus
