= Summit Township, Monroe County, Ohio =

Township in Ohio, US

- Township
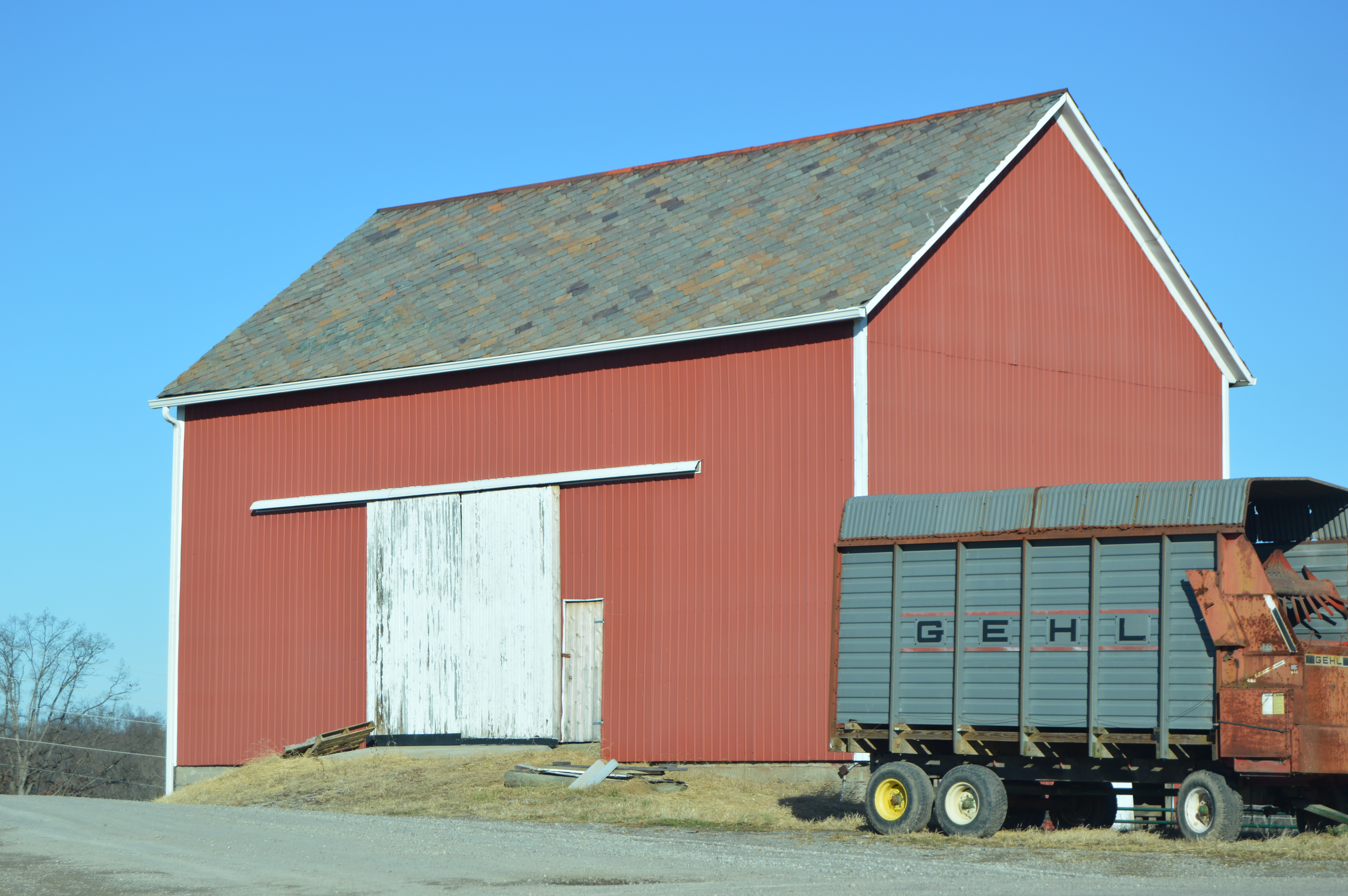
- Barn on State Route 145 west of Lewisville

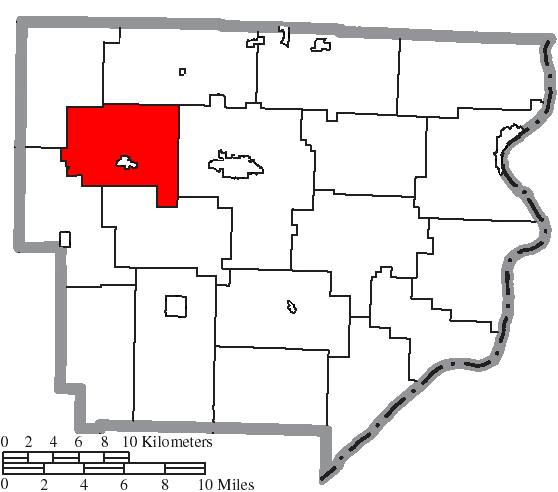
- Location of Summit Township in Monroe County
- Coordinates: 39°46′14″N 81°13′7″W
- Country: United States
- State: Ohio
- County: Monroe

Area
  - Total: 23.0 sq mi (59.6 km^{2})
  - Land: 23.0 sq mi (59.6 km^{2})
  - Water: 0 sq mi (0.0 km^{2})
- Elevation: 1,250 ft (380 m)

Population (2020)
  - Total: 595
  - Density: 25.9/sq mi (9.98/km^{2})
- Time zone: UTC-5 (Eastern (EST))
  - Summer (DST): UTC-4 (EDT)
- FIPS code: 39-75497
- GNIS feature ID: 1086659

Summit Township is one of the eighteen townships of Monroe County, Ohio, United States. As of the 2020 census, the population was 595, including 184 people in the village of Lewisville.

== Geography ==
Located in the northwestern part of the county, it borders the following townships:

- Malaga Township - north
- Center Township - east
- Wayne Township - south
- Franklin Township - southwest
- Seneca Township - northwest

The village of Lewisville is located in central Summit Township.

== Name and history ==
It is the only Summit Township statewide.

== Government ==
The township is governed by a three-member board of trustees, who are elected in November of odd-numbered years to a four-year term beginning on the following January 1. Two are elected in the year after the presidential election and one is elected in the year before it. There is also an elected township fiscal officer, who serves a four-year term beginning on April 1 of the year after the election, which is held in November of the year before the presidential election. Vacancies in the fiscal officership or on the board of trustees are filled by the remaining trustees.
