= Ohio State Route 145 =

State highway in southeastern Ohio, US

State Route 145

Route information
- Maintained by ODOT
- Length: 46.14 mi (74.26 km)
- Existed: 1923–present

Major junctions
- South end: SR 821 in Lower Salem
- North end: SR 148 near Beallsville

Location
- Country: United States
- State: Ohio
- Counties: Washington, Noble, Monroe, Belmont

Highway system
- Ohio State Highway System; Interstate; US; State; Scenic
← SR 144	→ SR 146

State Route 145 (SR 145, OH 145) is a 46.14-mile (74.26 km) long north–south state highway in the southeastern quadrant of the U.S. state of Ohio. Its western terminus is at a T-intersection with SR 821 in Lower Salem while its eastern terminus is at a T-intersection with SR 148, approximately 5.25 miles (8.45 km) northeast of Beallsville.

== Route description ==
Along its path, SR 145 passes through northern Washington County, the southeastern Noble County, northwestern Monroe County and southern Belmont County. No part of SR 145 is included as a part of the National Highway System.

== History ==
The SR 145 designation was applied in 1923. It was originally routed from its southern terminus in Lower Salem to its junction with SR 78 in Lewisville. SR 145 was extended to the north in 1937, routed from SR 78 in Lewisville to then-SR 8 in Malaga.

== Major intersections ==
County	Location	mi	km	Destinations	Notes
Washington	Lower Salem	0.00	0.00	SR 821	
Noble	Jefferson Township	6.09	9.80	SR 564 west	Eastern terminus of SR 564
Noble	Elk Township	8.54	13.74	SR 565 east	Western terminus of SR 565
Noble	Elk Township	10.34	16.64	SR 260 south	Southern end of SR 260 concurrency
Noble	Elk Township	12.19	19.62	SR 260 north	Northern end of SR 260 concurrency
Monroe	Franklin Township	18.62	29.97	SR 724 west	Eastern terminus of SR 724
Monroe	Lewisville	24.14	38.85	SR 78	
Monroe	Malaga Township	33.51	53.93	SR 800	
Monroe	Jerusalem	36.05	58.02	SR 26 south	Southern end of SR 26 concurrency
Monroe	Sunsbury Township	37.70	60.67	SR 26 north	Northern end of SR 26 concurrency
Monroe	Beallsville	40.38	64.99	SR 556 east	Western terminus of SR 556
Belmont	Washington Township	46.14	74.26	SR 148	
1.000 mi = 1.609 km; 1.000 km = 0.621 mi: Concurrency terminus
