= Elk Township, Ohio =

Elk Township, Ohio, may refer to:

- Elk Township, Noble County, Ohio
- Elk Township, Vinton County, Ohio

== See also ==
- Elkrun Township, Ohio
