= Liberty Township, Washington County, Ohio =

Township in Ohio, US

- Township
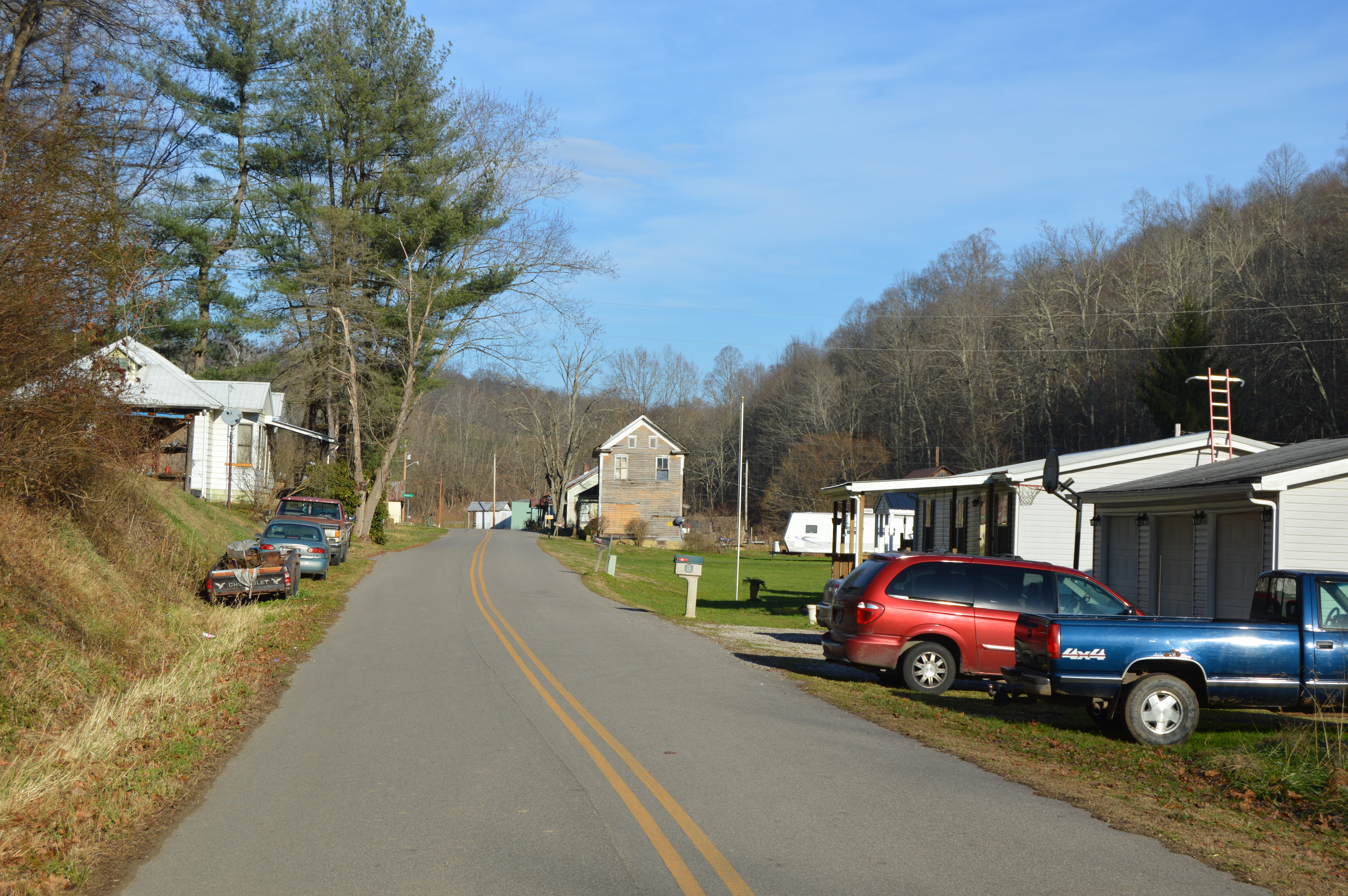
- Roadside in Germantown

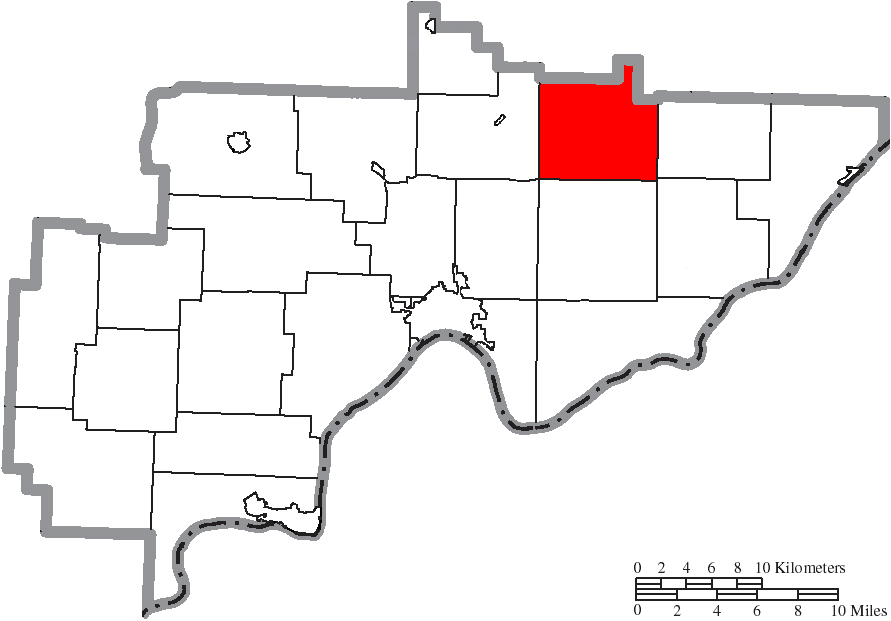
- Location of Liberty Township in Washington County
- Coordinates: 39°33′22″N 81°18′33″W
- Country: United States
- State: Ohio
- County: Washington

Area
  - Total: 29.5 sq mi (76.4 km^{2})
  - Land: 29.5 sq mi (76.4 km^{2})
  - Water: 0 sq mi (0.0 km^{2})
- Elevation: 971 ft (296 m)

Population (2020)
  - Total: 438
  - Density: 14.8/sq mi (5.73/km^{2})
- Time zone: UTC-5 (Eastern (EST))
  - Summer (DST): UTC-4 (EDT)
- FIPS code: 39-43386
- GNIS feature ID: 1087136

Liberty Township is one of the twenty-two townships of Washington County, Ohio, United States. The 2020 census found 438 people in the township.

== Geography ==
Located in the northeastern part of the county, it borders the following townships:

- Elk Township, Noble County - north
- Bethel Township, Monroe County - northeast
- Ludlow Township - east
- Independence Township - southeast
- Lawrence Township - south
- Fearing Township - southwest corner
- Salem Township - west

No municipalities are located in Liberty Township, although the unincorporated community of Germantown lies in the township's northeast.

== Name and history ==
It is one of twenty-five Liberty Townships statewide.

== Government ==
The township is governed by a three-member board of trustees, who are elected in November of odd-numbered years to a four-year term beginning on the following January 1. Two are elected in the year after the presidential election and one is elected in the year before it. There is also an elected township fiscal officer, who serves a four-year term beginning on April 1 of the year after the election, which is held in November of the year before the presidential election. Vacancies in the fiscal officership or on the board of trustees are filled by the remaining trustees.
