= Ohio State Route 723 =

State highway in Guernsey County, Ohio, US

State Route 723

Route information
- Maintained by ODOT
- Length: 0.85 mi (1,370 m)

Major junctions
- South end: I-70 near Cambridge
- North end: US 22 / US 40 in Cambridge

Location
- Country: United States
- State: Ohio
- Counties: Guernsey

Highway system
- Ohio State Highway System; Interstate; US; State; Scenic
← SR 722	→ SR 724

State Route 723 (SR 723) is a very short state highway located in east-central Ohio. Having a length of just 0.85 miles (1.37 km) and located just southwest of Cambridge, the route serves as a connector between Interstate 70 (I-70) at its exit 176 and the concurrency of U.S. Route 22 (US 22) and US 40.

== Route description ==
The short SR 723 commences at I-70's exit 176, a trumpet interchange in Guernsey County's Cambridge Township. Heading north from I-70 as a four-lane highway, SR 723 passes over the CSX railway and crosses the city limits of Cambridge. A short distance later, SR 723 comes to an end as it meets US 22 and US 40 at a signalized T-intersection.

SR 723 is not considered a part of the National Highway System.

== History ==
The roadway that carries SR 723 was constructed by 1961. For the first few years of its existence, SR 723 served as the western end of a section of I-70 that was complete. By 1967, I-70 was navigable in both directions from SR 723. Since then, no major changes have occurred to the route.

== Major intersections ==
The entire route is in Guernsey County.

Location	mi	km	Destinations	Notes
Cambridge Township	0.00– 0.56	0.00– 0.90	I-70 – Columbus, Wheeling, WV	Exit 176 (I-70)
Cambridge	0.85	1.37	US 22 / US 40 – Cambridge	
1.000 mi = 1.609 km; 1.000 km = 0.621 mi
