= Ohio State Route 607 =

State highway in Morgan County, Ohio, US

State Route 607
- Monastery Road

Route information
- Maintained by ODOT
- Length: 1.688 mi (2.717 km)
- Existed: 2011–present
- History: Unsigned until July 25, 2013

Major junctions
- South end: SR 60 near McConnelsville
- North end: SR 78 near McConnelsville

Location
- Country: United States
- State: Ohio
- Counties: Morgan

Highway system
- Ohio State Highway System; Interstate; US; State; Scenic
← SR 606	→ SR 608

State Route 607 (SR 607) is a north–south highway near McConnelsville, Ohio. The route starts at SR 60 and travels north to its terminus at SR 78, all located inside Morgan County. SR 607 was designated in 2011, after Monastery Road was transferred from township-maintenance to state-maintenance. The road was then repaved and realigned in 2012, and became signed on July 25, 2013. The route opened to the public on the next day.

== Route description ==
All of SR 607 is located in central Morgan County, Ohio. The state route starts at the intersection of SR 60 near McConnelsville. SR 607 travels north for the majority of the length. SR 607 passes near an Ohio Department of Transportation (ODOT) county garage near the beginning of the road. Halfway through the route, SR 607 meets Township Road 696 in a T-intersection, where the route moves slightly westward. After that, there is an Ohio Army National Guard training site at Hawk Drive. The route keeps moving north until it ends at SR 78 at another T-intersection. The route goes through mostly forests and small hills. In 2012, ODOT calculated 1,975 vehicles traveling south of McGovern Lane. This is expressed in terms of annual average daily traffic (AADT), a measure of traffic volume for any average day of the year.

== History ==
Planning of Monastery Road (Township Road 209) improvements began in 2003. At that time, $3.8 million in state funding was set aside for the project, but the Ohio Department of Transportation (ODOT) did not receive the money until 2005. By 2007, most of the earmarked money was spent on preliminary engineering and planning. Without the money, Morgan Township officials could not afford to upgrade the road, and ODOT was barred from spending money on local roads. In 2011, deputy director Steve Williams devised a new plan that made the township road a state route, and Morgan Township officials transferred the road to ODOT.

Monastery Road was closed 0.7 mi (1.1 km) north of SR 60, and 0.4 mi (0.64 km) south of SR 78 in April 2012, for nine months. The road was realigned and resurfaced, and it cost around $1.5 million. The road was also widened at the northern terminus with SR 78, and the southern terminus with SR 60. On July 25, 2013, ODOT erected state route signs on the road. The next day, Williams announced the upgrade of Monastery Road to State Route 607 and reopened the road.

== Major intersections ==
The entire route is in Morgan Township, Morgan County.

mi	km	Destinations	Notes
0.000	0.000	SR 60 (Marietta Road)	
1.688	2.717	SR 78	
1.000 mi = 1.609 km; 1.000 km = 0.621 mi
