= East Union, Noble County, Ohio =

Unincorporated community in Ohio, U.S.

Coordinates: 39°46′04″N 81°24′02″W

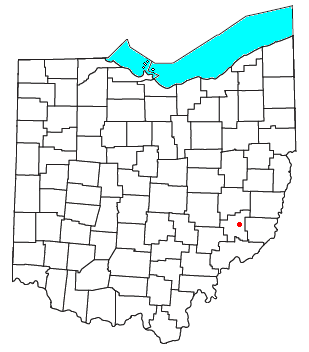
Location of East Union in Noble County, Ohio

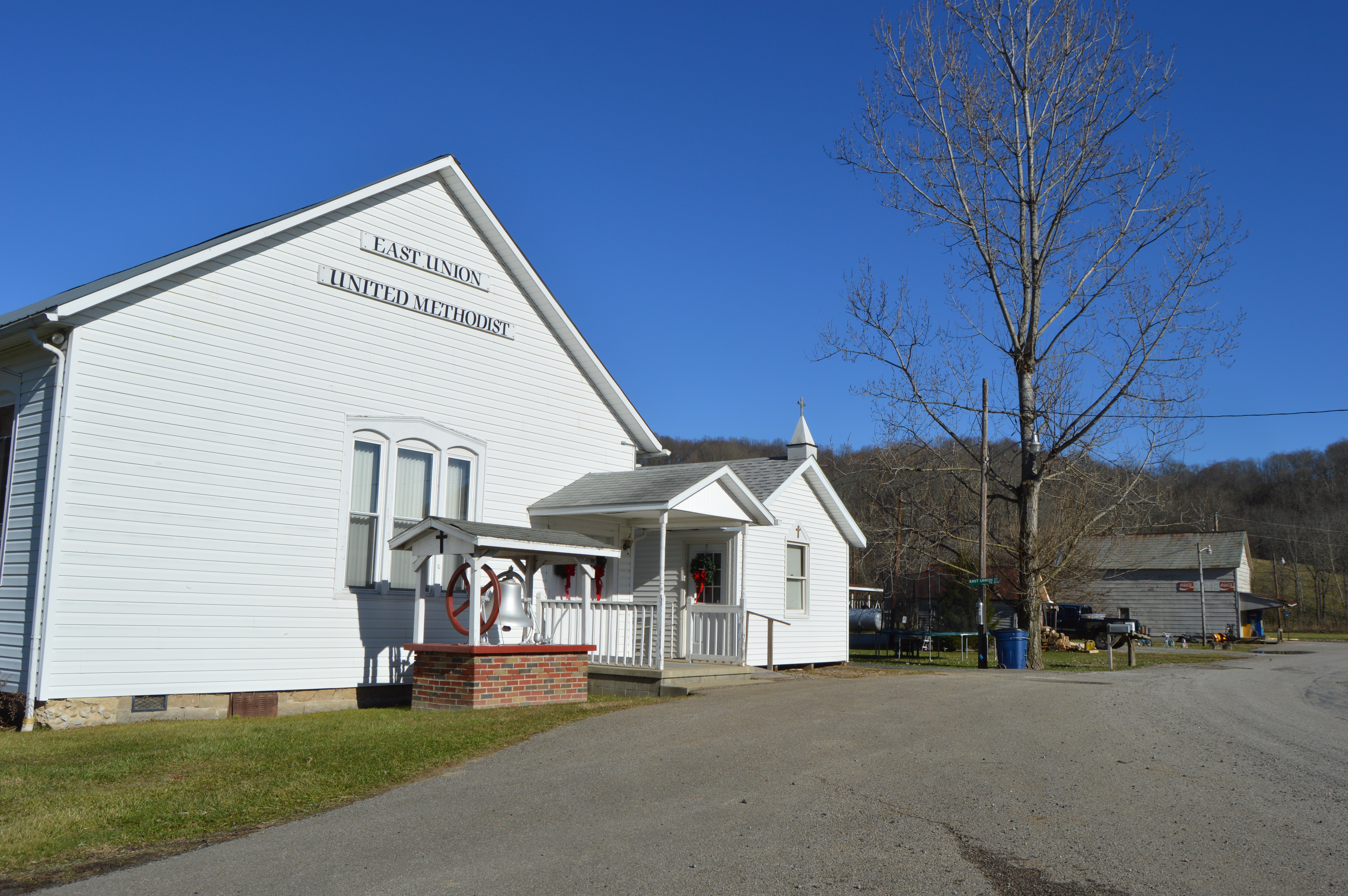
Doshie Road

East Union is an unincorporated community in northwestern Stock Township, Noble County, Ohio, United States. It lies at the intersection of State Route 78 with County Road 6. The headwaters of Buffalo Creek, a tributary of the Muskingum River through Wills Creek, are located around East Union. It is located 7 miles (10½ km) east of Caldwell, the county seat of Noble County.

== History ==
East Union was the site of the first permanent Roman Catholic settlement in Ohio. The community was founded in 1803 or 1804 under the name of "the Archer settlement" by several families, including one Catholic. Originally, East Union was the north end of the Archer settlement, which extended southward to Crumtown.

East Union was platted in 1856.
