= William Gladstone Steel =

American journalist (1854-1934)

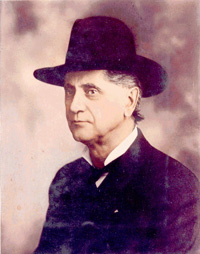
- Steel is known as "Father of Crater Lake"
- Born: September 7, 1854; Stafford, Ohio
- Died: October 21, 1934 (aged 80); Medford, Oregon
- Occupation: Journalist
- Known for: Crater Lake National Park

William Gladstone Steel (September 7, 1854 – October 21, 1934) was an American journalist who was known for campaigning for 17 years for the United States Congress to designate Crater Lake as a National Park. Steel was from Ohio, and worked in the newspaper business before becoming a mail carrier.

== Early life ==
William Steel was born on September 7, 1854, in Stafford, Ohio, to Elizabeth Lawrie and William Steel, Scottish-born abolitionists who were active in the Underground Railroad. Steel's brother, George A. Steel, became Oregon State Treasurer. His sister, Jane, attended St. Mary's School in Medford, Oregon.

On March 25, 1868 the Steel family moved from Pittsburgh, Pennsylvania to a farm near Oswego, Kansas. While a schoolboy in Kansas, in May 1870, Steel read an article, in the newspaper wrapping his lunch, about the discovery of Crater Lake.

== Crater Lake ==
Steel first visited Crater Lake in 1885, traveling by railroad and then stagecoach to Fort Klamath. He then walked 20 miles (32 km), arriving at the lake on August 15, 1885. Steel published an article describing his reactions as he viewed the lake for the first time in the March 1886 issue of West Shore magazine.

Steel was a member of the Portland Alpine Club, the first alpine club in the West, and then helped found Mazamas after the Portland Alpine Club folded.

=== Promotion of National Park ===
Steel guided influential people around the Crater Lake area, leading nature hikes and giving campfire lectures about the lake's geography, plants and animals, much like a contemporary interpretive Park Ranger. Steel publicized Crater Lake by hosting the Mazamas convention and mountain climbing tour in 1896. Hundreds of people, including politicians, scientists and climbers, spent three weeks in the area. At the close of the convention, fireworks were lit on Wizard Island, and the group ceremoniously christened the volcano that once stood where the lake is, which the Klamath people had called giiwas for 10,000 years, calling it Mount Mazama.

Steel's lobbying led to the designation of Crater Lake National Park as the sixth US National Park. He was not the first superintendent of the park, but did manage to get the first superintendent ousted in what was known as the "Crater Lake Rumble". Steel believed it was important to develop the lake to bring the public to the lake, including selling the idea of a lodge and an encircling road at the crater's rim, but he also envisioned an elevator to take people to the lake's surface, and roads around the lake itself and to Wizard Island for cars. After three years, Steel was removed as superintendent of the park.

== Later life ==
Steel became known as "The Judge", and the "father of Crater Lake", described as a "one-man chamber of commerce". He last visited the park in 1932, and died in Medford in 1934. Mount Steel in the Olympic Mountains is named in his honor.
