= Germantown, Washington County, Ohio =

Coordinates: 39°35′02″N 81°19′03″W

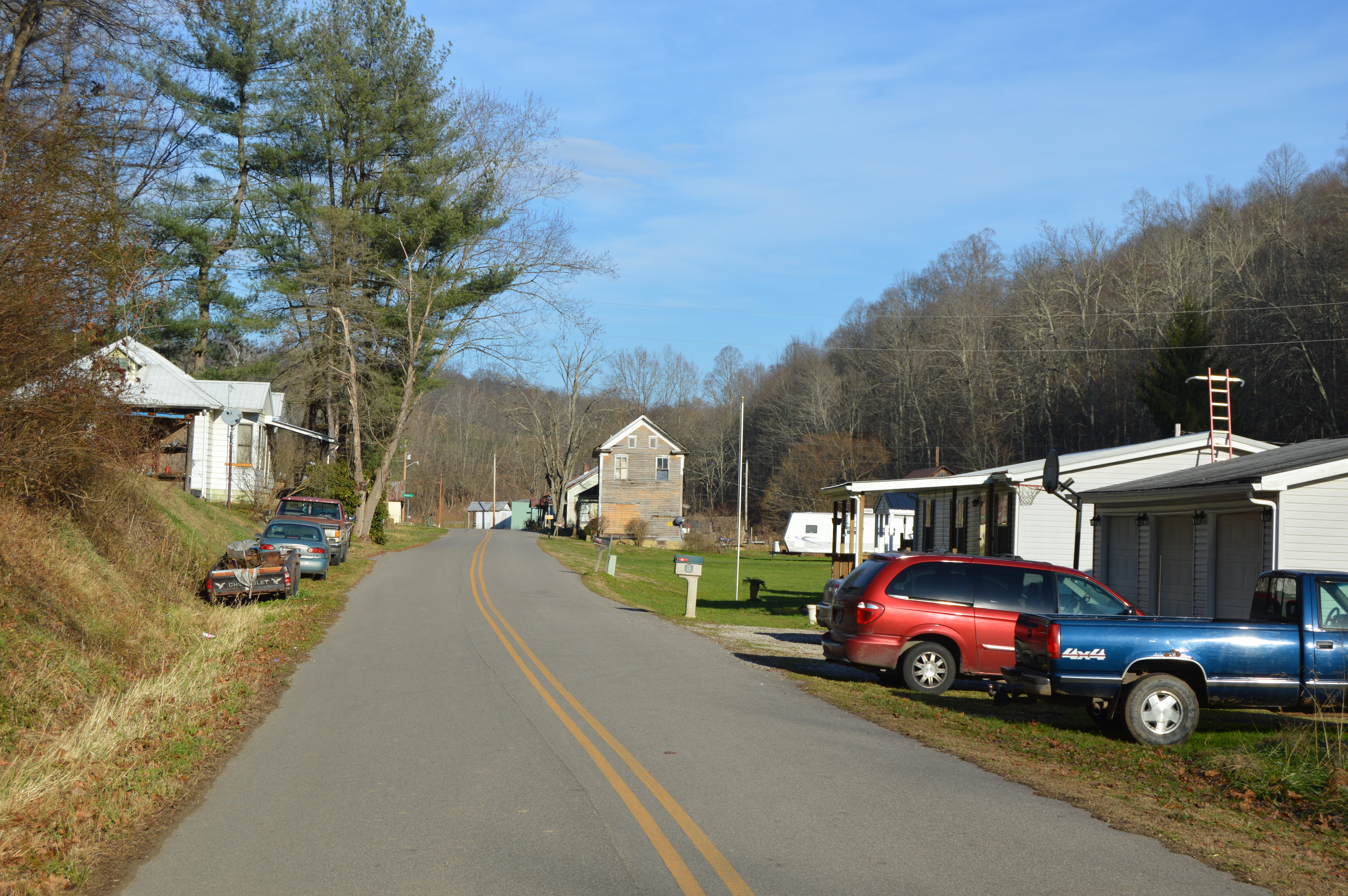
Houses on Germantown Road

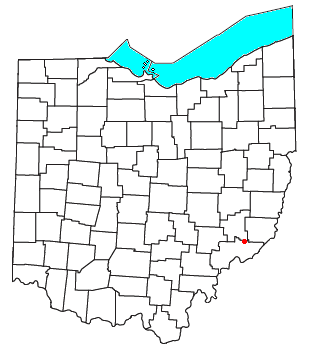
Location of Germantown in Washington County, Ohio

Germantown is an unincorporated community in northern Liberty Township, Washington County, Ohio, United States. It lies along Paw Paw Creek near the boundary with Noble County.

== History ==
Germantown had its start when a sawmill was built there. The town site was laid out in 1852.
