= Harriettsville, Ohio =

Unincorporated community in Ohio, U.S.

Coordinates: 39°37′53″N 81°20′15″W

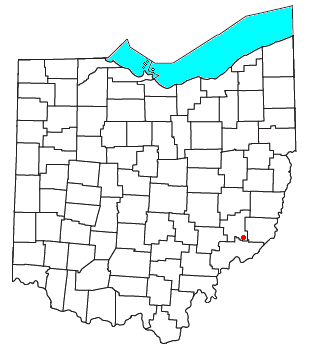
Location of Harriettsville, Ohio

Harriettsville is an unincorporated community in western Elk Township, Noble County, Ohio, United States. It lies along State Route 145 at its intersection with County Road 46. The East Fork of Duck Creek, a subsidiary of the Ohio River that meets the river near Marietta, runs along State Route 145 past the community. It lies 8 miles (13 km) northeast of Lower Salem by road, and 13 miles (21 km) directly southeast of Caldwell, the county seat of Noble County.

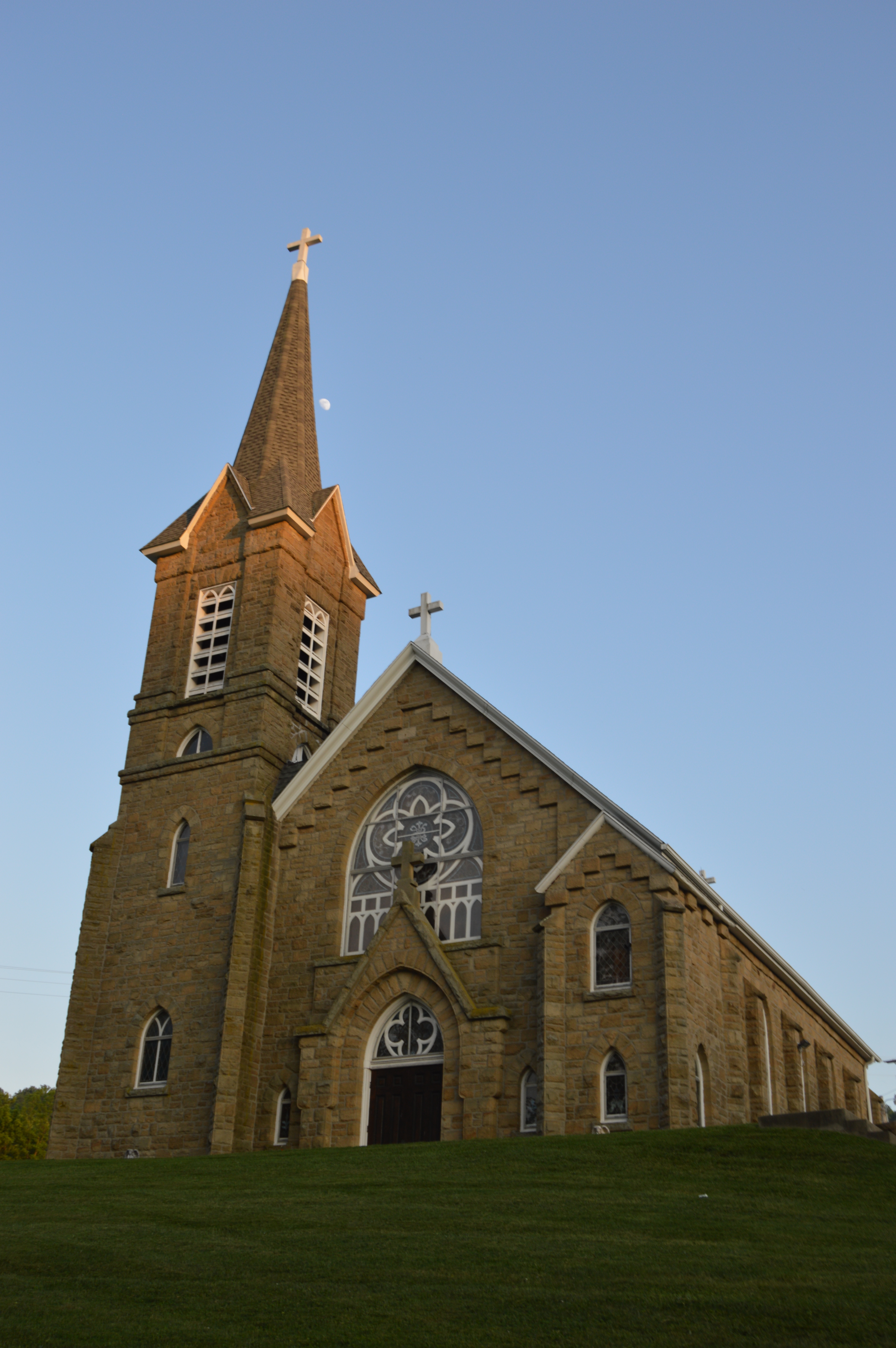
St. Henry's Church

== History ==
Harriettsville was laid out in 1839, and named for Harriett Spencer, the daughter of a first settler, named Moses T. Spencer. Spencer settled in Ohio with his sister Rebecca Chamberlain née Spencer and his brother, Amos Spencer, from Allegany County, MD around 1830. A post office was established at Harriettsville in 1839, and remained in operation until 1964.
