= Franklin Township, Monroe County, Ohio =

Township in Ohio, US

- Township
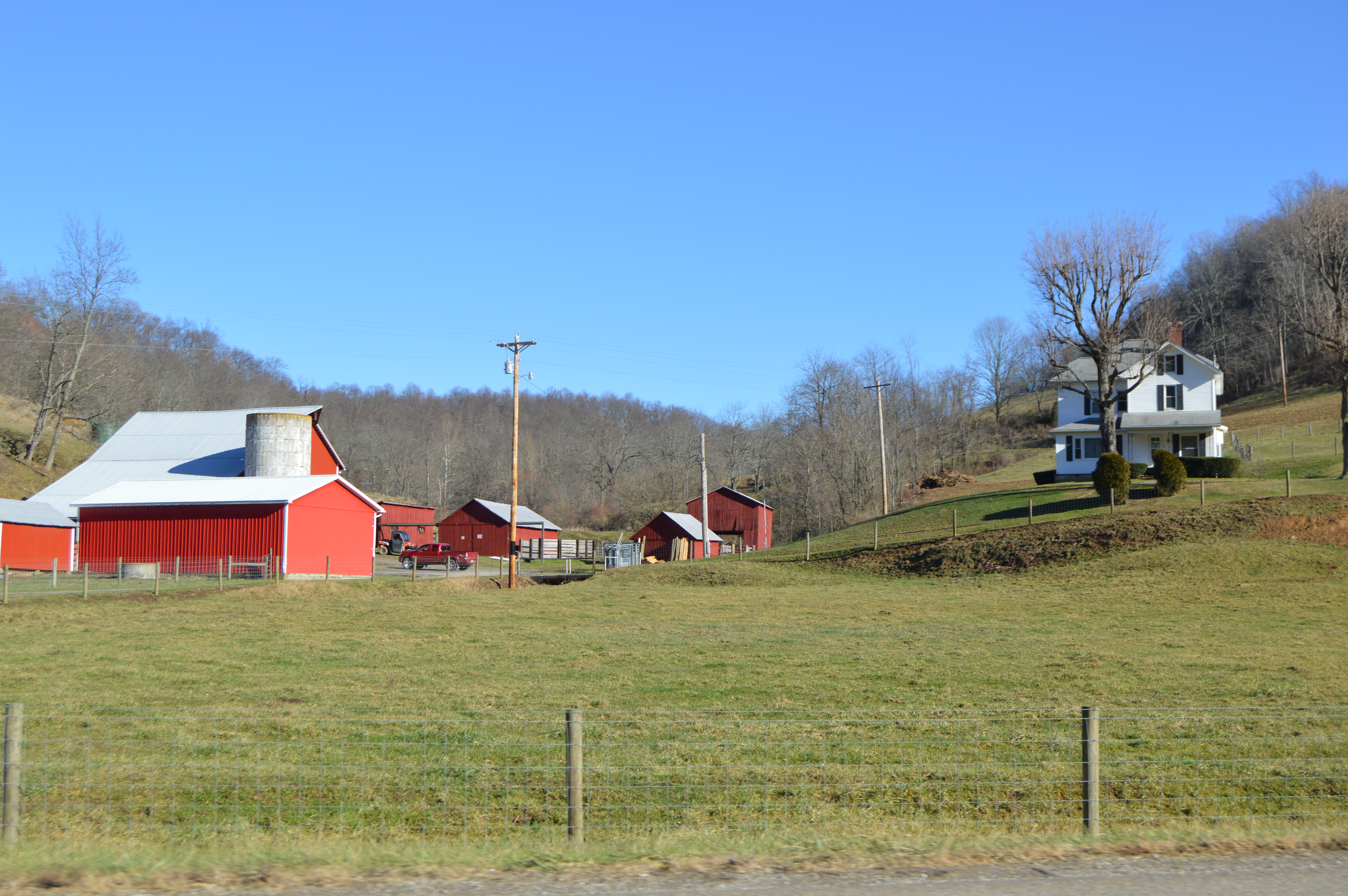
- Farmstead on State Route 78

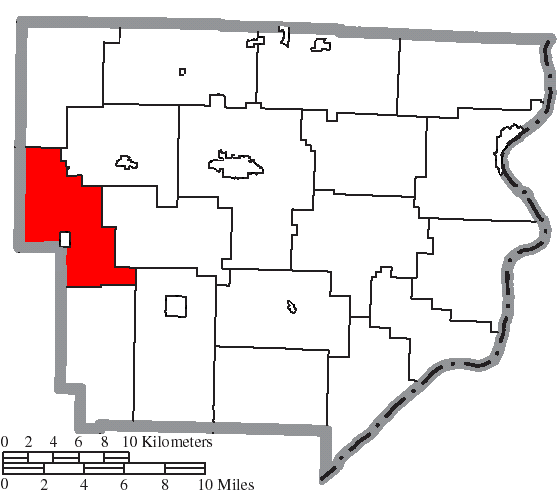
- Location of Franklin Township in Monroe County
- Coordinates: 39°43′7″N 81°15′58″W
- Country: United States
- State: Ohio
- County: Monroe

Area
  - Total: 23.8 sq mi (61.6 km^{2})
  - Land: 23.8 sq mi (61.6 km^{2})
  - Water: 0 sq mi (0.0 km^{2})
- Elevation: 1,089 ft (332 m)

Population (2020)
  - Total: 378
  - Density: 15.9/sq mi (6.14/km^{2})
- Time zone: UTC-5 (Eastern (EST))
  - Summer (DST): UTC-4 (EDT)
- FIPS code: 39-28357
- GNIS feature ID: 1086650

Franklin Township is one of the eighteen townships of Monroe County, Ohio, United States. As of the 2020 census, the population was 378, including 71 people in the village of Stafford.

== Geography ==
Located in the western part of the county, it borders the following townships:

- Seneca Township - north
- Summit Township - northeast
- Wayne Township - east
- Washington Township - southeast
- Bethel Township - south
- Elk Township, Noble County - southwest
- Stock Township, Noble County - west
- Marion Township, Noble County - northwest corner

The village of Stafford lies in southwestern Franklin Township.

== Name and history ==
It is one of twenty-one Franklin Townships statewide.

== Government ==
The township is governed by a three-member board of trustees, who are elected in November of odd-numbered years to a four-year term beginning on the following January 1. Two are elected in the year after the presidential election and one is elected in the year before it. There is also an elected township fiscal officer, who serves a four-year term beginning on April 1 of the year after the election, which is held in November of the year before the presidential election. Vacancies in the fiscal officership or on the board of trustees are filled by the remaining trustees.
