= Stafford, Ohio =

- Village
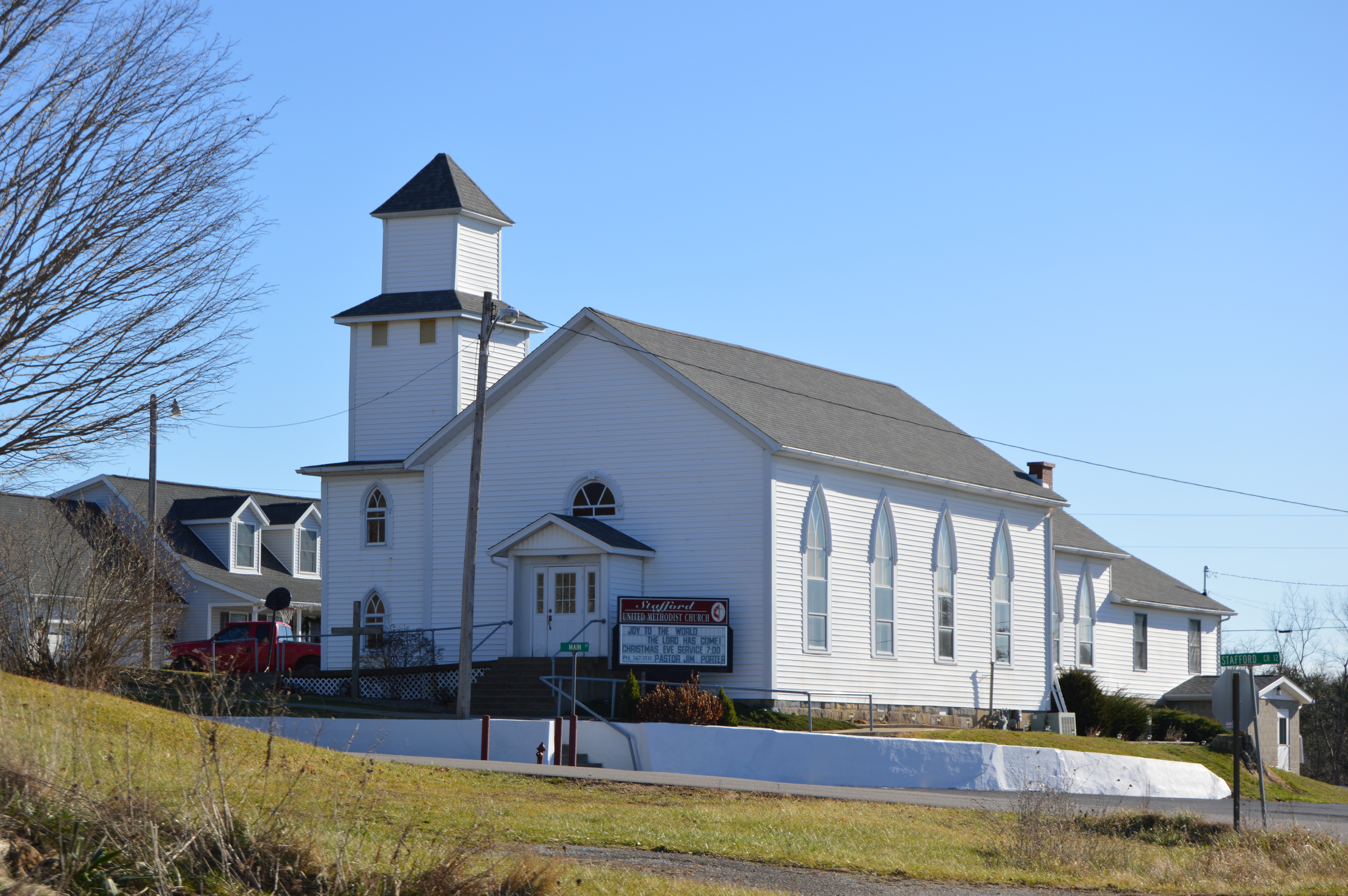
- Methodist church, State Route 145 and Main Street

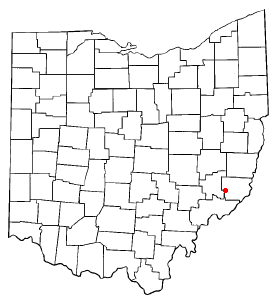
- Location of Stafford, Ohio

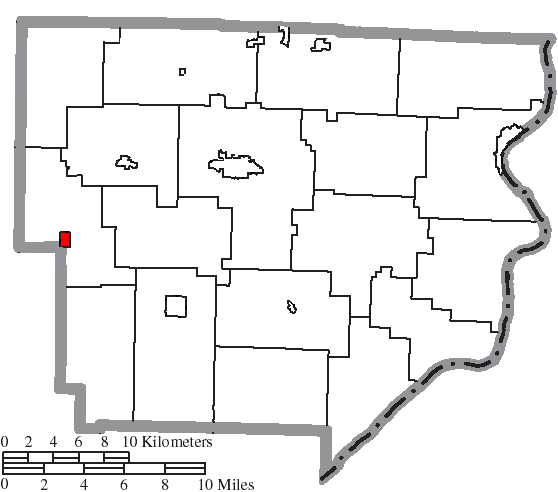
- Location of Stafford in Monroe County
- Coordinates: 39°42′45″N 81°16′36″W
- Country: United States
- State: Ohio
- County: Monroe
- Township: Franklin

Area
  - Total: 0.34 sq mi (0.88 km^{2})
  - Land: 0.34 sq mi (0.88 km^{2})
  - Water: 0 sq mi (0.00 km^{2})
- Elevation: 1,063 ft (324 m)

Population (2020)
  - Total: 71
  - Density: 208.9/sq mi (80.67/km^{2})
- Time zone: UTC-5 (Eastern (EST))
  - Summer (DST): UTC-4 (EDT)
- ZIP code: 43786
- Area code: 740
- FIPS code: 39-74300
- GNIS feature ID: 2399882

Stafford is a village in Monroe County, Ohio, United States. The population was 71 at the 2020 census.

== History ==
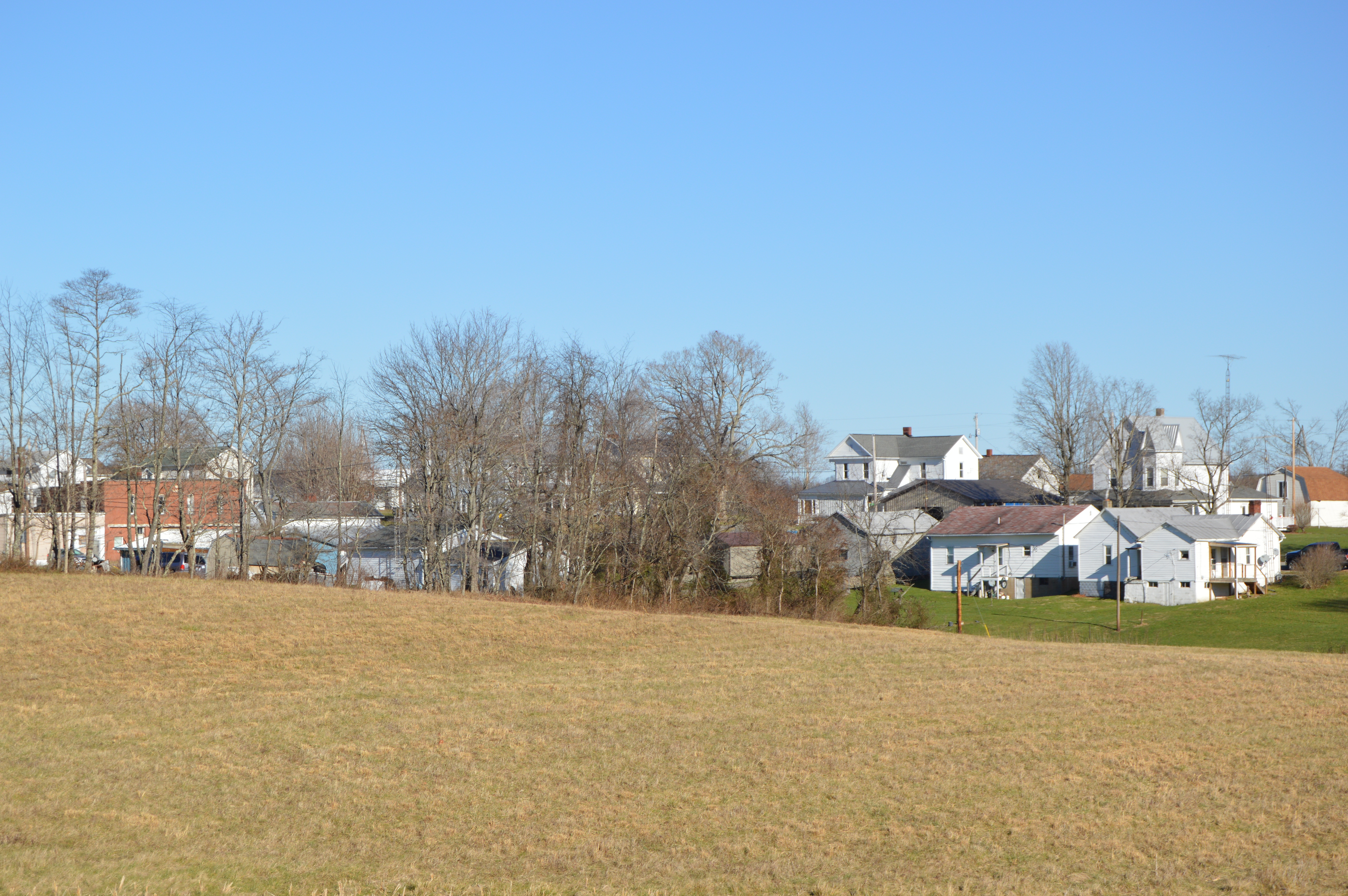
Overview from State Route 145

Originally named Bethel, the town was laid out by John Jones in 1838. William Steel, a Scottish-born abolitionist, is credited with changing the name of the village from Bethel to Stafford. He was the father of William Gladstone Steel. He is credited with establishing a good educational system that was also integrated.

Stafford has a rich history as a station on the Underground Railroad. It was known as a "free black" settlement because of the number of African Americans living there, but its population included both black and white ardent abolitionists. It is said that almost everyone in the village was involved in the protection of slaves fleeing to freedom. The most frequented route ran from Marietta in Washington County, Ohio, through Stafford and on to Summerfield, Ohio. These lines continued into Ontario, Canada.

== Geography ==
According to the United States Census Bureau, the village has a total area of 0.34 square miles (0.88 km^{2}), all of it land.

== Demographics ==
Historical population
Census	Pop.	Note	%±
1850	124		—
1860	197		58.9%
1870	150		−23.9%
1880	172		14.7%
1910	174		—
1920	158		−9.2%
1930	145		−8.2%
1940	163		12.4%
1950	141		−13.5%
1960	113		−19.9%
1970	120		6.2%
1980	98		−18.3%
1990	89		−9.2%
2000	86		−3.4%
2010	81		−5.8%
2020	71		−12.3%
U.S. Decennial Census

=== 2010 census ===
As of the census of 2010, there were 81 people, 34 households, and 25 families residing in the village. The population density was 238.2 inhabitants per square mile (92.0/km^{2}). There were 41 housing units at an average density of 120.6 per square mile (46.6/km^{2}). The racial makeup of the village was 93.8% White, 4.9% African American, and 1.2% Native American.

There were 34 households, of which 20.6% had children under the age of 18 living with them, 64.7% were married couples living together, 5.9% had a female householder with no husband present, 2.9% had a male householder with no wife present, and 26.5% were non-families. 23.5% of all households were made up of individuals, and 11.7% had someone living alone who was 65 years of age or older. The average household size was 2.32 and the average family size was 2.52.

The median age in the village was 47.2 years. 18.5% of residents were under the age of 18; 6.1% were between the ages of 18 and 24; 18.5% were from 25 to 44; 37% were from 45 to 64; and 19.8% were 65 years of age or older. The gender makeup of the village was 48.1% male and 51.9% female.

=== 2000 census ===
As of the census of 2000, there were 86 people, 38 households, and 25 families residing in the village. The population density was 254.3 inhabitants per square mile (98.2/km^{2}). There were 42 housing units at an average density of 124.2 per square mile (48.0/km^{2}). The racial makeup of the village was 98.84% White and 1.16% Native American.

There were 38 households, out of which 39.5% had children under the age of 18 living with them, 52.6% were married couples living together, 13.2% had a female householder with no husband present, and 31.6% were non-families. 28.9% of all households were made up of individuals, and 15.8% had someone living alone who was 65 years of age or older. The average household size was 2.26 and the average family size was 2.77.

In the village, the population was spread out, with 26.7% under the age of 18, 3.5% from 18 to 24, 24.4% from 25 to 44, 30.2% from 45 to 64, and 15.1% who were 65 years of age or older. The median age was 42 years. For every 100 females there were 95.5 males. For every 100 females age 18 and over, there were 85.3 males.

The median income for a household in the village was $24,167, and the median income for a family was $22,917. Males had a median income of $24,063 versus $16,250 for females. The per capita income for the village was $12,747. There were 10.0% of families and 11.4% of the population living below the poverty line, including 6.3% of under eighteens and 18.8% of those over 64.

== Notable people ==
Stafford was the hometown of AIDS activist David Kirby whose life and death were featured in Life Magazine in the 1990s.
