= Jefferson Township, Noble County, Ohio =

Township in Ohio, US

- Township
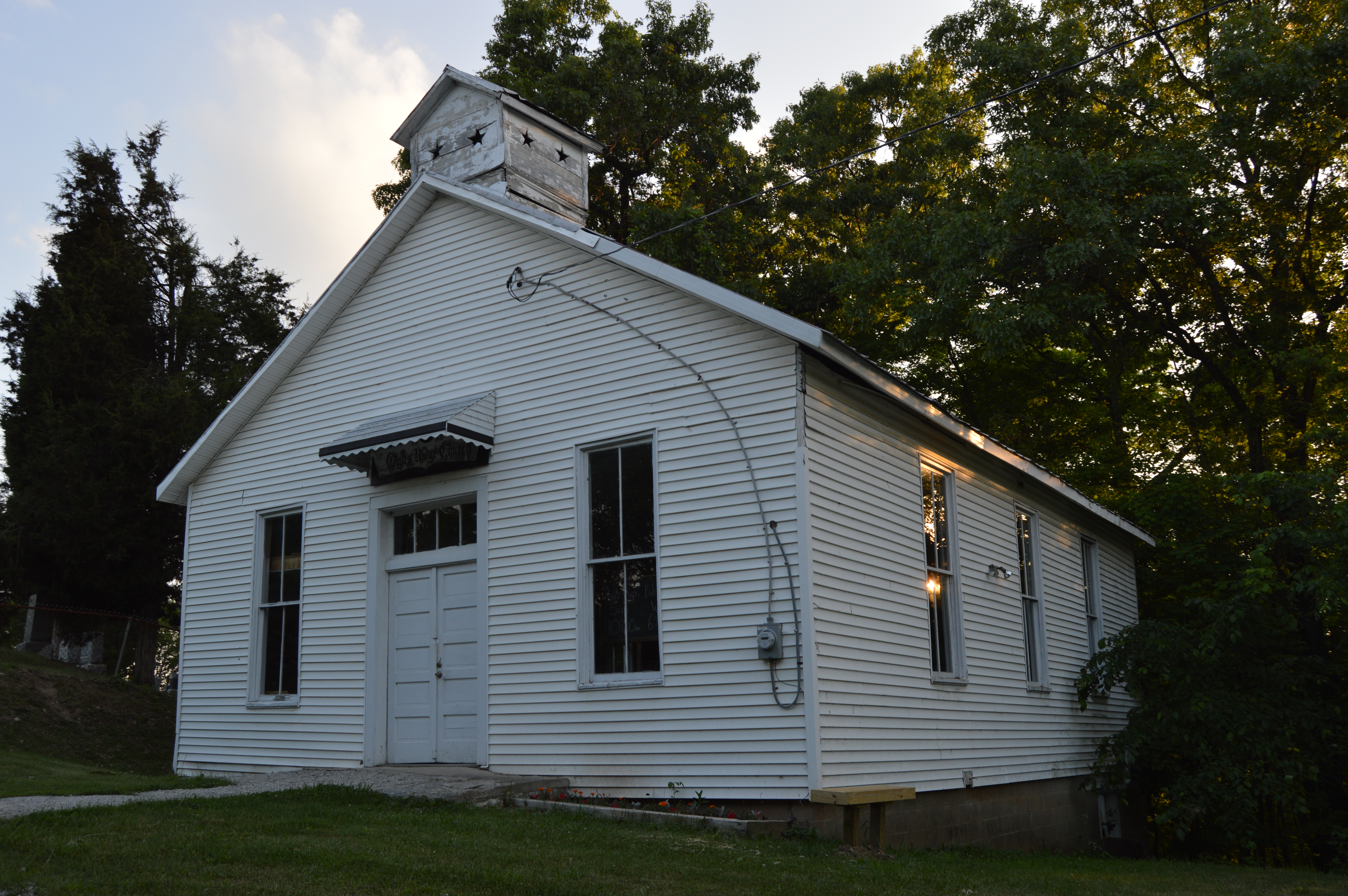
- Ogles Ridge Church, south of Middleburg

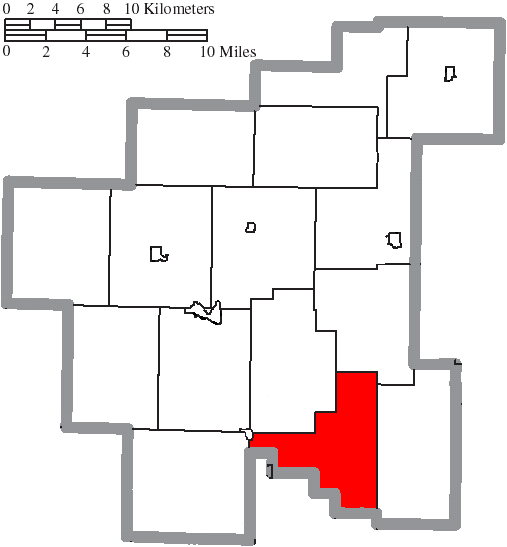
- Location of Jefferson Township in Noble County
- Coordinates: 39°39′33″N 81°25′0″W
- Country: United States
- State: Ohio
- County: Noble

Area
  - Total: 23.7 sq mi (61.5 km^{2})
  - Land: 23.7 sq mi (61.5 km^{2})
  - Water: 0 sq mi (0.0 km^{2})
- Elevation: 1,024 ft (312 m)

Population (2020)
  - Total: 187
  - Density: 7.88/sq mi (3.04/km^{2})
- Time zone: UTC-5 (Eastern (EST))
  - Summer (DST): UTC-4 (EDT)
- FIPS code: 39-38766
- GNIS feature ID: 1086746

Jefferson Township is one of the fifteen townships of Noble County, Ohio, United States. The 2020 census found 187 people in the township.

== Geography ==
Located in the southern part of the county, it borders the following townships:

- Enoch Township - north
- Stock Township - northeast
- Elk Township - east
- Salem Township, Washington County - south
- Aurelius Township, Washington Township - southwest
- Jackson Township - west
- Olive Township - northwest corner

A part of the small village of Dexter City is located in far western Jefferson Township.

== Name and history ==
It is one of twenty-four Jefferson Townships statewide.

== Government ==
The township is governed by a three-member board of trustees, who are elected in November of odd-numbered years to a four-year term beginning on the following January 1. Two are elected in the year after the presidential election and one is elected in the year before it. There is also an elected township fiscal officer, who serves a four-year term beginning on April 1 of the year after the election, which is held in November of the year before the presidential election. Vacancies in the fiscal officership or on the board of trustees are filled by the remaining trustees.
