= Jerusalem, Ohio =

- Village
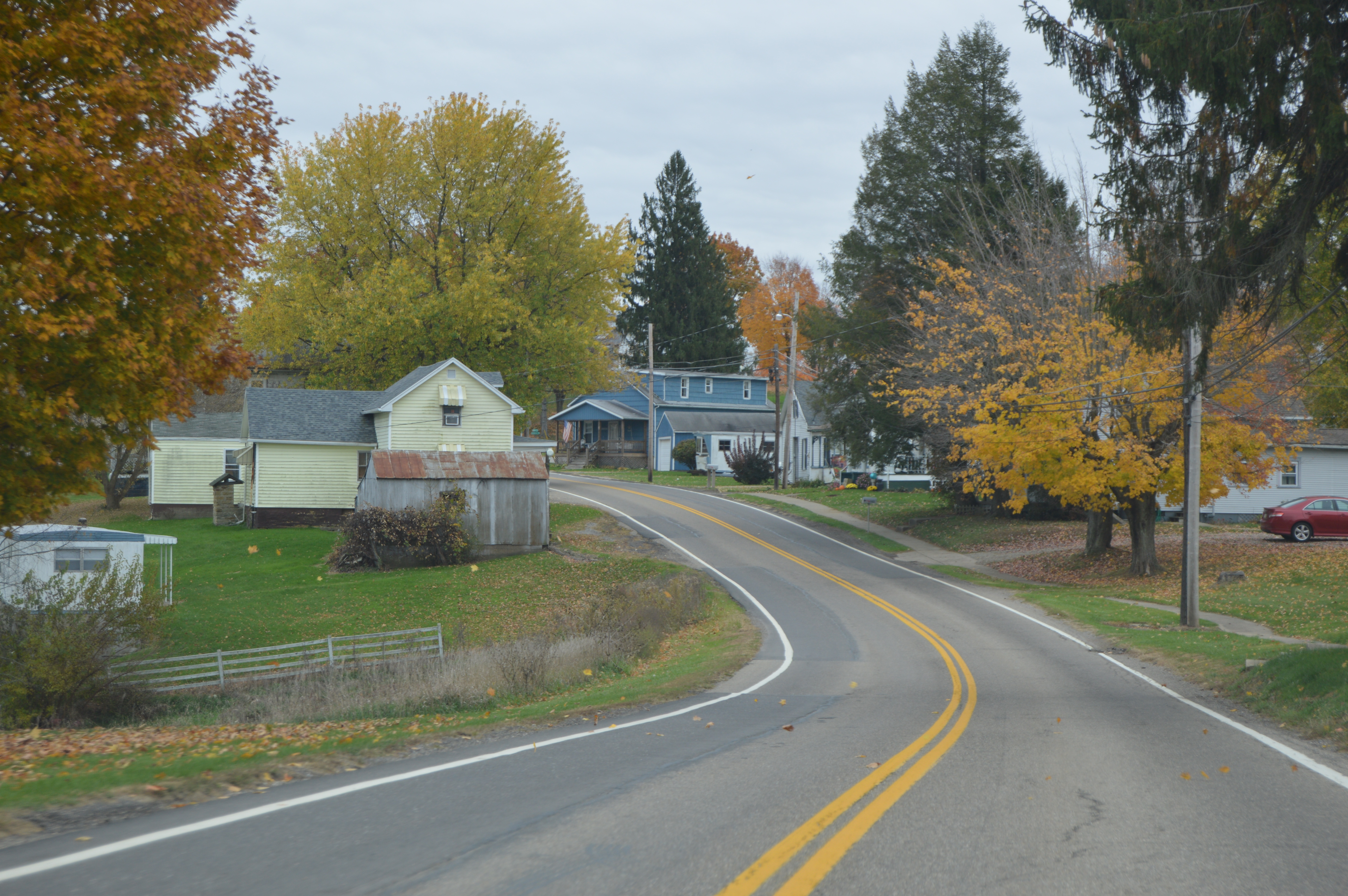
- Main Street

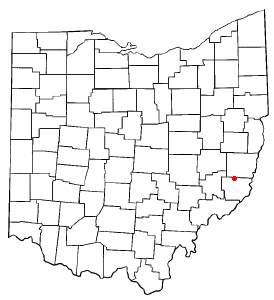
- Location of Jerusalem, Ohio

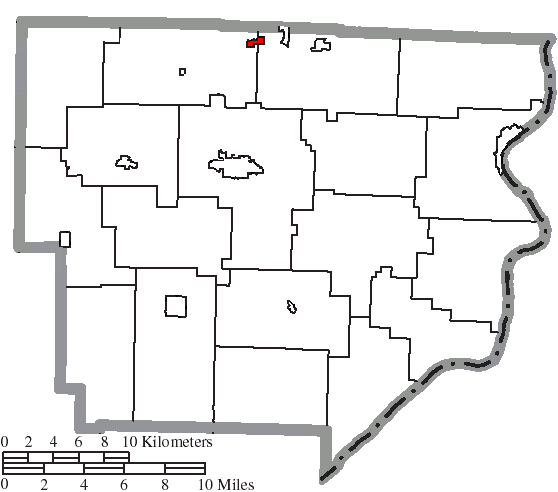
- Location of Jerusalem in Monroe County
- Coordinates: 39°51′07″N 81°05′48″W
- Country: United States
- State: Ohio
- County: Monroe

Area
  - Total: 0.24 sq mi (0.63 km^{2})
  - Land: 0.24 sq mi (0.63 km^{2})
  - Water: 0 sq mi (0.00 km^{2})
- Elevation: 1,263 ft (385 m)

Population (2020)
  - Total: 121
  - Density: 501.0/sq mi (193.43/km^{2})
- Time zone: UTC-5 (Eastern (EST))
  - Summer (DST): UTC-4 (EDT)
- ZIP code: 43747
- Area code: 740
- FIPS code: 39-39130
- GNIS feature ID: 2398301

Jerusalem is a village in Monroe County, Ohio, United States. The population was 121 at the 2020 census.

== Geography ==
According to the United States Census Bureau, the village has a total area of 0.24 square miles (0.62 km^{2}), all of it land.

== Demographics ==
Historical population
Census	Pop.	Note	%±
1870	91		—
1880	135		48.4%
1890	112		−17.0%
1900	245		118.8%
1910	242		−1.2%
1920	241		−0.4%
1930	168		−30.3%
1940	186		10.7%
1950	175		−5.9%
1960	317		81.1%
1970	205		−35.3%
1980	237		15.6%
1990	144		−39.2%
2000	152		5.6%
2010	161		5.9%
2020	121		−24.8%
U.S. Decennial Census

=== 2020 census ===
As of the census of 2020, there were 121 people living in Jerusalem. This is a 24.8% decline since the 2010 census.

By race or ethnicity, 99.2% were White, 0.8% were Pacific Islanders, and none were Hispanic or Latino. The median age was 52.4 years, 14.9% of people were under 18, and 31.4% were over 65.

The 121 people made up 58 households. The average household size was 2.1 people. Of the households, 30 (51.7%) had a married couple, 4 (6.9%) had an unmarried couple, 15 (25.9%) had a female householder without a partner, 9 (15.5%) had a male householder without a partner, 17 (14.0%) had one person living alone, and 20.7% had children under 18 years old.

=== 2010 census ===
As of the census of 2010, there were 161 people, 70 households, and 46 families living in the village. The population density was 670.8 inhabitants per square mile (259.0/km^{2}). There were 76 housing units at an average density of 316.7 per square mile (122.3/km^{2}). The racial makeup of the village was 100.0% White. Hispanic or Latino of any race were 1.2% of the population.

There were 70 households, of which 25.7% had children under the age of 18 living with them, 40.0% were married couples living together, 22.9% had a female householder with no husband present, 2.9% had a male householder with no wife present, and 34.3% were non-families. 28.6% of all households were made up of individuals, and 10% had someone living alone who was 65 years of age or older. The average household size was 2.30 and the average family size was 2.63.

The median age in the village was 43.8 years. 21.7% of residents were under the age of 18; 9.5% were between the ages of 18 and 24; 22.9% were from 25 to 44; 23% were from 45 to 64; and 23% were 65 years of age or older. The gender makeup of the village was 51.6% male and 48.4% female.

=== 2000 census ===
As of the census of 2000, there were 152 people, 69 households, and 48 families living in the village. The population density was 605.6 inhabitants per square mile (233.8/km^{2}). There were 74 housing units at an average density of 294.8 per square mile (113.8/km^{2}). The racial makeup of the village was 100.00% White.

There were 69 households, out of which 23.2% had children under the age of 18 living with them, 55.1% were married couples living together, 13.0% had a female householder with no husband present, and 30.4% were non-families. 27.5% of all households were made up of individuals, and 17.4% had someone living alone who was 65 years of age or older. The average household size was 2.20 and the average family size was 2.67.

In the village, the population was spread out, with 17.8% under the age of 18, 5.3% from 18 to 24, 28.9% from 25 to 44, 27.0% from 45 to 64, and 21.1% who were 65 years of age or older. The median age was 44 years. For every 100 females there were 87.7 males. For every 100 females age 18 and over, there were 81.2 males.

The median income for a household in the village was $28,000, and the median income for a family was $33,611. Males had a median income of $22,917 versus $16,250 for females. The per capita income for the village was $12,873. About 9.6% of families and 13.5% of the population were below the poverty line, including 25.6% of those under the age of eighteen and 5.1% of those 65 or over.

== Education ==
Jerusalem is served by the Monroe County District Library from its administrative offices in Woodsfield, Ohio.
