= Bethel Township, Monroe County, Ohio =

Township in Ohio, US

- Township
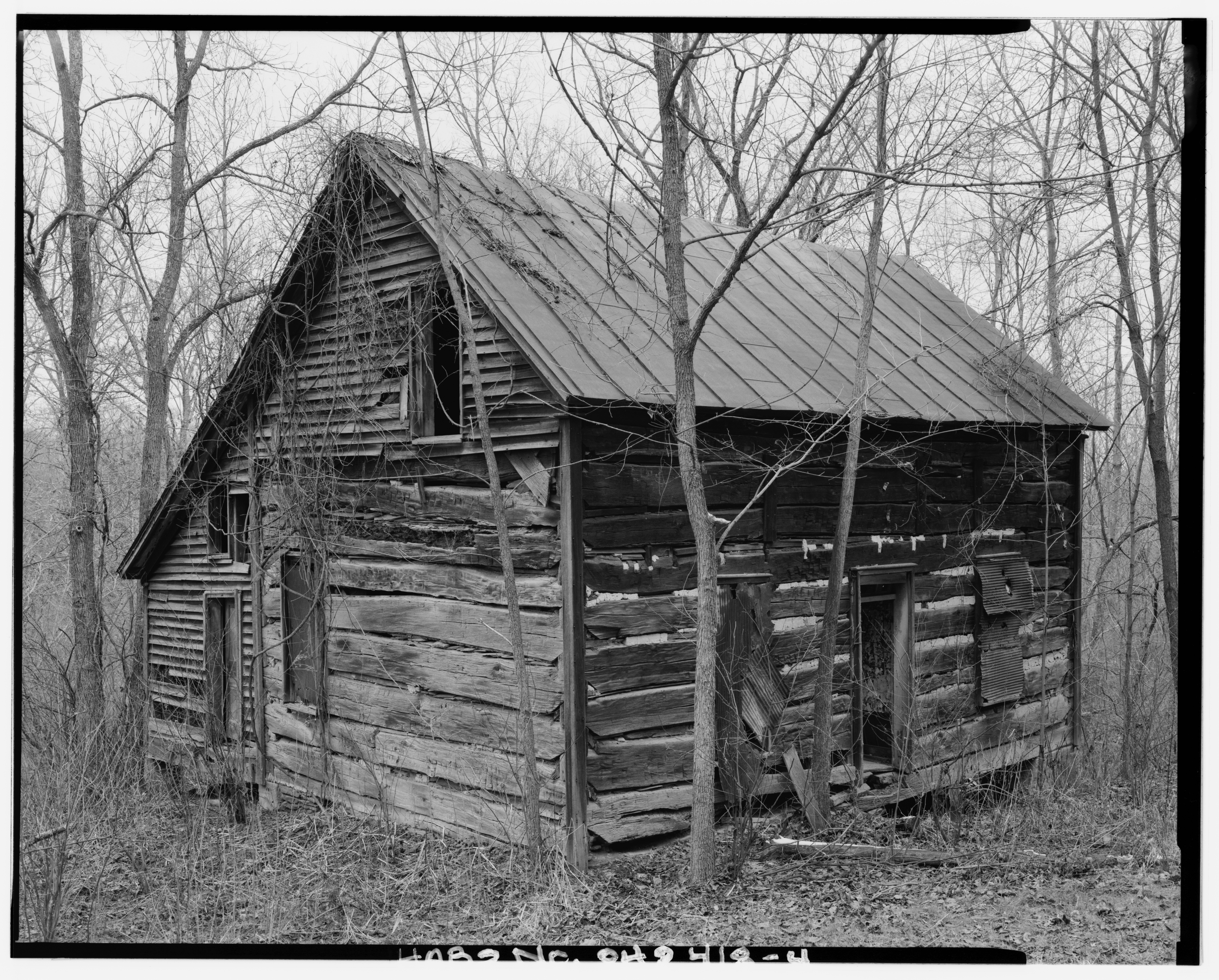
- 1850s William McFadden Log House, near Sycamore Valley

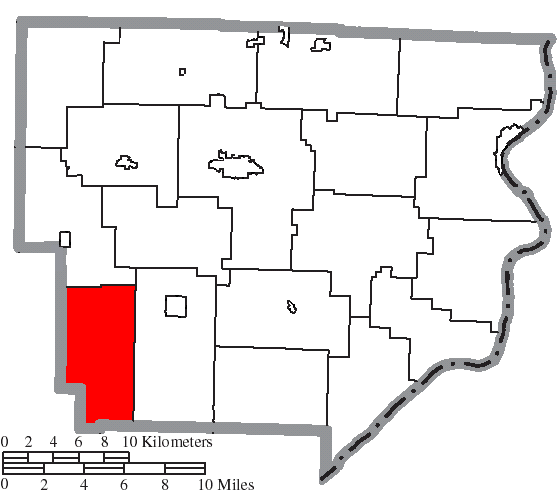
- Location of Bethel Township in Monroe County
- Coordinates: 39°37′40″N 81°14′55″W
- Country: United States
- State: Ohio
- County: Monroe

Area
  - Total: 23.5 sq mi (60.9 km^{2})
  - Land: 23.5 sq mi (60.9 km^{2})
  - Water: 0 sq mi (0.0 km^{2})
- Elevation: 912 ft (278 m)

Population (2020)
  - Total: 271
  - Density: 11.5/sq mi (4.45/km^{2})
- Time zone: UTC-5 (Eastern (EST))
  - Summer (DST): UTC-4 (EDT)
- FIPS code: 39-06124
- GNIS feature ID: 1086648

Bethel Township is one of the eighteen townships of Monroe County, Ohio, United States. As of the 2020 census, the population was 271.

== Geography ==
Located in the southwestern corner of the county, it borders the following townships:

- Franklin Township - north
- Washington Township - east
- Ludlow Township, Washington County - southeast
- Liberty Township, Washington County - southwest
- Elk Township, Noble County - west

No municipalities are located in Bethel Township, although the unincorporated community of Sycamore Valley lies in the township's north.

== Name and history ==
Statewide, other Bethel Townships are located in Clark and Miami counties.

== Government ==
The township is governed by a three-member board of trustees, who are elected in November of odd-numbered years to a four-year term beginning on the following January 1. Two are elected in the year after the presidential election and one is elected in the year before it. There is also an elected township fiscal officer, who serves a four-year term beginning on April 1 of the year after the election, which is held in November of the year before the presidential election. Vacancies in the fiscal officership or on the board of trustees are filled by the remaining trustees.
