= Stock Township, Noble County, Ohio =

Township in Ohio, US

- Township
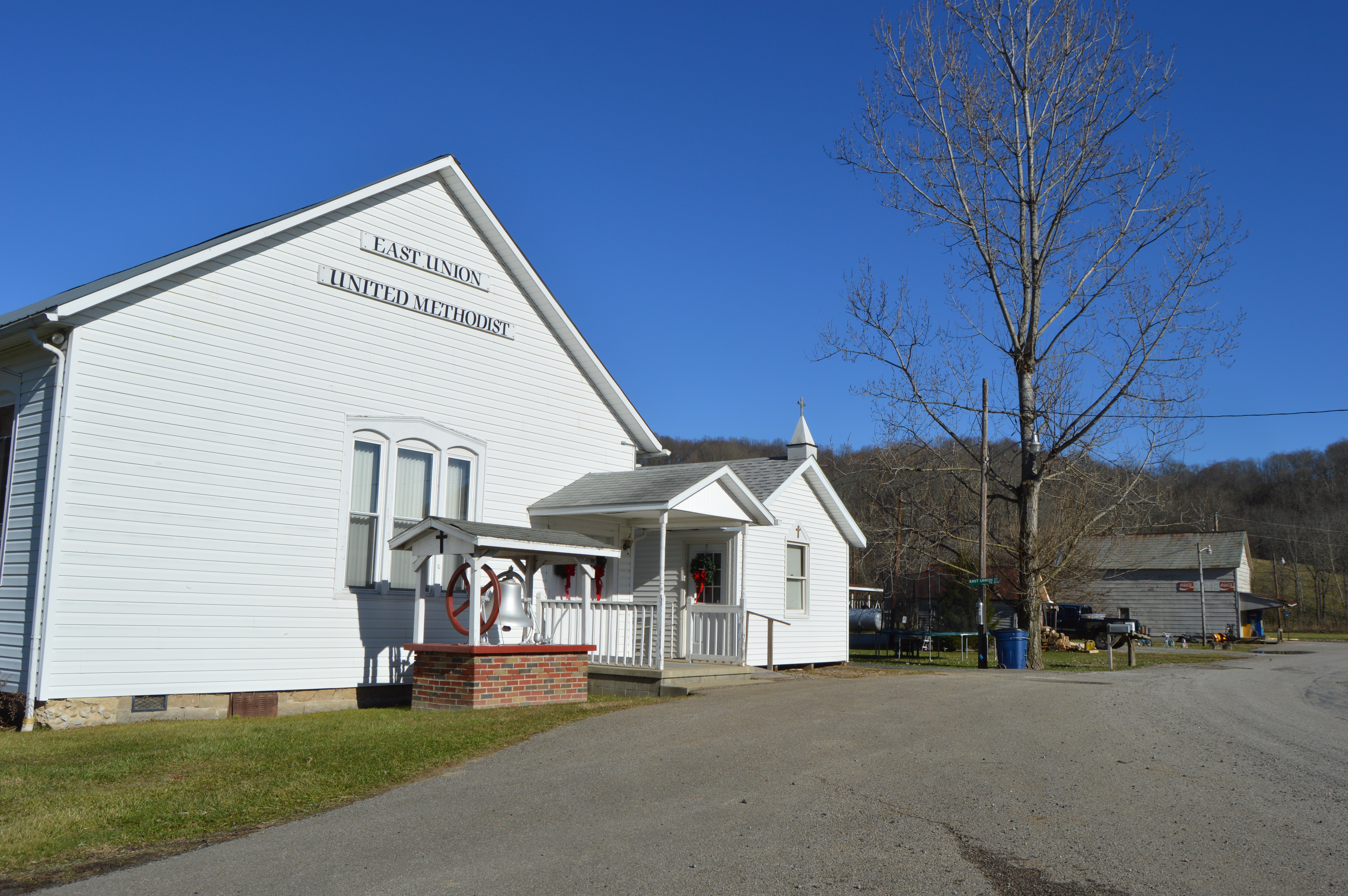
- Doshie Road in East Union

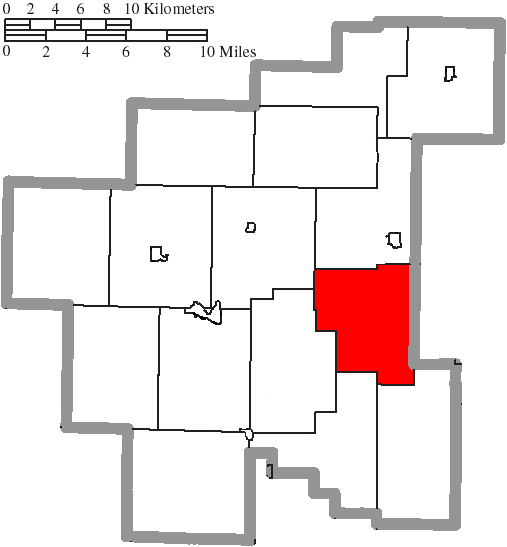
- Location of Stock Township in Noble County
- Coordinates: 39°44′43″N 81°21′58″W
- Country: United States
- State: Ohio
- County: Noble

Area
  - Total: 24.6 sq mi (63.8 km^{2})
  - Land: 24.6 sq mi (63.8 km^{2})
  - Water: 0 sq mi (0.0 km^{2})
- Elevation: 1,001 ft (305 m)

Population (2020)
  - Total: 312
  - Density: 12.7/sq mi (4.89/km^{2})
- Time zone: UTC-5 (Eastern (EST))
  - Summer (DST): UTC-4 (EDT)
- FIPS code: 39-74728
- GNIS feature ID: 1086752

Stock Township is one of the fifteen townships of Noble County, Ohio, United States. The 2020 census found 312 people in the township.

== Geography ==
Located in the eastern part of the county, it borders the following townships:

- Marion Township - north
- Seneca Township, Monroe County - northeast corner
- Franklin Township, Monroe County - east
- Elk Township - southeast
- Jefferson Township - southwest
- Enoch Township - west
- Center Township - northwest

No municipalities are located in Stock Township, although the unincorporated community of East Union lies in the township's northwest.

== Name and history ==
Statewide, the only other Stock Township is located in Harrison County.

== Government ==
The township is governed by a three-member board of trustees, who are elected in November of odd-numbered years to a four-year term beginning on the following January 1. Two are elected in the year after the presidential election and one is elected in the year before it. There is also an elected township fiscal officer, who serves a four-year term beginning on April 1 of the year after the election, which is held in November of the year before the presidential election. Vacancies in the fiscal officership or on the board of trustees are filled by the remaining trustees.
