= Lewisville, Ohio =

- Village
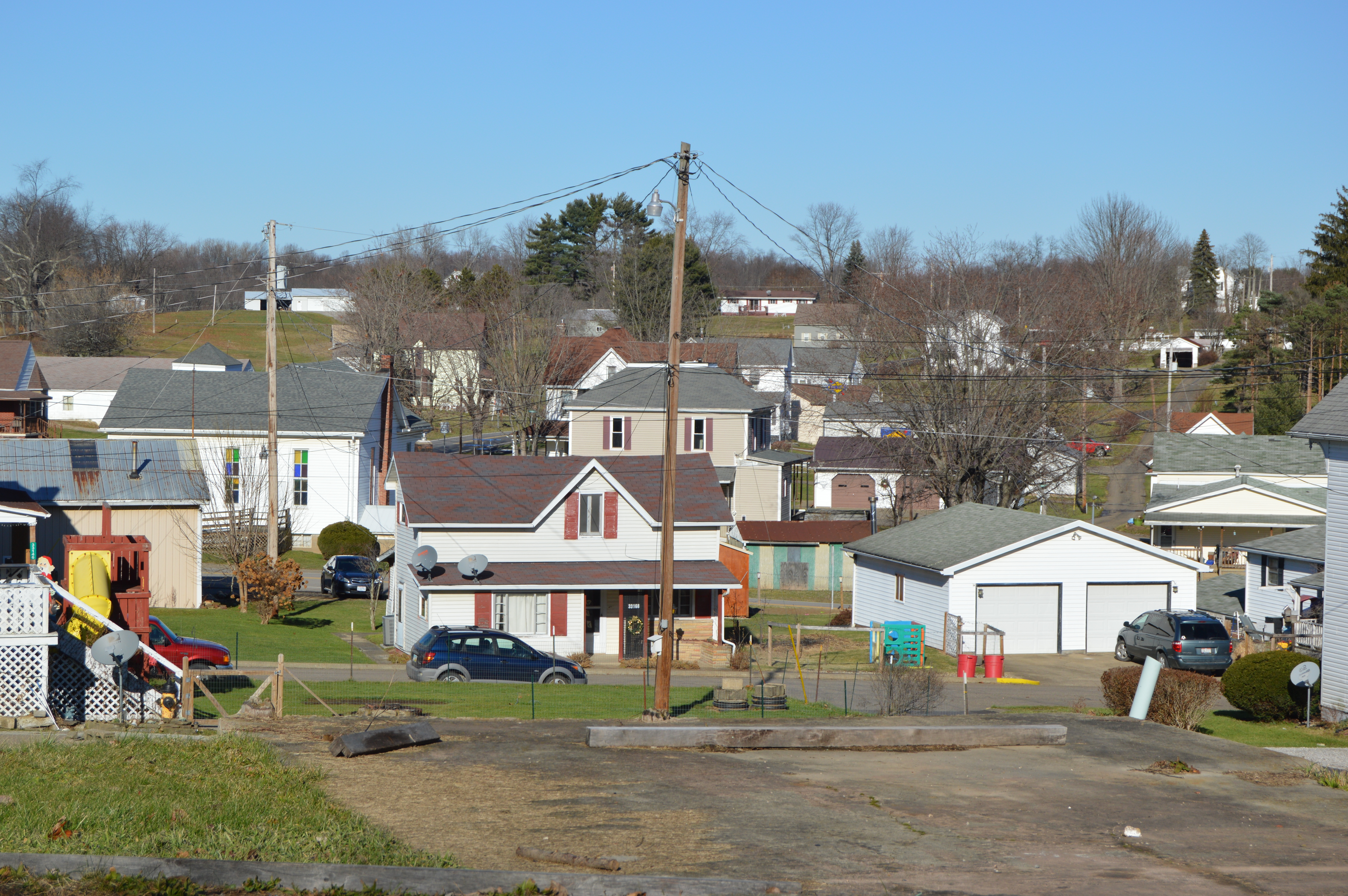
- Overview from Back Street

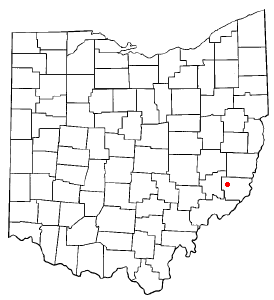
- Location in Ohio

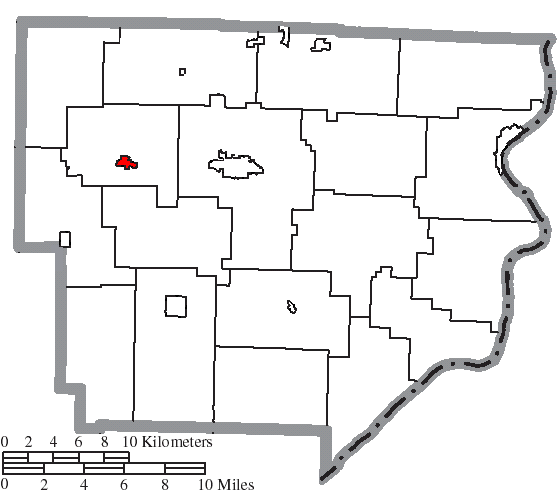
- Location in Monroe County
- Coordinates: 39°46′01″N 81°13′06″W
- Country: United States
- State: Ohio
- County: Monroe
- Township: Summit

Area
  - Total: 0.37 sq mi (0.96 km^{2})
  - Land: 0.37 sq mi (0.96 km^{2})
  - Water: 0 sq mi (0.00 km^{2})
- Elevation: 1,224 ft (373 m)

Population (2020)
  - Total: 184
  - Density: 496/sq mi (192/km^{2})
- Time zone: UTC-5 (Eastern (EST))
  - Summer (DST): UTC-4 (EDT)
- ZIP Code: 43754
- Area code: 740
- FIPS code: 39-42980
- GNIS feature ID: 2398430

Lewisville is a village in Monroe County, Ohio, United States. As of the 2020 census, it had a population of 184.

== Geography ==
Lewisville is in northwestern Monroe County, in the south-central part of Summit Township. Ohio State Route 78 passes through the village just north of its center, leading east 7 miles (11 km) to Woodsfield, the county seat, and northwest 10 miles (16 km) to Summerfield. State Route 145 passes through the center of Lewisville, leading northeast 7 miles (11 km) to Miltonsburg and southwest 8 miles (13 km) to Stafford.

According to the U.S. Census Bureau, Lewisville has a total area of 0.37 square miles (0.96 km^{2}), all land. The village sits in a saddle that is the headwaters of Sunfish Creek, which flows east to the Ohio River at Clarington; and of South Fork, which flows northwest to the Seneca Fork of Wills Creek, a tributary of the Muskingum River.

== Demographics ==
Historical population
Census	Pop.	Note	%±
1850	96		—
1870	124		—
1880	120		−3.2%
1900	170		—
1910	291		71.2%
1920	230		−21.0%
1930	231		0.4%
1940	252		9.1%
1950	217		−13.9%
1960	193		−11.1%
1970	294		52.3%
1980	285		−3.1%
1990	261		−8.4%
2000	233		−10.7%
2010	176		−24.5%
2020	184		4.5%
U.S. Decennial Census

=== 2010 census ===
As of the census of 2010, there were 176 people, 76 households, and 48 families living in the village. The population density was 475.7 inhabitants per square mile (183.7/km^{2}). There were 97 housing units at an average density of 262.2 per square mile (101.2/km^{2}). The racial makeup of the village was 98.3% White, 0.6% Asian, and 1.1% from two or more races. Hispanic or Latino of any race were 0.6% of the population.

There were 76 households, of which 25.0% had children under the age of 18 living with them, 50.0% were married couples living together, 6.6% had a female householder with no husband present, 6.6% had a male householder with no wife present, and 36.8% were non-families. 31.6% of all households were made up of individuals, and 14.5% had someone living alone who was 65 years of age or older. The average household size was 2.11 and the average family size was 2.67.

The median age in the village was 48.5 years. 17% of residents were under the age of 18; 6.2% were between the ages of 18 and 24; 23.3% were from 25 to 44; 33% were from 45 to 64; and 20.5% were 65 years of age or older. The gender makeup of the village was 46.6% male and 53.4% female.

=== 2000 census ===
As of the census of 2000, there were 233 people, 95 households, and 64 families living in the village. The population density was 625.4 inhabitants per square mile (241.5/km^{2}). There were 110 housing units at an average density of 295.2 per square mile (114.0/km^{2}). The racial makeup of the village was 99.14% White, 0.43% Asian, and 0.43% from two or more races.

There were 95 households, out of which 28.4% had children under the age of 18 living with them, 57.9% were married couples living together, 9.5% had a female householder with no husband present, and 31.6% were non-families. 30.5% of all households were made up of individuals, and 21.1% had someone living alone who was 65 years of age or older. The average household size was 2.32 and the average family size was 2.91.

In the village, the population was spread out, with 23.6% under the age of 18, 6.4% from 18 to 24, 24.5% from 25 to 44, 24.9% from 45 to 64, and 20.6% who were 65 years of age or older. The median age was 41 years. For every 100 females there were 77.9 males. For every 100 females age 18 and over, there were 79.8 males.

The median income for a household in the village was $24,286, and the median income for a family was $31,042. Males had a median income of $33,750 versus $18,036 for females. The per capita income for the village was $11,150. About 6.5% of families and 10.1% of the population were below the poverty line, including none of those under the age of eighteen and 19.6% of those 65 or over.
