= Elk Township, Noble County, Ohio =

Township in Ohio, US

- Township
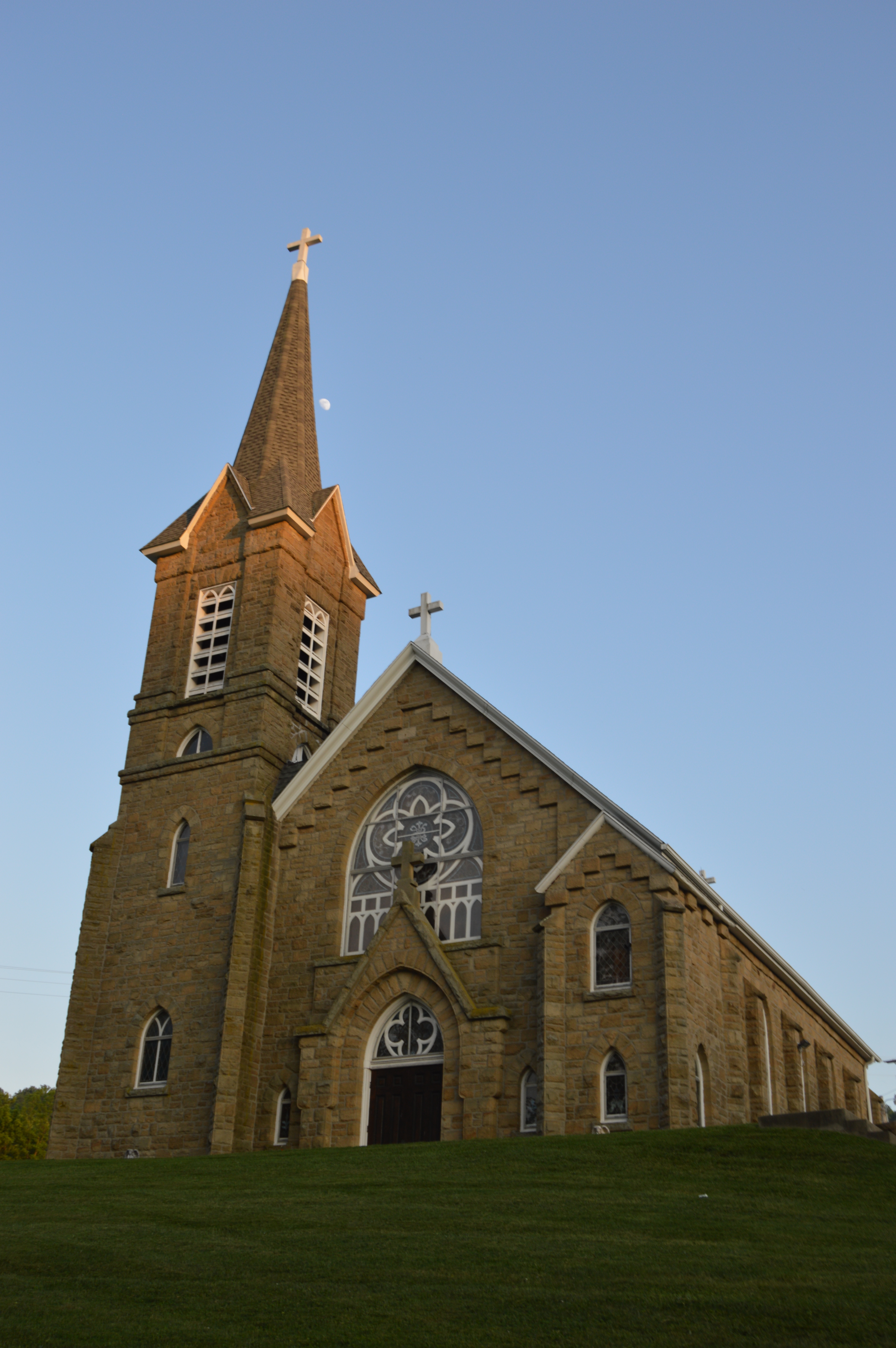
- St. Henry's Catholic Church at Harriettsville

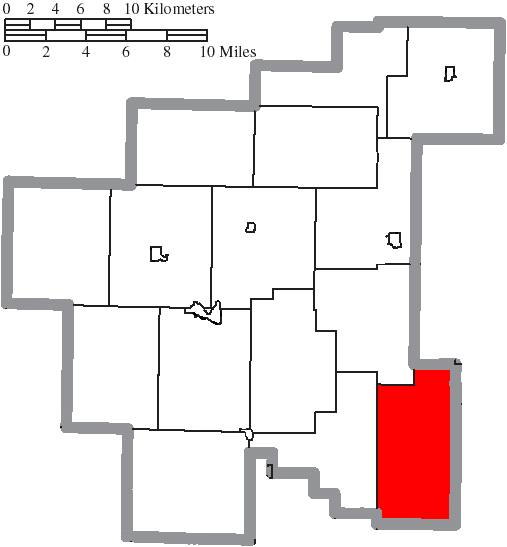
- Location of Elk Township in Noble County
- Coordinates: 39°39′42″N 81°19′1″W
- Country: United States
- State: Ohio
- County: Noble

Area
  - Total: 29.1 sq mi (75.4 km^{2})
  - Land: 29.1 sq mi (75.4 km^{2})
  - Water: 0 sq mi (0.0 km^{2})
- Elevation: 922 ft (281 m)

Population (2020)
  - Total: 303
  - Density: 10.4/sq mi (4.02/km^{2})
- Time zone: UTC-5 (Eastern (EST))
  - Summer (DST): UTC-4 (EDT)
- FIPS code: 39-24878
- GNIS feature ID: 1086743

Elk Township is one of the fifteen townships of Noble County, Ohio, United States. The 2020 census found 303 people in the township.

== Geography ==
Located in the southeastern corner of the county, it borders the following townships:

- Franklin Township, Monroe County - northeast
- Bethel Township, Monroe County - east
- Liberty Township, Washington County - south
- Salem Township, Washington County - southwest
- Jefferson Township - west
- Stock Township - northwest

No municipalities are located in Elk Township.

== Name and history ==
Originally part of Monroe County, Elk Township was transferred to Noble County upon its formation on April 1, 1851. Statewide, the only other Elk Township is located in Vinton County, although there is an Elkrun Township in Columbiana County.

== Government ==
The township is governed by a three-member board of trustees, who are elected in November of odd-numbered years to a four-year term beginning on the following January 1. Two are elected in the year after the presidential election and one is elected in the year before it. There is also an elected township fiscal officer, who serves a four-year term beginning on April 1 of the year after the election, which is held in November of the year before the presidential election. Vacancies in the fiscal officership or on the board of trustees are filled by the remaining trustees.
