= Lower Salem, Ohio =

- Village
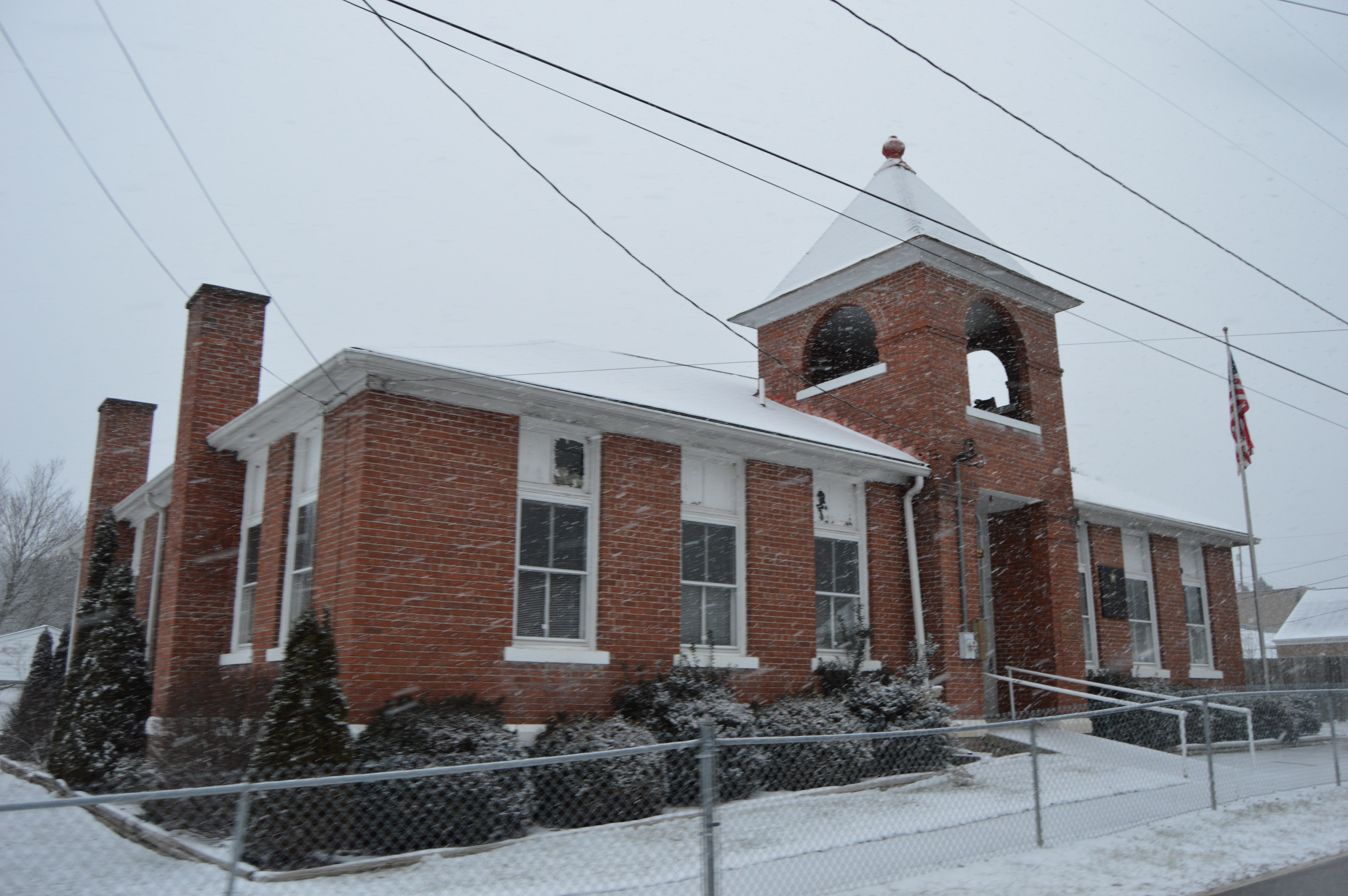
- Village Hall on Main Street

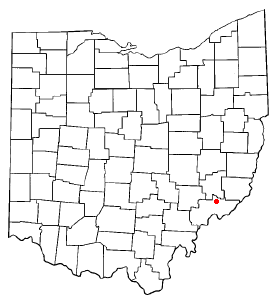
- Location of Lower Salem, Ohio

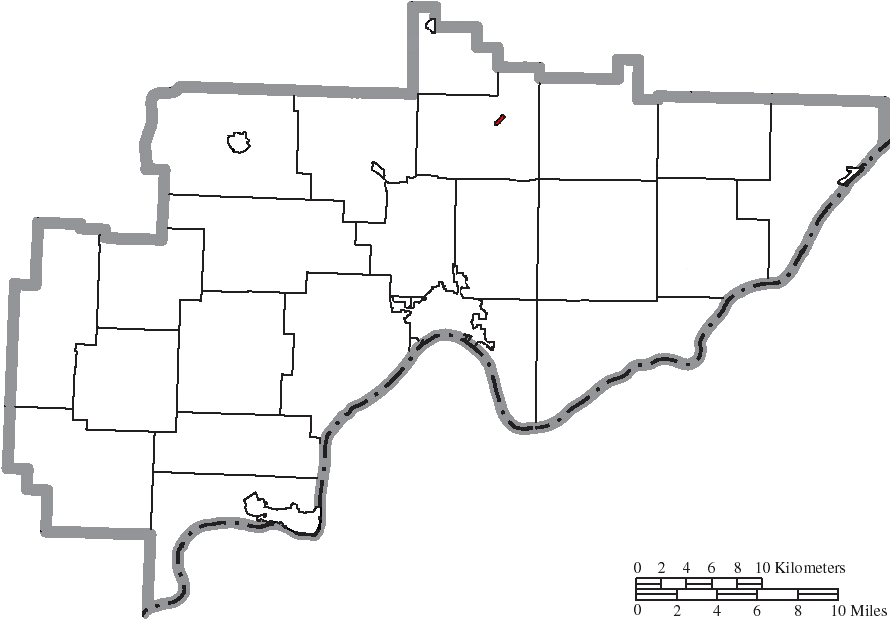
- Location of Lower Salem in Washington County
- Coordinates: 39°33′48″N 81°23′39″W
- Country: United States
- State: Ohio
- County: Washington

Government
  - Mayor: Myra Smith

Area
  - Total: 0.062 sq mi (0.16 km^{2})
  - Land: 0.058 sq mi (0.15 km^{2})
  - Water: 0.0039 sq mi (0.01 km^{2})
- Elevation: 696 ft (212 m)

Population (2020)
  - Total: 75
  - Density: 1,277.5/sq mi (493.25/km^{2})
- Time zone: UTC-5 (Eastern (EST))
  - Summer (DST): UTC-4 (EDT)
- ZIP code: 45745
- Area code: 740
- FIPS code: 39-45220
- GNIS feature ID: 2399196

Lower Salem is a village in Washington County, Ohio, United States. The population was 75 at the 2020 census.

== History ==
Lower Salem had its start when a corduroy road (called the Old Plank Road) was built through it to Marietta. It has a post office. The town site was not laid out until 1850, and was settled predominantly by German immigrants. Lower Salem was once home to a hotel, a doctor's office, an armory, Wagner's General Store, and a gas station and auto parts shop. While all of these buildings remain standing, all have gone out of business.

== Geography ==
According to the United States Census Bureau, the village has a total area of 0.06 square miles (0.16 km^{2}), all land.

== Demographics ==
Historical population
Census	Pop.	Note	%±
1870	187		—
1880	198		5.9%
1900	190		—
1910	187		−1.6%
1920	138		−26.2%
1930	135		−2.2%
1940	135		0.0%
1950	126		−6.7%
1960	143		13.5%
1970	106		−25.9%
1980	110		3.8%
1990	103		−6.4%
2000	109		5.8%
2010	86		−21.1%
2020	75		−12.8%
U.S. Decennial Census

=== 2010 census ===
As of the census of 2010, there were 86 people, 31 households, and 21 families residing in the village. The population density was 1,433.3 inhabitants per square mile (553.4/km^{2}). There were 39 housing units at an average density of 650.0 per square mile (251.0/km^{2}). The racial makeup of the village was 93.0% White and 7.0% African American. Hispanic or Latino of any race were 1.2% of the population.

There were 31 households, of which 35.5% had children under the age of 18 living with them, 41.9% were married couples living together, 16.1% had a female householder with no husband present, 9.7% had a male householder with no wife present, and 32.3% were non-families. 19.4% of all households were made up of individuals, and 3.2% had someone living alone who was 65 years of age or older. The average household size was 2.77 and the average family size was 3.19.

The median age in the village was 41 years. 23.3% of residents were under the age of 18; 5.8% were between the ages of 18 and 24; 28% were from 25 to 44; 29.1% were from 45 to 64; and 14% were 65 years of age or older. The gender makeup of the village was 44.2% male and 55.8% female.

=== 2000 census ===
As of the census of 2000, there were 109 people, 36 households, and 27 families residing in the village. The population density was 1,373.2 inhabitants per square mile (530.2/km^{2}). There were 38 housing units at an average density of 478.7 per square mile (184.8/km^{2}). The racial makeup of the village was 93.58% White, 0.92% African American, and 5.50% from two or more races.

There were 36 households, out of which 47.2% had children under the age of 18 living with them, 44.4% were married couples living together, 22.2% had a female householder with no husband present, and 25.0% were non-families. 19.4% of all households were made up of individuals, and 8.3% had someone living alone who was 65 years of age or older. The average household size was 3.03 and the average family size was 3.52.

In the village, the population was spread out, with 33.0% under the age of 18, 10.1% from 18 to 24, 31.2% from 25 to 44, 18.3% from 45 to 64, and 7.3% who were 65 years of age or older. The median age was 30 years. For every 100 females there were 73.0 males. For every 100 females age 18 and over, there were 73.8 males.

The median income for a household in the village was $36,875, and the median income for a family was $36,875. Males had a median income of $26,875 versus $16,875 for females. The per capita income for the village was $10,209. There were 7.4% of families and 5.0% of the population living below the poverty line, including 3.7% of under eighteens and 10.5% of those over 64.

== Education ==
Salem-Liberty Elementary School sits north of State Route 821 opposite the East Fork of Duck Creek west of the town's corporation limit and serves as the elementary school for about 80 students of the Fort Frye Local School District.
