= List of bridges documented by the Historic American Engineering Record in Ohio =

This is a list of bridges documented by the Historic American Engineering Record in the US state of Ohio.

== Bridges ==
Survey No.	Name (as assigned by HAER)	Status	Type	Built	Documented	Carries	Crosses	Location	County	Coordinates
KY-28	U.S. Route 27 Central Bridge	Replaced	Cantilever	1890	1989	US 27	Ohio River	Cincinnati, Ohio, and Newport, Kentucky	Hamilton County, Ohio, and Campbell County, Kentucky	39°05′46″N 84°30′04″W
OH-5	Abbey Avenue Viaduct (commons)	Replaced	Viaduct	1888	1978	Abbey Avenue	Walworth Valley	Cleveland	Cuyahoga	41°29′04″N 81°41′41″W
OH-6	Detroit Superior High Level Bridge	Extant	Steel arch	1917	1979	US 6 / US 20 / US 42 / SR 3	Cuyahoga River	Cleveland	Cuyahoga	41°29′38″N 81°42′13″W
OH-7	Superior Avenue Viaduct (commons)	Extant (partial)	Stone arch	1878	1978	Superior Avenue	Cuyahoga River	Cleveland	Cuyahoga	41°29′45″N 81°42′12″W
OH-8	Old Detroit Street Bridge	Extant	Stone arch	1855	1978	Detroit Avenue	Cleveland and Mahoning Valley Railroad	Cleveland	Cuyahoga	41°29′35″N 81°42′19″W
OH-9	Sidaway Avenue Footbridge	Abandoned	Suspension	1930	1978	Sidaway Avenue	Kingsbury Run	Cleveland	Cuyahoga	41°28′48″N 81°38′34″W
OH-10	Center Street Swing Bridge (commons)	Extant	Swing span	1901	1978	Center Street	Cuyahoga River	Cleveland	Cuyahoga	41°29′39″N 81°42′12″W
OH-14	Brookside Park Bridge (commons)	Extant	Reinforced concrete closed-spandrel arch	1909	1978	Cleveland Metroparks path	Big Creek	Cleveland	Cuyahoga	41°26′56″N 81°43′02″W
OH-15	B&O Railroad Bridge No. 464 (commons)	Abandoned	Strauss bascule	1907	1978	Baltimore and Ohio Railroad	Cuyahoga River Old Ship Channel	Cleveland	Cuyahoga	41°29′54″N 81°42′30″W
OH-16	Lorain–Carnegie Bridge	Extant	Viaduct	1932	1988	SR 10	Cuyahoga River	Cleveland	Cuyahoga	41°29′22″N 81°41′37″W
OH-21	Rocky River Bridge (commons)	Replaced	Reinforced concrete open-spandrel arch	1910	1976	US 20 (Detroit Avenue)	Rocky River	Rocky River	Cuyahoga	41°28′56″N 81°49′53″W
OH-22	Y-Bridge	Replaced	Reinforced concrete closed-spandrel arch	1901	1986	US 40	Licking and Muskingum rivers	Zanesville	Muskingum	39°56′26″N 82°00′52″W
OH-23	Third Street Southeast Bridge (commons)	Replaced	Pratt truss	1883	1982	Third Street Southeast	Nimishillen Creek	Canton	Stark	40°47′37″N 81°21′29″W
OH-24	46th Street Bridge	Replaced	Viaduct	1896	1981	SR 84 (46th Street)	Ashtabula River	Ashtabula	Ashtabula	41°51′53″N 80°46′44″W
OH-27	Chesapeake and Ohio Railroad Bridge	Extant	Cantilever	1929	1982	Chesapeake and Ohio Railway	Ohio River	Cincinnati, Ohio, and Covington, Kentucky	Hamilton County, Ohio, and Kenton County, Kentucky	39°05′29″N 84°31′11″W
OH-28; KY-20	Cincinnati Suspension Bridge	Extant	Suspension	1867	1982	KY 17	Ohio River	Cincinnati, Ohio, and Covington, Kentucky	Hamilton County, Ohio, and Kenton County, Kentucky	39°05′32″N 84°30′34″W
OH-34	Main Street Bridge (commons)	Replaced	Pennsylvania truss	1897	1984	Main Street	Grand River	Painesville	Lake	41°43′34″N 81°14′17″W
OH-35	Burrville Road Bridge (commons)	Replaced	Pratt truss	1887	1985	TR 33 (Burrville Road)	Toti Creek	Fort Recovery	Mercer	40°28′36″N 84°43′37″W
OH-37	Millgrove Road Bridge (commons)	Replaced	Baltimore truss	1892	1984	CR 38 (Mason–Morrow–Millgrove Road)	Little Miami River	Morrow	Warren	39°22′43″N 84°05′33″W
OH-39	White Bowstring Arch Truss Bridge (commons)	Extant	Bowstring arch truss	1877	1986	Cemetery Drive	Yellow Creek	Poland	Mahoning	41°01′39″N 80°36′32″W
OH-40	Main Street Parker Pony Truss Bridge (commons)	Replaced	Parker truss	1904	1986	SR 170 (Main Street)	Yellow Creek	Poland	Mahoning	41°01′20″N 80°36′38″W
OH-41	Mahoning Avenue Pratt Double-Deck Bridge (commons)	Replaced	Pratt truss	1903	1986	CR 319 (Mahoning Avenue)	Mill Creek	Youngstown	Mahoning	41°06′06″N 80°40′20″W
OH-42	"Forder" Pratt Through Truss Bridge (commons)	Replaced	Pratt truss	1889	1986	CR 73	Maumee River	Antwerp	Paulding	41°13′20″N 84°40′11″W
OH-43	Fosnaugh Truss Leg Bedstead Bridge (commons)	Replaced	Pratt truss	1891	1986	TR 128	Scippo Creek	Stoutsville	Fairfield	39°35′25″N 82°49′38″W
OH-44	John Bright No. 1 Iron Bridge	Relocated	Suspension truss	1885	1986	TR 263 (Havenport Road)	Poplar Creek	Carroll	Fairfield	39°49′46″N 82°40′27″W
OH-45	John Bright No. 2 Covered Bridge	Relocated	Suspension truss	1881	1986	TR 263 (Bish Road)	Poplar Creek	Carroll	Fairfield	39°49′50″N 82°40′22″W
OH-46	Smith Road Bowstring Arch Bridge (commons)	Extant	Bowstring arch truss	1870	1986	TR 62 (Parks Road)	Sycamore Creek	Lykens Township	Crawford	40°55′38″N 83°02′09″W
OH-47	First Street Reinforced Concrete Bridge (commons)	Replaced	Reinforced concrete closed-spandrel arch	1909	1986	CR 7 (First Street)	Moxahala Creek	Roseville	Muskingum	39°48′14″N 82°04′16″W
OH-48	Abbott's Parker Through Truss Bridge (commons)	Replaced	Parker truss	1897	1986	CR 33	Sandusky River	Tiffin	Seneca	41°12′34″N 83°08′47″W
OH-49	Harrison Road Camelback Through Truss Bridge (commons)	Replaced	Parker truss	1897	1986	CR 457 (Harrison Road)	Great Miami River	Miamitown	Hamilton	39°12′59″N 84°42′11″W
OH-50	Benson Street Concrete Bowstring Bridge (commons)	Extant	Reinforced concrete through arch	1910	1986	Benson Street	Mill Creek	Lockland	Hamilton	39°13′27″N 84°26′56″W
OH-51	Town Creek Truss-Leg Bedstead Bridge (commons)	Relocated	Pratt truss	1894	1986	CR 82	Town Creek	Van Wert	Van Wert	40°48′54″N 84°36′52″W
OH-52	Bladensburg Concrete Bowstring Bridge (commons)	Extant	Reinforced concrete through arch	1928	1986	SR 541	Wakatomika Creek	Bladensburg	Knox	40°17′05″N 82°16′41″W
OH-53	Scioto Pennsylvania Through Truss Bridge (commons)	Replaced	Pennsylvania truss	1915	1986	SR 73	Wakatomika Creek	Portsmouth	Scioto	38°43′58″N 83°00′41″W
OH-54	Old Colerain Pennsylvania Through Truss Bridge (commons)	Replaced	Pennsylvania truss	1894	1986	CR 463	Great Miami River	Ross	Butler and Hamilton	39°18′12″N 84°38′34″W
OH-55	Columbus Road Lift Bridge (commons)	Extant	Vertical-lift bridge	1940	1986	Columbus Road	Cuyahoga River	Cleveland	Cuyahoga	41°29′18″N 81°42′02″W
OH-56	Carter Road Lift Bridge (commons)	Extant	Vertical-lift bridge	1940	1986	Carter Road	Cuyahoga River	Cleveland	Cuyahoga	41°29′39″N 81°41′52″W
OH-59-F	Ohio and Erie Canal, Tinkers Creek Aqueduct	Replaced	Pratt truss	1826	1986	Ohio and Erie Canal	Tinkers Creek	Valley View	Cuyahoga	41°21′53″N 81°36′32″W
OH-61	Ohio and Erie Canal, Furnace Run Aqueduct (commons)	Ruin	Bowstring arch truss	1859	1986	Ohio and Erie Canal	Furnace Run	Everett	Summit	41°12′07″N 81°34′21″W
OH-62	Jaite Company Railroad Bridge (commons)	Extant	Pratt truss	1909	1987	Baltimore and Ohio Railroad spur	Cuyahoga River	Everett	Summit	41°17′05″N 81°34′02″W
OH-66	Brecksville-Northfield High Level Bridge	Extant	Reinforced concrete open-spandrel arch	1931	1985	SR 82	Cuyahoga River	Brecksville and Northfield	Cuyahoga and Summit	41°19′17″N 81°35′14″W
OH-67	Station Road Bridge	Extant	Whipple truss	1882	1985	Station Road	Cuyahoga River	Brecksville and Northfield	Cuyahoga and Summit	41°19′10″N 81°35′15″W
OH-70	Cleves Bridge (commons)	Replaced	Parker truss	1914	1990	US 50 eastbound	Great Miami River	Cleves	Hamilton	39°10′11″N 84°45′28″W
OH-72	Broad Street Bridge	Replaced	Reinforced concrete closed-spandrel arch	1921	1989	US 40 (Broad Street)	Scioto River	Columbus	Franklin	39°57′42″N 83°00′18″W
OH-76	East Lockington Road Bridge (commons)	Replaced	Pratt truss	1898	1990	East Lockington Road	Great Miami River	Lockington	Shelby	40°12′36″N 84°12′55″W
OH-77	Milford Bridge (commons)	Replaced	Pennsylvania truss	1924	1990	US 50	Little Miami River	Milford	Clermont and Hamilton	39°10′18″N 84°17′54″W
OH-78	Boomershine Bridge (commons)	Replaced	Warren truss	1913	1991	Manning Road	Twin Creek	Farmersville	Montgomery	39°39′27″N 84°25′35″W
OH-80	Cherry Street Bridge (commons)	Replaced	Pratt truss	1913	1995	SR 93 (Cherry Street)	Tuscarawas River	Canal Fulton	Stark	40°53′20″N 81°35′57″W
OH-82	Sockman Road Bridge (commons)	Replaced	Howe truss	1873	1992	TR 384 (Sockman Road)	Granny Creek	Fredericktown	Knox	40°25′39″N 82°34′12″W
OH-83	Egypt Pike Bridge (commons)	Bypassed	Bowstring arch truss	1876	1992	CR 25 (Egypt Pike)	Mud Run	New Holland	Pickaway	39°33′28″N 83°15′34″W
OH-84	Zoarville Station Bridge (commons)	Extant	Fink truss	1868	1992	Old Zoarville Road	Conotton Creek	Zoarville	Tuscarawas	40°34′38″N 81°23′29″W
OH-85	Oak Knoll Park Bridge (commons)	Relocated	Howe truss	1859	1992	Oak Knoll Park trail		Massillon	Stark	40°47′19″N 81°31′32″W
OH-86	Blackhoof Street Bridge (commons)	Relocated	Bowstring arch truss	1864	1992	Lock One Park trail	Miami and Erie Canal	New Bremen	Auglaize	40°26′08″N 84°22′51″W
OH-87	Germantown Covered Bridge	Extant	Suspension truss	1865	1992	Center Street	Little Twin Creek	Germantown	Montgomery	39°37′34″N 84°21′54″W
OH-88	Mallaham Bridge (commons)	Extant	Bowstring arch truss	1876	1992	CR M-6	Riley Creek	Pandora	Putnam	40°58′42″N 83°59′27″W
OH-89	Falling Rock Camp Bridge (commons)	Relocated	Post truss	1872	1992	Falling Rock Camp entrance	Rocky Fork Creek	Hickman	Licking	40°10′47″N 82°18′05″W
OH-90	Whetstone Creek Bridge (commons)	Extant	Bowstring arch truss	1879	1992	TR 127	Whetstone Creek	Mount Gilead	Morrow	40°32′30″N 82°50′28″W
OH-91	Mill Road Bridge (commons)	Relocated	Bowstring arch truss	1872	1992	Ariel–Foundation Park trail	Central Lake	Mount Vernon	Knox	40°23′15″N 82°29′55″W
OH-92	Howard Bridge (commons)	Replaced	Pratt truss	1874	1992	CR 35	Kokosing River	Howard	Knox	40°24′18″N 82°19′20″W
OH-93	Dresden Suspension Bridge (commons)	Bypassed	Suspension	1914	1992	SR 208	Muskingum River	Dresden	Muskingum	40°07′14″N 82°00′02″W
OH-94	Towpath Bridge (commons)	Relocated	Howe truss	1872	1992	Triple Locks Park trail	Ohio and Erie Canal	Coshocton	Coshocton	40°17′02″N 81°52′39″W
OH-95	Rodrick Bridge (commons)	Relocated	Bowstring arch truss	1872	1992	TR 144	Wills Creek	Otsego	Muskingum	40°04′08″N 82°26′28″W
OH-96	Oakgrove Road Bridge (commons)	Demolished	Bowstring arch truss	1874	1992	TR 42	Little Miami River	Dodsonville	Highland	39°13′58″N 83°50′31″W
OH-97	Junction Road Bridge (commons)	Replaced	Bowstring arch truss	1875	1992	TR 235 (Junction Road)	Four Mile Creek	Morning Sun	Preble	39°36′16″N 84°45′46″W
OH-98	W. H. Pratt Bridge (commons)	Extant	Reinforced concrete closed-spandrel arch	1896	1992	TR 369	Kokosing River tributary	Fredericktown	Knox	40°30′44″N 82°36′52″W
OH-99	Tipp–Elizabeth Road Bridge (commons)	Replaced	Pennsylvania truss	1926	1993	TR 166 (Tipp–Elizabeth Road)	Great Miami River	Tipp City	Miami	39°58′04″N 84°10′00″W
OH-101	Laymon Road Bridge (commons)	Relocated	Bowstring arch truss	1871	1993	Judy Gano Trail	J. W. Williams City Park lake	Wilmington	Clinton	39°26′38″N 83°48′28″W
OH-102	Cincinnati, Jackson & Mackinaw Railroad Bridge (commons)	Abandoned	Steel built-up girder	1895	1994	Penn Central Railroad (abandoned)	Tom's Run	Farmersville	Montgomery	39°41′34″N 84°27′30″W
OH-104	Washington Street Bridge (commons)	Replaced	Rolling lift (Scherzer) bascule	1920	1995	Washington Street	Miami and Erie Canal	Toledo	Lucas	41°38′48″N 83°32′12″W
OH-105	Monroe Street Bridge (commons)	Replaced	Rolling lift (Scherzer) bascule	1907	1995	Washington Street	Miami and Erie Canal	Toledo	Lucas	41°38′52″N 83°32′06″W
OH-106	U.S. Route 52 Bridge (commons)	Replaced	Steel girder	1931	1996	US 52	Isaacs Creek	Manchester	Adams	38°41′05″N 83°37′17″W
OH-107	Ashtabula Viaduct (commons)	Replaced	Reinforced concrete open-spandrel arch	1928	1997	US 20 (Prospect Road)	Ashtabula River	Ashtabula	Ashtabula	41°52′21″N 80°46′44″W
OH-110	Hopewell Road Bridge (commons)	Replaced	Pennsylvania truss	1922	1996	Hopewell Road	Little Miami River	Loveland	Hamilton	39°14′48″N 84°17′43″W
OH-111	Third Avenue Bridge (commons)	Replaced	Reinforced concrete closed-spandrel arch	1919	1995	West Third Avenue	Olentangy River	Columbus	Franklin	39°59′03″N 83°01′17″W
OH-112	King Avenue Bridge (commons)	Replaced	Reinforced concrete closed-spandrel arch	1914	1995	King Avenue	Olentangy River	Columbus	Franklin	39°59′27″N 83°01′27″W
OH-113	Blue Rock Road Bridge (commons)	Demolished	Parker truss	1914	1996	Blue Rock Road	Great Miami River	New Baltimore	Hamilton	39°15′47″N 84°40′03″W
OH-117	Putnam Street Bridge	Replaced	Swing span	1860	2004	Putnam Street	Muskingum River	Marietta	Washington	39°24′49″N 81°27′28″W
OH-122	Eldean Bridge	Extant	Howe truss	1860	2004	Eldean Road	Great Miami River	Rinard Mills	Monroe	40°04′40″N 84°13′00″W
OH-123	Crum Bridge	Destroyed	Burr truss	1867	2004	TR 384A (Old Camp Road)	Little Muskingum River	Rinard Mills	Monroe	39°36′04″N 81°09′26″W
OH-125	Pottersburg Bridge (commons)	Relocated	Partridge truss	1872	2004	North Lewisburg Trail	Big Darby Creek	North Lewisburg	Union	40.2406448°N 83.5287362°W
OH-126	Harshman Bridge	Extant	Childs truss	1894	2004	Concord-Fairhaven Road	Four Mile Creek	Fairhaven	Preble	39°42′09″N 84°46′11″W
OH-127	Salt Creek Bridge	Extant	Childs truss	1876	2004	CR 82 (Arch Hill Road)	Big Salt Creek	Norwich	Muskingum	39°59′57″N 81°50′23″W
OH-128	Piqua Bridge (commons)	Replaced	Reinforced concrete closed-spandrel arch	1915	2002	East Main Street	Great Miami River	Piqua	Miami	40°08′44″N 84°14′19″W
OH-130	Rinard Bridge (Note: See also HAER No. PA-645, "Structural Study of Smith Trusses" for additional documentation)	Extant	Smith truss	1876	2015	CR 406	Little Muskingum River	Wingett Run	Washington	39°32′13″N 81°13′21″W
OH-137	"S" Bridge	Bypassed	Stone arch	1828		National Road	Peters Creek	Cassell	Guernsey	40°00′37″N 81°39′27″W
OH-138	Strength of Burr-Arch Trusses		Burr truss		2016					
WV-12	Baltimore and Ohio Railroad, Parkersburg Bridge	Extant	Parker truss	1871	1973	CSX Transportation	Ohio River	Belpre, Ohio, and Parkersburg, West Virginia	Washington County, Ohio, and Wood County, West Virginia	39°16′15″N 81°33′56″W
WV-15	Baltimore and Ohio Railroad, Benwood Bridge	Extant	Parker truss	1870	1974	Former Baltimore and Ohio Railroad	Ohio River	Bellaire, Ohio, and Benwood, West Virginia	Belmont County, Ohio, and Marshall County, West Virginia	40°00′43″N 80°44′22″W
WV-25	Bridgeport Bridge	Replaced	Pratt truss	1893	1988	Former US 40	Ohio River back channel	Bridgeport, Ohio, and Wheeling, West Virginia	Belmont County, Ohio, and Ohio County, West Virginia	40°04′21″N 80°44′19″W
WV-73	Williamstown–Marietta Bridge	Replaced	Cantilever	1903	1987	SR 60/ WV 31	Ohio River	Marietta, Ohio, and Williamstown, West Virginia	Washington County, Ohio, and Wood County, West Virginia	39°24′32″N 81°26′53″W
WV-88	Parkersburg Suspension Bridge	Replaced	Suspension	1916	1973	Former US 50	Ohio River	Belpre, Ohio, and Parkersburg, West Virginia	Washington County, Ohio, and Wood County, West Virginia	39°16′15″N 81°33′58″W
