= Perry Township, Monroe County, Ohio =

Township in Ohio, US

- Township
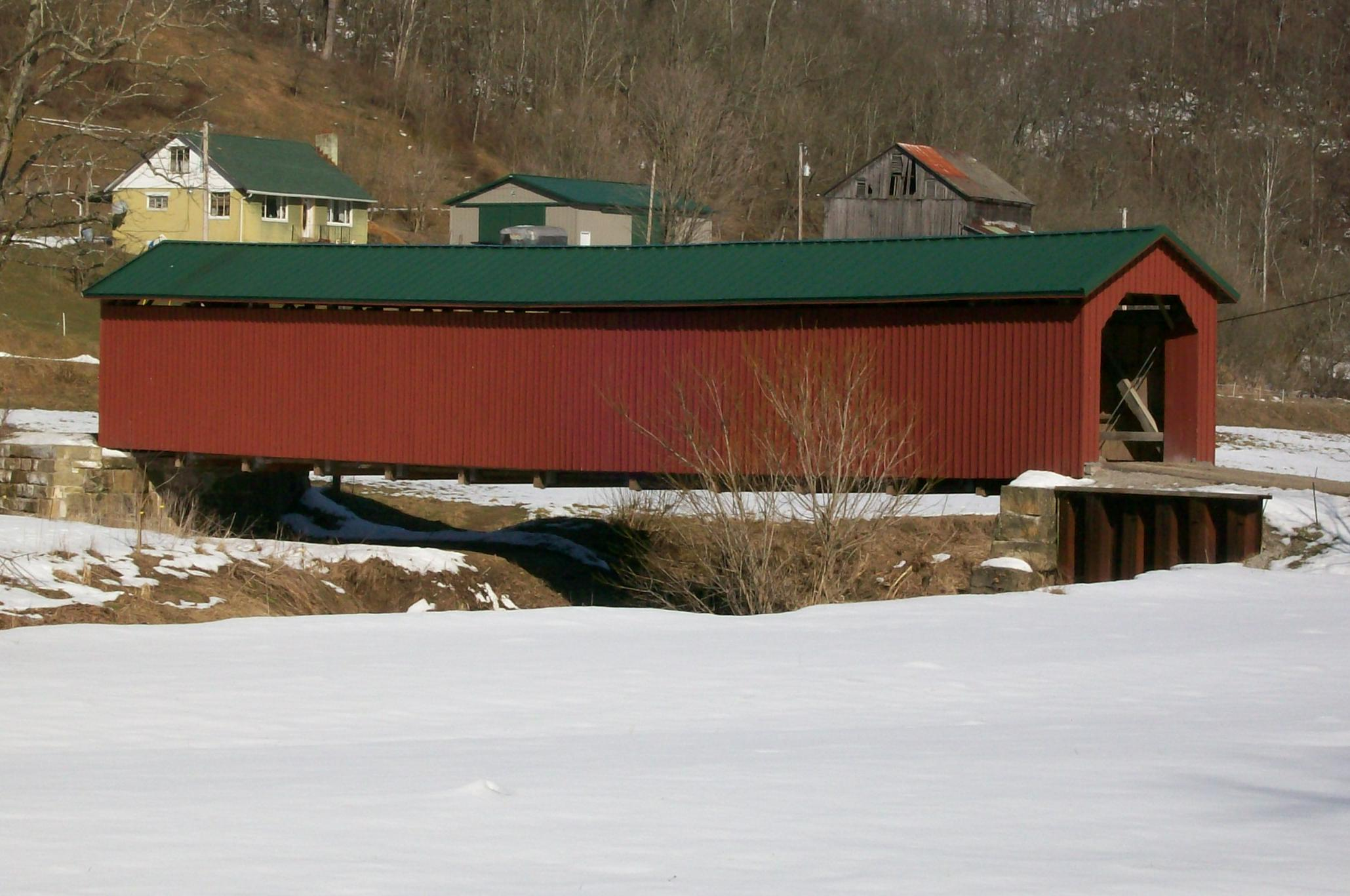
- The Foreaker Covered Bridge on the Little Muskingum River

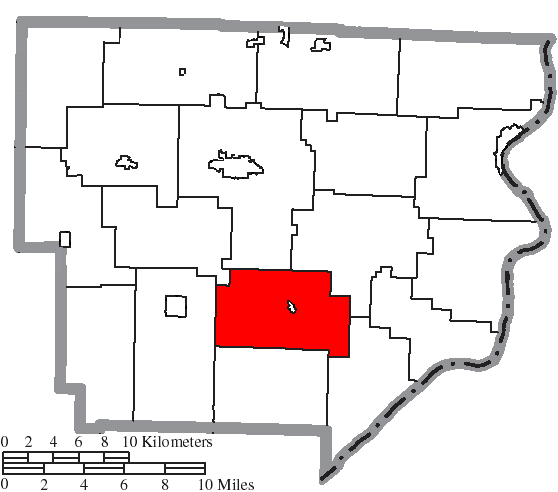
- Location of Perry Township in Monroe County
- Coordinates: 39°39′36″N 81°4′5″W
- Country: United States
- State: Ohio
- County: Monroe

Area
  - Total: 24.4 sq mi (63.1 km^{2})
  - Land: 24.4 sq mi (63.1 km^{2})
  - Water: 0 sq mi (0.0 km^{2})
- Elevation: 932 ft (284 m)

Population (2020)
  - Total: 420
  - Density: 17/sq mi (6.7/km^{2})
- Time zone: UTC-5 (Eastern (EST))
  - Summer (DST): UTC-4 (EDT)
- FIPS code: 39-61952
- GNIS feature ID: 1086656

Perry Township is one of the eighteen townships of Monroe County, Ohio, United States. As of the 2020 census, the population was 420, including 71 people in the village of Antioch.

== Geography ==
Located in the southern part of the county, it borders the following townships:

- Center Township - north
- Green Township - northeast
- Jackson Township - southeast
- Benton Township - south
- Washington Township - west
- Wayne Township - northwest

The village of Antioch is located in central Perry Township.

== Name and history ==
It is one of twenty-six Perry Townships statewide.

== Government ==
The township is governed by a three-member board of trustees, who are elected in November of odd-numbered years to a four-year term beginning on the following January 1. Two are elected in the year after the presidential election and one is elected in the year before it. There is also an elected township fiscal officer, who serves a four-year term beginning on April 1 of the year after the election, which is held in November of the year before the presidential election. Vacancies in the fiscal officership or on the board of trustees are filled by the remaining trustees.
