= Knowlton Covered Bridge =

- U.S. National Register of Historic Places
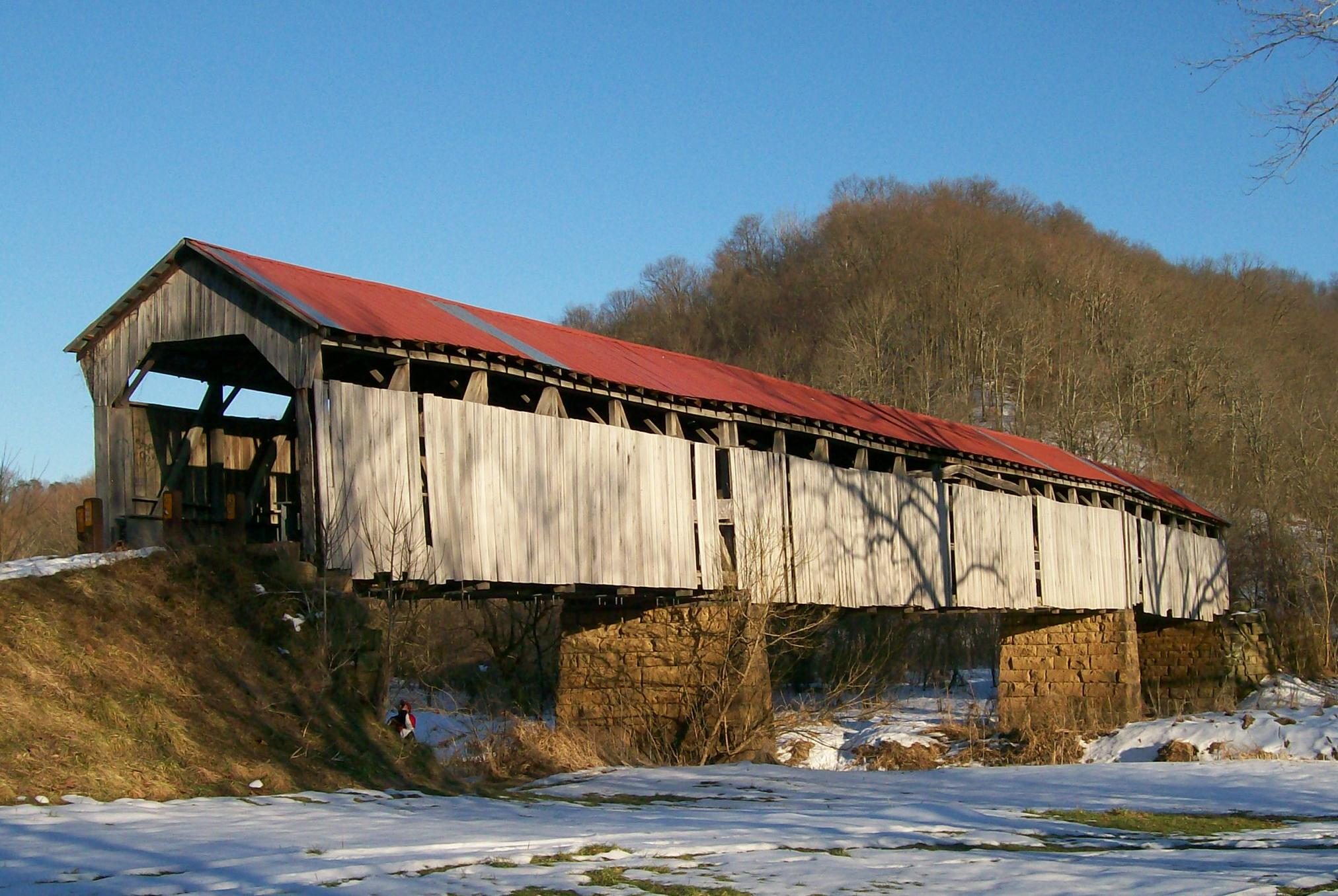

- Location within Ohio
- Nearest city: Rinard Mills, Ohio
- Coordinates: 39°36′04″N 81°09′26″W
- Area: less than one acre
- Built: 1887
- Architectural style: Burr arch truss bridge
- NRHP reference No.: 80003165
- Added to NRHP: March 11, 1980

The Knowlton Covered Bridge, near Rinard Mills, Ohio, was built in 1887, although its center span may date to 1867. It was listed on the National Register of Historic Places in 1980. It was decommissioned shortly after. Also known as the Long Covered Bridge, it is a Burr arch truss bridge.

It is located north of Rinard Mills, and is in Washington Township, Monroe County, Ohio.

The bridge has three spans over the Little Muskingum River. It was rehabilitated in 1995 and documented by the Historic American Engineering Record in 2004.

It is mentioned in the Ohio Historic Places Dictionary.

The middle span collapsed on July 5, 2019, and the southern approach span collapsed on June 17, 2020. Reconstruction began in fall 2023 and was completed in the summer of 2024.

== See also ==
- List of bridges documented by the Historic American Engineering Record in Ohio
