= Foreaker Covered Bridge =

- Foreaker Bridge
- U.S. National Register of Historic Places
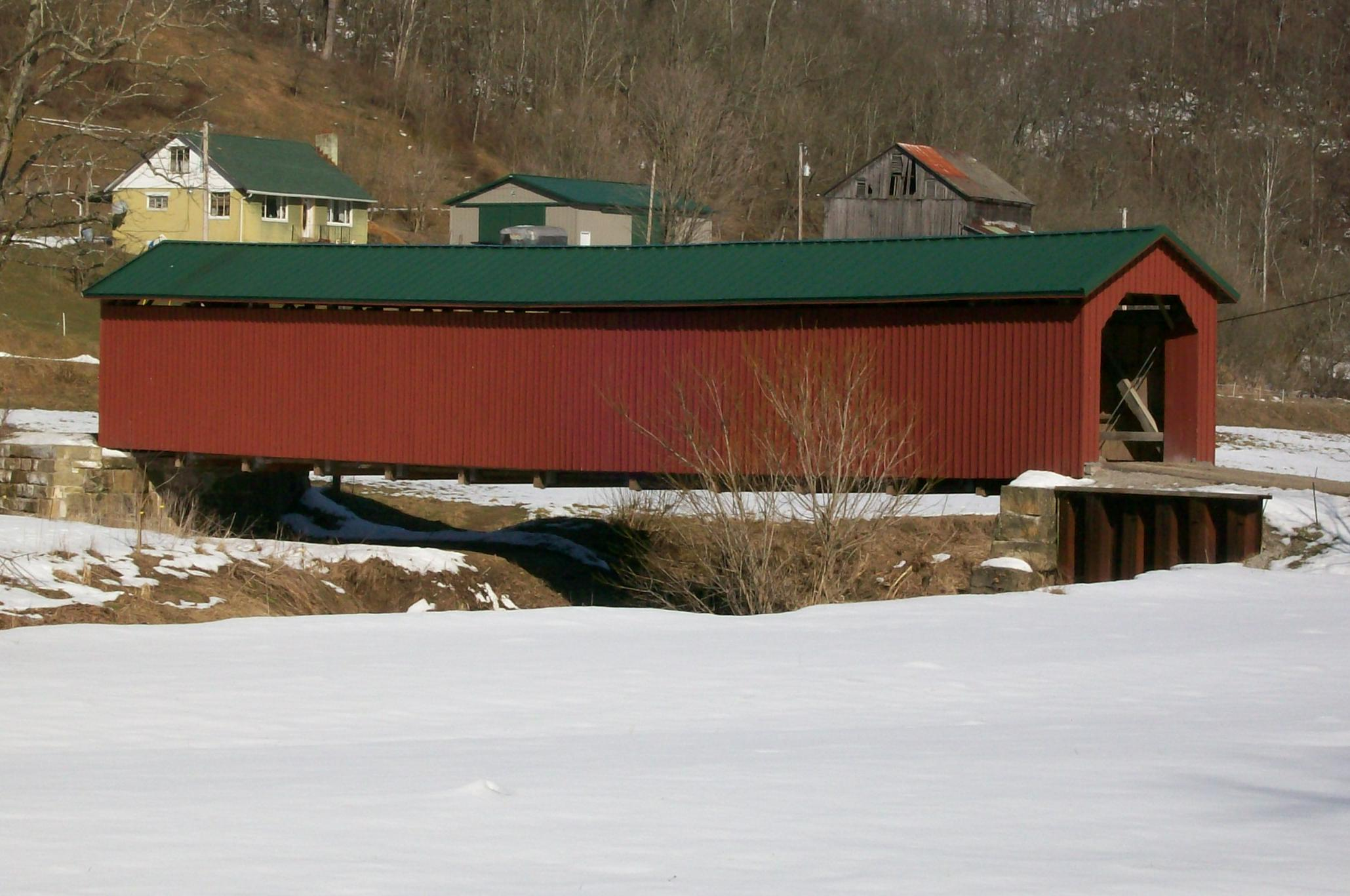
- The bridge in early 2010.

- Location within Ohio Location within the United States
- Nearest city: Graysville, Ohio
- Coordinates: 39°39′20″N 81°7′16″W
- Area: Less than 1 acre (0.40 ha)
- Built: 1886
- Architect: Isaiah Cline
- Architectural style: Kingpost truss
- NRHP reference No.: 75001493
- Added to NRHP: June 5, 1975

The Foreaker Covered Bridge, with the first word sometimes spelled Foraker, and also called the Weddle Covered Bridge, is located on Monroe County Road 40, three miles east of Graysville, Ohio. The property was listed on the National Register in 1975.

== History ==
The Foreaker Bridge was built over the Little Muskingum River in 1886 in order to help ease traffic heading from the inner communities of Monroe County to the county seat at Woodsfield. The area is surrounded by large hills and steep valleys causing these agrarian families to circle around to a lower level of passage, while the water has cut a deep channel under the site of the bridge.

The Foreaker family owned the land around the south end of the bridge when it was built.

One of two extant covered bridges in Monroe County, the Foreaker Bridge is a single-span structure with a king post truss core. The white oak walls are vertically sided and covered with a metal roof; its builder was anonymous, although the stone abutments are known to have been constructed by Isaiah Cline. When the bridge was erected, it took the name of a family named Foreaker, which owned an adjacent farm; the Foreakers sold the property in 1925 to a Mr. Weddle, and the bridge has also sometimes been known as the "Weddle Bridge".

The bridge was reinforced in 1938 for automobile traffic and has been well maintained by the county. The bridge is still open to automobile traffic. In 1971 a large section of the roof was blown off in a windstorm and led to the entire roof being replaced with sheet metal. Currently, the bridge is repainted every year and inspected. The abutments have been reinforced with concrete to add stability.

The floor is made of oak planks with additional beams and supportive I-beams added later.
