= Rinard Covered Bridge =

- U.S. National Register of Historic Places
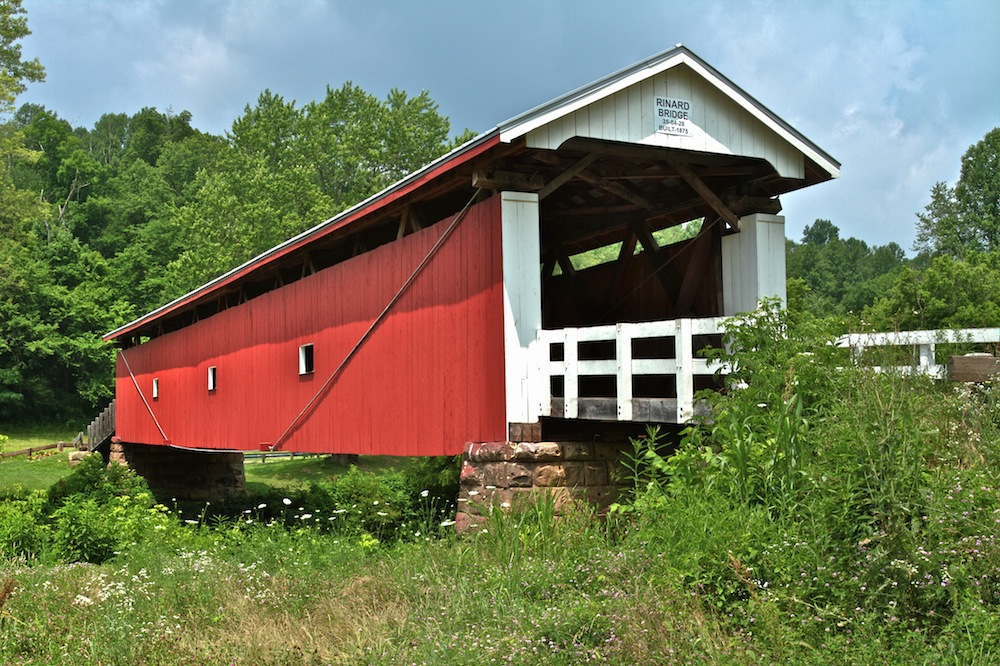
- Restored bridge c.2010

- Location within Ohio Location within the United States
- Nearest city: Marietta, Ohio
- Coordinates: 39°32′13″N 81°13′21″W
- Area: less than one acre
- Built: 1876
- Built by: Smith Bridge Company
- Architect: H. H. Townsend
- Architectural style: Smith truss
- NRHP reference No.: 76001546
- Added to NRHP: October 8, 1976

The Rinard Covered Bridge, near Marietta, Ohio, was built in 1876. It was listed on the National Register of Historic Places in 1976.

It is a Smith truss bridge built by the Smith Bridge Company of Toledo, Ohio and is a work of H. H. Townsend. It has also been known as Hendershott's Ford Bridge.

It is located northeast of Wingett Run on County Road 406 in Ludlow Township, Washington County, Ohio.

It spans the Little Muskingum River. The bridge was destroyed by a flash flood on September 18, 2004 and was rebuilt in 2006.

It is covered in the Ohio Historic Places Dictionary.

== See also ==
- List of bridges documented by the Historic American Engineering Record in Ohio
