= Washington Township, Monroe County, Ohio =

Township in Ohio, US

- Township
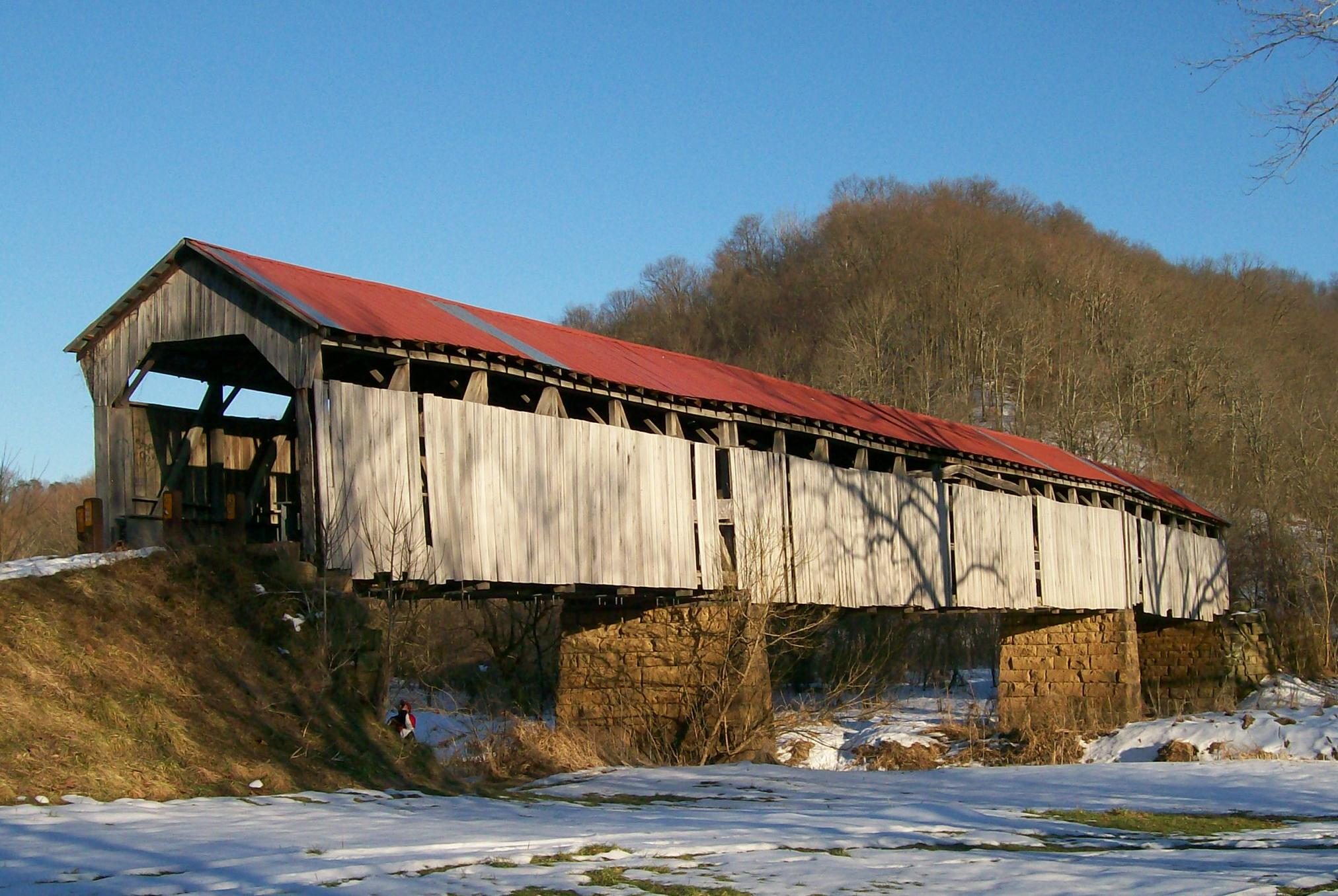
- The Knowlton Covered Bridge on the Little Muskingum River

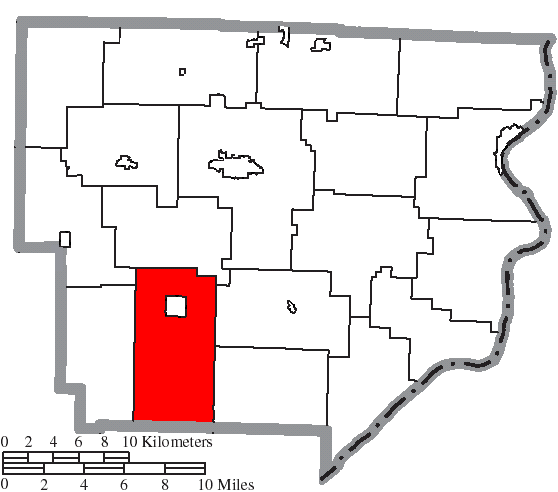
- Location of Washington Township in Monroe County
- Coordinates: 39°38′31″N 81°10′32″W
- Country: United States
- State: Ohio
- County: Monroe

Area
  - Total: 31.0 sq mi (80.2 km^{2})
  - Land: 30.9 sq mi (80.1 km^{2})
  - Water: 0 sq mi (0.0 km^{2})
- Elevation: 860 ft (262 m)

Population (2020)
  - Total: 429
  - Density: 13.9/sq mi (5.36/km^{2})
- Time zone: UTC-5 (Eastern (EST))
  - Summer (DST): UTC-4 (EDT)
- FIPS code: 39-81480
- GNIS feature ID: 1086662

Washington Township is one of the eighteen townships of Monroe County, Ohio, United States. As of the 2020 census, the population was 429, including 70 people in the village of Graysville.

== Geography ==
Located in the southwestern part of the county, it borders the following townships:

- Wayne Township - north
- Perry Township - northeast
- Benton Township - east
- Grandview Township, Washington County - southeast corner
- Ludlow Township, Washington County - south
- Bethel Township - west
- Franklin Township - northwest

The village of Graysville is located in northern Washington Township, and the unincorporated community of Rinard Mills lies along the Little Muskingum River in the township's southwest.

== Name and history ==
It is one of forty-three Washington Townships statewide.

== Government ==
The township is governed by a three-member board of trustees, who are elected in November of odd-numbered years to a four-year term beginning on the following January 1. Two are elected in the year after the presidential election and one is elected in the year before it. There is also an elected township fiscal officer, who serves a four-year term beginning on April 1 of the year after the election, which is held in November of the year before the presidential election. Vacancies in the fiscal officership or on the board of trustees are filled by the remaining trustees.
