= Benton Township, Ohio =

Benton Township, Ohio, may refer to:

- Benton Township, Hocking County, Ohio
- Benton Township, Monroe County, Ohio
- Benton Township, Ottawa County, Ohio
- Benton Township, Paulding County, Ohio
- Benton Township, Pike County, Ohio
