= Moss Run =

Moss Run may refer to:

- Moss Run, Ohio, an unincorporated community
- Moss Run (Little Muskingum River tributary), a stream in Ohio
- Moss Run, Virginia, an unincorporated community
