= Wingett (disambiguation) =

Mark Wingett (born 1961) is an English actor.

Wingett may also refer to

- Wingett Run, Ohio, an unincorporated community in the United States
- John Wingett Davies (1908–1992), British cinema operator and director of Davies and Newman

== See also ==
- Winget (disambiguation)
