= Wayne Township, Ohio =

Wayne Township, Ohio, may refer to:

- Wayne Township, Adams County, Ohio
- Wayne Township, Ashtabula County, Ohio
- Wayne Township, Auglaize County, Ohio
- Wayne Township, Belmont County, Ohio
- Wayne Township, Butler County, Ohio
- Wayne Township, Champaign County, Ohio
- Wayne Township, Clermont County, Ohio
- Wayne Township, Clinton County, Ohio
- Wayne Township, Columbiana County, Ohio
- Wayne Township, Darke County, Ohio
- Wayne Township, Fayette County, Ohio
- Wayne Township, Jefferson County, Ohio
- Wayne Township, Knox County, Ohio
- Wayne Township, Mercer County, Ohio (paper township, now part of Celina, Ohio)
- Wayne Township, Monroe County, Ohio
- Wayne Township, Montgomery County, Ohio (defunct, now Huber Heights, Ohio)
- Wayne Township, Muskingum County, Ohio
- Wayne Township, Noble County, Ohio
- Wayne Township, Pickaway County, Ohio
- Wayne Township, Tuscarawas County, Ohio
- Wayne Township, Warren County, Ohio
- Wayne Township, Wayne County, Ohio
- Noble Township, Auglaize County, Ohio, named Wayne Township while it remained a part of Mercer County prior to the creation of Auglaize County in 1848
