= Wingett Run =

Stream in Ohio, U.S.

Coordinates: 39°32′15″N 81°14′24″W

Wingett Run is a stream in the U.S. state of Ohio. It is a tributary to the Little Muskingum River.

The stream was named after Jacob Wingett, who owned land near the mouth of Wingett Run in the 1830s.
