= Winget =

Winget may refer to:

- Windows Package Manager, also known as winget

== People with the surname ==
- Don Winget, American astronomer
- Jennifer Winget (born 1985), Indian actress

== See also ==
- Wingett (disambiguation)
