= Antioch, Ohio =

- Village
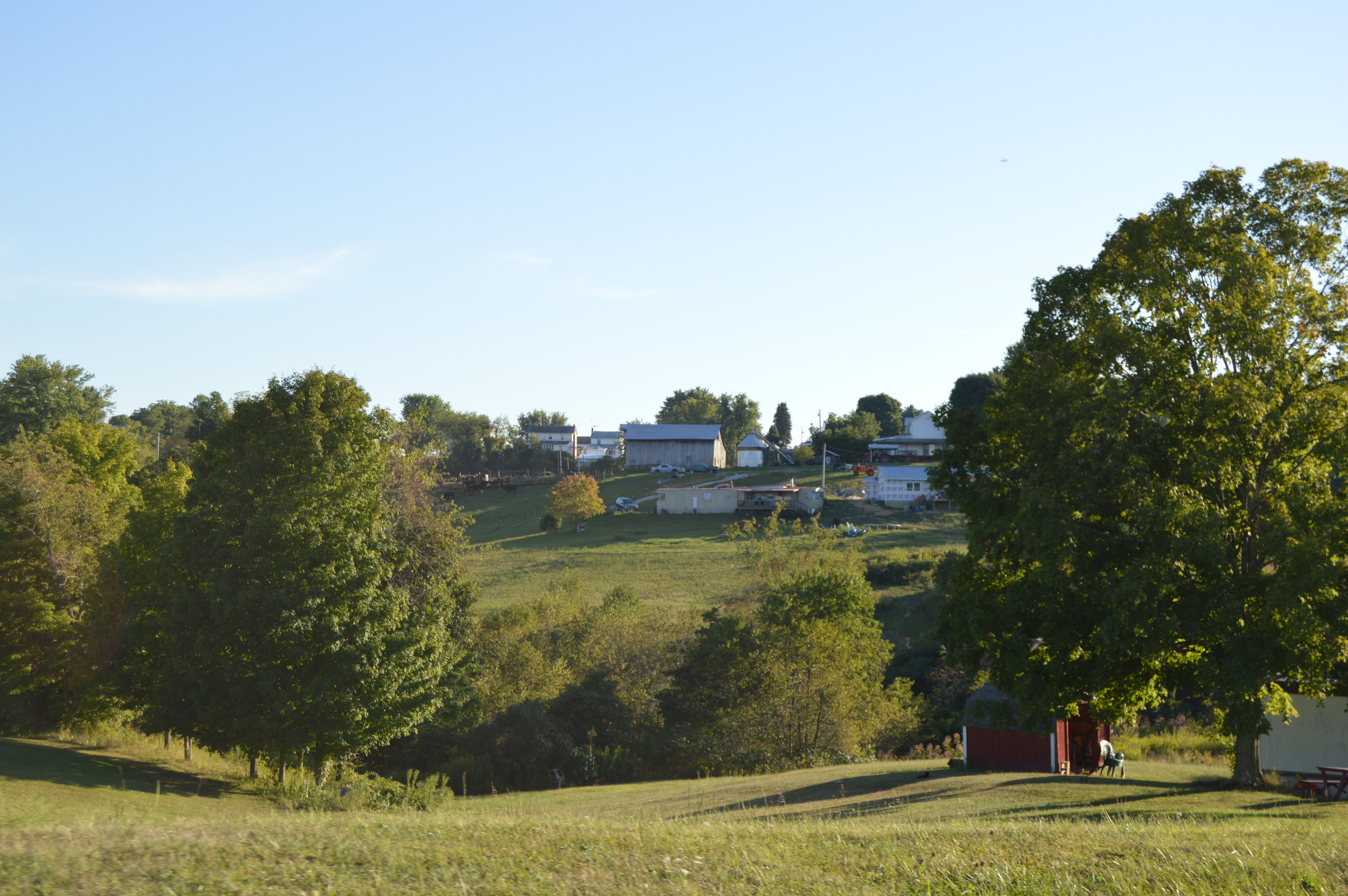
- Overview from the north

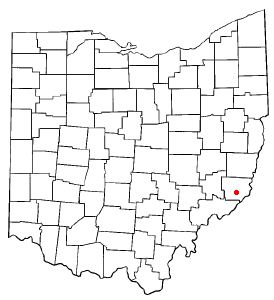
- Location of Antioch, Ohio

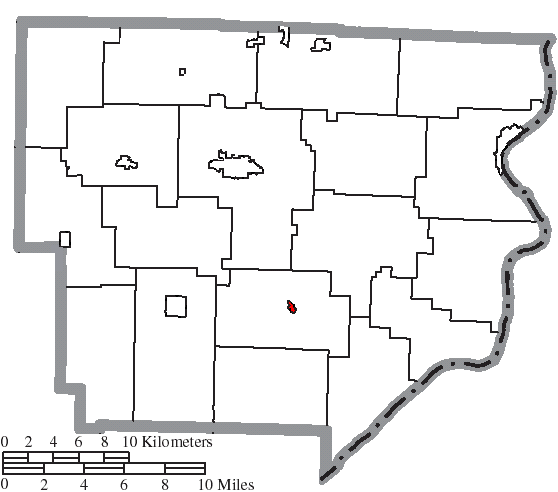
- Location of Antioch in Monroe County
- Coordinates: 39°39′40″N 81°04′01″W
- Country: United States
- State: Ohio
- County: Monroe
- Township: Perry

Area
  - Total: 0.10 sq mi (0.27 km^{2})
  - Land: 0.10 sq mi (0.27 km^{2})
  - Water: 0 sq mi (0.00 km^{2})
- Elevation: 1,040 ft (320 m)

Population (2020)
  - Total: 71
  - Estimate (2023): 74
  - Density: 690.8/sq mi (266.72/km^{2})
- Time zone: UTC-5 (Eastern (EST))
  - Summer (DST): UTC-4 (EDT)
- ZIP code: 43793
- Area code: 740
- FIPS code: 39-02148
- GNIS feature ID: 2397969

Antioch is a village in Monroe County, Ohio, United States. The population was 71 at the 2020 census.

== Geography ==
According to the United States Census Bureau, the village has a total area of 0.11 square miles (0.28 km^{2}), all of it land.

== Demographics ==
Historical population
Census	Pop.	Note	%±
1850	107		—
1860	156		45.8%
1870	165		5.8%
1900	212		—
1910	169		−20.3%
1920	133		−21.3%
1930	138		3.8%
1940	145		5.1%
1950	112		−22.8%
1960	110		−1.8%
1970	112		1.8%
1980	113		0.9%
1990	68		−39.8%
2000	89		30.9%
2010	86		−3.4%
2020	71		−17.4%
2023 (est.)	74	▲	4.2%
U.S. Decennial Census

=== 2010 census ===
As of the census of 2010, there were 86 people, 33 households, and 21 families living in the village. The population density was 781.8 inhabitants per square mile (301.9/km^{2}). There were 44 housing units at an average density of 400.0 per square mile (154.4/km^{2}). The racial makeup of the village was 97.7% White, 1.2% African American, and 1.2% from two or more races.

There were 33 households, of which 30.3% had children under the age of 18 living with them, 45.5% were married couples living together, 12.1% had a female householder with no husband present, 6.1% had a male householder with no wife present, and 36.4% were non-families. 30.3% of all households were made up of individuals, and 15.1% had someone living alone who was 65 years of age or older. The average household size was 2.61 and the average family size was 3.19.

The median age in the village was 42.5 years. 25.6% of residents were under the age of 18; 4.6% were between the ages of 18 and 24; 23.3% were from 25 to 44; 34.9% were from 45 to 64; and 11.6% were 65 years of age or older. The gender makeup of the village was 52.3% male and 47.7% female.

=== 2000 census ===
As of the census of 2000, there were 89 people, 34 households, and 26 families living in the village. The population density was 859.2 inhabitants per square mile (331.7/km^{2}). There were 43 housing units at an average density of 415.1 per square mile (160.3/km^{2}). The racial makeup of the village was 100.00% White. Hispanic or Latino of any race were 3.37% of the population.

There were 34 households, out of which 38.2% had children under the age of 18 living with them, 73.5% were married couples living together, and 20.6% were non-families. 17.6% of all households were made up of individuals, and 17.6% had someone living alone who was 65 years of age or older. The average household size was 2.62 and the average family size was 3.00.

In the village, the population was spread out, with 28.1% under the age of 18, 3.4% from 18 to 24, 28.1% from 25 to 44, 20.2% from 45 to 64, and 20.2% who were 65 years of age or older. The median age was 40 years. For every 100 females there were 71.2 males. For every 100 females age 18 and over, there were 93.9 males.

The median income for a household in the village was $25,313, and the median income for a family was $41,250. Males had a median income of $28,750 versus $20,750 for females. The per capita income for the village was $14,547. There were 3.8% of families and 10.8% of the population living below the poverty line, including 5.6% of under eighteens and 31.8% of those over 64.
