= Sacket Run =

Stream in Ohio, U.S.

Coordinates: 39°32′50″N 81°13′22″W

Sacket Run is a stream in the U.S. state of Ohio. It is a tributary to the Little Muskingum River.

A variant name is "Sackett Run". The stream was named after a local hunter with the surname Sackett.
