= Wingett Run, Ohio =

Unincorporated community in Ohio, U.S.

Coordinates: 39°32′12″N 81°14′35″W

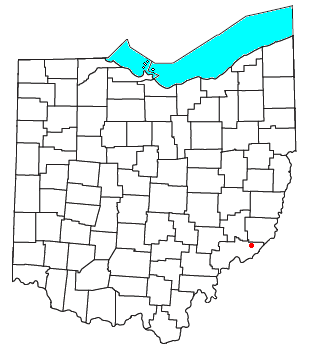
Location of Wingett Run, Ohio

Wingett Run is an unincorporated community in western Ludlow Township, Washington County, Ohio, United States. It has a post office with the ZIP code 45789. It is located along State Route 26 and the Little Muskingum River.

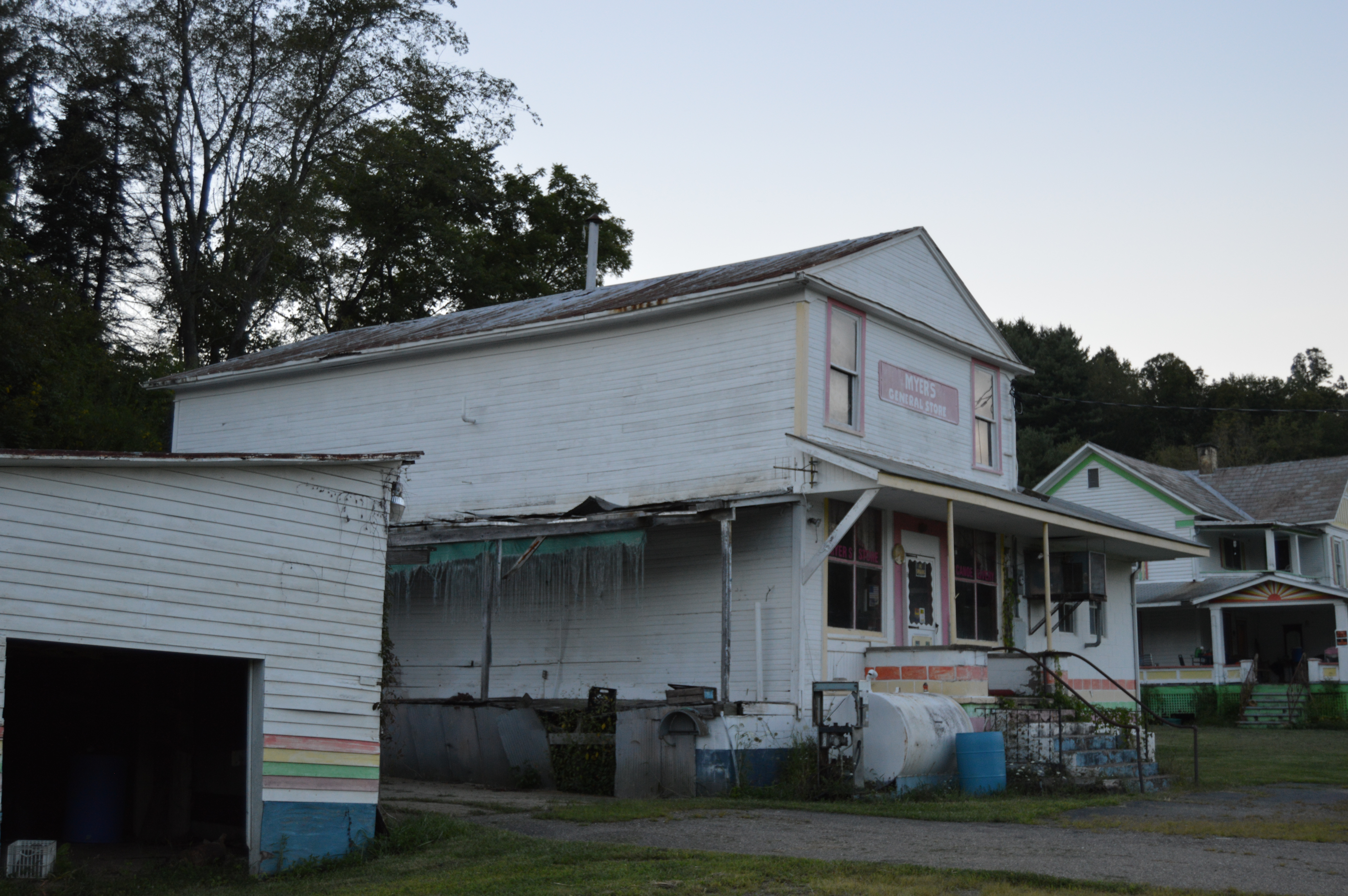
Myers General Store

A post office called Wingett Run was in operation from 1873 to 1993. The name comes from the nearby stream, Wingett Run, which itself was named after an early settler of the region, Jacob Wingett.
