= Sidaway Bridge =

U.S. Suspension Bridge

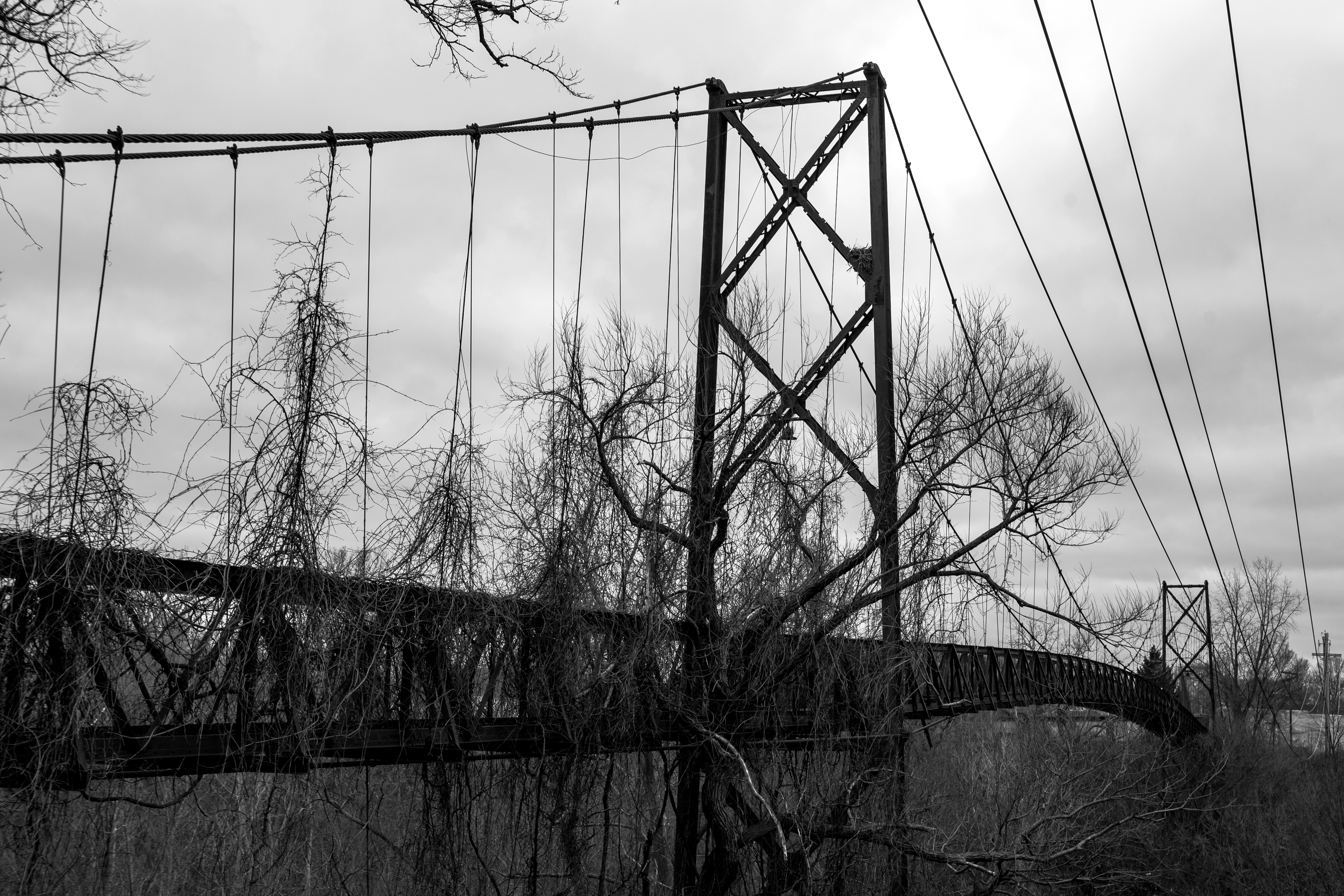
- Sidaway Bridge covered in vegetation, looking Southwest.
- Coordinates: 41°28′47.26″N 81°38′32.31″W

Characteristics
- Design: Suspension
- Total length: 680 feet (210 m)
- Height: 158 feet (48 m)

History
- Architect: Fred L. Plummer
- Construction start: 1929
- Construction end: 1930
- Closed: 1966
- Replaces: Tod-Kinsman Bridge

Sidaway Bridge is a bridge in Cleveland, Ohio. It spans the Kingsbury Run ravine, between Sidaway Avenue and East 65th Street, and is Cleveland's only suspension bridge. The footbridge spans 680 feet (210 m) with steel towers 158 feet (48 m) tall. It connects the neighborhoods of Slavic Village and Kinsman.

== Planning and construction ==
The first bridge in this location was built in 1909 under the regime of Mayor Tom L. Johnson. This wooden, trestle bridge was called the Tod-Kinsman Bridge. While the Tod-Kinsman Bridge successfully connected the adjacent neighborhoods, the structure became an obstacle for the Nickel Plate Railroad traveling below.

With funding from the railroad, now owned by the Van Sweringen brothers, a new bridge was designed in 1929. Designed by Fred L. Plummer, working for Wilbur Watson & Associates, the bridge opened in 1930.

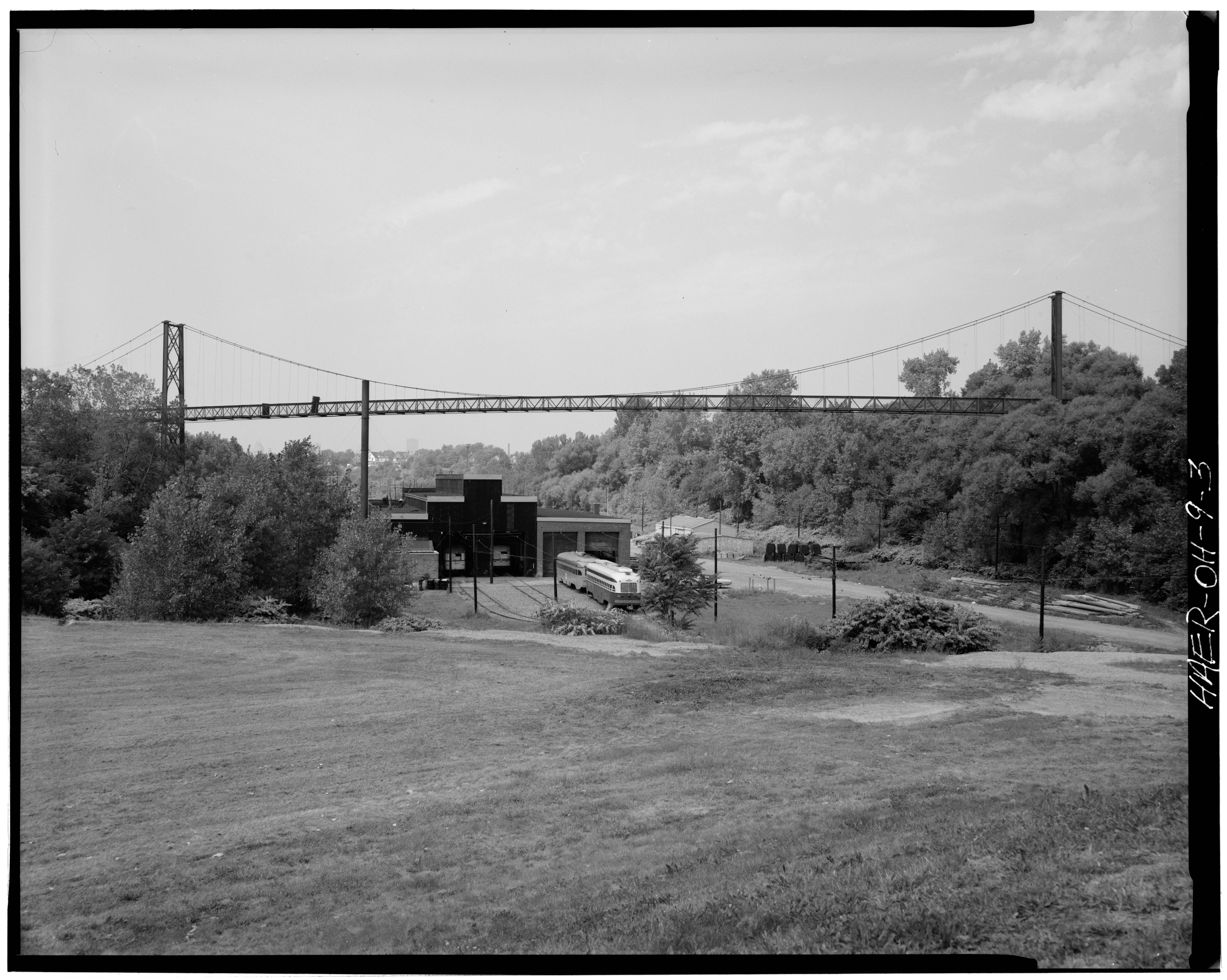
View looking north of bridge. Shaker Heights Rapid Transit line car barns visible in foreground.

== Torso murderer ==
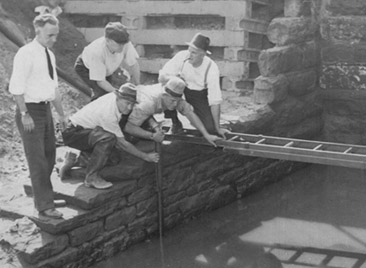
Kingsbury Run investigations, September 1936

During the Great Depression, the Kingsbury Run area became a shanty town for displaced and out-of-work people. Starting in 1934, bodies began appearing in Kingsbury Run. The serial killer responsible would become known as the Cleveland Torso Murderer. The killer was never caught, and brought increased notoriety to the area. Safety Director Eliot Ness burned the entire shanty town in an attempt to stop the murders.

== Hough riots ==
During the 1966 Hough riots, which occurred 2 miles north of the bridge, someone set fire to the bridge. No one was ever charged with the crime, but the act was widely interpreted as a racially motivated effort to separate the majority white neighborhood of Slavic Village, from majority black Kinsman.

== Closure ==
Following the vandalism in 1966, the city of Cleveland removed most of the wooden planking from the bridge and closed it to the public. It has remained closed and abandoned since. In the 1976 case Reed v. Rhodes, Judge Frank J. Battisti said in a court memorandum and order that the city of Cleveland and the school district had chosen not to repair the bridge in order to continue the neighborhood segregation and prevent black students from easily walking to the white schools on the other side of the bridge.

The bridge was listed on the National Register of Historic Places in October 2022.

== See also ==
- List of bridges documented by the Historic American Engineering Record in Ohio
