= Wayne Township, Monroe County, Ohio =

Township in Ohio, US

- Township
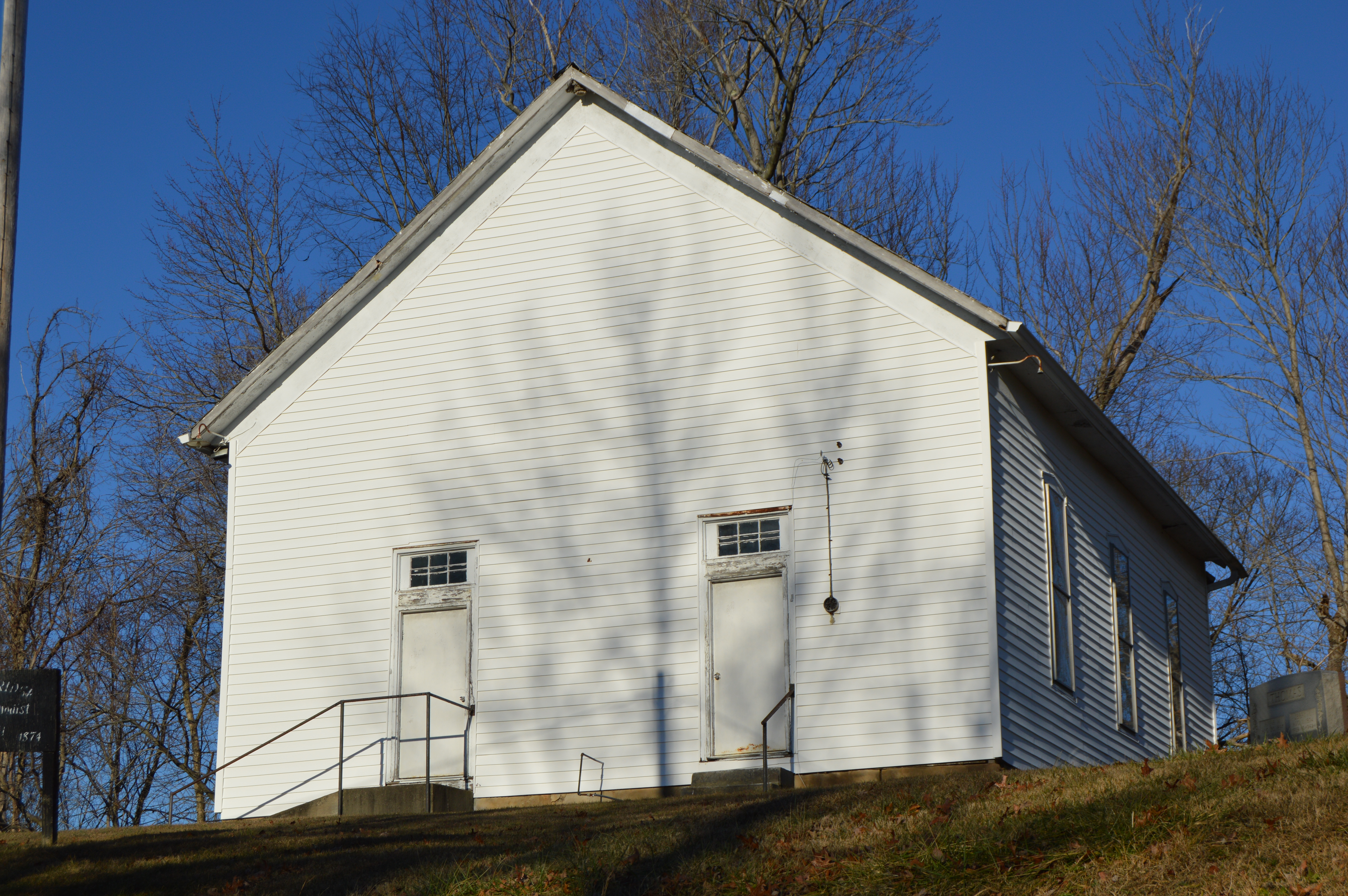
- Former Methodist church on Conner Ridge Road

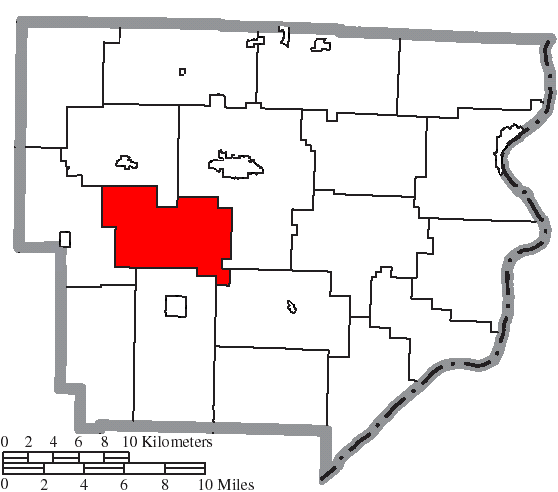
- Location of Wayne Township in Monroe County
- Coordinates: 39°42′38″N 81°11′30″W
- Country: United States
- State: Ohio
- County: Monroe

Area
  - Total: 22.4 sq mi (58.1 km^{2})
  - Land: 22.4 sq mi (58.1 km^{2})
  - Water: 0 sq mi (0.0 km^{2})
- Elevation: 1,125 ft (343 m)

Population (2020)
  - Total: 336
  - Density: 15.0/sq mi (5.78/km^{2})
- Time zone: UTC-5 (Eastern (EST))
  - Summer (DST): UTC-4 (EDT)
- FIPS code: 39-82208
- GNIS feature ID: 1086663

Wayne Township is one of the eighteen townships of Monroe County, Ohio, United States. As of the 2020 census, the population was 336.

== Geography ==
Located in the western part of the county, it borders the following townships:

- Summit Township - north
- Center Township - east
- Perry Township - southeast
- Washington Township - south
- Franklin Township - west

No municipalities are located in Wayne Township.

== Name and history ==
It is one of twenty Wayne Townships statewide.

== Government ==
The township is governed by a three-member board of trustees, who are elected in November of odd-numbered years to a four-year term beginning on the following January 1. Two are elected in the year after the presidential election and one is elected in the year before it. There is also an elected township fiscal officer, who serves a four-year term beginning on April 1 of the year after the election, which is held in November of the year before the presidential election. Vacancies in the fiscal officership or on the board of trustees are filled by the remaining trustees.
