= Moss Run (Little Muskingum River tributary) =

Stream in Ohio, U.S.

Coordinates: 39°27′38″N 81°19′32″W

Moss Run is a stream in the U.S. state of Ohio. It is a tributary to the Little Muskingum River.

Variant names were "Little Morse Run" and "Morse Run". The stream was named after a man with the name Morse, who produced chestnut shingles.
