= Grandview Township, Washington County, Ohio =

Township in Ohio, US

- Township
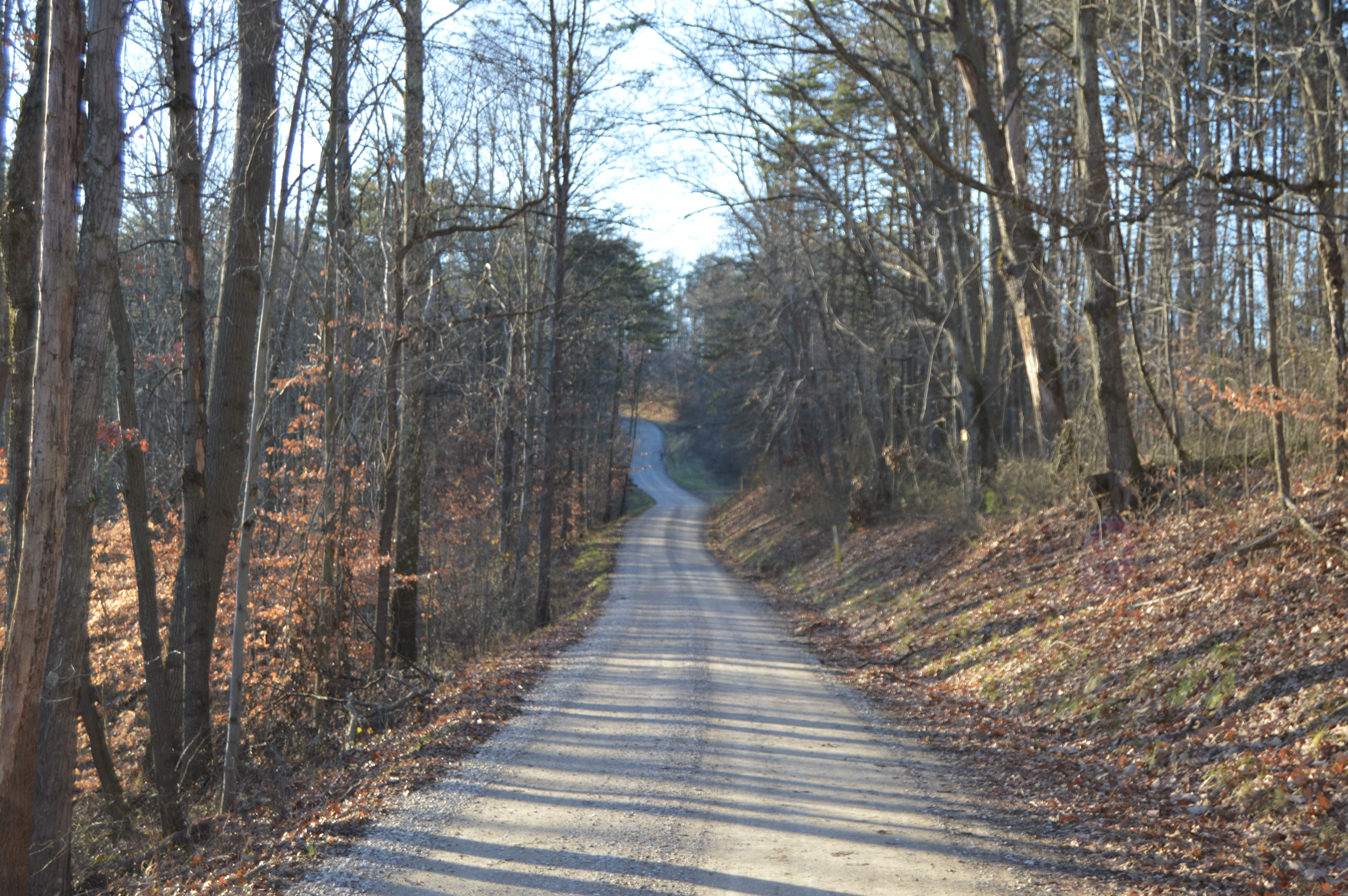
- Wiley Road near Glass

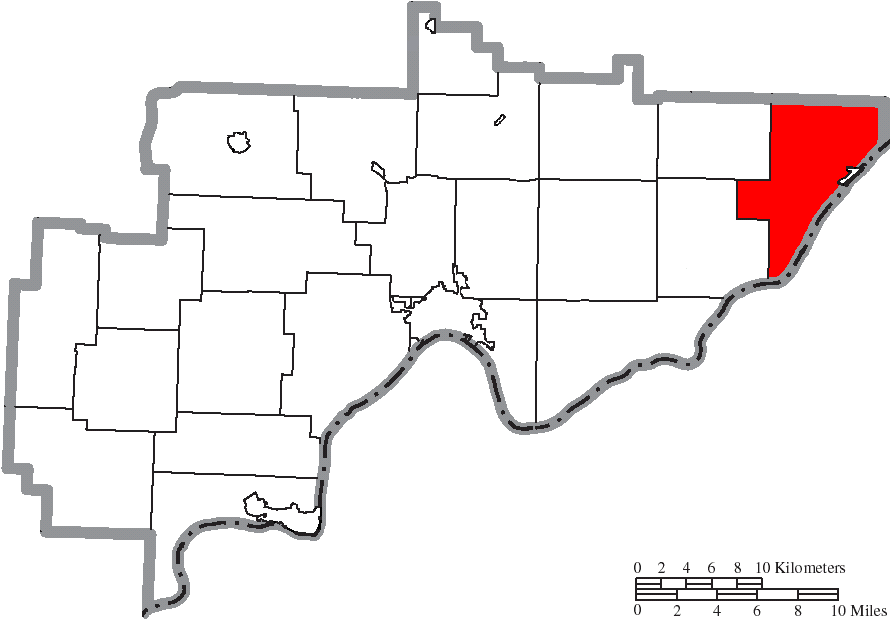
- Location of Grandview Township in Washington County
- Coordinates: 39°31′9″N 81°6′4″W
- Country: United States
- State: Ohio
- County: Washington

Area
  - Total: 35.4 sq mi (91.8 km^{2})
  - Land: 35.2 sq mi (91.1 km^{2})
  - Water: 0.27 sq mi (0.7 km^{2})
- Elevation: 920 ft (280 m)

Population (2020)
  - Total: 1,396
  - Density: 40/sq mi (15.3/km^{2})
- Time zone: UTC-5 (Eastern (EST))
  - Summer (DST): UTC-4 (EDT)
- FIPS code: 39-31276
- GNIS feature ID: 1087133

Grandview Township is one of the twenty-two townships of Washington County, Ohio, United States. The 2020 census found 1,396 people in the township.

== Geography ==
Located in the eastern corner of the county along the Ohio River, it borders the following townships:

- Benton Township, Monroe County - north
- Jackson Township, Monroe County - northeast
- Independence Township - southwest
- Ludlow Township - west
- Washington Township, Monroe County - northwest corner

West Virginia lies across the Ohio River to the southeast: Pleasants County in the far south, and Tyler County otherwise.

The village of Matamoras is located in the eastern part of the township along the Ohio River.

== Name and history ==
It is the only Grandview Township statewide.

== Government ==
The township is governed by a three-member board of trustees, who are elected in November of odd-numbered years to a four-year term beginning on the following January 1. Two are elected in the year after the presidential election and one is elected in the year before it. There is also an elected township fiscal officer, who serves a four-year term beginning on April 1 of the year after the election, which is held in November of the year before the presidential election. Vacancies in the fiscal officership or on the board of trustees are filled by the remaining trustees.
