= Benton Township, Monroe County, Ohio =

Township in Ohio, US

- Township
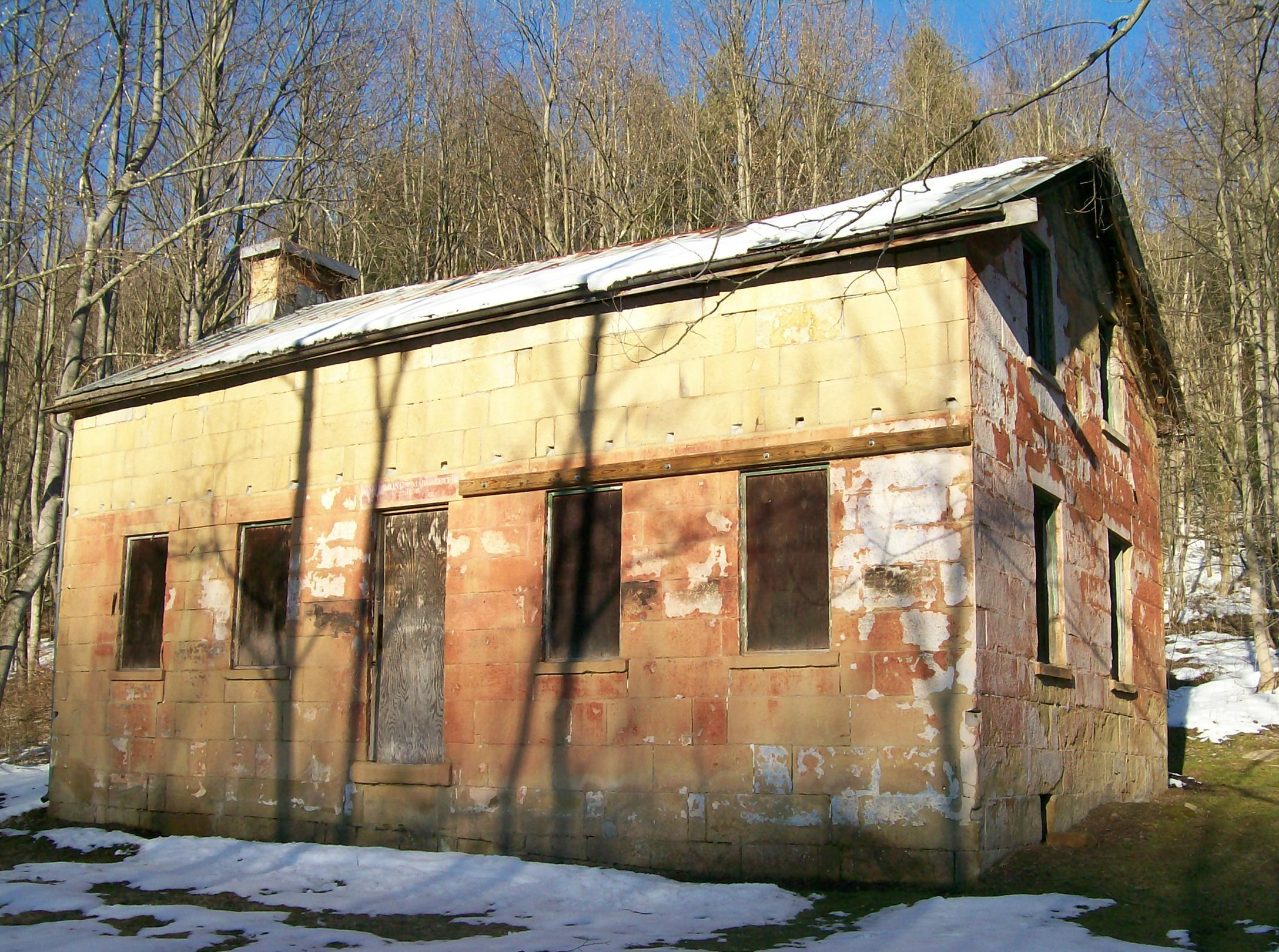
- Walter Ring House in the Wayne National Forest

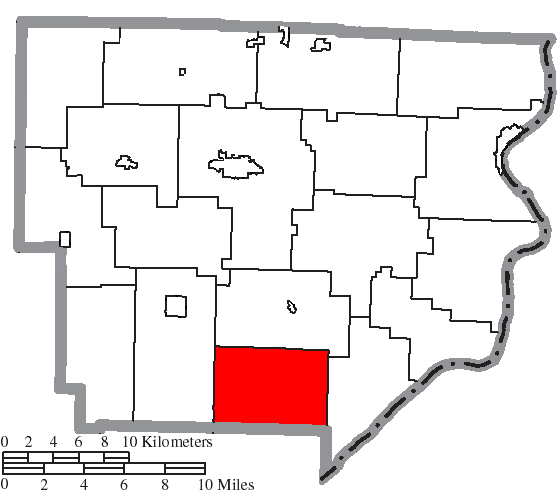
- Location of Benton Township in Monroe County
- Coordinates: 39°36′26″N 81°5′8″W
- Country: United States
- State: Ohio
- County: Monroe

Area
  - Total: 22.6 sq mi (58.5 km^{2})
  - Land: 22.6 sq mi (58.5 km^{2})
  - Water: 0 sq mi (0.0 km^{2})
- Elevation: 980 ft (300 m)

Population (2020)
  - Total: 298
  - Density: 13.2/sq mi (5.09/km^{2})
- Time zone: UTC-5 (Eastern (EST))
  - Summer (DST): UTC-4 (EDT)
- FIPS code: 39-05606
- GNIS feature ID: 1086647

Benton Township is one of the eighteen townships of Monroe County, Ohio, United States. As of the 2020 census, the population was 298.

== Geography ==
Located in the southern part of the county, it borders the following townships:

- Perry Township - north
- Jackson Township - east
- Grandview Township, Washington County - south
- Ludlow Township, Washington County - southwest corner
- Washington Township - west

No municipalities are located in Benton Township.

== Name and history ==
Statewide, other Benton Townships are located in Hocking, Ottawa, Paulding, and Pike counties.

== Government ==
The township is governed by a three-member board of trustees, who are elected in November of odd-numbered years to a four-year term beginning on the following January 1. Two are elected in the year after the presidential election and one is elected in the year before it. There is also an elected township fiscal officer, who serves a four-year term beginning on April 1 of the year after the election, which is held in November of the year before the presidential election. Vacancies in the fiscal officership or on the board of trustees are filled by the remaining trustees.
