= Ludlow Township, Ohio =

Township in Ohio, US

Ludlow Township, Washington County, Ohio
- Township
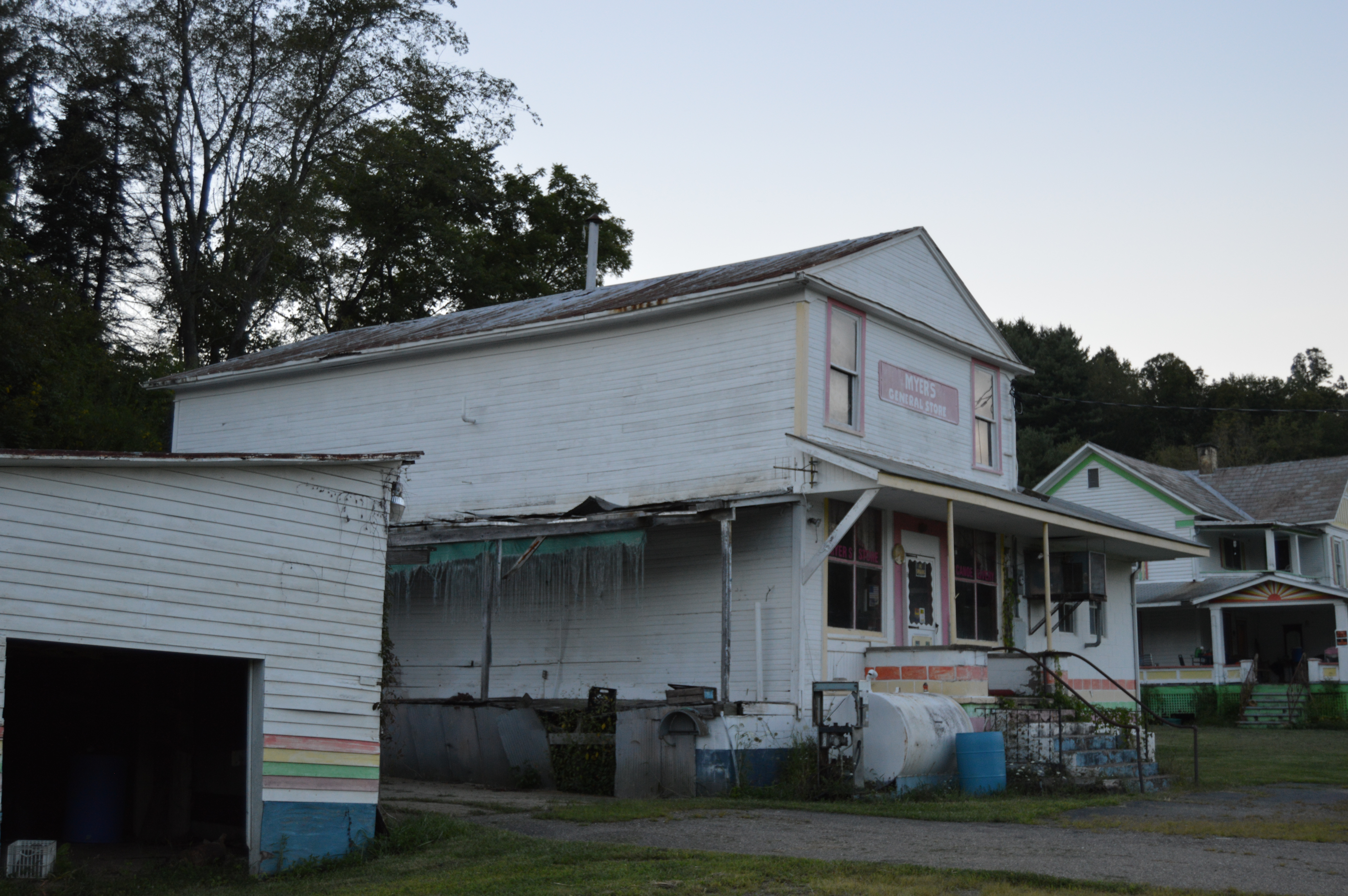
- General store at Wingett Run

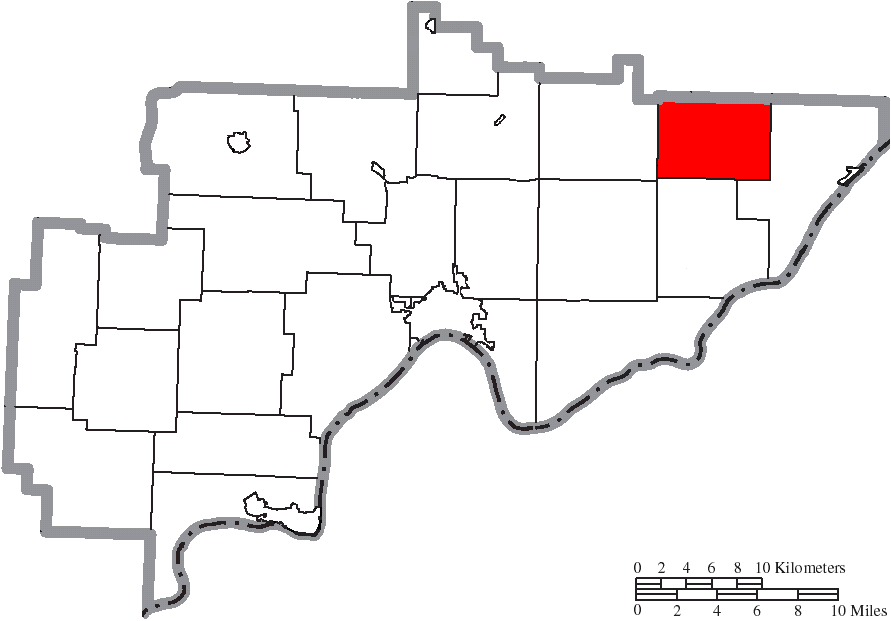
- Location of Ludlow Township in Washington County
- Coordinates: 39°32′40″N 81°11′48″W
- Country: United States
- State: Ohio
- County: Washington

Area
  - Total: 22.5 sq mi (58.2 km^{2})
  - Land: 22.5 sq mi (58.2 km^{2})
  - Water: 0 sq mi (0.0 km^{2})
- Elevation: 640 ft (195 m)

Population (2020)
  - Total: 289
  - Density: 12.9/sq mi (4.97/km^{2})
- Time zone: UTC-5 (Eastern (EST))
  - Summer (DST): UTC-4 (EDT)
- FIPS code: 39-45360
- GNIS feature ID: 1087137

Ludlow Township is one of the twenty-two townships of Washington County, Ohio, United States. The 2020 census found 289 people in the township.

== Geography ==
Located in the northeastern part of the county, it borders the following townships:

- Washington Township, Monroe County - north
- Benton Township, Monroe County - northeast corner
- Grandview Township - east
- Independence Township - south
- Liberty Township - west
- Bethel Township, Monroe County - northwest

No municipalities are located in Ludlow Township, although the unincorporated community of Wingett Run lies in the township's west.

== Name and history ==
It is the only Ludlow Township statewide.

== Government ==
The township is governed by a three-member board of trustees, who are elected in November of odd-numbered years to a four-year term beginning on the following January 1. Two are elected in the year after the presidential election and one is elected in the year before it. There is also an elected township fiscal officer, who serves a four-year term beginning on April 1 of the year after the election, which is held in November of the year before the presidential election. Vacancies in the fiscal officership or on the board of trustees are filled by the remaining trustees.
