= Kingsbury Run =

Area on the southeast side of Cleveland, Ohio, US

Coordinates: 41.4815°N 81.6756°W

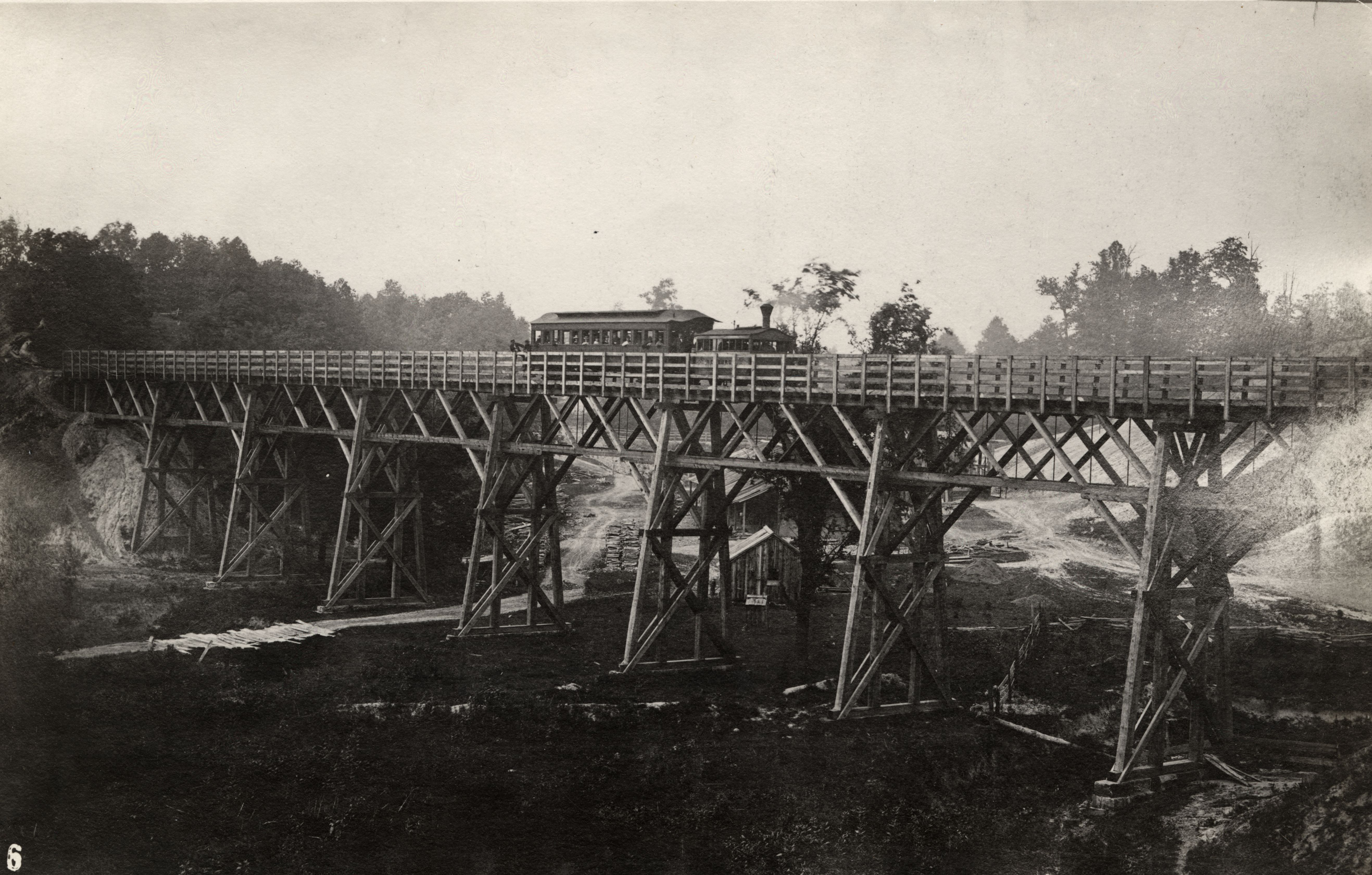
Kingsbury Run Bridge, circa 1886

Kingsbury Run is the name that refers to an area on the southeast side of Cleveland, Ohio, located near the suburb of Shaker Heights. The area stretches westward through Kinsman Road. It contained a natural watershed that ran through East 79th Street and carried storm waters into the Cuyahoga River, draining them from the areas now known as Maple Heights and Warrensville Heights. Kingsbury Run was named after James Kingsbury (1767–1847), one of the earliest settlers in the Western Reserve, who became the first inhabitant of Newburgh in 1797. It is also the route through which the RTA Rapid Transit travels on its way to Public Square in downtown Cleveland.

Kingsbury Run became notorious in the mid-1930s when an unidentified serial killer, the Cleveland Torso Murderer, used the area as a dumping ground for the dismembered remains of some of their first victims. In 1938, Eliot Ness directed police to raid the area. They evicted 300 individuals from the area and burned down approximately 100 shanty homes in a desperate attempt to weed out the killer.

== Sidaway Bridge ==
Sidaway Bridge
- Coordinates: 41.479988, -81.642788

History
- Construction start: 1929
- Construction end: 1930
- Closed: 1966

Between Sidaway Avenue and East 65th Street the Kingsbury Run ravine is spanned by the Sidaway Bridge, Cleveland's first and only suspension span, a footbridge which connects the Jackowo and Kinsman Road neighborhoods. Due to damage caused during the Hough riots, the bridge was closed in 1966 and remains inaccessible. Continued closure of the bridge influenced Frank J. Battisti's ruling in the case Robert Anthony Reed III v. Rhodes regarding desegregation in the Cleveland schools.

== See also ==
- List of rivers of Ohio
