= Graysville, Ohio =

- Village
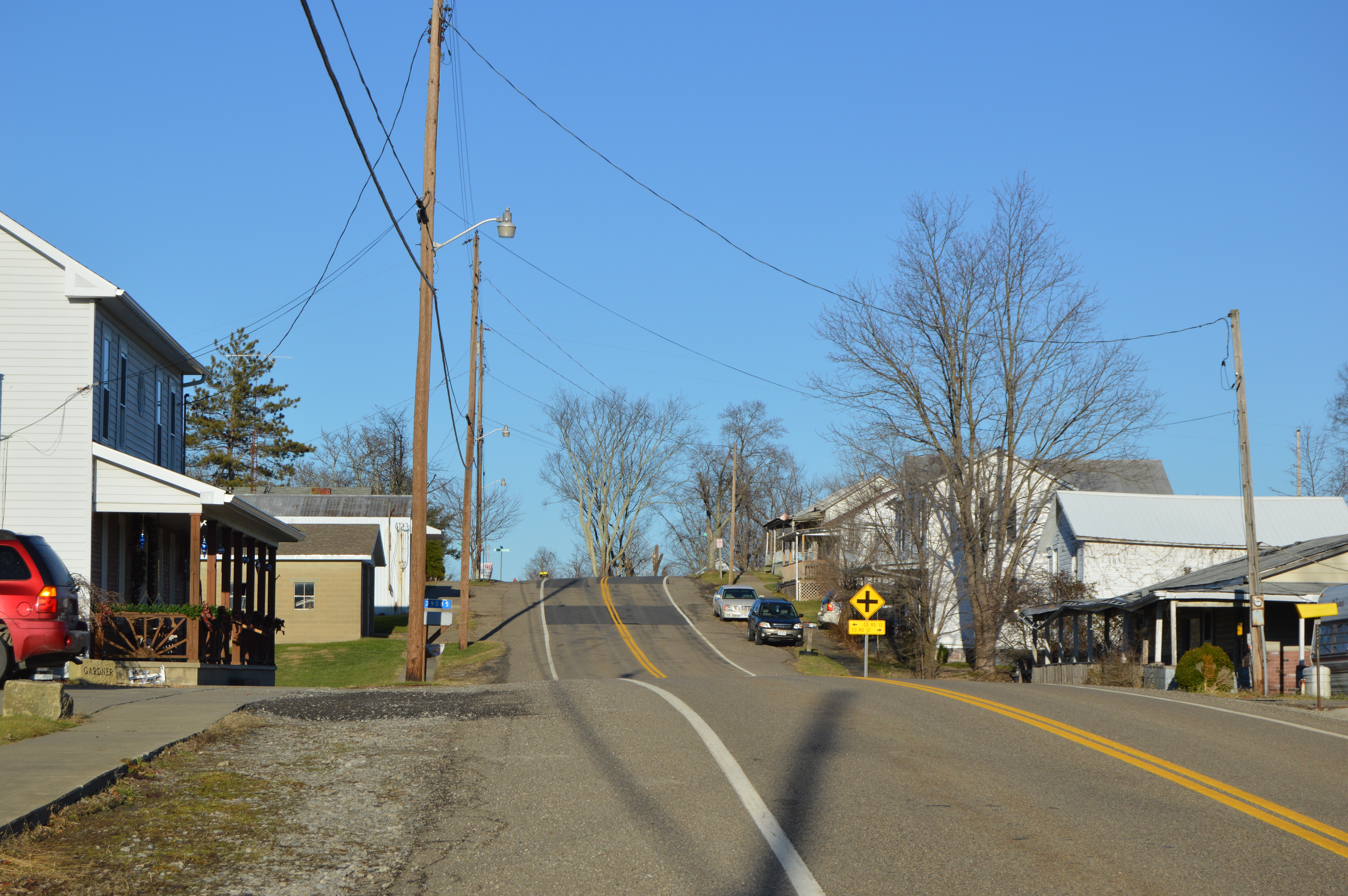
- State Route 26, the main street

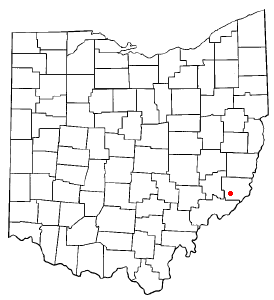
- Location of Graysville, Ohio

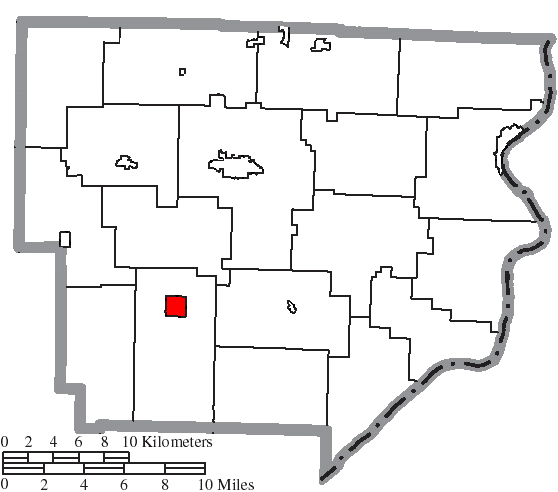
- Location of Graysville in Monroe County
- Coordinates: 39°39′48″N 81°10′29″W
- Country: United States
- State: Ohio
- County: Monroe
- Township: Washington

Area
  - Total: 1.01 sq mi (2.61 km^{2})
  - Land: 1.01 sq mi (2.61 km^{2})
  - Water: 0 sq mi (0.00 km^{2})
- Elevation: 1,053 ft (321 m)

Population (2020)
  - Total: 70
  - Estimate (2023): 68
  - Density: 69.5/sq mi (26.84/km^{2})
- Time zone: UTC-5 (Eastern (EST))
  - Summer (DST): UTC-4 (EDT)
- ZIP code: 45734
- Area code: 740
- FIPS code: 39-31542
- GNIS feature ID: 2398199

Graysville is a village in Monroe County, Ohio, United States. The population was 70 at the 2020 census.

== Geography ==
According to the United States Census Bureau, the village has a total area of 1.01 square miles (2.62 km^{2}), all of it land.

== Demographics ==
Historical population
Census	Pop.	Note	%±
1870	199		—
1880	174		−12.6%
1890	107		−38.5%
1900	174		62.6%
1910	166		−4.6%
1920	187		12.7%
1930	192		2.7%
1940	170		−11.5%
1950	138		−18.8%
1960	127		−8.0%
1970	97		−23.6%
1980	112		15.5%
1990	89		−20.5%
2000	113		27.0%
2010	76		−32.7%
2020	70		−7.9%
2023 (est.)	68	▼	−2.9%
U.S. Decennial Census

=== 2010 census ===
As of the census of 2010, there were 76 people, 34 households, and 25 families living in the village. The population density was 75.2 inhabitants per square mile (29.0/km^{2}). There were 38 housing units at an average density of 37.6 per square mile (14.5/km^{2}). The racial makeup of the village was 89.5% White and 10.5% from two or more races.

There were 34 households, of which 23.5% had children under the age of 18 living with them, 58.8% were married couples living together, 8.8% had a female householder with no husband present, 5.9% had a male householder with no wife present, and 26.5% were non-families. 26.5% of all households were made up of individuals, and 11.8% had someone living alone who was 65 years of age or older. The average household size was 2.24 and the average family size was 2.64.

The median age in the village was 48 years. 18.4% of residents were under the age of 18; 3.8% were between the ages of 18 and 24; 22.4% were from 25 to 44; 39.4% were from 45 to 64; and 15.8% were 65 years of age or older. The gender makeup of the village was 50.0% male and 50.0% female.

=== 2000 census ===
As of the census of 2000, there were 113 people, 41 households, and 33 families living in the village. The population density was 113.4 inhabitants per square mile (43.8/km^{2}). There were 45 housing units at an average density of 45.2 per square mile (17.5/km^{2}). The racial makeup of the village was 100.00% White. Hispanic or Latino of any race were 1.77% of the population.

There were 41 households, out of which 34.1% had children under the age of 18 living with them, 70.7% were married couples living together, 4.9% had a female householder with no husband present, and 19.5% were non-families. 14.6% of all households were made up of individuals, and 7.3% had someone living alone who was 65 years of age or older. The average household size was 2.76 and the average family size was 2.97.

In the village, the population was spread out, with 30.1% under the age of 18, 6.2% from 18 to 24, 26.5% from 25 to 44, 17.7% from 45 to 64, and 19.5% who were 65 years of age or older. The median age was 36 years. For every 100 females there were 109.3 males. For every 100 females age 18 and over, there were 97.5 males.

The median income for a household in the village was $24,286, and the median income for a family was $24,643. Males had a median income of $32,000 versus $20,000 for females. The per capita income for the village was $9,810. There were 13.9% of families and 28.8% of the population living below the poverty line, including 38.0% of under eighteens and 10.5% of those over 64.
