= Rinard Mills, Ohio =

- Unincorporated community
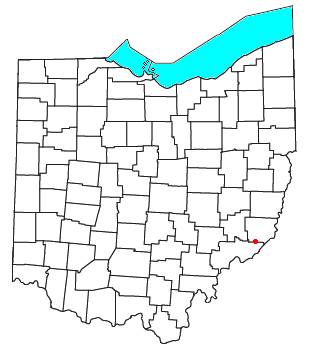
- Location of Rinard Mills, Ohio
- Coordinates: 39°35′05″N 81°09′18″W
- Country: United States
- State: Ohio
- County: Monroe
- Elevation: 686 ft (209 m)
- Time zone: UTC-5 (Eastern (EST))
  - Summer (DST): UTC-4 (EDT)
- Area codes: 740 & 220
- GNIS feature ID: 1065545

Rinard Mills (/ˈraɪnərd ˈmɪlz/ RY-nərd MILZ) is a small unincorporated community on the Little Muskingum River in southwestern Washington Township, Monroe County, Ohio, United States. It is named after Isaac Rinard, who owned a mill at the village. The village is situated on State Route 26 between Marietta (county seat of Washington County) and Woodsfield (county seat of Monroe County). The village has a cemetery. Several years ago, a resident of the community found the remains of a mill stone in the Little Muskingum. It was incorporated into Isaac Rinard's grave marker and was cause for a special event.
