= Little Muskingum River =

Coordinates: 39.3770°N 81.4018°W

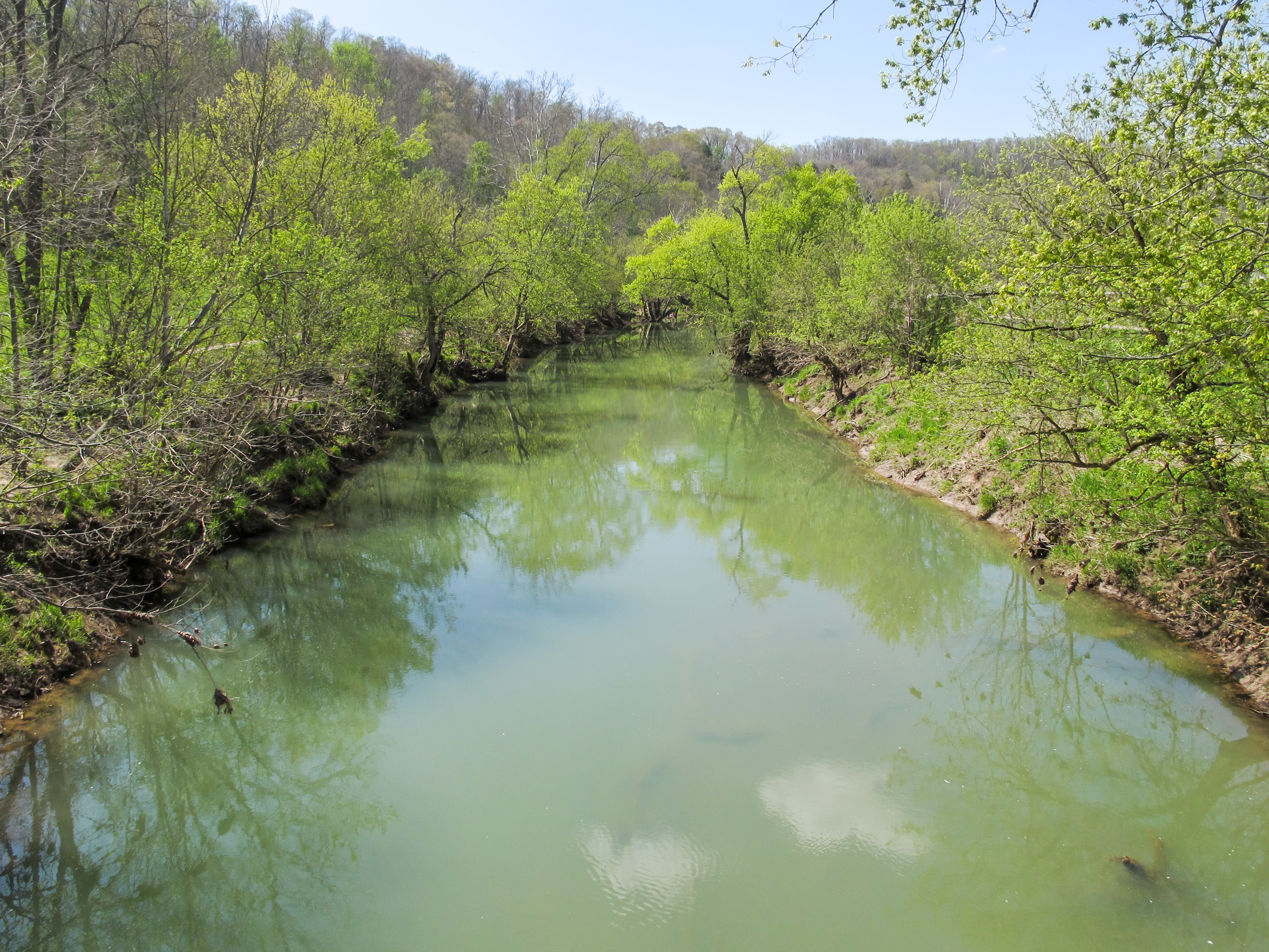
- The Little Muskingum River viewed from the Rinard Covered Bridge

Location
- Country: United States
- State: Ohio

Physical characteristics
- Source
  - location: Monroe County, Ohio
- Mouth
  - location: Ohio River near Reno, Ohio
  - elevation: 582 ft (177 m)
- Length: 65 mi (105 km)
- Basin size: 315 mi^{2} (820 km^{2})

The Little Muskingum River is a tributary of the Ohio River, approximately 65 mi (105 km) long, in southeast Ohio in the United States.

It rises in the hill country of Monroe County, approximately 5 mi (8 km) northwest of the Ohio River and 8 mi (13 km) southeast of Woodsfield. It flows southwest, in a tight meandering course, roughly parallel to, and staying within 8 mi (13 km) of the Ohio. It passes Rinard Mills and Dart, and joins the Ohio approximately 5 mi (8 km) southeast of Marietta, Ohio and the mouth of the Muskingum River, which enters the Ohio from the northwest. Duck Creek enters the Ohio between the mouth of the Muskingum and Little Muskingum.

All except the last 2 mi (3.2 km) of the river are within Wayne National Forest.

== See also ==
- List of rivers of Ohio
- Sacket Run, tributary of Little Muskingum River
