= Riverdale Road Covered Bridge =

Riverdale Road Bridge
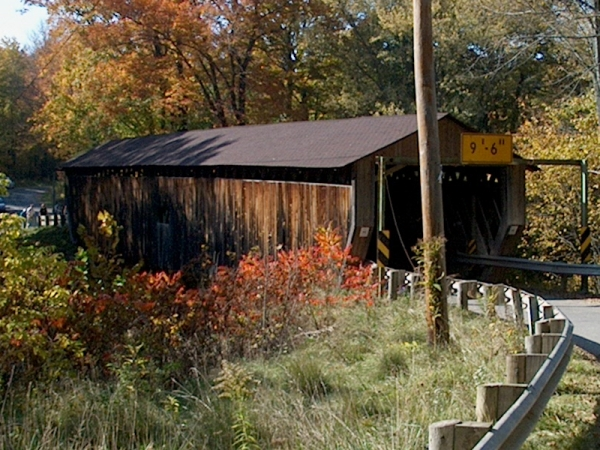
- Coordinates: 41°40′24″N 80°52′19″W
- Locale: Ashtabula County, Ohio, United States

Characteristics
- Design: single span, Town truss
- Total length: 140 feet (42.7 m)

History
- Construction start: 1874

Riverdale Road Bridge is a covered bridge spanning the Grand River in Morgan Township, Ashtabula County, Ohio, United States. The bridge, one of currently 16 drivable bridges in Ashtabula county, is a single span Town truss design. During its renovation in 1981, the floor was rebuilt and glue-laminated wood girders were added. Previously, center steel bracing had been replaced under the bridge in 1945. In 1987, a new concrete abutment for additional support was added after the road at the east end of the bridge washed out. The bridge’s WGCB number is 35-04-22, and it is located approximately 1.1 mi (1.8 km) north-northwest of Rock Creek.

== History ==
- 1874 – Bridge constructed
- 1945 – Center steel bracing replaced
- 1981 – Bridge renovated
- 1987 – Concrete abutment added at west end after road washed out

== Dimensions ==
- Span: 111 feet (34 m)
- Length: 140 feet (43 m)
- Width: 12 feet 6 inches (3.81 m)
- Height: 10 feet 6 inches (3.20 m)
- Overhead clearance: 9 feet 6 inches (2.90 m)

== Gallery ==
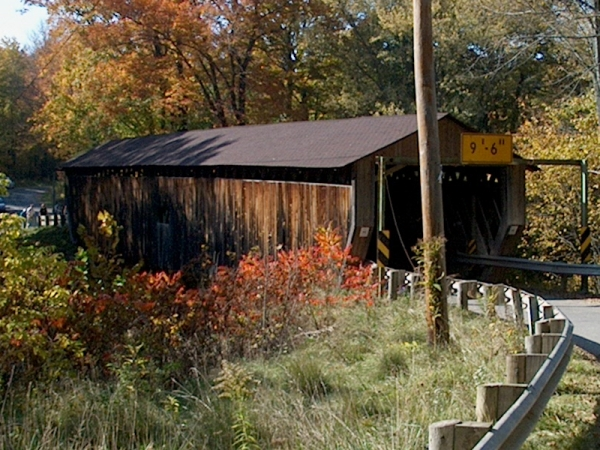
View from the southeast

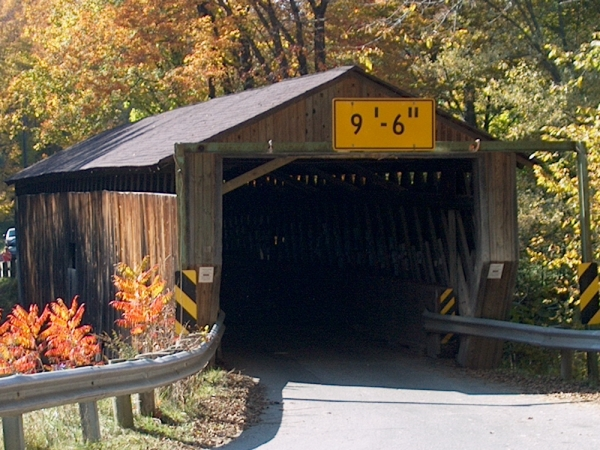
East approach

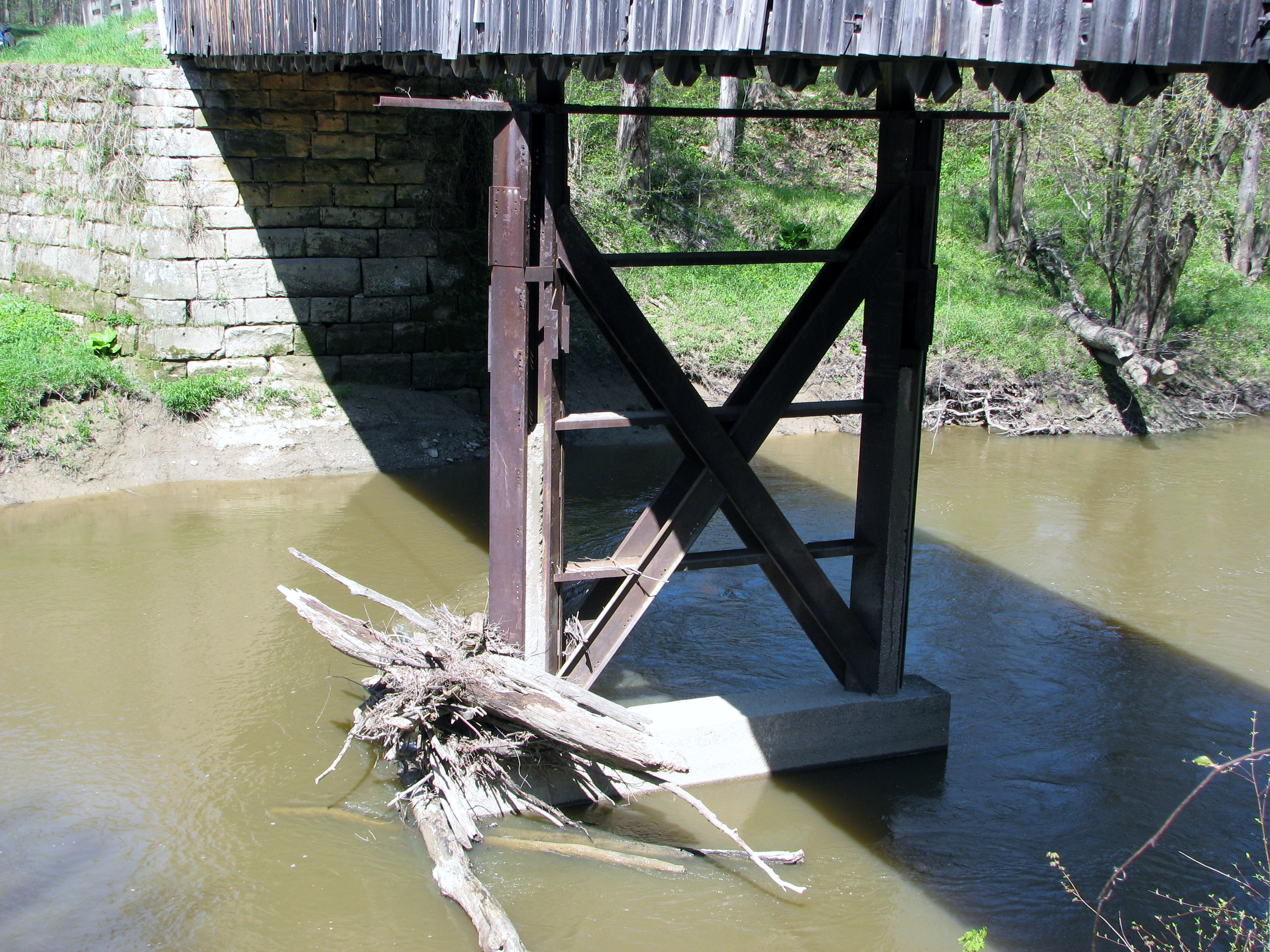
View from underneath the bridge

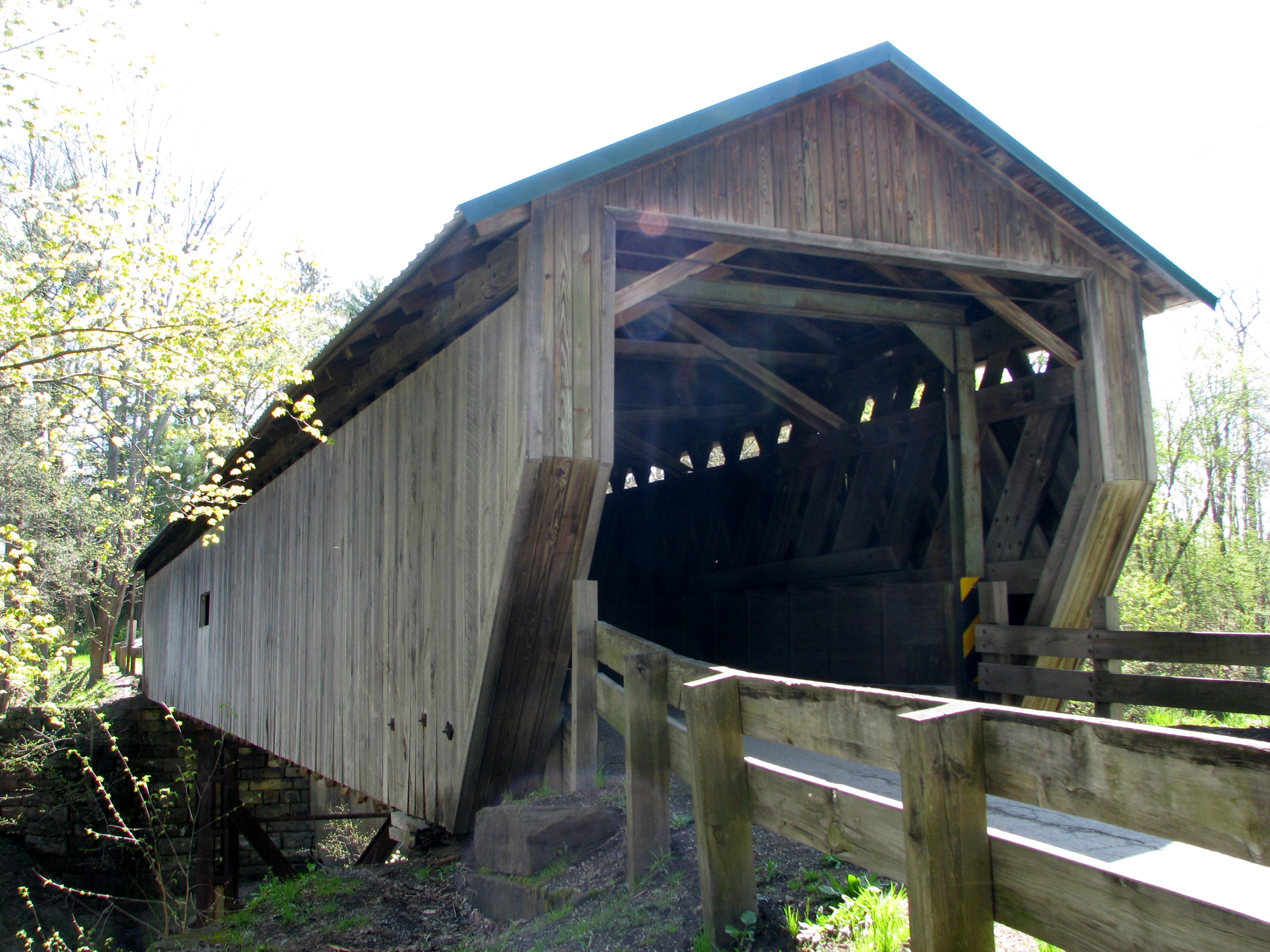

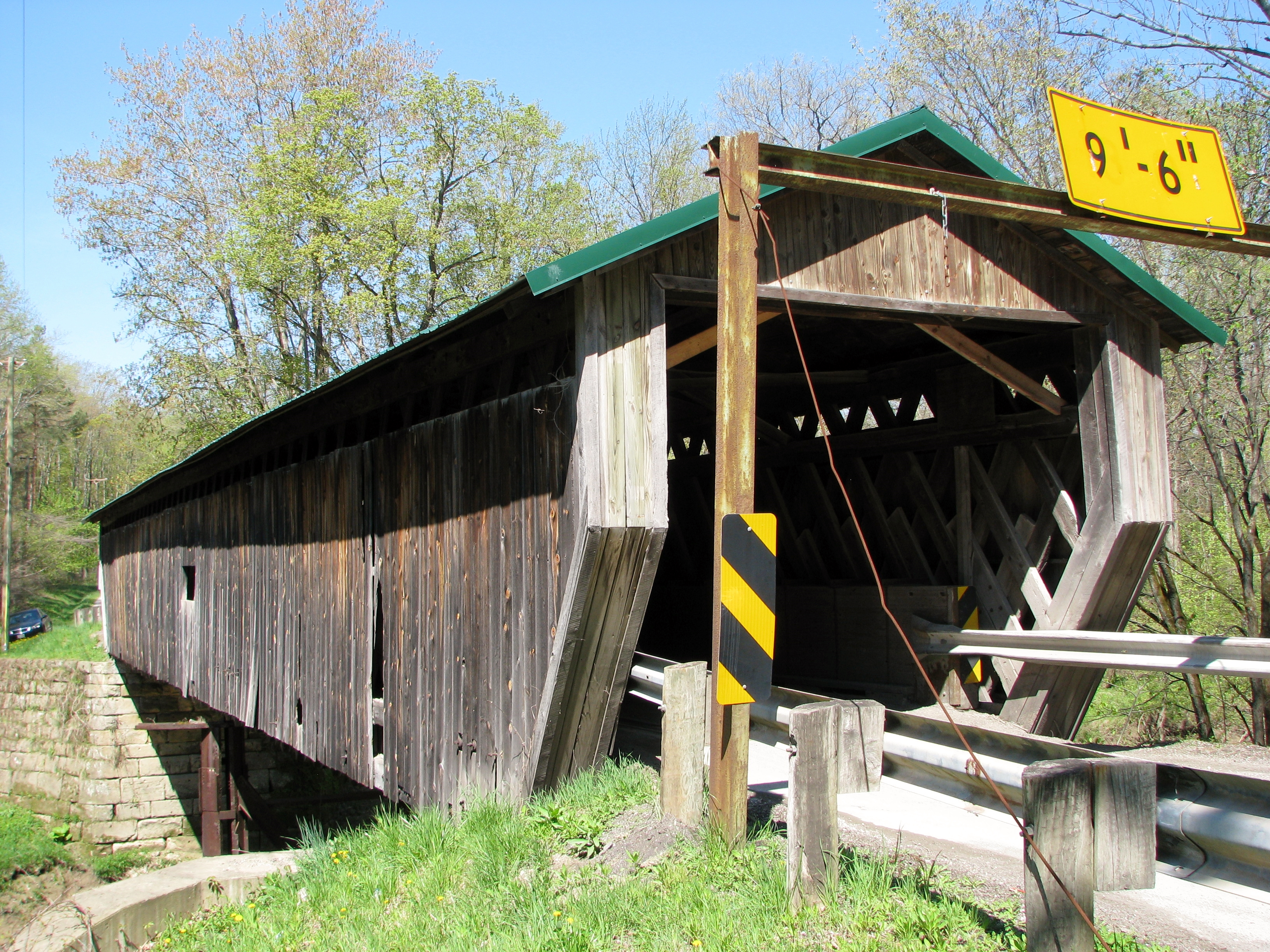

== See also ==
- List of Ashtabula County covered bridges
