= List of covered bridges in Ashtabula County, Ohio =

Ashtabula County, Ohio

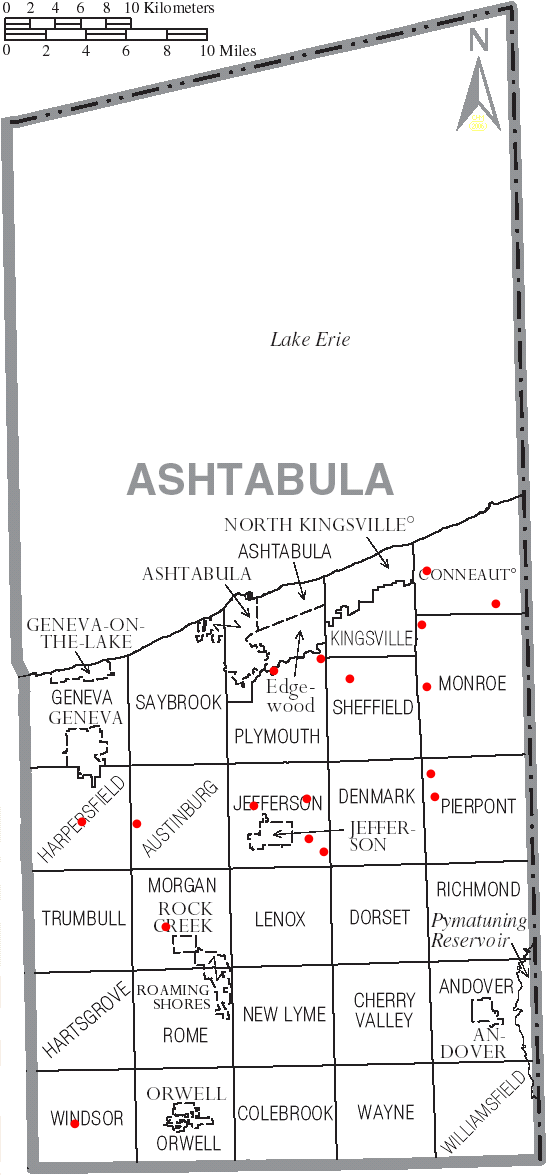
Map of the 17 covered bridges as of October 2008

The following is a list of covered bridges in Ashtabula County, Ohio, United States. Ashtabula County has the most public covered bridges – currently 19 – of any county in Ohio, with six having been newly constructed since 1983. Self-driven tours of the bridges can be had any time of the year by following signs posted in the county.

== Existing bridges ==
=== Public, drivable covered bridges ===
Crossing	Built	Coordinates
Benetka Road Covered Bridge	c. 1900	41°50′55.10″N 80°41′21.95″W
Caine Road Covered Bridge	1986	41°45′53.46″N 80°37′3.65″W
Creek Road Covered Bridge	1994	41°55′10.88″N 80°36′34.81″W
Doyle Road Covered Bridge	1868	41°45′43.63″N 80°47′24.61″W
Giddings Road Covered Bridge	1995	41°45′53.42″N 80°43′57.36″W
Harpersfield Covered Bridge	1868	41°45.379′N 80°56.656′W
Mechanicsville Road Covered Bridge	1867	41°45′16.63″N 80°53′52.58″W
Middle Road Covered Bridge	1868	41°54′7.49″N 80°32′49.09″W
Netcher Road Covered Bridge	1998	41°44′13.42″N 80°43′54.08″W
Olin's Covered Bridge	1873	41°51′45.65″N 80°43′15.20″W
Riverdale Road Covered Bridge	1874	41°40′23.81″N 80°52′18.66″W
Root Road Covered Bridge	1868	41°50′0.03″N 80°37′12.28″W
South Denmark Road Covered Bridge	1895	41°43′1.96″N 80°41′25.33″W
Smolen–Gulf Bridge	2008	41°51′19.58″N 80°45′43.74″W
State Road Covered Bridge	1983	41°53′11.4″N 80°37′14.41″W
West Liberty Covered Bridge	2011	41°47′56.94″N 80°56′54.6″W
Windsor Mills Covered Bridge	1867	41°31′59.45″N 80°57′50.11″W

=== Pedestrian bridges ===
Crossing	Built	Coordinates
Riverview Covered Bridge	2016	41.8554390°N 80.7621500°W

=== Former and other bridges ===
- Graham Road Bridge
- The South Ridge Road Covered Bridge spanned the Conneaut Creek in Kingsville.
- In Kellogsville there were four covered bridges over the Ashtabula River within four miles of each other.
- The Pierpont Covered Bridge was north of Pierpont on State Route 7.
- The Callender Road Covered Bridge, lost in the Great Flood of 1913, spanned the Grand River near Rock Creek.
- The Muller Covered Bridge in Jefferson.
- A two-lane covered bridge was located on State Route 45 in Rock Creek; after a century it was replaced in 1948.
- The Old Route 7 Covered Bridge, over the Conneaut Creek in what is now Conneaut was built in 1867 and replaced in 1925.
- The Twin Covered Bridges of Farnham spanned the Conneaut Creek in what is now Conneaut.
- The Kelloggsville Covered Bridge spanned the Ashtabula River south of Kelloggsville.
- The Prim's Sawmill Covered Bridge.
- The Forman Road Covered Bridge in Eagleville (near Austinburg) is now part of Covered Bridge Pizza in North Kingsville and Andover; In 1974, the 123-ft. Town lattice structure, which had been built in 1862 was sold for $5.00, cut in half, dismantled, and reassembled in the two locations.
- The Fobes Road Covered Bridge or Shaunghum Covered Bridge was a 118-foot Town lattice structure that carried Fobes Road over the Grand River in Ashtabula County, Ohio. Built in 1911, the bridge was unique in that it was built without abutments, but rather sat on wooden pilings. In the 1960s a runaway truck struck the south portal of the bridge, causing severe damage that forced the bridge's permanent closure. In May 1971, the bridge was deliberately burned by Ashtabula County officials. WGCB No. 35-04-21.
- The Furnace Road Covered Bridge spanned Conneaut Creek in Conneaut.
- The Crooked Gulf Covered Bridge was the first one to span the Ashtabula River.
- The Wayne Township Covered Bridge was on U.S. Route 322.
- The South Windsor or Old Plank Road Covered Bridge carried South Windsor Road across the Grand River in Windsor Township, Ashtabula County Ohio. Built in 1870, the 90-foot Town lattice structure was destroyed by fire on the night of October 2, 1970. The fire was determined to be an act of arson, during which the perpetrator(s) piled tires within the bridge and set them afire. WGCB No. 35-04-26.

Ashtabula County has had 62 covered bridges.

== See also ==
- List of covered bridges in Ohio
