= South Denmark Road Covered Bridge =

South Denmark Road Bridge
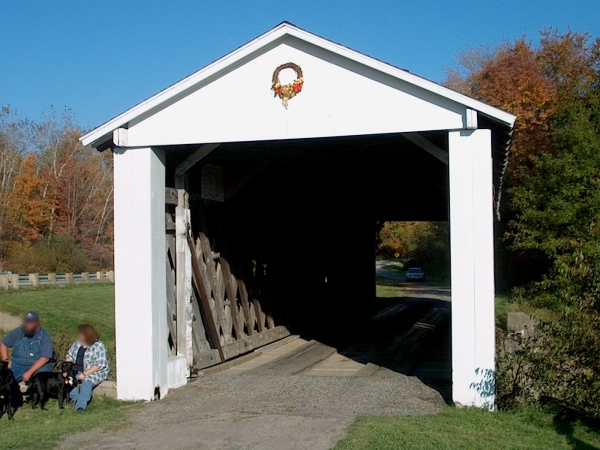
- Coordinates: 41°43′03″N 80°41′25″W
- Locale: Ashtabula County, Ohio, United States

Characteristics
- Design: single span, Town truss
- Total length: 100 feet (30.5 m)

History
- Construction start: 1895

South Denmark Road Bridge is a covered bridge spanning Mill Creek in Denmark Township, Ashtabula County, Ohio, United States. The bridge, one of currently 16 drivable bridges in the county, is a single span Town truss design. Bypassed in 1975, the bridge still remains open to light traffic. The bridge’s WGCB number is 35-04-14, and it is located approximately 4.4 mi (7.1 km) east-southeast of Jefferson.

== History ==
- 1895 – Bridge constructed.
- 1975 – Bridge bypassed.

== Dimensions ==
- Span: 76 feet (23 m)
- Length: 100 feet (30 m)
- Width: 13 feet 3 inches (4.04 m)
- Height: 11 feet (3.4 m)

== Gallery ==
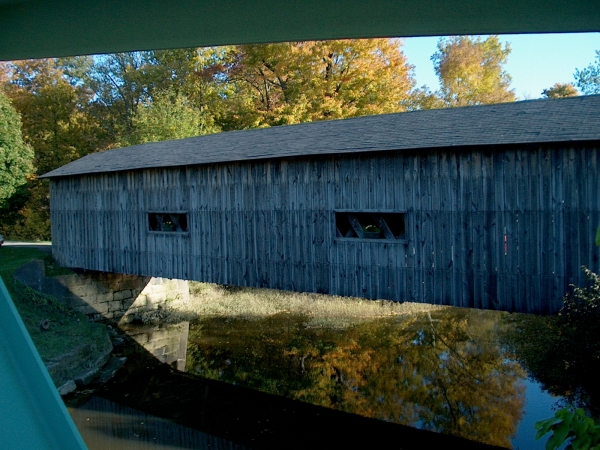
View from the north

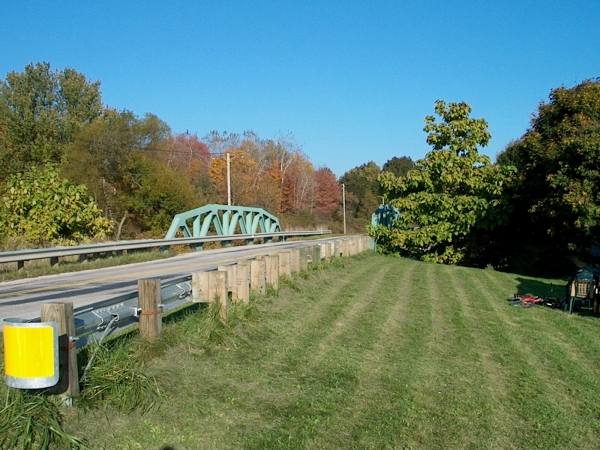
Steel span on relocated road

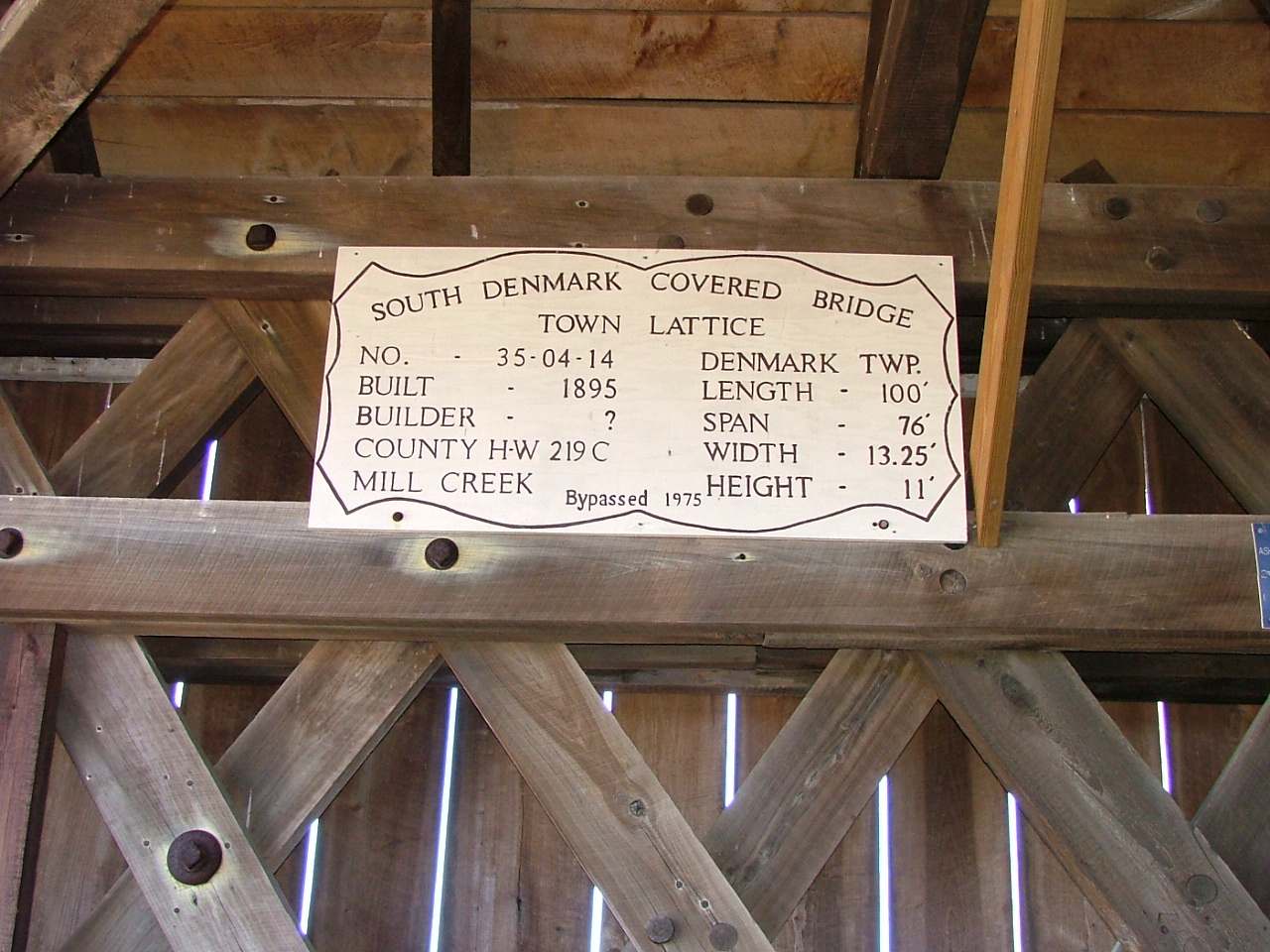
Build placard

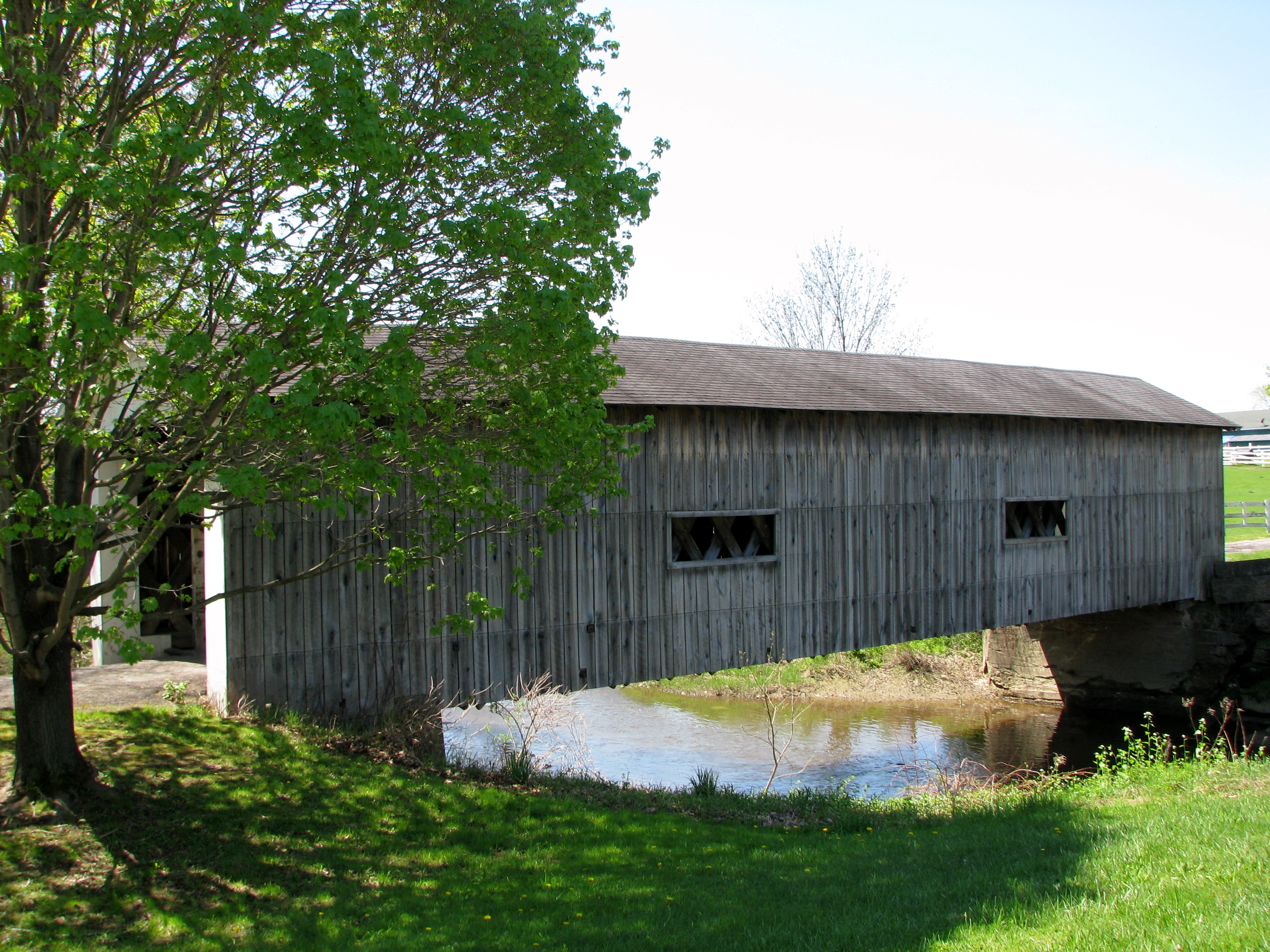

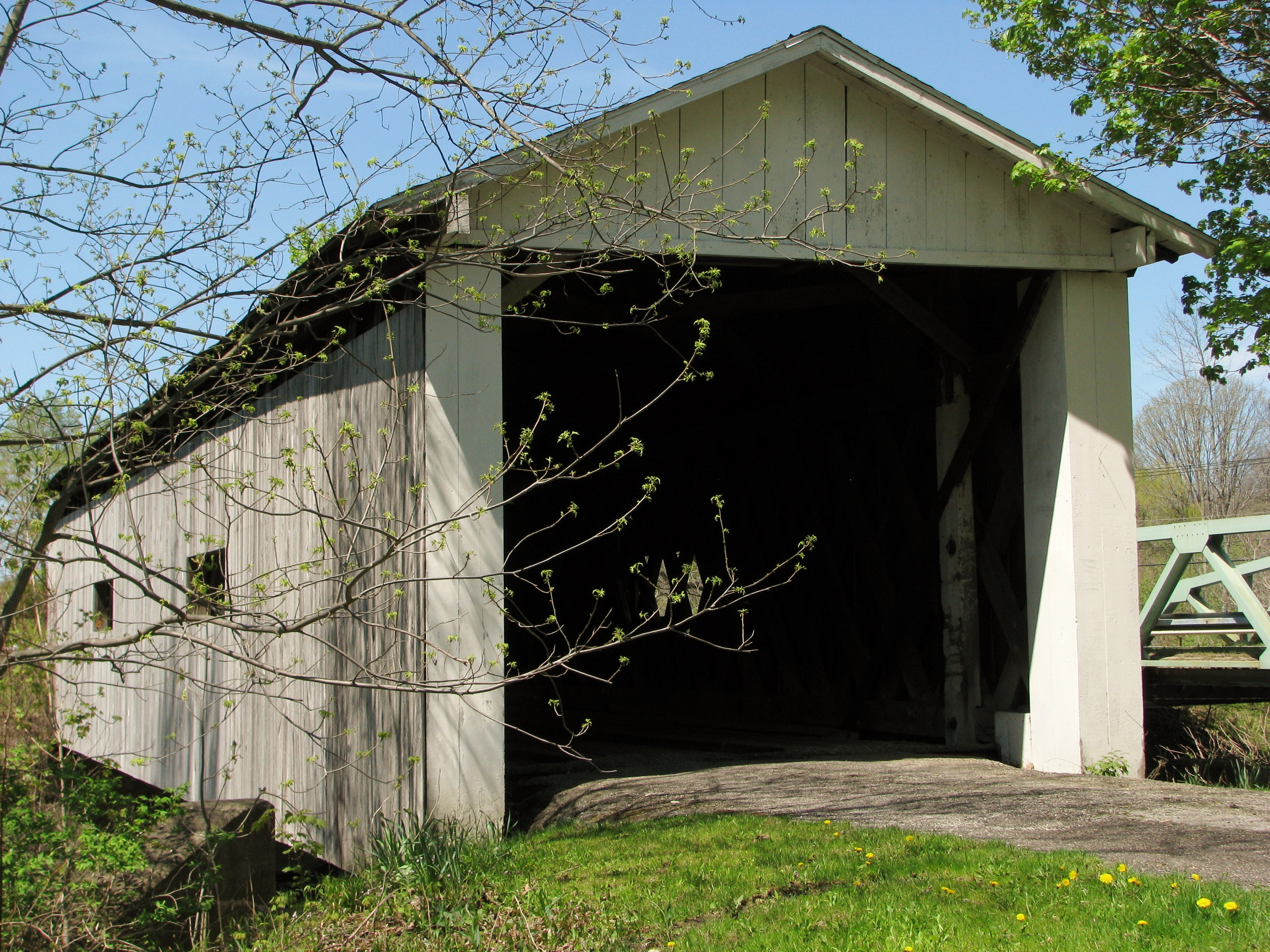

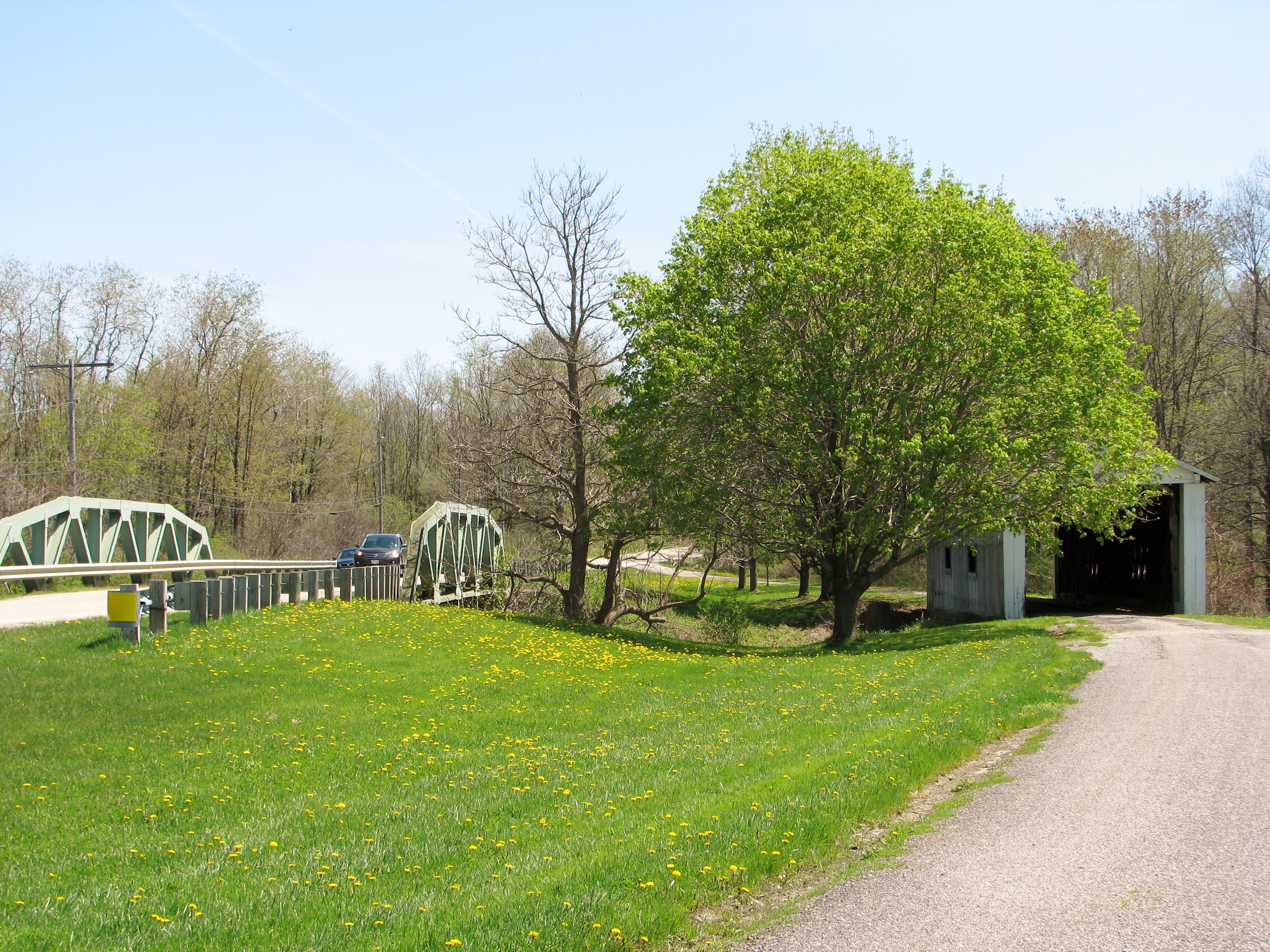

== See also ==
- List of Ashtabula County covered bridges
