= Caine Road Covered Bridge =

Caine Road Bridge
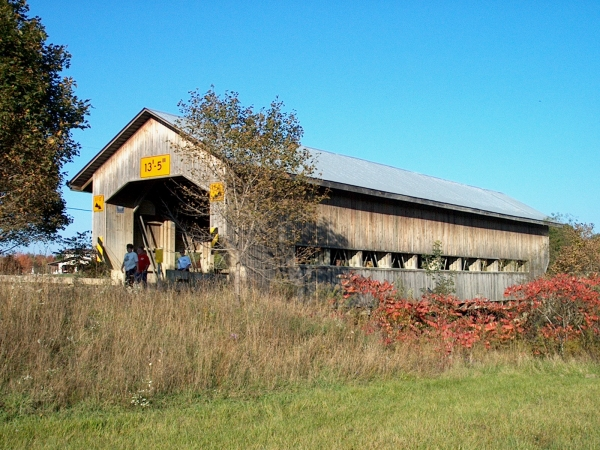
- Coordinates: 41°45′53″N 80°36′59″W
- Locale: Ashtabula County, Ohio, United States

Characteristics
- Design: single span, Pratt truss with arch
- Total length: 124 feet (37.8 m)

History
- Constructed by: John Smolen, Jr.
- Construction start: 1986

Location
- Interactive map of Caine Road Bridge

Caine Road Bridge is a covered bridge spanning the west branch of the Ashtabula River in Pierpont Township, Ashtabula County, Ohio, United States. The bridge, built in honor of Ashtabula County's 175th anniversary, and one of currently 17 drivable bridges in the county, is a single span Pratt truss design. The bridge's WGCB number is 35-04-61, and it is located approximately 13 mi (21 km) east-northeast of Jefferson.

== History ==
- 1986 – Bridge constructed.

== Caine Family History ==
Thomas Caine and wife his wife Margaret (Quiggen) Caine were born in the Isle of Mann. They emigrated to America in about 1837, settling in Newburg, Ohio, and later moving to Pierpont, where he was a farmer. They had 7 children. Thomas died in 1894, his wife Margaret earlier in 1888. They are buried in nearby Evergreen Cemetery, along with four of their children.

== Dimensions ==
- Length: 124 feet (38 m)
- Overhead clearance: 13 feet 5 inches (4.09 m)

== Photos ==
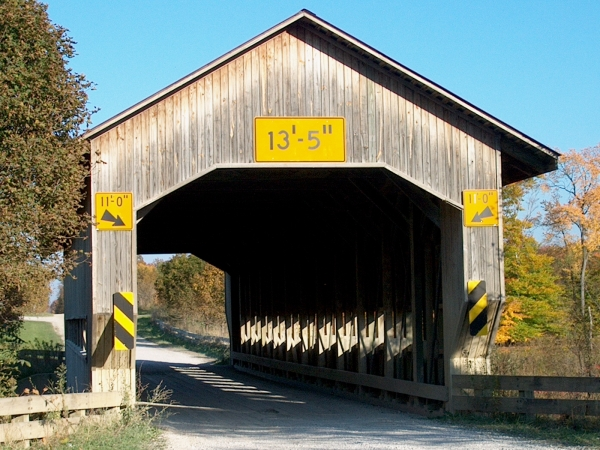
The bridge's west approach

== See also ==
- List of Ashtabula County covered bridges
