= Creek Road Covered Bridge =

Covered bridge

Creek Road Bridge
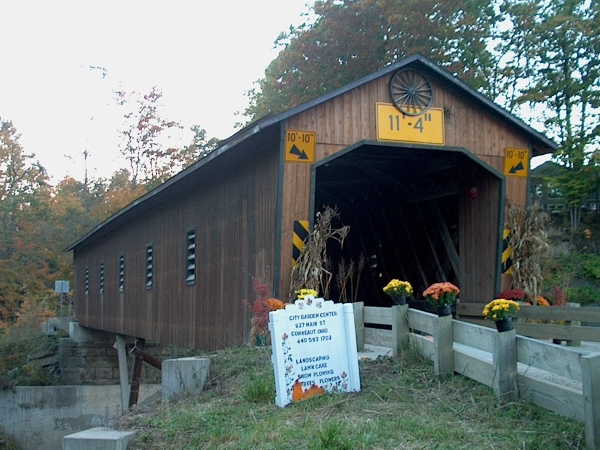
- Coordinates: 41°55′11″N 80°36′35″W
- Locale: Ashtabula County, Ohio, United States

Characteristics
- Design: single span, Town truss
- Total length: 112 feet (34.1 m)

History
- Construction start: unknown

Creek Road Bridge is a covered bridge spanning Conneaut Creek in Conneaut, Ashtabula County, Ohio, United States. The single span Town truss bridge is one of 16 bridges currently open to vehicle traffic in the county. The bridge's WGCB number is 35-04-12, and it is located approximately 3.4 mi (5.5 km) southwest of Conneaut.

== History ==
The original date of construction and opening date are not known. The bridge was last refurbished in 1994.

== Dimensions ==
- Length: 112 feet (34 m)
- Overhead clearance: 11 feet 4 inches (3.45 m)
- Underclearance: 25 feet (7.6 m)

== Gallery ==
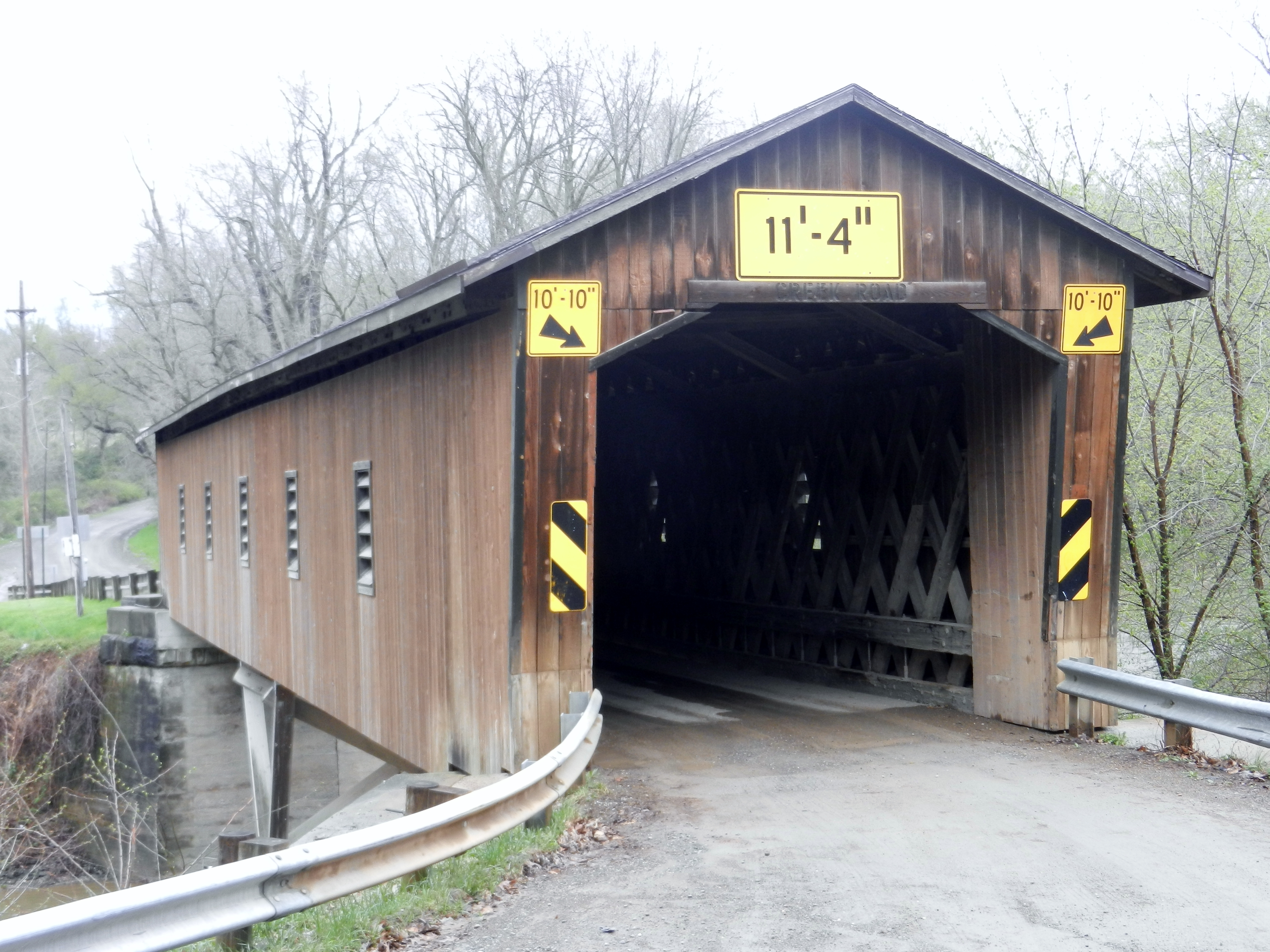

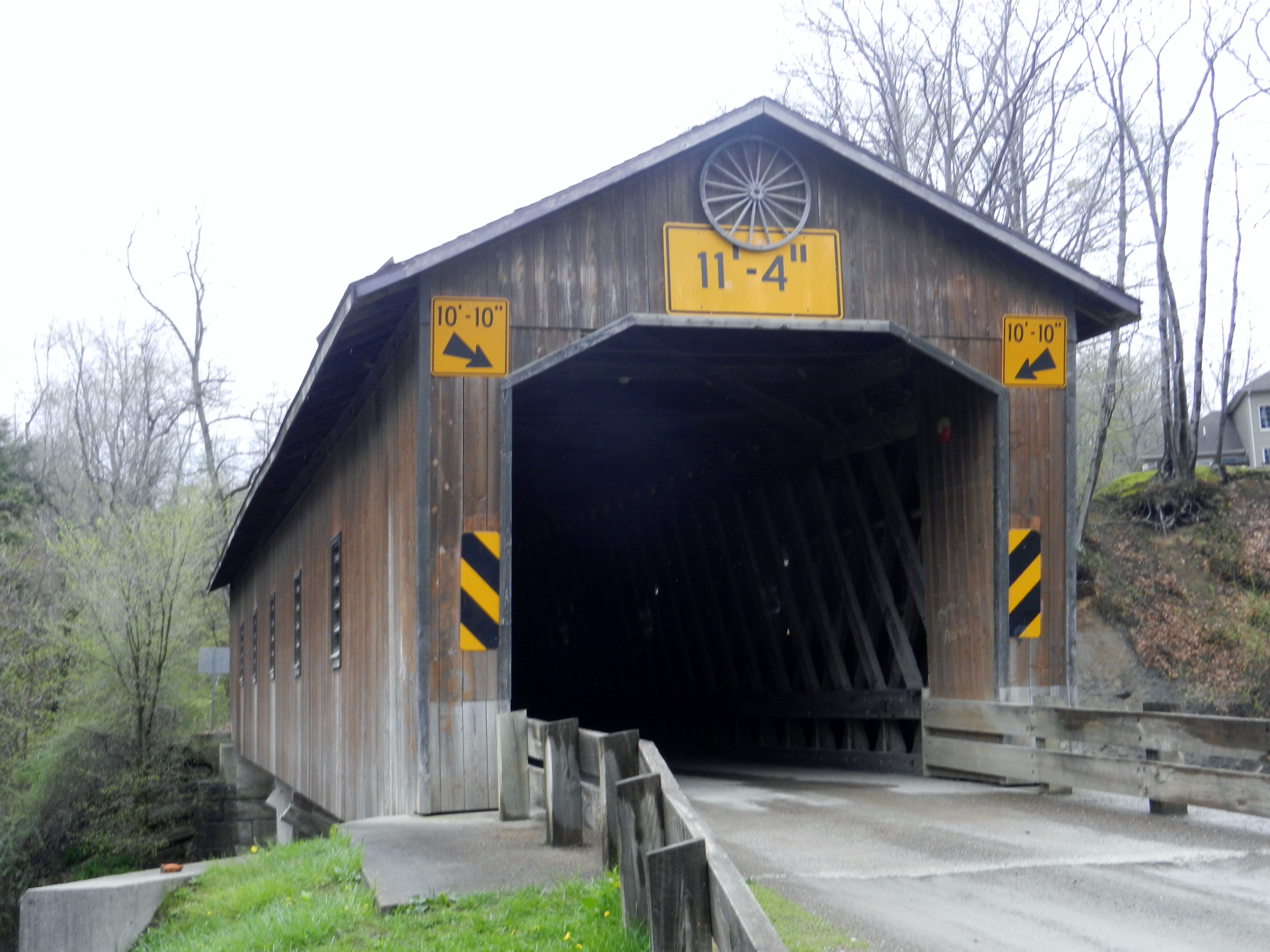

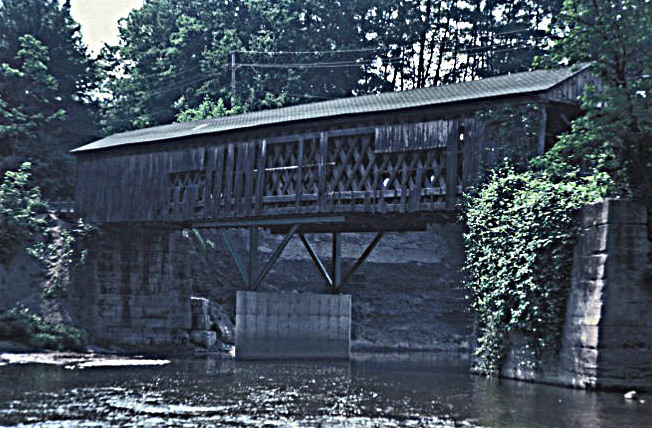

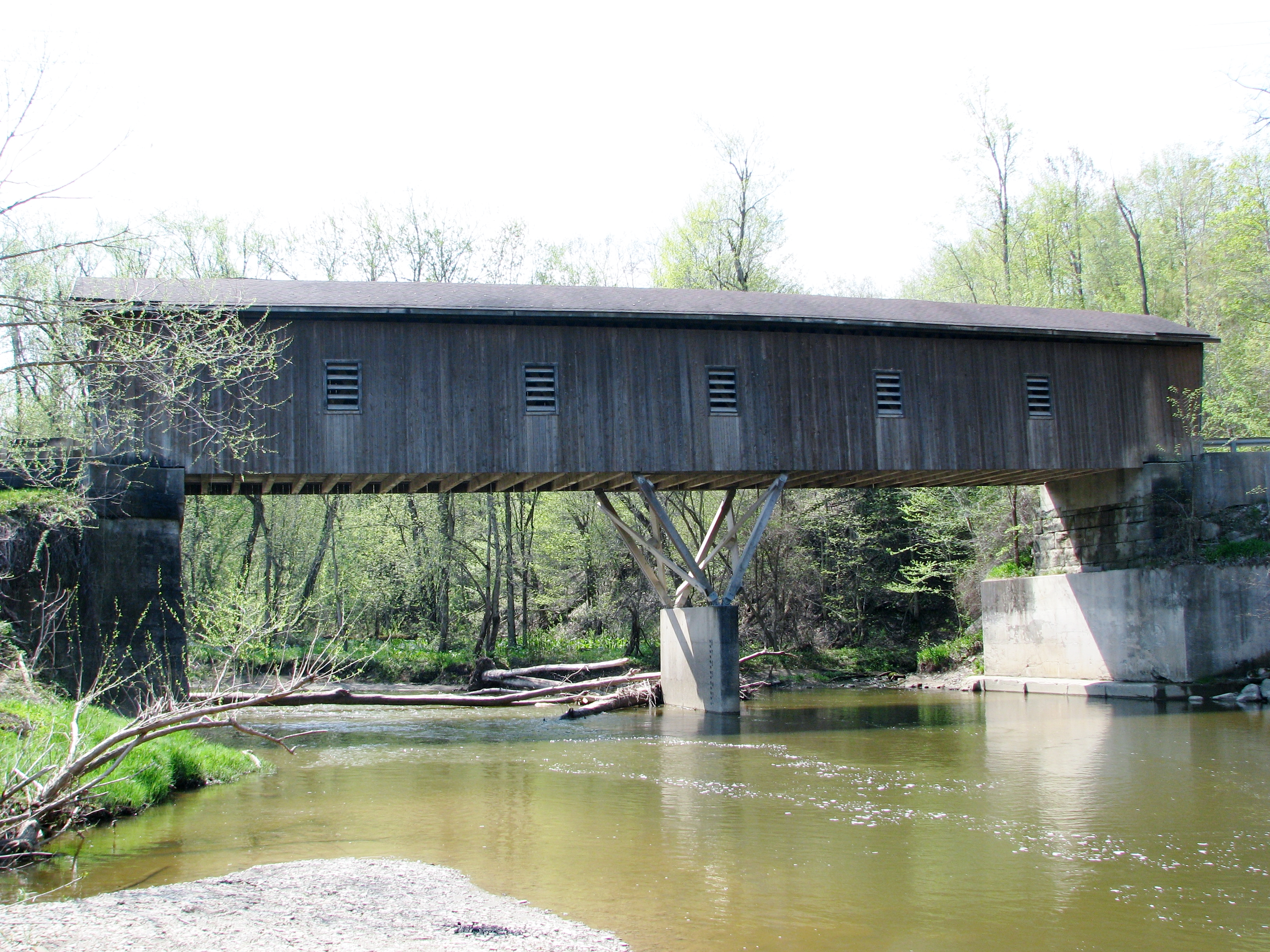

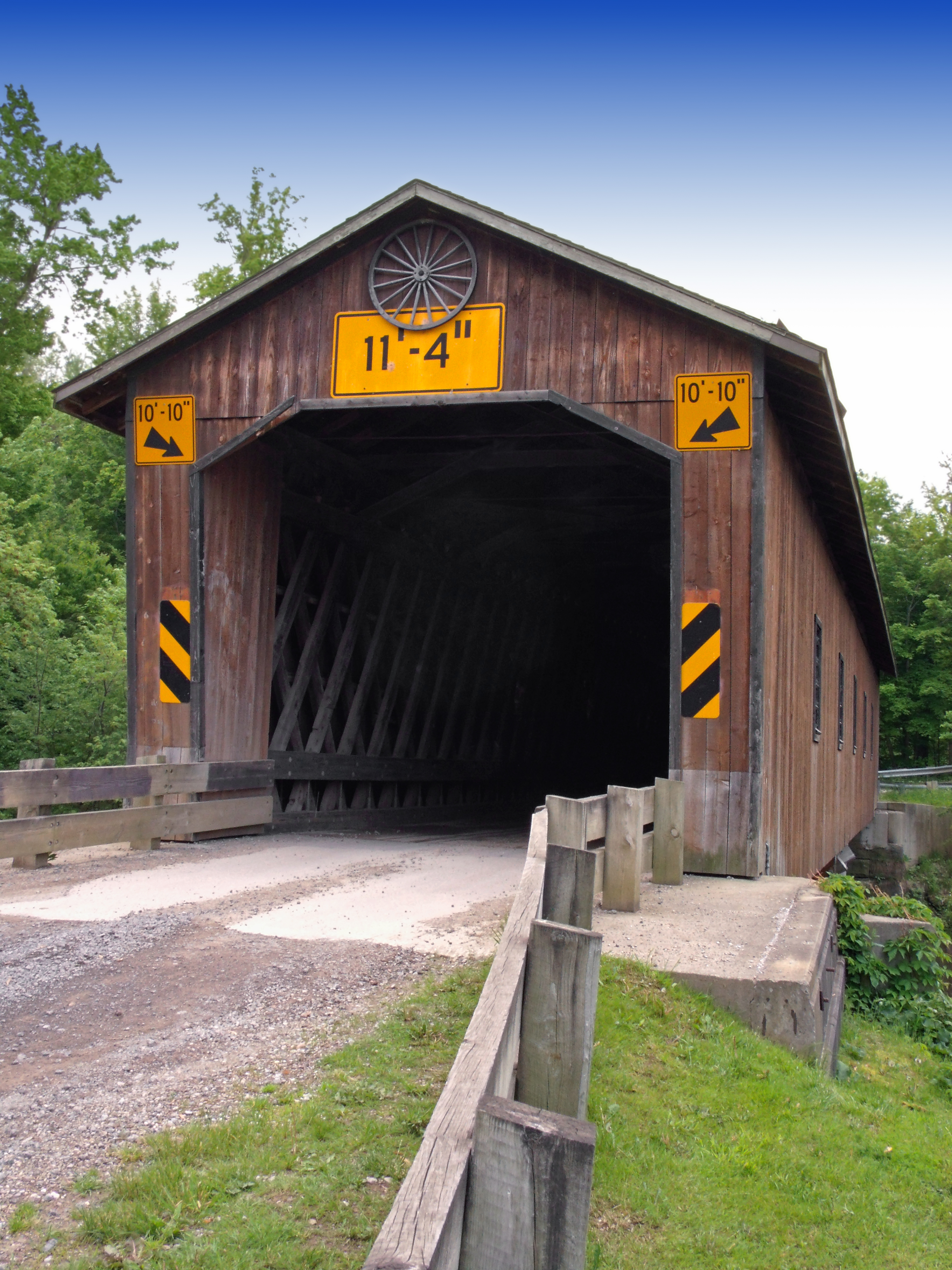

== See also ==
- List of Ashtabula County covered bridges
