= Giddings Road Covered Bridge =

Bridge in northeast Ohio, USA

Giddings Road Bridge
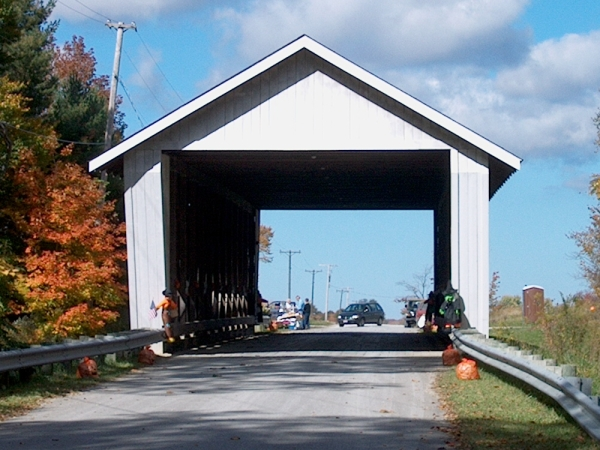
- Coordinates: 41°45′53″N 80°43′57″W
- Locale: Ashtabula County, Ohio, United States

Characteristics
- Design: single span, Pratt truss
- Total length: 107 feet (32.6 m)

History
- Construction start: 1995

Location
- Interactive map of Giddings Road Bridge

Giddings Road Bridge is a covered bridge spanning Mill Creek in Jefferson Township, Ashtabula County, Ohio, United States. The bridge, one of currently 16 drivable bridges in the county, is a single span Pratt truss design, built with funding from an ODOT Timber Grant. The bridge’s WGCB number is 35-04-62, and it is located approximately 2.7 mi (4.3 km) northeast of Jefferson.

== History ==
- 1995 – Bridge constructed

== Dimensions ==
- Length: 107 feet (32.6 m)

== Gallery ==
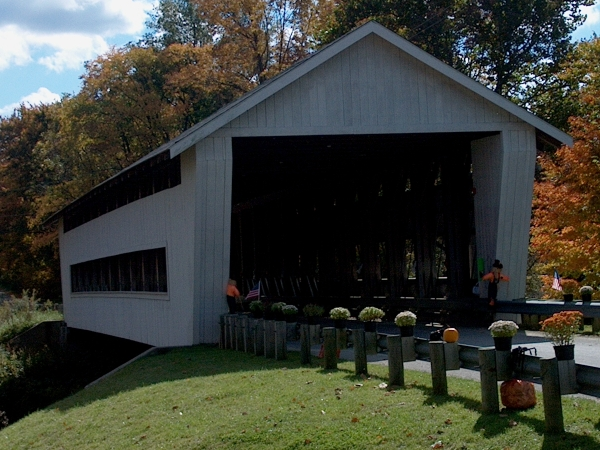
The bridge’s north approach

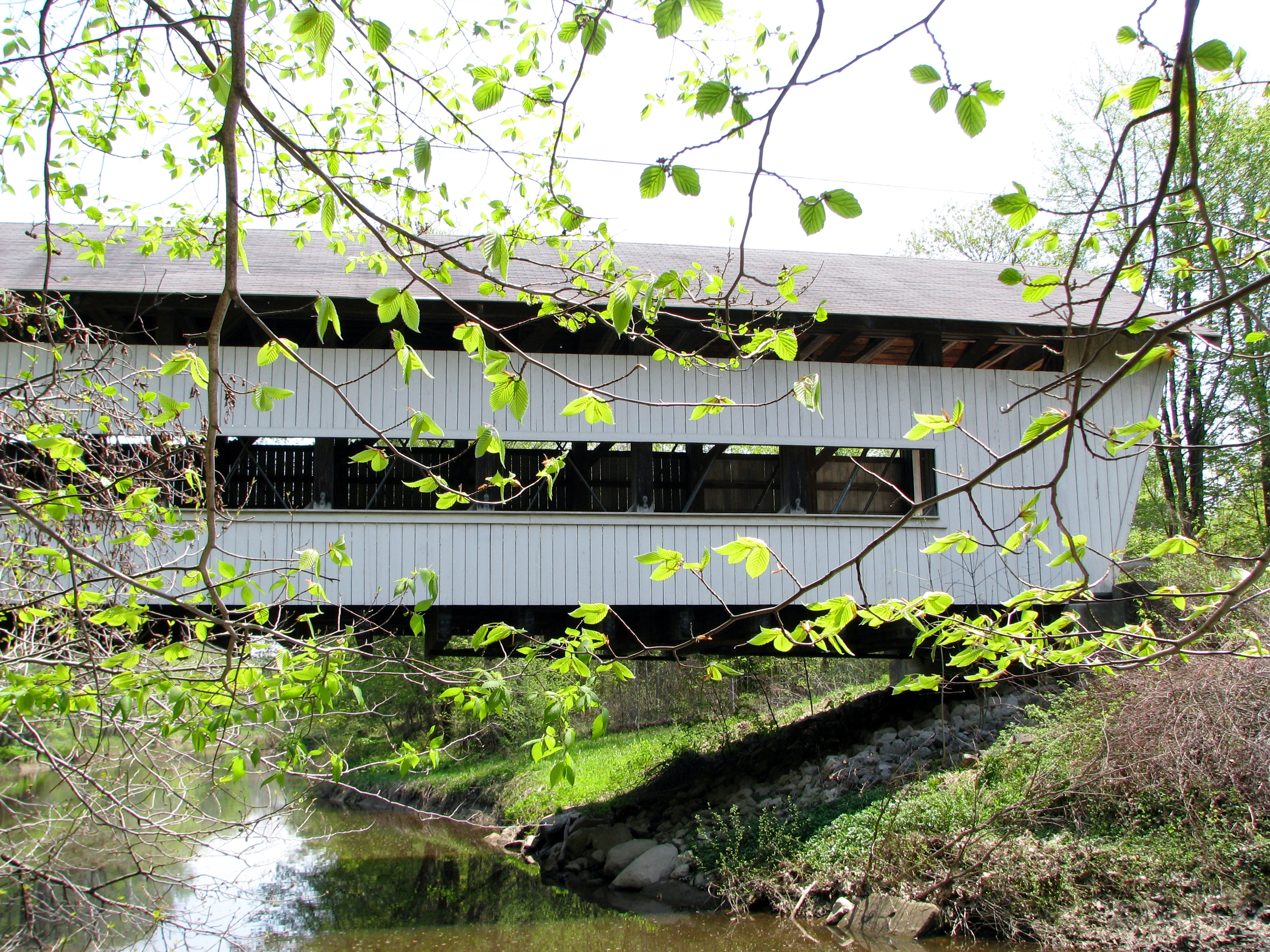

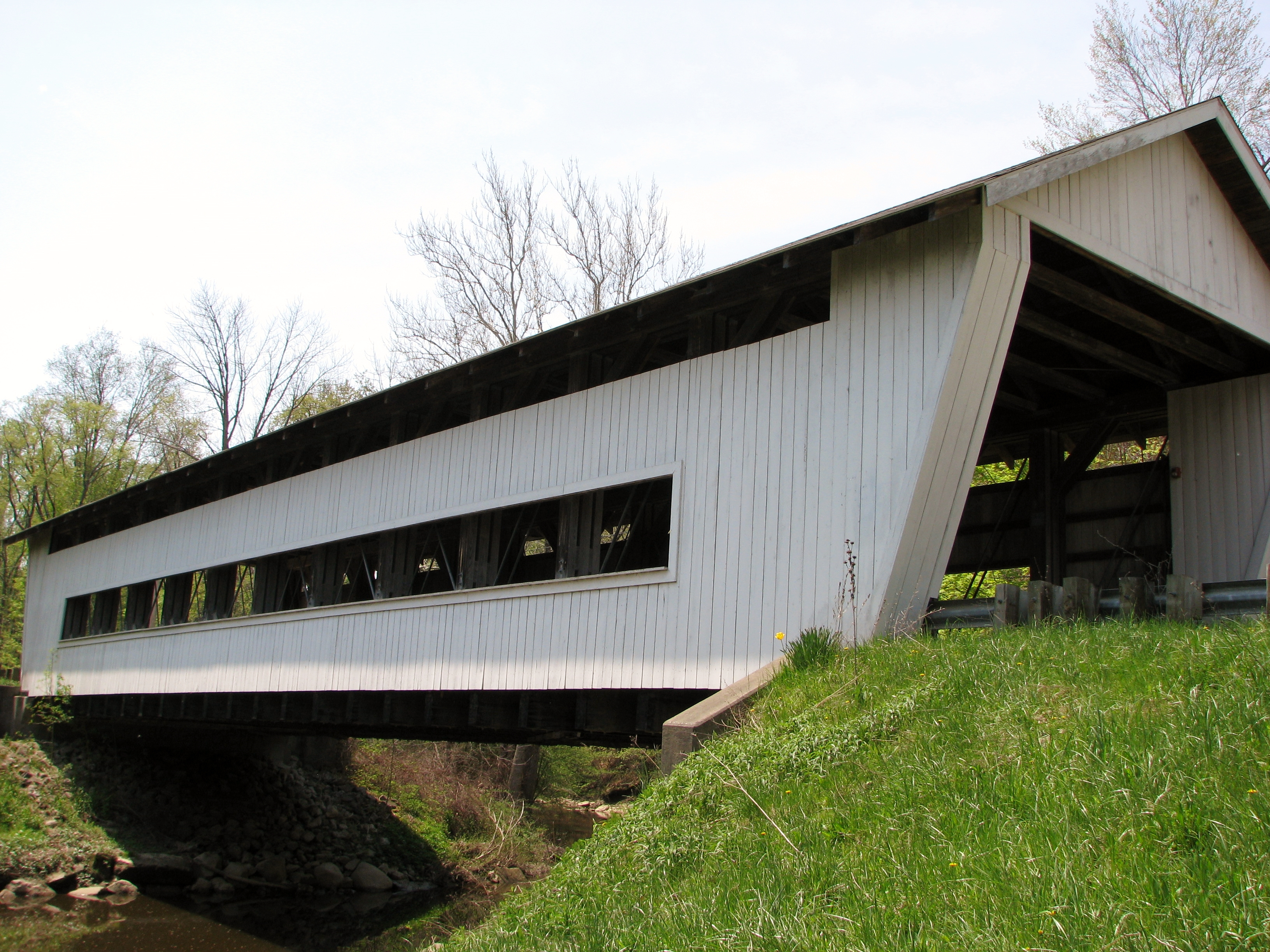

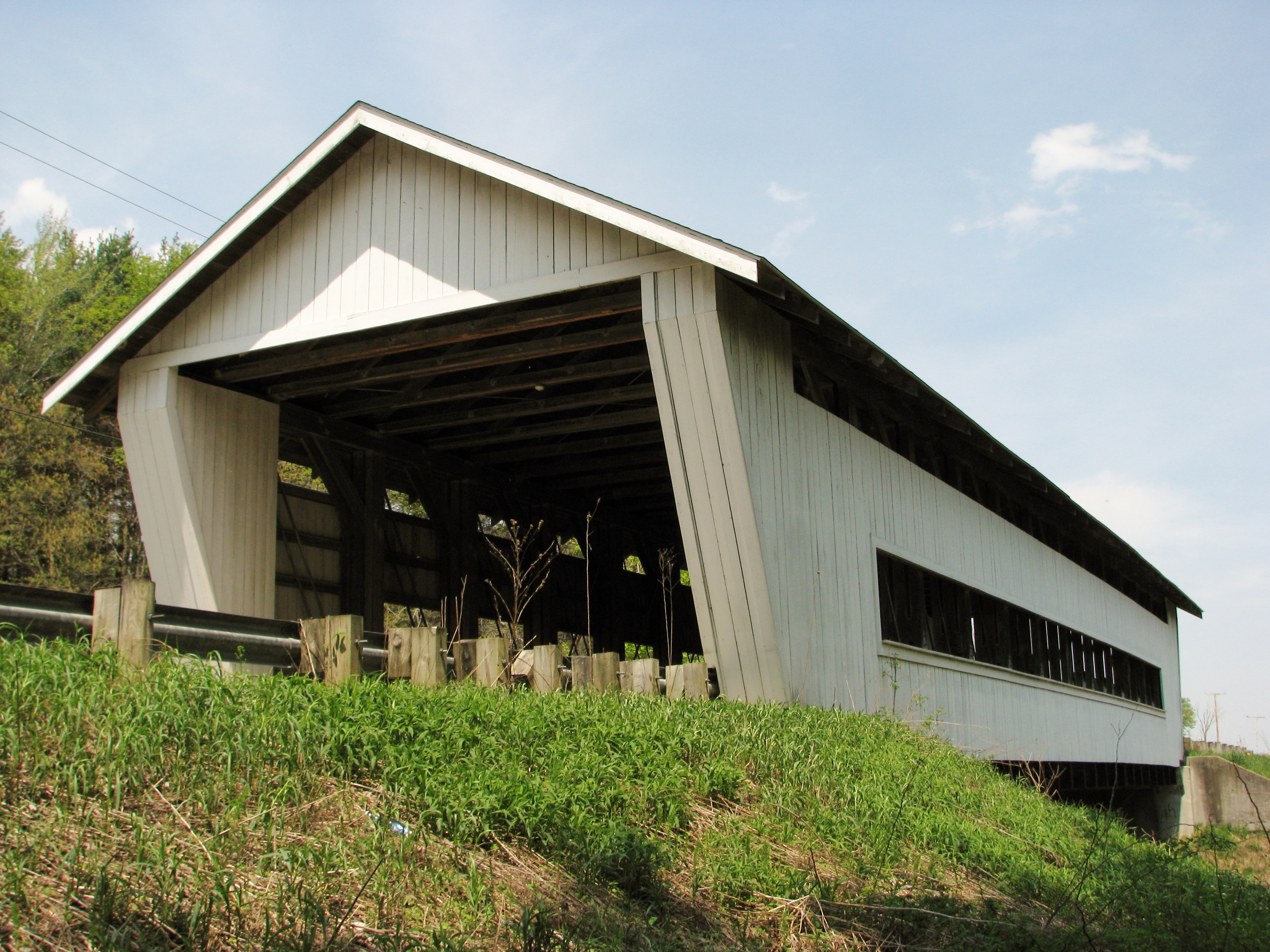

== See also ==
- List of Ashtabula County covered bridges
