= Netcher Road Covered Bridge =

Netcher Road Bridge
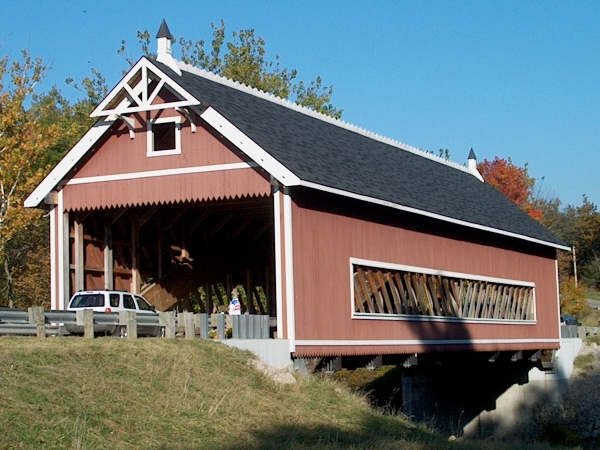
- Coordinates: 41°44′14″N 80°43′54″W
- Locale: Ashtabula County, Ohio, United States

Characteristics
- Design: single span, timber arch with inverted Haupt walls
- Total length: 110 feet (33.5 m)

History
- Constructed by: John Smolen, Jr.
- Construction start: 1998

Netcher Road Bridge is a covered bridge spanning water in Jefferson Township, Ashtabula County, Ohio, United States. The bridge, one of the newest and one of currently 17 drivable covered bridges in the county, is a single span constructed of timber arches with inverted Haupt walls, in a "Neo-Victorian" design. It was built in 1998, and it was funded by an ODOT Timber Grant. The bridge’s WGCB number is 35-04-63, and it is located approximately 2.0 mi (3.2 km) east of Jefferson.

== History ==
- 1998 – Bridge constructed.

== Dimensions ==
- Length: 110 feet (33.5 m)
- Width: 22 feet (6.7 m)

== Gallery ==
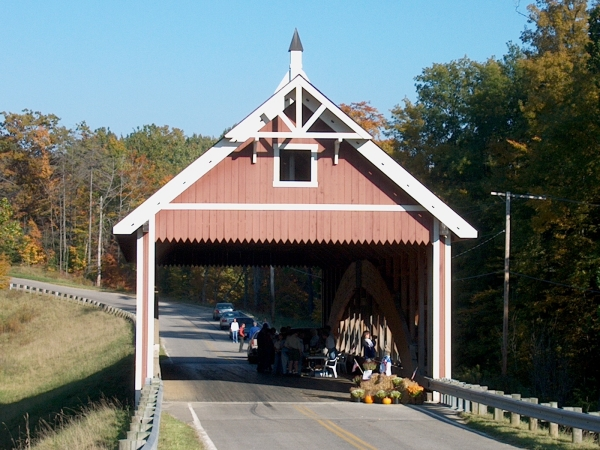
Western approach

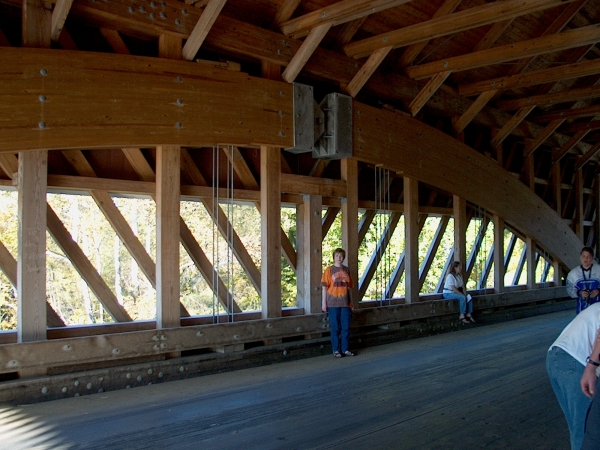
Interior featuring timber arch

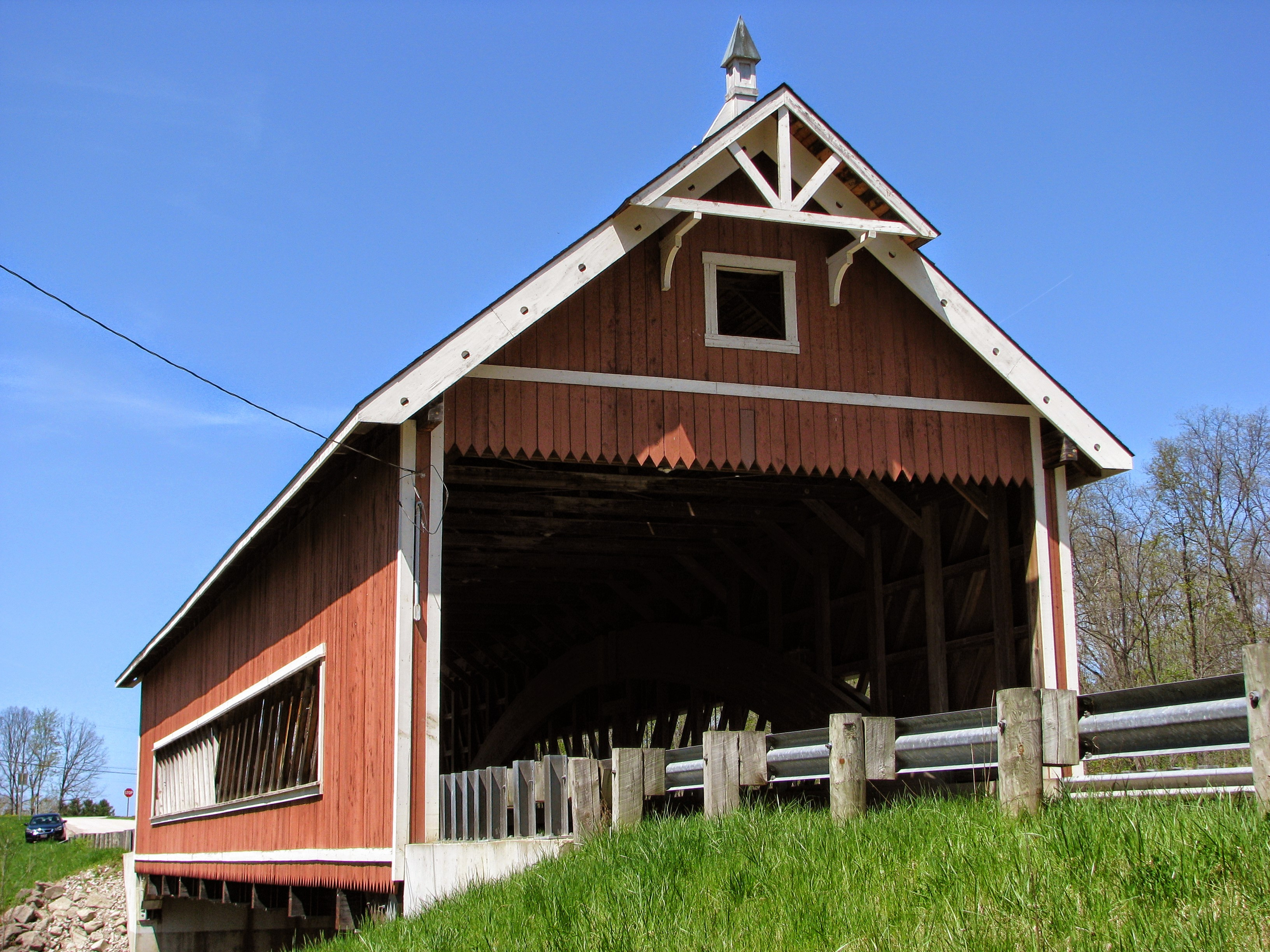
Eastern approach

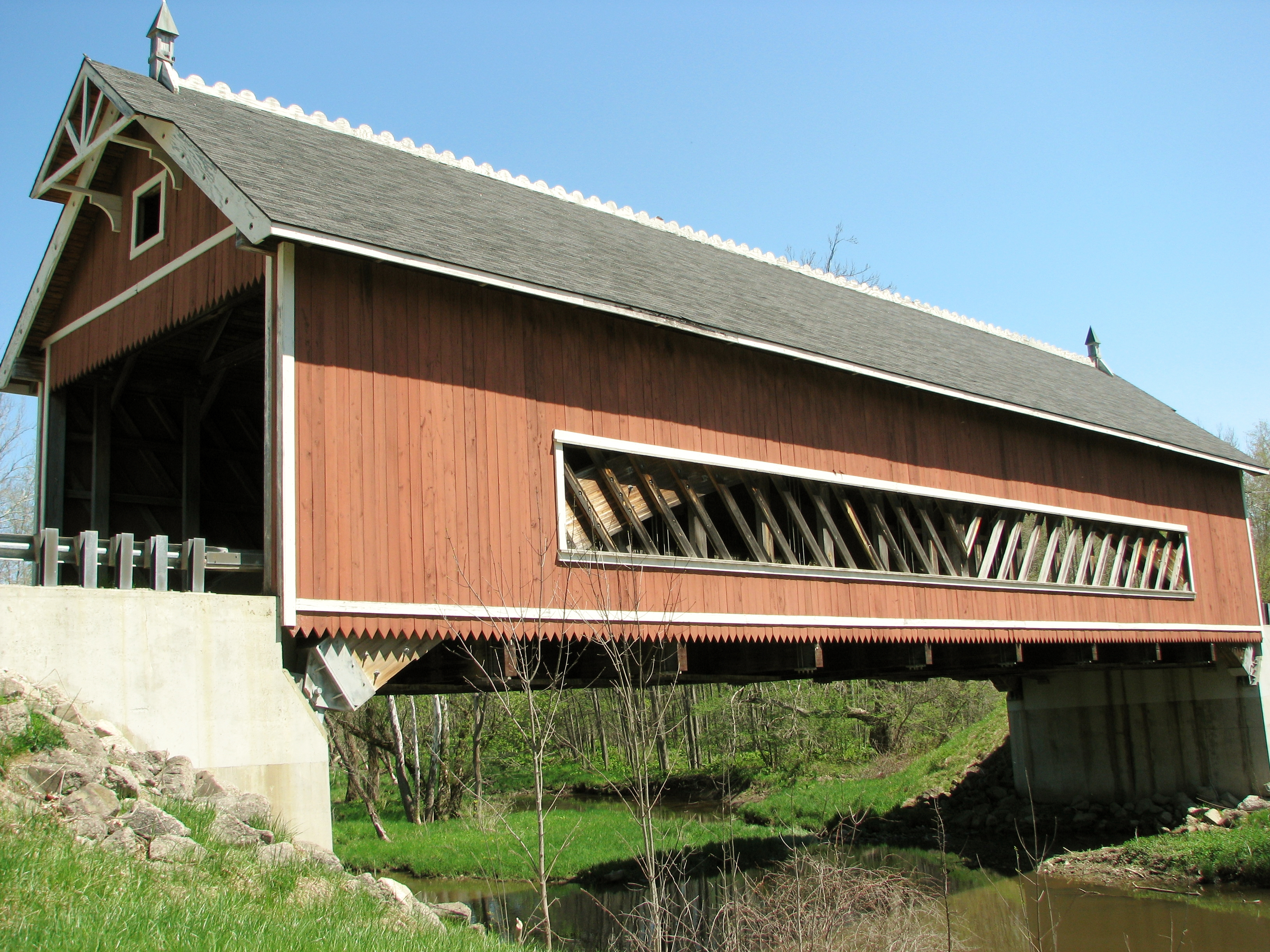

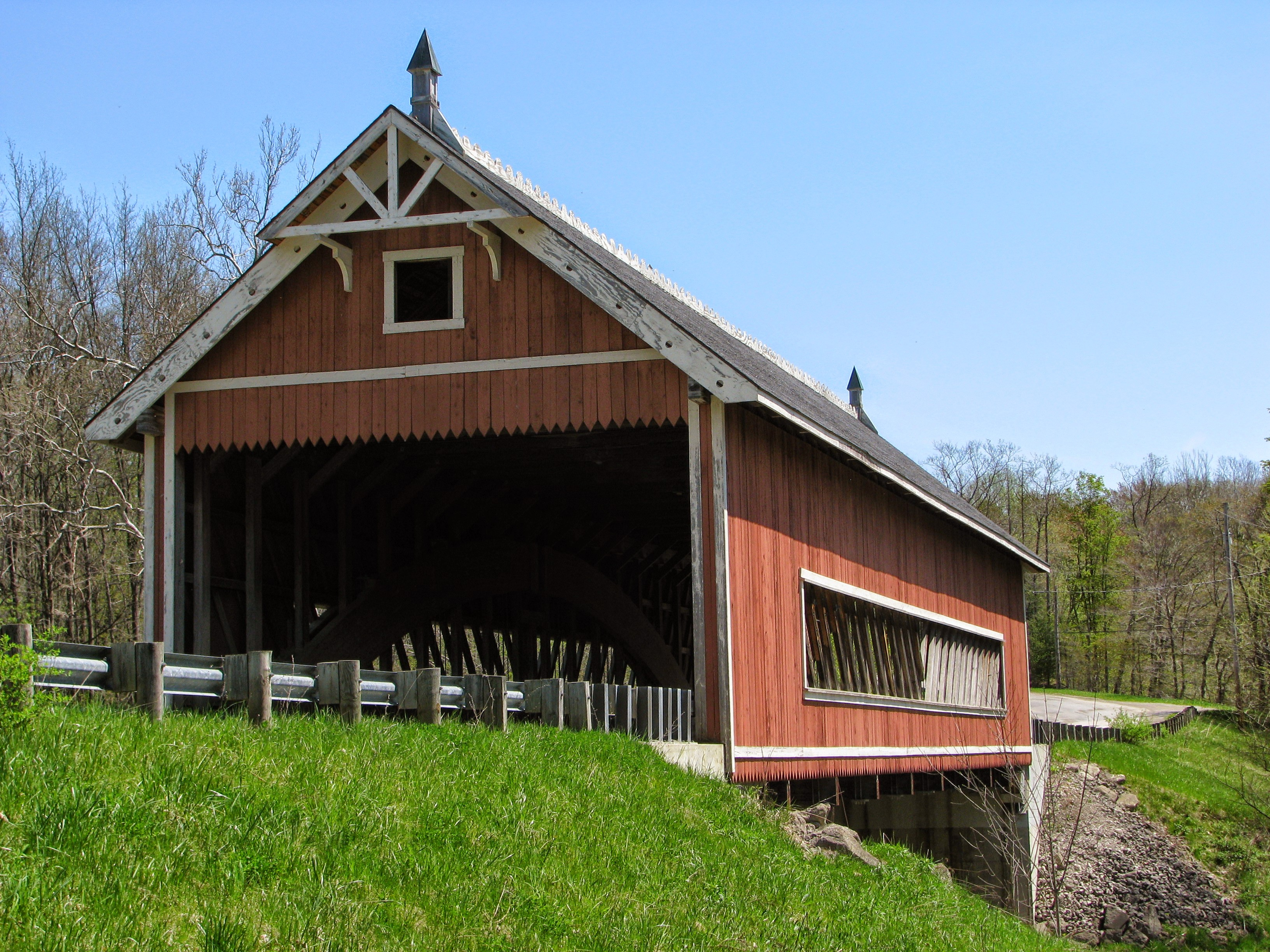

== See also ==
- List of Ashtabula County covered bridges
