= Olin's Covered Bridge =

Olin's Bridge
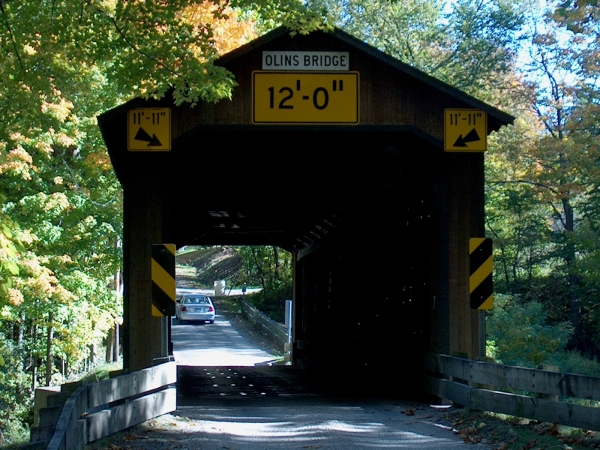
- Coordinates: 41°51′46″N 80°43′15″W
- Locale: Ashtabula County, Ohio, United States

Characteristics
- Design: single span, Town truss
- Total length: 115 feet (35.1 m)

History
- Construction start: 1873

Olin's Bridge, or Olin Bridge, or Olin-Dewey Road Bridge is a covered bridge that carries Dewey Road over the Ashtabula River in Plymouth Township, Ashtabula County, Ohio, United States. The bridge, one of currently 16 drivable bridges in the county, is a single span Town truss design, and is currently the only bridge in the county named for a family. The Olin family has owned property next to the bridge since it was built. Members of the Olin family also operate a small museum and gift shop just east of the bridge at the house previously owned by Joyce Grandbouche. The bridge’s WGCB number is 35-04-03, and it is located approximately 3.6 mi (5.7 km) east of Ashtabula.

== History ==
- 1873 – Bridge constructed.
- 1985 – Bridge renovated.

The Olin family owned land next to the bridge. Alson and Alvina (Bennett) Olin were a pioneering family, coming to this area in 1832 from New York. His son Alson Olin, bought land in 1860, next to where the bridge now sits.

== Dimensions ==
- Length: 115 feet (35.1 m)
- Overhead clearance: 12 feet (3.7 m)

== Gallery ==
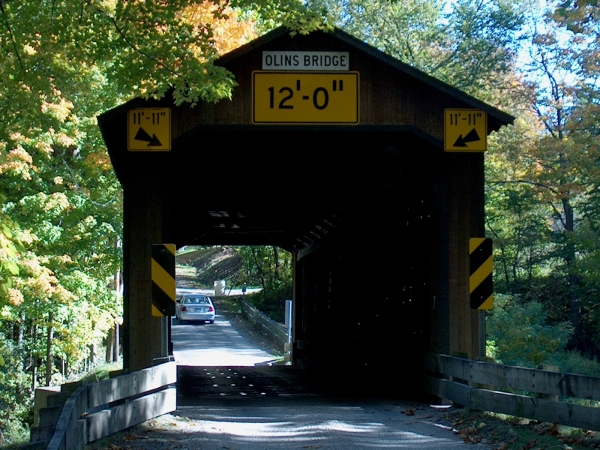
description

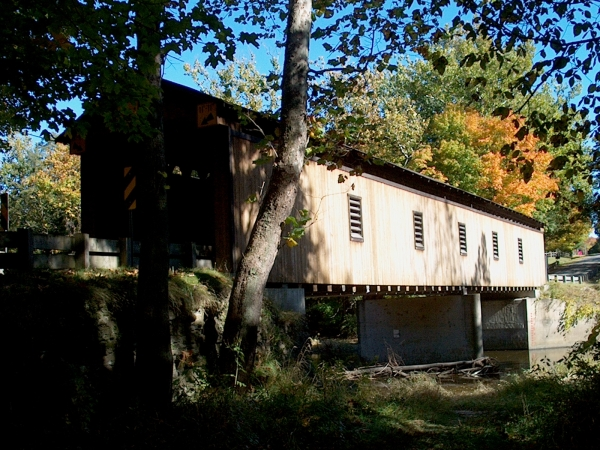
description

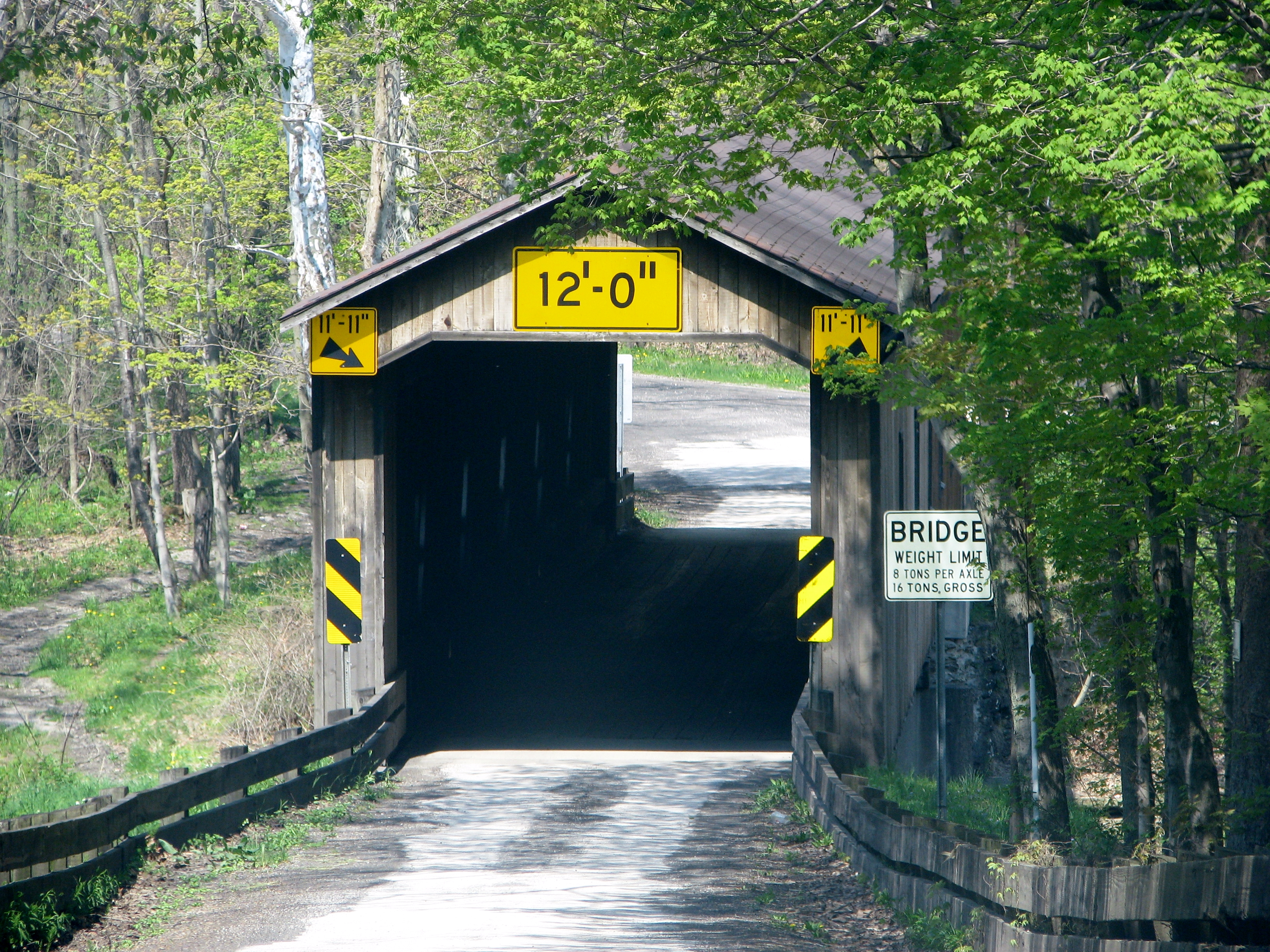

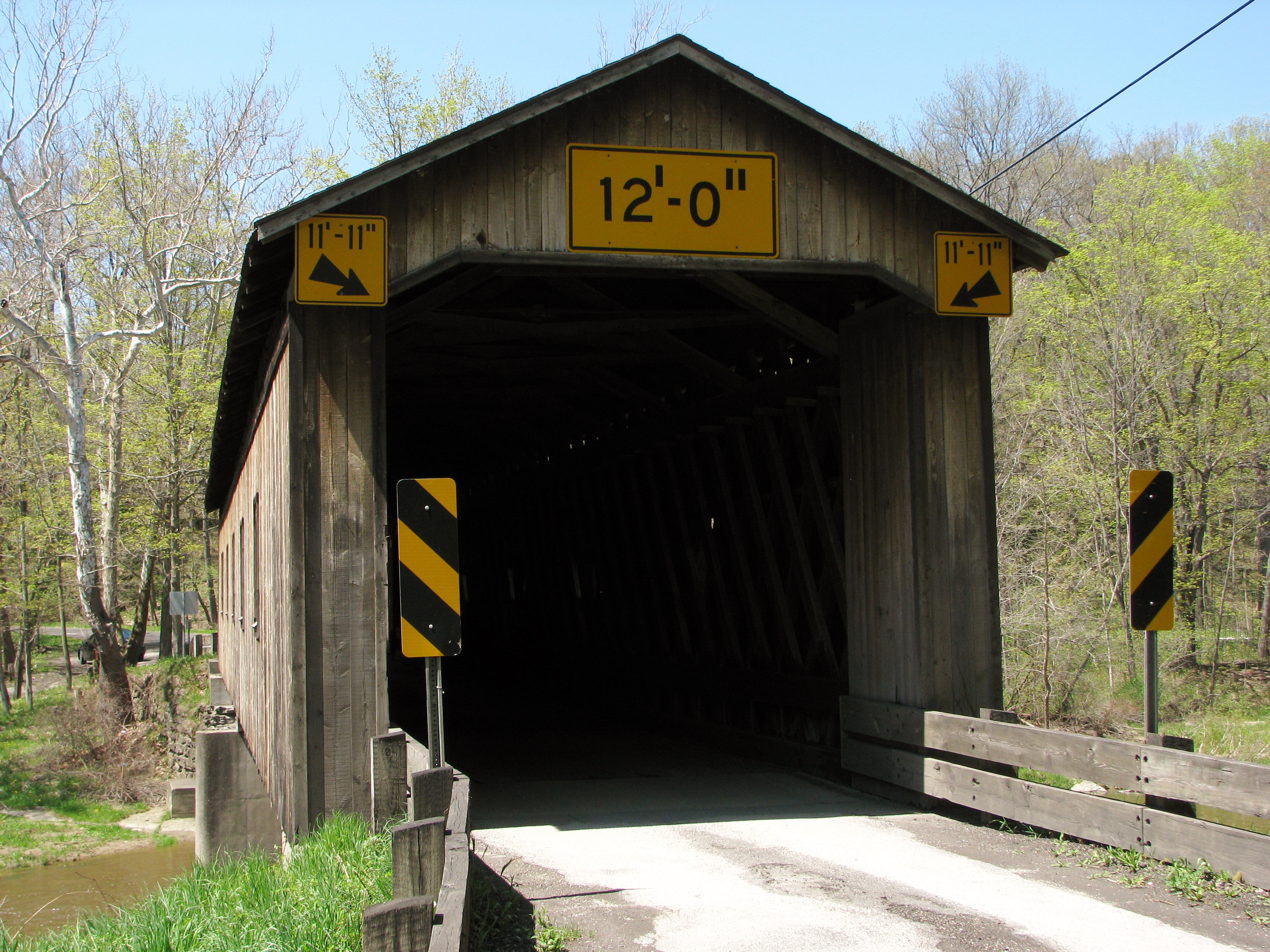

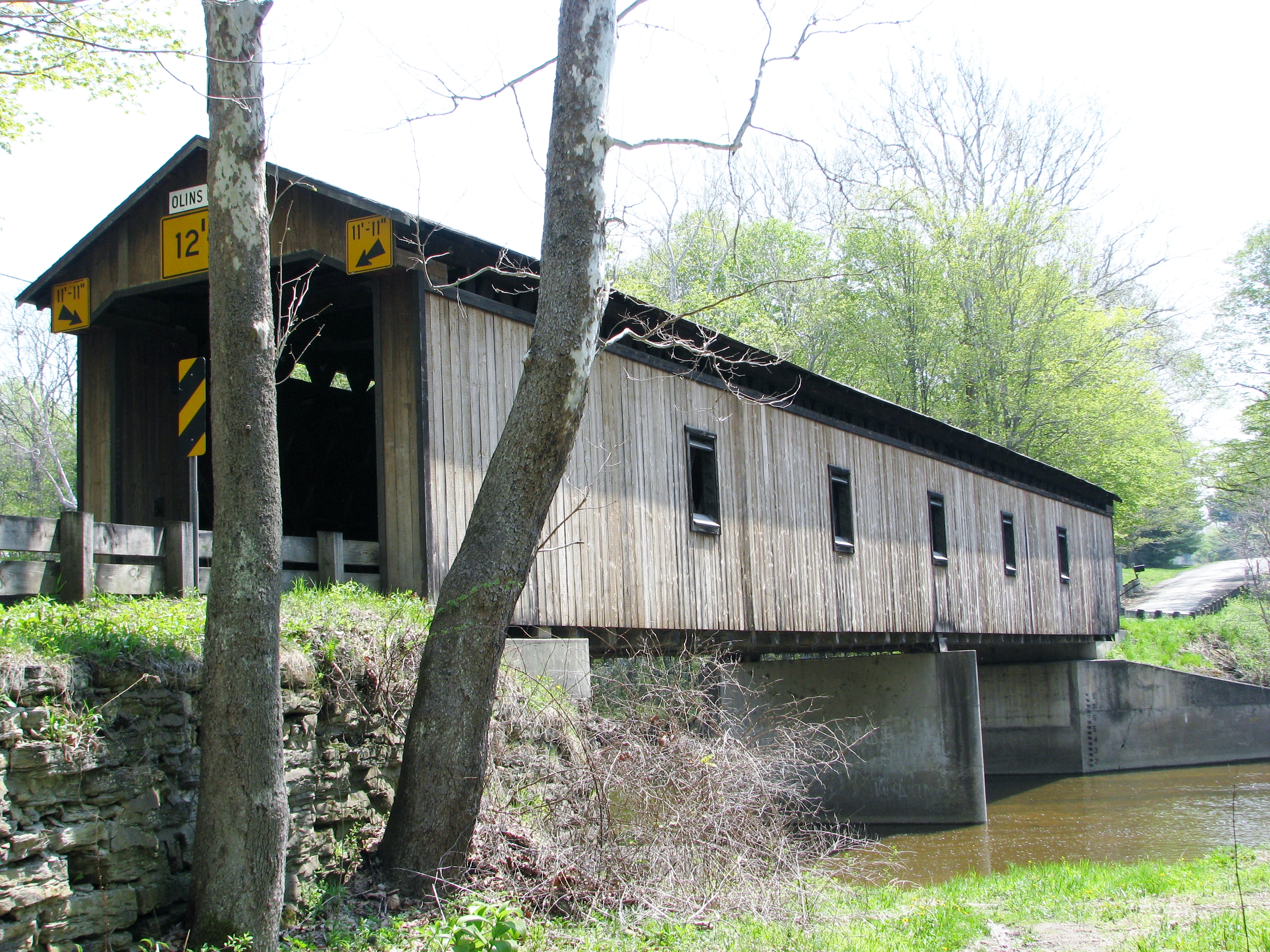

== See also ==
- List of Ashtabula County covered bridges
