= Graham Road Covered Bridge =

Graham Road Bridge
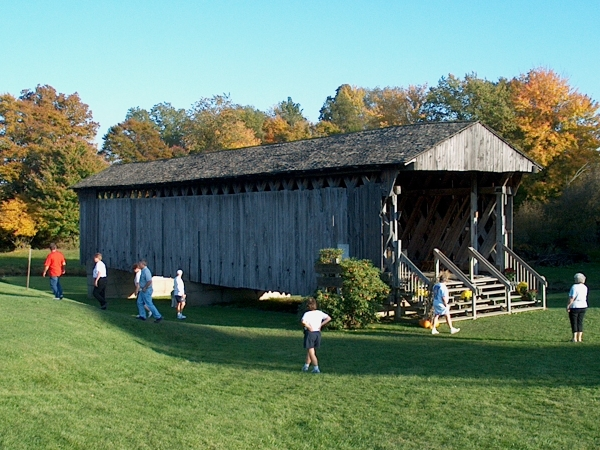
- Coordinates: 41°46′53″N 80°37′06″W
- Locale: Ashtabula County, Ohio, United States

Characteristics
- Design: single span, Town truss
- Total length: 97 feet (29.6 m)

History
- Construction start: 1913

Location
- Interactive map of Graham Road Bridge

Graham Road Bridge is a covered bridge which formerly spanned the west branch of the Ashtabula River in Pierpont Township, Ashtabula County, Ohio, United States. Built from remnants of a former covered bridge that was damaged in a flood in 1913, the bridge now sits in an Ashtabula County MetroPark along the south side of Graham Road, near its original site, and is a single span Town truss design. Relocated in 1972, it is no longer open to vehicle traffic. The bridge’s WGCB number is 35-04-13, and it is located approximately 8.4 miles (13.5 km) east-northeast of Jefferson.

== History ==
- 1913 – Bridge constructed.
- 1972 – Bridge moved to its current site.

== Dimensions ==
- Length: 97 feet (29.6 m)

== Gallery ==
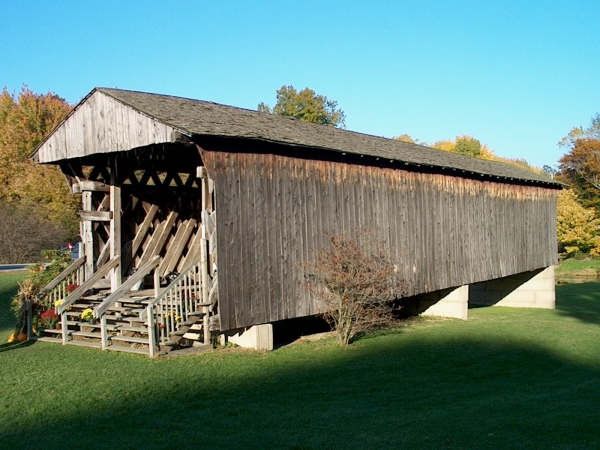
View from the southwest

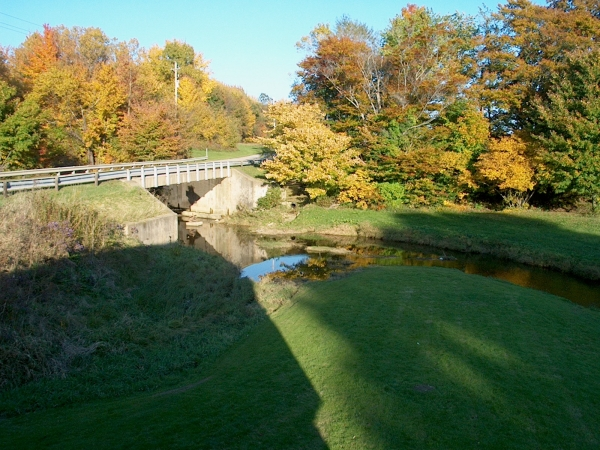
View from the east end of the bridge, looking toward its former site

== See also ==
- List of Ashtabula County covered bridges
