= Doyle Road Covered Bridge =

Doyle Road Bridge
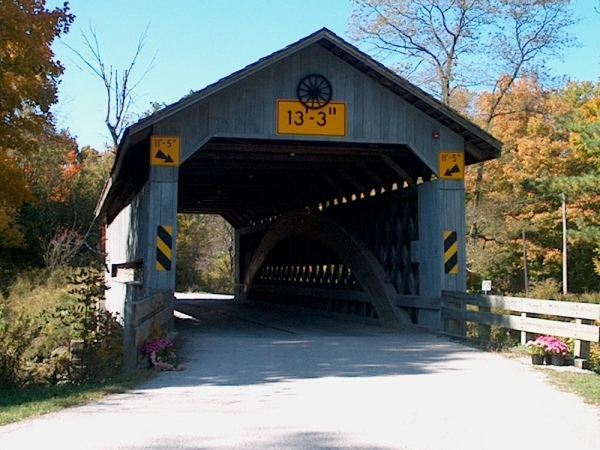
- Coordinates: 41°45′44″N 80°47′25″W
- Locale: Ashtabula County, Ohio, United States

Characteristics
- Design: single span, Town truss
- Total length: 94 feet (28.7 m)

History
- Construction start: 1868

Location
- Interactive map of Doyle Road Bridge

Doyle Road Bridge is a covered bridge spanning Mill Creek in Jefferson Township, Ashtabula County, Ohio, United States. The bridge, one of 16 drivable bridges in the county, is a single span Town truss design, with laminated arches added during its renovation in 1987. The bridge’s WGCB number is 35-04-16, and it is located approximately 1.9 mi (3.1 km) north-northwest of Jefferson.

== History ==
- 1868 – Bridge constructed.
- 1987 – Bridge renovated.

Mill Creek which the bridge crosses is named after the Mills family, early pioneer settlers to the area.

== Dimensions ==
- Length: 94 feet (29 m)
- Overhead clearance: 13 feet 3 inches (4.04 m)

== Photo ==
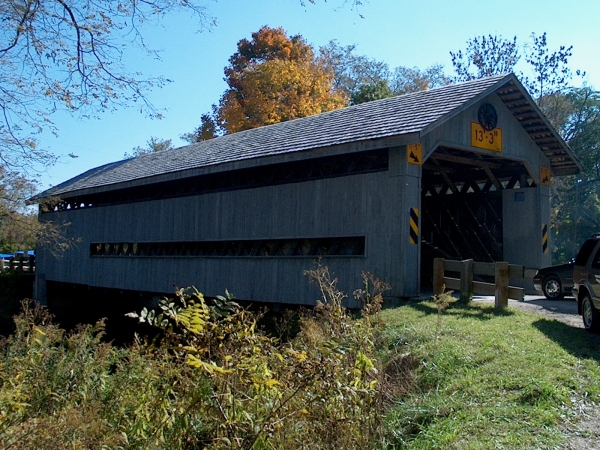
View from northeast

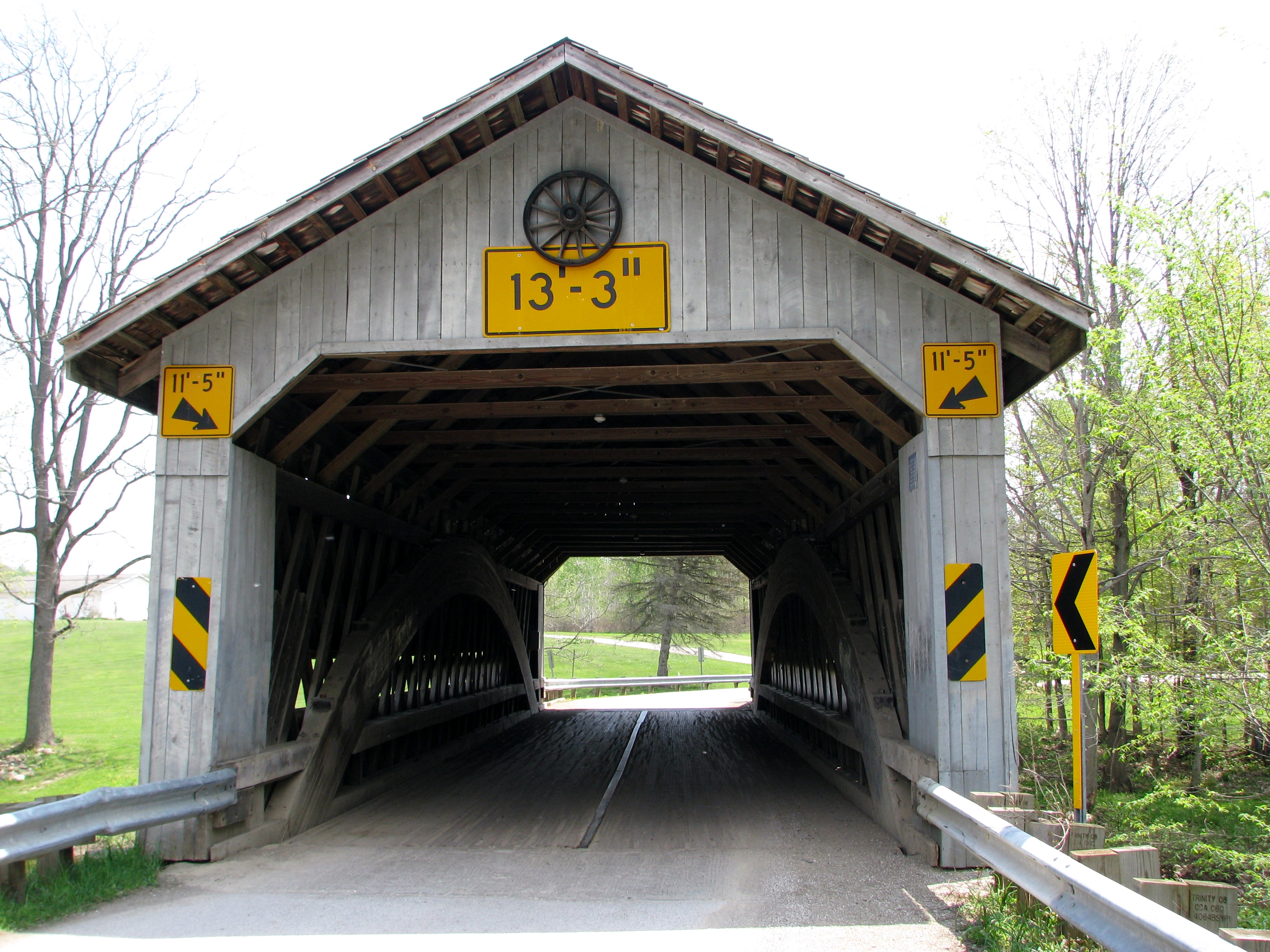

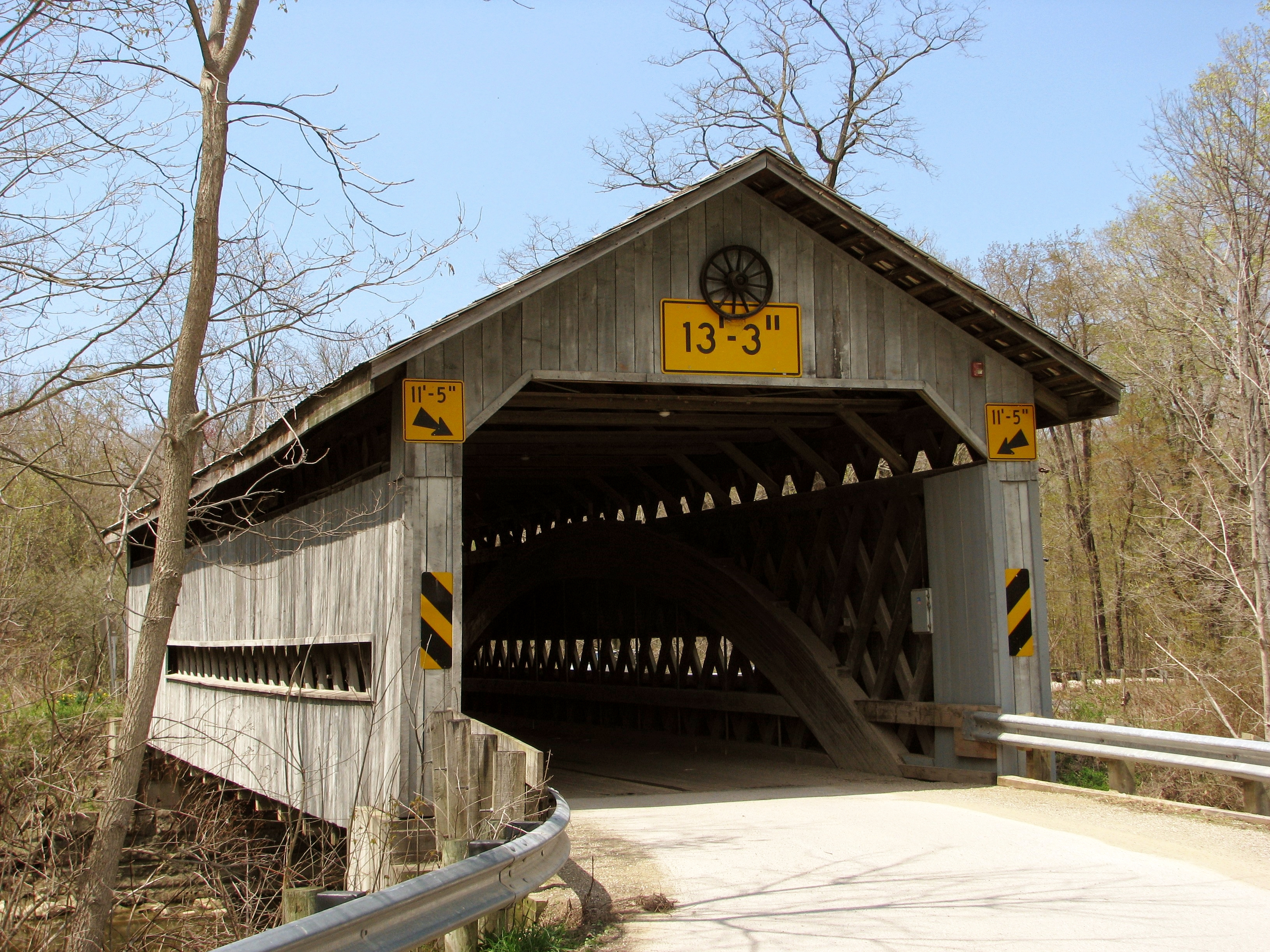

== See also ==
- List of Ashtabula County covered bridges
