= Mechanicsville Road Covered Bridge =

Mechanicsville Road Bridge
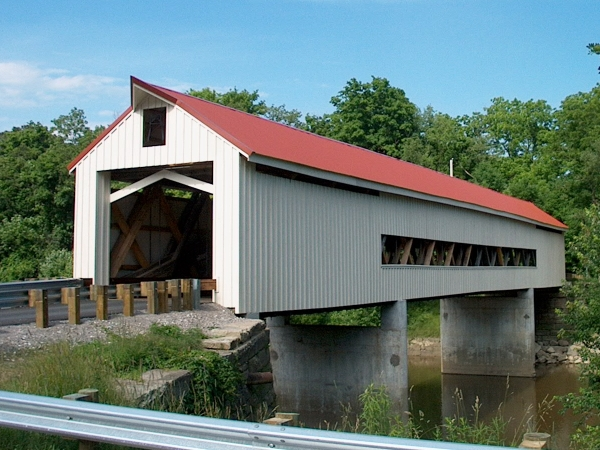
- Coordinates: 41°45′17″N 80°53′53″W
- Locale: Ashtabula County, Ohio, United States

Characteristics
- Design: single span, Howe truss with arch
- Total length: 156 feet (47.5 m)

History
- Construction start: 1867

Location
- Interactive map of Mechanicsville Road Bridge

Mechanicsville Road Bridge is a covered bridge spanning the Grand River in Austinburg Township, Ashtabula County, Ohio, United States. The bridge, one of currently 17 drivable bridges in the county, is the longest single span covered bridge in the county, and is believed to be the oldest in the county as well. The bridge is a Howe truss design, with laminated arches added during its renovation in 2003-04. The bridge’s WGCB number is 35-04-18, and it is located approximately 4.3 mi (7.0 km) southeast of Geneva.

== History ==
- 1867 – Bridge constructed.
- unknown – The bridge was closed to traffic until the renovations were completed in 2004.
- unknown – Mechanicsville Road was rerouted from just west of the bridge to just east and north across a new bridge.
- 2003-04 – Bridge renovated.
- 2004 – Bridge rededicated and reopened to traffic.

== Dimensions ==
- Length: 156 feet (0.0 m)

== Gallery ==
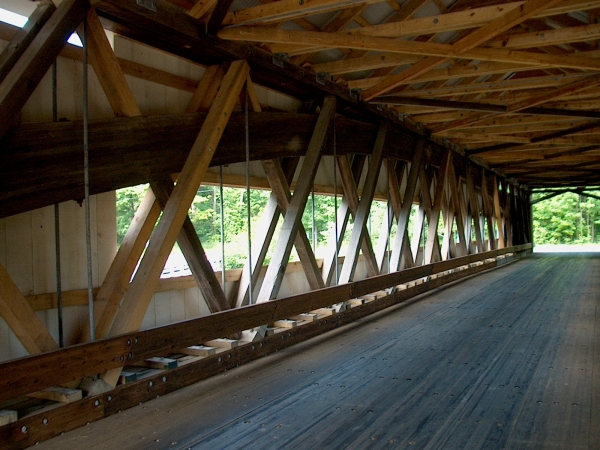
Interior view, showing the truss design

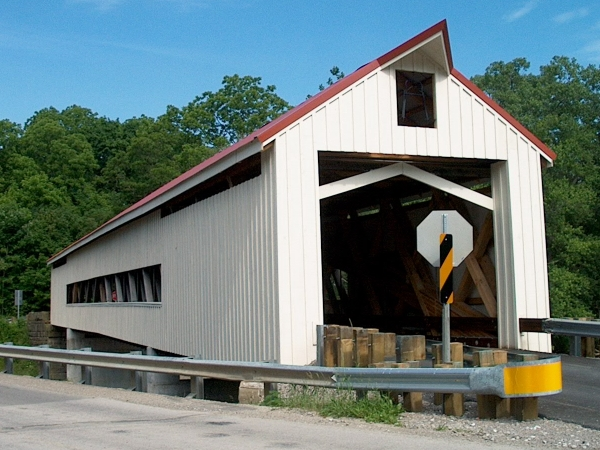
View from the west

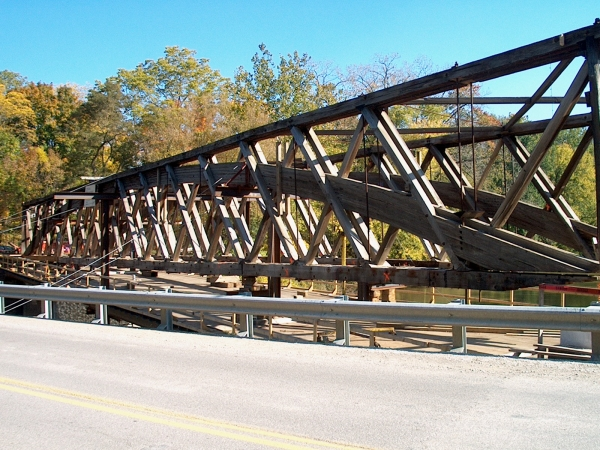
Bridge during its renovation

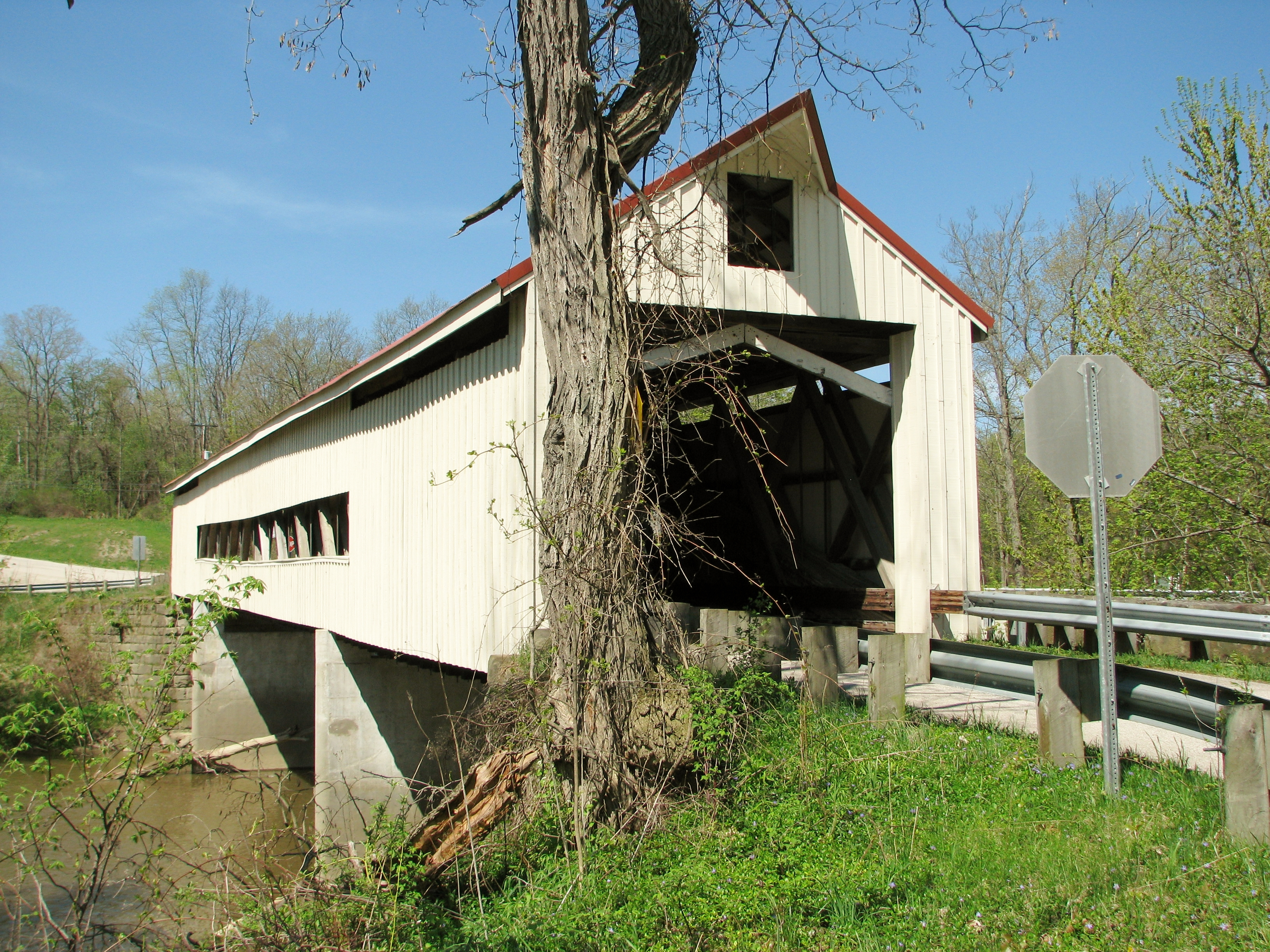

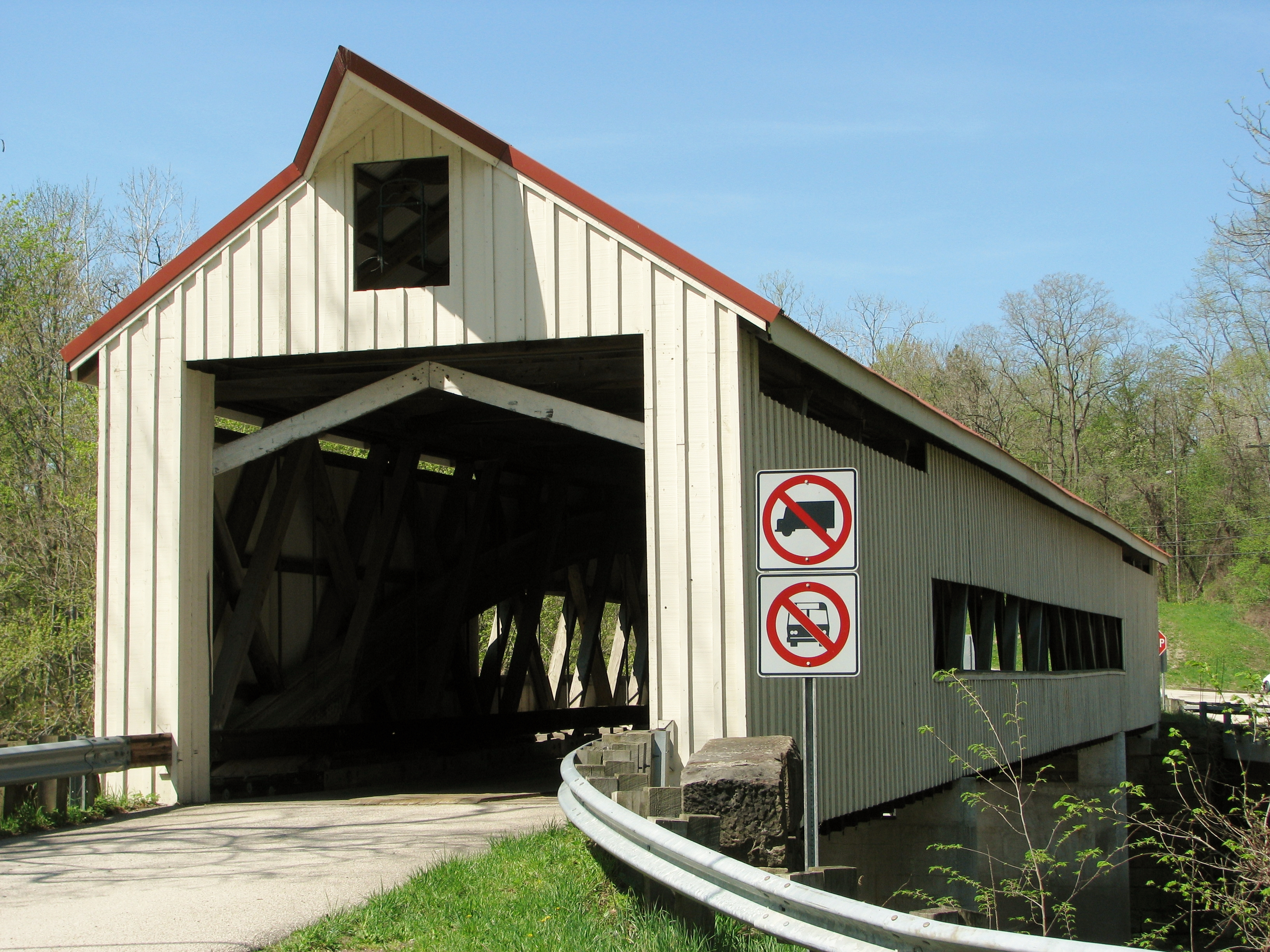

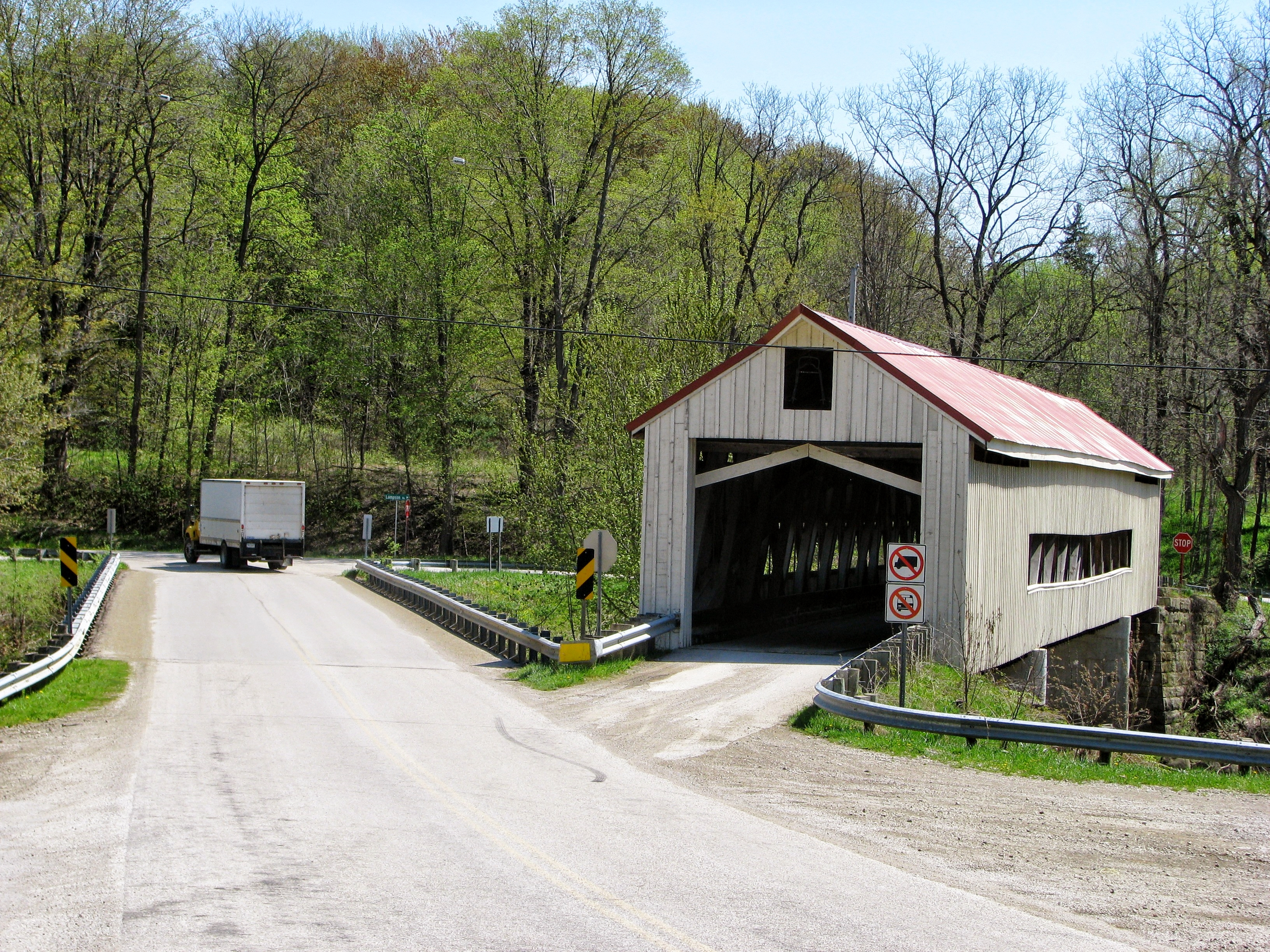

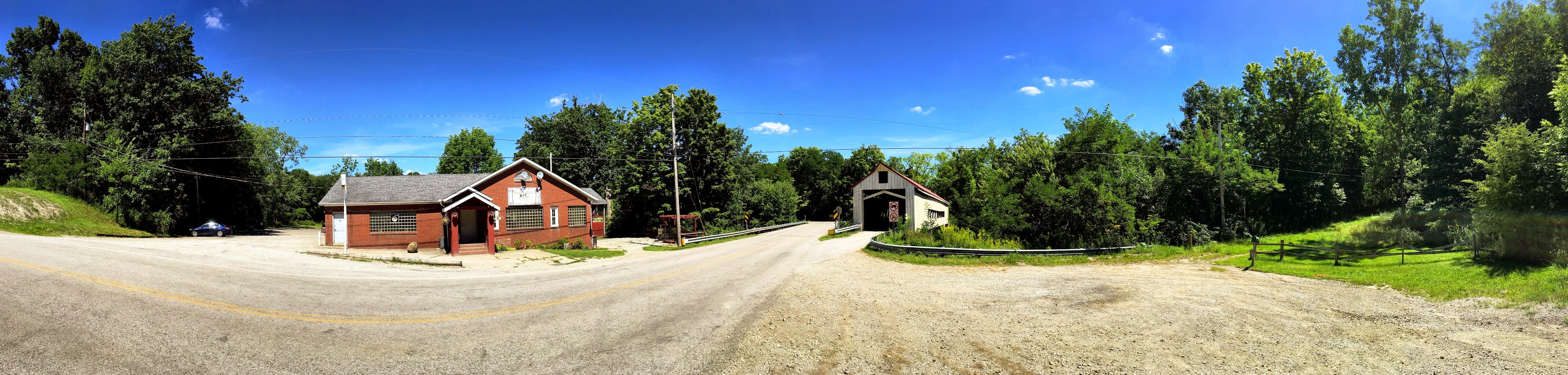
A Panoramic View of Mechanicsville Road Covered Bridge in August 2016

== See also ==
- List of Ashtabula County covered bridges
