= Middle Road Covered Bridge =

Middle Road Bridge
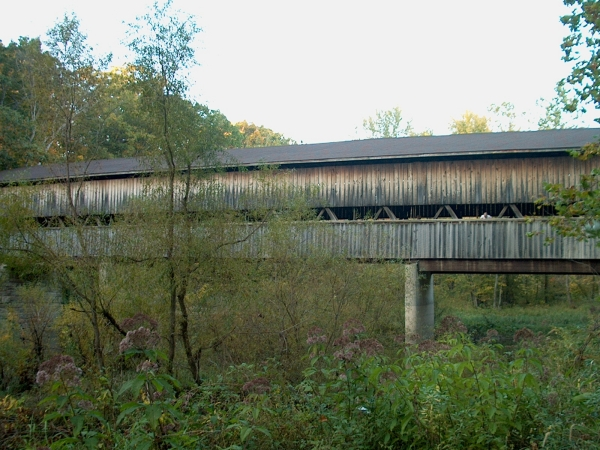
- Coordinates: 41°54′07″N 80°32′49″W
- Locale: Ashtabula County, Ohio, United States

Characteristics
- Design: single span, Howe truss
- Total length: 136 feet (41.5 m)

History
- Construction start: 1868

Location
- Interactive map of Middle Road Bridge

Middle Road Bridge is a covered bridge spanning Conneaut Creek in Conneaut, Ashtabula County, Ohio, United States. The bridge, one of currently 16 drivable bridges in the county, is a single span Howe truss design. Built in 1868, it was reconstructed in 1984 with the help of three volunteers and four college students. The bridge’s WGCB number is 35-04-06, and it is located approximately 3.2 mi (5.1 km) south of downtown Conneaut. It is 136 feet (41.5 m) long.

The bridge runs from the Northwest to the Southeast.

== Gallery ==
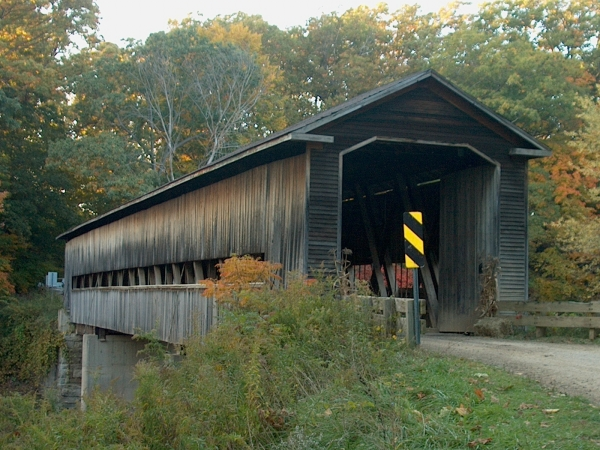
View of bridge - Southeast side

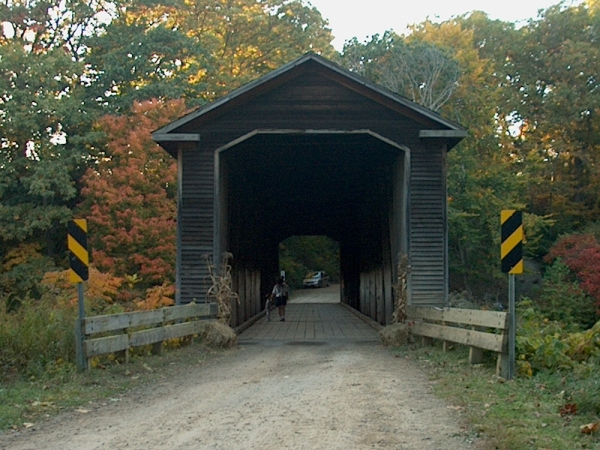
View of Northwest approach

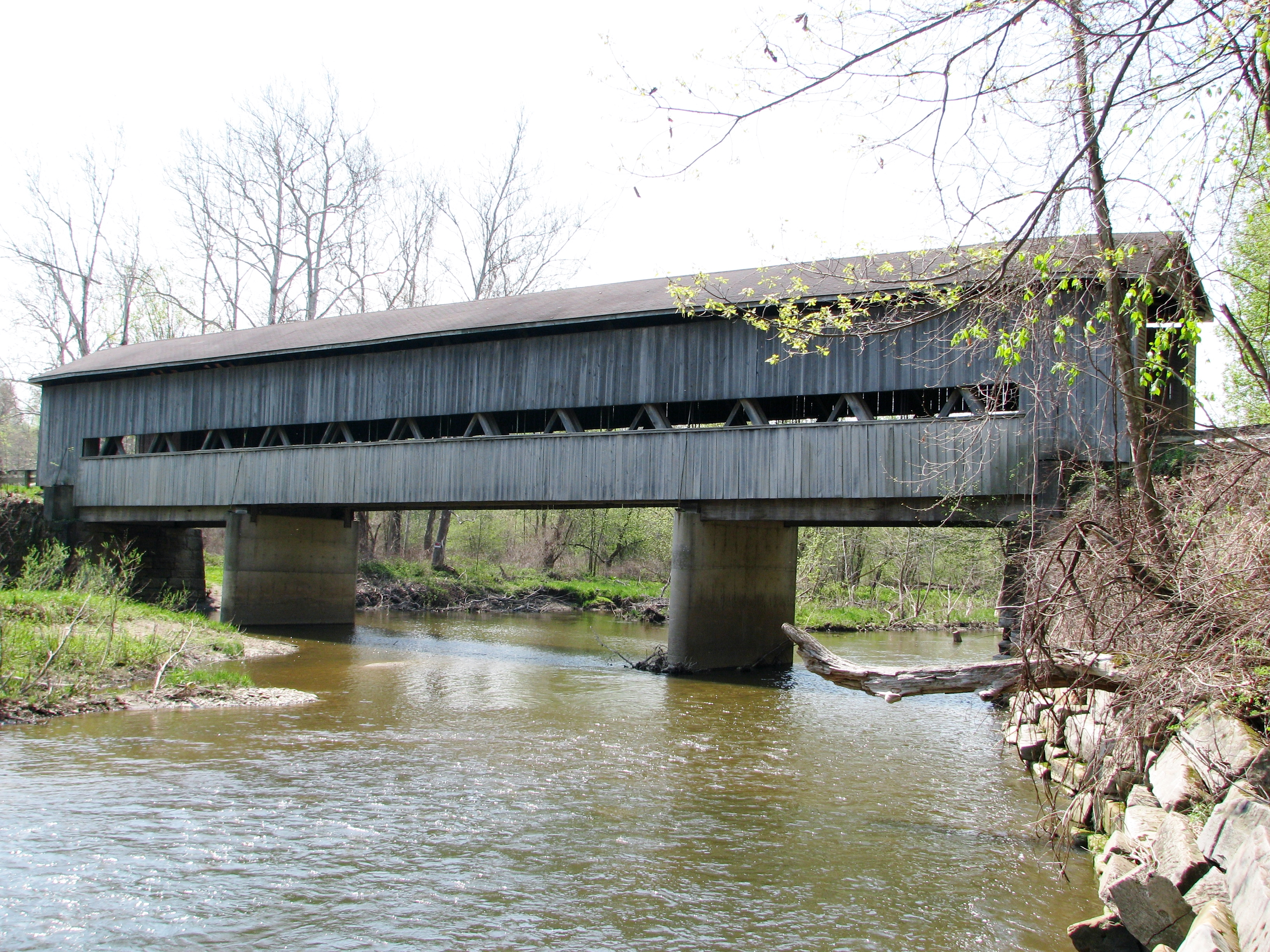

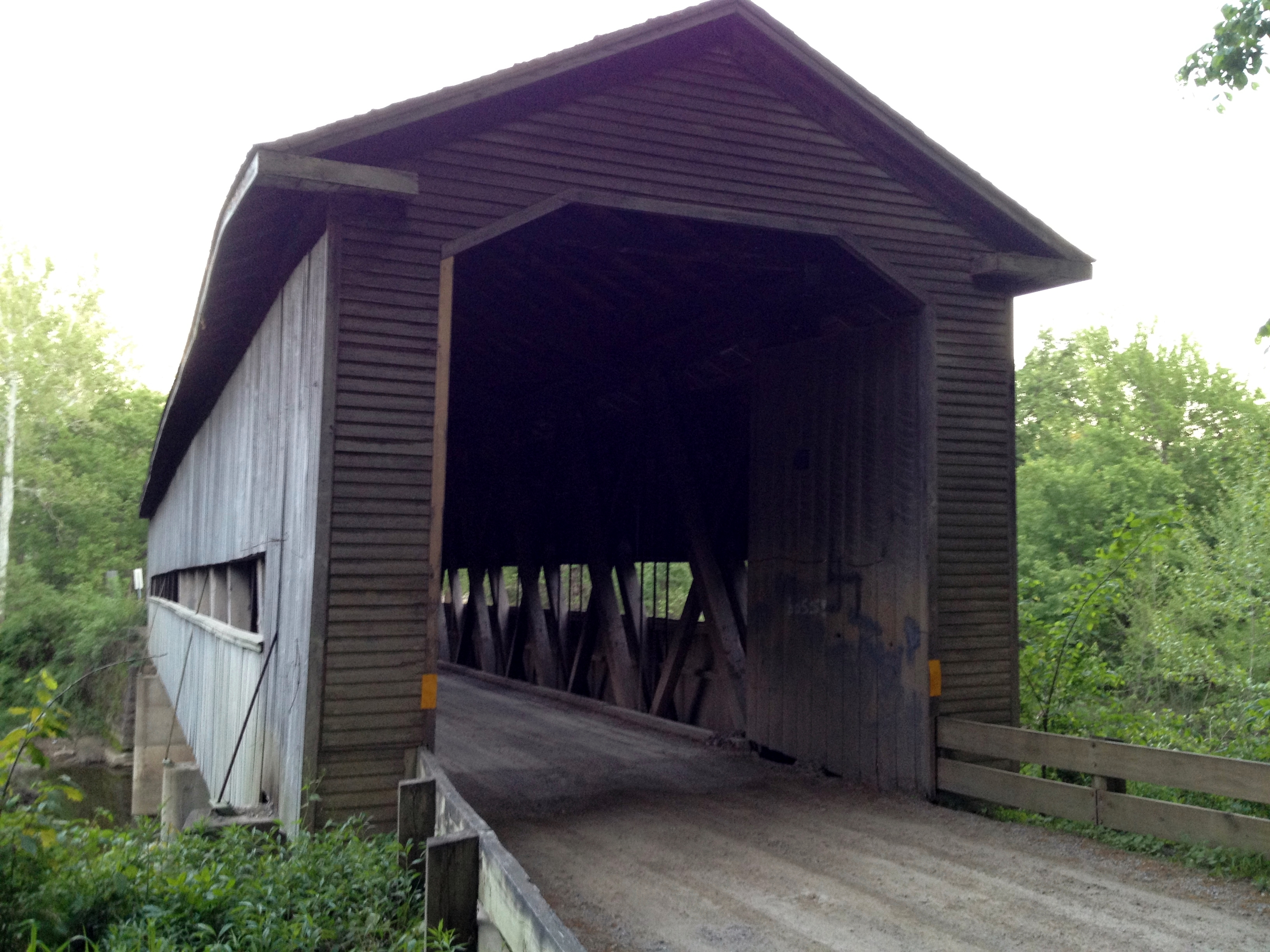

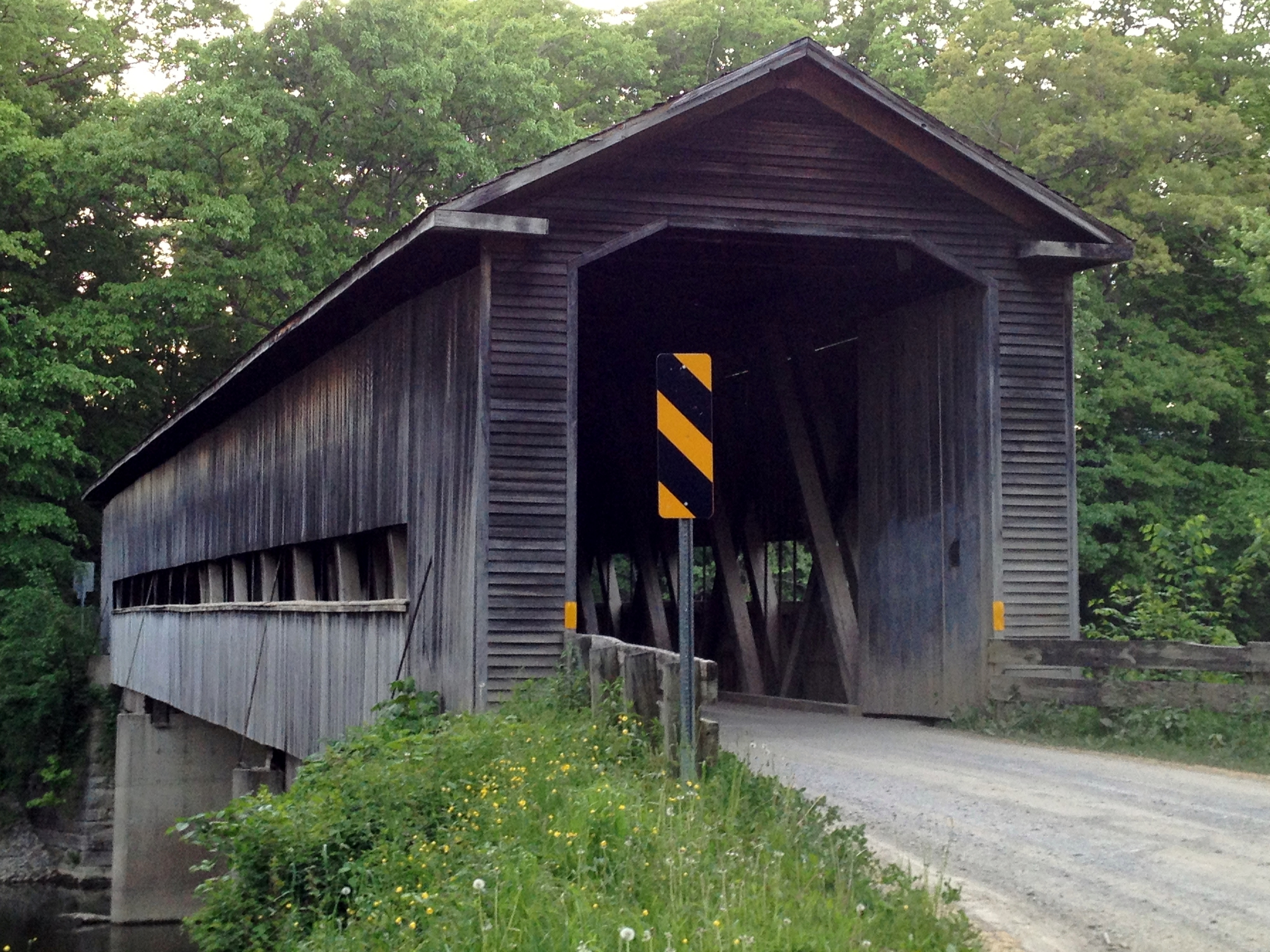

== See also ==
- List of Ashtabula County covered bridges
