= List of bridges on the National Register of Historic Places in Ohio =

This is a list of bridges and tunnels on the National Register of Historic Places in the U.S. state of Ohio.

Name	Image	Built	Listed	Location	County	Type
"S" Bridge II		1828	1973-04-23	New Concord; 39°59′35″N 81°44′48″W	Muskingum	
Adams Covered Bridge		1875	1999-02-05	Malta; 39°37′27″N 82°1′58″W	Morgan	Covered bridge
B & O Railroad Viaduct		1871	1976-06-22	Bellaire; 40°0′47″N 80°44′40″W	Belmont	Roman-arched Viaduct
Ballard Road Covered Bridge		1883	1975-05-29	Jamestown; 39°40′41″N 83°48′55″W	Greene	Howe Truss
Barkhurst Mill Covered Bridge		1872	1999-02-05	Chesterhill; 39°30′10″N 81°50′3″W	Morgan	Covered bridge
Bell Covered Bridge		1888	2012-10-3	Vincent; 39°25′52″N 81°40′34″W	Washington	
Belle Hall Covered Bridge		1879	1976-10-22	Croton; 40°14′8″N 82°38′26″W	Licking	Multiple kingpost truss plan
Bennett Schoolhouse Road Covered Bridge		1867	1978-10-11	Minford; 38°49′45″N 82°48′26″W	Scioto	King post truss
Bergstresser Covered Bridge	Bergstresser Covered Bridge	1887	1974-05-03	Canal Winchester; 39°49′48″N 82°49′0″W	Franklin	Partridge truss
Black River Viaduct, Baltimore And Ohio Railroad		1890, 1892	1976-05-06	Lodi; 41°1′38″N 82°2′29″W	Medina	
Blackwood Covered Bridge		1881	1978-06-23	Athens; 39°11′50″N 81°58′29″W	Athens	King post truss, covered
Blaine Hill "S" Bridge	Milestone on Blaine Hill "S" Bridge	1828	2010-03-17	Blane	Belmont	
Bowman Mill Covered Bridge		ca. 1880	1978-02-08	New Reading; 39°47′53″N 82°21′40″W	Perry	Multiple kingpost truss
John Bright Covered Bridge	John Bright Covered Bridge	1881	1975-05-28	Baltimore; 39°49′50″N 82°40′23″W	Fairfield	One-Span Combination Truss; Moved to Ohio University-Lancaster
Broadway Bridge		1909	1996-02-22	Greenville; 40°6′15″N 84°38′5″W	Darke	Three-hinged arch
Brubaker Covered Bridge	Brubaker Covered Bridge	1887	1975-06-11	Gratis; 39°39′6″N 84°32′39″W	Preble	One-span Childs truss
Buckeye Furnace Covered Bridge		1872	1975-02-24	Wellston; 39°3′16″N 82°27′35″W	Jackson	Smith Truss
Byer Covered Bridge		ca. 1870	1975-10-21	Byer; 39°10′46″N 82°37′52″W	Jackson	Smith Truss
Caledonia Bowstring Bridge		1873, 1976	1978-05-23	Caledonia; 40°38′33″N 82°57′56″W	Marion	Bowstring arch-truss
Chambers Road Covered Bridge	Chambers Road Covered Bridge	1874	1974-11-21	Olive Green; 40°20′17″N 82°49′5″W	Delaware	Childs Truss
Christman Covered Bridge	Christman Covered Bridge	1895	1976-10-22	Eaton; 39°46′13″N 84°39′20″W	Preble	One-span Childs truss
Church Hill Road Covered Bridge	Church Hill Road Covered Bridge	ca. 1870, 1982	1975-06-11	Lisbon; 40°47′14″N 80°43′29″W	Columbiana	
Cincinnati and Whitewater Canal Tunnel	Cincinnati and Whitewater Canal Tunnel, Cleves portal	1837, 1846	2001-05-25	Cleves; 39°9′18″N 84°44′58″W	Hamilton	Brick lined canal tunnel
Cleveland and Pittsburgh Railroad Bridge		1864	1975-07-24	Bedford; 41°23′5″N 81°32′3″W	Cuyahoga	Viaduct
Covington and Cincinnati Suspension Bridge		1856, 1867	1975-05-15	Cincinnati; 39°5′32″N 84°30′34″W	Hamilton	Suspension bridge
Dean Road Bridge		1898	1978-11-28	Birmingham, South Amherst; 41°20′56″N 82°20′41″W	Erie, Lorain	Pratt truss
Detroit Avenue Bridge		1910	1973-02-23	Rocky River-Lakewood; 41°28′57″N 81°49′53″W	Cuyahoga	
Detroit-Superior High Level Bridge		1917	1974-01-18	Cleveland; 41°29′39″N 81°42′9″W	Cuyahoga	Double-deck bridge
Dey Road Bridge		1906	1999-02-05	Defiance; 41°17′25″N 84°23′8″W	Defiance	Pratt through truss bridge
Dresden Suspension Bridge	Dresden Suspension Bridge	1914	1978-12-01	Dresden; 40°7′14″N 82°0′1″W	Muskingum	Warren truss
Eagle Creek Covered Bridge		1875	1975-12-06	Decatur; 38°46′11″N 83°42′54″W	Brown	Smith Truss Covered Bridge
Eakin Mill Covered Bridge		1870, 1871	1976-03-16	Arbaugh; 39°10′16″N 82°20′13″W	Vinton	Kingpost truss
Eldean Covered Bridge	Eldean Covered Bridge	1860	1975-02-20	Troy; 40°4′40″N 84°13′0″W	Miami	Long truss
Foreaker Bridge		1886, 1887	1975-06-05	Graysville; 39°39′20″N 81°7′16″W	Monroe	Kingpost truss
Geeting Covered Bridge	Geeting Covered Bridge	1894	1975-08-19	Lewisburg; 39°50′37″N 84°35′50″W	Preble	One-span Childs truss
General U.S. Grant Bridge		1927, 1939	2001-05-31	Portsmouth; 38°43′50″N 82°59′49″W	Scioto	Cable suspension bridge NRHP bridge has been replaced and it is no longer extant.
Harpersfield Covered Bridge		1873	1975-11-03	Harpersfield; 41°45′22″N 80°56′40″W	Ashtabula	Howe truss covered bridge
Harra Covered Bridge	Harra Covered Bridge	ca. 1875	1976-10-08	Watertown; 39°29′16″N 81°38′53″W	Washington	Long truss
Harshaville Covered Bridge	Harshaville Covered Bridge	1855	1976-03-16	Harshaville; 38°54′28″N 83°32′40″W	Adams	Burr truss covered bridge
Harshman Covered Bridge	Harshman Covered Bridge	1894	1976-09-29	Fairhaven; 39°42′9″N 84°46′10″W	Preble	One-Span Childs Truss
Helmick Covered Bridge		1863	1975-06-18	Blissfield; 40°23′35″N 81°56′34″W	Coshocton	Two-Span Wooden Truss
Helmick Mill Covered Bridge		1867	1999-02-05	Malta; 39°43′11″N 81°56′32″W	Morgan	Covered bridge
Hildreth Covered Bridge	Hildreth Covered Bridge	1878, ca. 1881	1978-02-08	Marietta; 39°25′38″N 81°21′42″W	Washington	Howe truss
Jediah Hill Covered Bridge		1850	1973-03-28	Cincinnati; 39°15′21″N 84°32′58″W	Hamilton	Queenpost Truss
Hizey Covered Bridge		1891	1976-10-08	Pickerington; 39°53′53″N 82°40′9″W	Fairfield	Burr Truss
Huffman Covered Bridge		1914	1975-03-04	Middleburg; 39°39′37″N 81°22′13″W	Noble	Kingpost truss
Hune Covered Bridge	Hune Covered Bridge	1879	1976-10-08	Dart; 39°30′38″N 81°15′2″W	Washington	Long Truss
Ida Street Viaduct		1931	1980-11-28	Cincinnati; 39°6′19″N 84°29′40″W	Hamilton	
Interurban Bridge		1908	1972-06-19	Waterville; 41°29′11″N 83°43′42″W	Lucas, Wood	Reinforced concrete bridge
John Bright No. 1 Iron Bridge	John Bright No. 1 Iron Bridge	ca. 1885	1978-09-20	Carroll; 39°49′45″N 82°40′27″W	Fairfield	One-Span Steel Eye-Bar
Johnson Road Covered Bridge		ca. 1870	1984-08-23	Petersburg; 38°57′31″N 82°47′16″W	Jackson	Single span wooden truss
Kidwell Covered Bridge		1880	1977-04-11	Truetown; 39°27′21″N 82°6′13″W	Athens	Howe truss covered bridge
Kirker Covered Bridge		ca. 1865-70	1975-10-29	West Union; 38°47′3″N 83°36′13″W	Adams	Kingpost truss bridge, named for Ohio's second governor
Knowlton Covered Bridge		ca. 1860, ca. 1890	1980-03-11	Rinard Mills; 39°36′4″N 81°9′26″W	Monroe	Burr arch truss bridge
Lockington Covered Bridge		1848	1975-06-10	Lockington; 40°12′4″N 84°12′58″W	Shelby	Long truss; burned in 1989
Lorain-Carnegie Bridge		1927, 1932	1976-10-08	Cleveland; 41°29′26″N 81°41′30″W	Cuyahoga	Cantilever Deck Truss bridge
Lynchburg Covered Bridge		1870	1976-03-16	Lynchburg; 39°14′42″N 83°47′40″W	Clinton, Highland	
Mark Road Bridge		1883	1990-07-26	Staunton; 39°29′13″N 83°28′23″W	Fayette	Pratt through truss
Market Street Bridge		1905	2019-03-21	Steubenville; 40°21′28.0″N 80°36′29.0″W	Jefferson	Suspension
Martinsville Road Covered Bridge		1871	1974-09-10	Martinsville; 39°19′47″N 83°50′6″W	Clinton	Multiple kingpost
Moonville Tunnel		1857	2021-03-22	Zaleski; 39°18′26.3″N 82°19′20.3″W	Vinton	
Maysville-Aberdeen Bridge		1931	1983-6-30	Aberdeen; 38°39′19″N 83°45′27″W	Brown	Spans the Ohio River between Aberdeen and Maysville, Kentucky
McColly Covered Bridge		1876	1975-05-28	Bloom Center; 40°24′3″N 83°55′27″W	Logan	Howe truss covered bridge
Mill Creek Park Suspension Bridge	Mill Creek Park Suspension Bridge	1895	1976-10-29	Youngstown; 41°4′24″N 80°41′21″W	Mahoning	
Mill Road Bowstring Bridge	Mill Road Bowstring Bridge	ca. 1876	1979-12-05	Bladensburg; 40°16′35″N 82°16′22″W	Knox	Bow-string arch-truss
Mt. Olive Road Covered Bridge		1875	1976-10-08	Allensville; 39°17′10″N 82°35′21″W	Vinton	Queenpost truss
Mull Covered Bridge		1851	1974-10-15	Burgoon; 41°15′38″N 83°11′4″W	Sandusky	Town Lattice truss
Newport and Cincinnati Bridge		1868, 1872, 1896	2001-04-17	Cincinnati; 39°6′3″N 84°30′2″W	Hamilton	Subdivided Pratt truss
Newton Falls Covered Bridge	Newton Falls Covered Bridge	1831	1974-10-16	Newton Falls; 41°11′17″N 80°58′17″W	Trumbull	Town latice truss
Ohio State Route 51 Bridge Over the Portage River		1926	1994-4-16	Elmore; 41°28′37″N 83°17′44″W	Ottawa	Closed spandral arch
Old Enon Road Stone Arch Culvert	Old Enon Road Stone Arch Culvert	1871	2009-03-17	Enon; 39°52′10.36″N 83°52′45.94″W	Clark	
O'Shaughnessy Dam and Bridge	O'Shaughenessy Dam and Bridge	1922, 1925	1990-07-05	Shawnee Hills; 40°9′13″N 83°8′14″W	Delaware	Second Renaissance Revival
Otway Covered Bridge	Otway Covered Bridge	1874	1974-05-03	Otway; 38°51′46″N 83°11′24″W	Scioto	
Palos Covered Bridge		1876	1977-11-11	Glouster; 39°31′31″N 82°4′19″W	Athens	Multiple kingpost truss
Parker Covered Bridge		1873	1975-03-31	Upper Sandusky; 40°54′11″N 83°14′41″W	Wyandot	Howe Truss
Parks Covered Bridge		1883	1974-09-10	Chalfunts; 39°51′8″N 82°16′46″W	Perry	Multiple kingpost truss
Ponn Humpback Covered Bridge		1874	1973-04-11	Wilkesville; 39°2′52″N 82°22′35″W	Vinton	Burr arch
Pugh's Mill Covered Bridge		ca. 1869	1975-06-05	Oxford; 39°31′26″N 84°44′6″W	Butler	Two-Span Wooden Truss
Reed Covered Bridge		1884	1975-03-04	Marysville; 40°8′59″N 83°22′50″W	Union	Partridge truss
Rinard Covered Bridge		1876	1976-10-08	Marietta; 39°32′12″N 81°13′23″W	Washington	Smith truss
Roberts Covered Bridge	Roberts Covered Bridge	1829	1971-09-03	Eaton; 39°42′41″N 84°37′15″W	Preble	Burr Arch & Truss
Rock Mill Covered Bridge		1901	1976-04-26	Rock Mill; 39°44′56″N 82°42′48″W	Fairfield	Queen Post Truss
Rockefeller Park Bridges	Rockefeller Park Bridge	1897, 1907	1977-09-27	Cleveland	Cuyahoga	Richardsonian bridge
Rodrick Bridge		1872	1998-05-22	Newark; 40°4′5″N 82°26′26″W	Licking	Whipple bowstring truss probably moved from Coshocton County
Root Covered Bridge	Root Covered Bridge	1878	1975-03-27	Decaturville; 39°20′33″N 81°45′16″W	Washington	Long truss
S Bridge, National Road		1828	1966-10-15	Old Washington; 40°2′43″N 81°22′27″W	Guernsey	Single span arch
Salt Creek Covered Bridge	Salt Creek Covered Bridge	1876	1974-09-10	Norwich; 39°59′55″N 81°50′24″W	Muskingum	Warren truss
Scottown Covered Bridge		1874	1975-11-12	Scottown; 38°32′52″N 82°22′49″W	Lawrence	Multiple Kingpost
Shinn Covered Bridge	Shinn Covered Bridge	1886	1976-10-08	Bartlett; 39°27′46″N 81°45′40″W	Washington	Burr arch truss bridge
Sidaway Bridge		1930	2022-10-03	Cleveland; 41°28′47.3″N 81°38′32.3″W	Cuyahoga	Suspension
Smith Road Bridge	Smith Road Bridge	1890	1980-10-07	Bucyrus; 40°55′37″N 83°2′8″W	Crawford	Bowstring Arch Truss
South Salem Covered Bridge	South Salem Covered Bridge	1873	1975-03-04	South Salem; 39°20′3″N 83°18′52″W	Ross	Smith truss
St. Clair Street Bridge		1886, 1887	1978-09-21	Eaton; 39°44′24″N 84°38′19″W	Preble	Pratt metal through-truss
Station Road Bridge	Station Road Bridge	1882	1979-03-07	Brecksville; 41°19′10″N 81°35′16″W	Summit, Cuyahoga	Pratt Whipple Truss
Stonelick Covered Bridge	Stonelick Covered Bridge	1878	1974-09-10	Perintown; 39°7′52″N 84°11′14″W	Clermont	Howe Truss Covered Bridge
Sumner Street Bridge		1904	2024-08-26	Toledo; 41°38′16.1″N 83°32′40.2″W	Lucas	Pratt through Bridge
Superior Avenue Viaduct		1878	1978-06-09	Cleveland; 41°29′41″N 81°42′16″W	Cuyahoga	Roman Arch Viaduct
Swartz Covered Bridge	Swartz Covered Bridge	1880	1976-10-08	Wyandot; 40°46′14″N 83°10′9″W	Wyandot	Howe truss
Teegarden-Centennial Covered Bridge	Teegarden=Centennial Covered Bridge	1875	2000-08-10	Salem; 40°49′18″N 80°49′38″W	Columbiana	Covered bridge
Third Street Bridge	Third Street Bridge	ca. 1885, 1913	1978-05-05	Canton; 40°47′37″N 81°21′30″W	Stark	Pratt through truss
Twin Arch Stone Culvert		1837, 1913	1978-07-17	Troy; 40°5′16″N 84°13′24″W	Miami	
Warnke Covered Bridge		1895	1976-10-08	Lewisburg; 39°52′26″N 84°30′53″W	Preble	One-span Childs truss
West Fifth Street Bridge		1925	1985-08-23	Ashtabula; 41°54′1″N 80°47′53″W	Ashtabula	Single leaf bascule
West Orange Road-Thomas Bridge	West Orange Road - Thomas Bridge	1898, 1913	2002-06-26	Powell; 40°10′31″N 83°2′44″W	Delaware	Pratt through Truss
White Bridge	White Bridge	1877	1983-12-11	Poland Village; 41°1′37″N 80°36′48″W	Mahoning	Oval tubular Arch Bowstring
Wiswell Road Covered Bridge		1867, 1868	1973-04-11	Windsor Mills; 41°31′59″N 80°57′50″W	Ashtabula	Town lattice truss
Y Bridge		1902	1973-11-02	Zanesville; 39°56′25″N 82°0′48″W	Muskingum	
Zenas King Bowstring Bridge		1879	2021-11-29	Sidney; 40°17′19.0″N 84°07′39.7″W	Shelby	Bowstring pony truss
Zoarville Bridge		1868, 1905	1997-03-13	Zoarville; 40°34′38″N 81°23′30″W	Tuscarawas	Fink truss bridge
Blacklick Covered Bridge		1888	destroyed by overloaded dump truck 1978-01-01	Pickerington	Fairfield	Howe truss
Everett Road Covered Bridge		ca. 1873, 1877	removed 1985-10-29	Peninsula	Summit	Smith truss
Germantown Covered Bridge	Germantown Covered Bridge	1870	removed 1999-01-01	Germantown	Montgomery	Inverted bowstring bridge
Loucks Covered Bridge		1871	removed 1985-10-29	Canal Winchester	Fairfield	Burr Truss
Stemen Road Covered Bridge		1888	removed 1985-10-29	Pickerington	Fairfield	Howe Truss
Turtle Creek Culvert and Embankment		1837, 1842	removed 1985-10-29	New Bern	Shelby	
