= List of covered bridges in Ohio =

This is a list of Ohio covered bridges. There are over 125 historic wooden covered bridges in the U.S. state of Ohio. Many are still in use. Ashtabula County has 19 covered bridges, including a lattice truss bridge. Fairfield County has 18 covered bridges. The Smolen–Gulf Bridge, at 613 feet, is currently the longest multi-span covered bridge in the United States. The West Liberty Covered Bridge, at 18 feet, has been called the shortest covered bridge in the United States. The list below is not comprehensive.

== List of covered bridges ==
Name	Image	Location (in Ohio)	County	Year built	Notes
Adams Covered Bridge		San Toy	Perry	1875 Rebuilt 2013	Also called San Toy Covered Bridge
Arlington Boulevard Covered Bridge		Newton Falls	Trumbull	1831	also called Newton Falls Covered Bridge, over East Branch Mahoning River; second oldest covered bridge in Ohio, uses a Town lattice truss
Armstrong Covered Bridge		Cambridge	Guernsey	1849	Also called Clio Covered Bridge. Located in Cambridge Park
Baker Covered Bridge		West Rushville	Fairfield	1871	also called R.F. Baker Bridge
Ballard Road Covered Bridge		Jasper Township	Greene	1883	
Barkhurst Mill Covered Bridge		Marion Township	Morgan	1872	also known as Williams Covered Bridge
Bay Covered Bridge		McArthur	Vinton	1876	also known as Tinker Covered Bridge
Bell Covered Bridge		Barlow Township	Washington	1888	
Belle Hall Covered Bridge			Licking		
Benetka Road Covered Bridge		Gageville	Ashtabula	1900	Over the Ashtabula River
Bigelow Bridge		Over the Little Darby Creek	Union	1873	
Blackwood Covered Bridge		Over the Middle Branch of the Shade River	Athens	1881	This is a bridge over the Middle Branch of the Shade River in Lodi Township. It is on Blackwood Road (County Road 46) just east of its intersection with Zion Road (Lodi Township Road 76). It is approximately seventy feet long. It sits higher above the water than the other two bridges in Athens County.
Blanchard River Covered Bridge		Marion	Hancock	2009	Over the Blanchard River
Bridge of Dreams		Brinkhaven	Knox	1998	Over the Mohican River
Brown Bridge		New Hope	Brown	1880	Over the White Oak Creek
Brubaker Bridge		Gratis	Preble	1887	Over Sims Run Creek
Buckeye Bridge		Millersport	Fairfield		
Bergstresser/Dietz Covered Bridge		Canal Winchester	Franklin	1887	Over Walnut Creek
Byer Covered Bridge			Jackson	c.1870	
Caine Road Covered Bridge		Pierpont Township	Ashtabula	1986	Over the West Branch of the Ashtabula River
Charlton Mill Road Bridge		Wilberforce	Greene	1883, rebuilt 2013	Over Massies Creek
Christman Bridge		Eaton	Preble	1895	Over Sevenmile Creek
Dixon Branch Covered Bridge		Lewisburg	Preble	1887	Moved from Salem Road (1/4 mile south) over Twin Creek
Doyle Road Covered Bridge		Jefferson	Ashtabula	1876	Over Mill Creek
Eakin Mill Covered Bridge		Vinton Township	Vinton	1870, rebuilt 2003	Carries Mound Hill Road over Raccoon Creek north of Arbaugh in Vinton Township; also called Arbaugh Bridge.
Eldean Covered Bridge		Troy	Miami	1860	Spans the Great Miami River
Everett Covered Bridge		Peninsula	Summit County, Ohio	unk, rebuilt 1975	Over Furnace Run. The original construction date is unknown, the bridge was severely damaged in a 1913 flood and rebuilt. A 1975 storm destroyed the bridge and it was historically accurately reconstructed in 1986. Closed to vehicles.
Feedwire Covered Bridge		Dayton	Montgomery	1870	Originally this bridge was built near Bellbrook to cross the Little Sugar Creek. It was moved to the Carillon Historical Park in Dayton in 1948.
Glen Helen Covered Bridge		Yellow Springs	Greene	1886	also called Cemetery Road Covered Bridge, moved to Little Miami River in 1975
Geeting Covered Bridge		Lewisburg	Preble	1894	Over Price Creek
George Miller Road Covered Bridge		Byrd Township	Brown	1879	Over the West Fork of Eagle Creek
Germantown Covered Bridge		Germantown	Montgomery	1865	Bowstring suspension bridge of iron over Little Twin Creek
Giddings Road Covered Bridge		Jefferson Township	Ashtabula	1995	Over Mill Creek
Graham Road Covered Bridge		Pierpont Township	Ashtabula	1867 (restored 1913)	Defunct bridge; formerly spanned the west bank of the Ashtabula River, currently located at an Ashtabula County MetroPark.
Hanaway Covered Bridge		Madison Township	Fairfield	1901	also called Clearport Covered Bridge, over Clear Creek
Harpersfield Covered Bridge		Harperfield	Ashtabula	1868	Over the Grand River
Harshman Covered Bridge		Eaton	Preble	1894	Over Four Mile Creek
Hartman Number Two Covered Bridge		Lockville	Fairfield	1888	also called Lockville Park Covered Bridge, Over the Ohio Canal
Helmick Covered Bridge		Clark Township	Coshocton	1863	About 1.5 mile east of Blissfield
Hildreth Covered Bridge		Newport Township	Washington	1863	About 1.5 mile east of Blissfield
Hueston Woods Covered Bridge		Near College Corner	Preble	2012	over Four Mile Creek, at Hueston Woods State Park
Hune Covered Bridge		Lawrence Township	Washington	1879	Carries Cullen Road over the Little Muskingum River south of Wingett Run in Lawrence Township.
Hyde Road Covered Bridge		Miami	Greene	2014	Also called Richard P. Eastman Covered Bridge
Island Run Bridge		York Township	Morgan	1867	also called Helmick Run Covered Bridge, Multiple Kingpost bridge over Island Run
Jediah Hill Covered Bridge		Springfield Township	Hamilton	1850	
Jim McClellan Covered Bridge		Center	Columbiana	2016	Over the west fork of Little Beaver Creek; replaced bridge built in 1879
John Bright Covered Bridge		Lancaster	Fairfield	1881	Over Fetters Run
Johnson Road Covered Bridge		Scioto Township	Jackson	1870	The Johnson Road Covered Bridge carries Johnson Road over the Brushy Fork of the Little Scioto River near Petersburg in southwestern Scioto Township. Built in 1870, it is listed on the National Register of Historic Places.
Johnston Covered Bridge		Revenge, Madison Township	Fairfield	1887	Howe truss over Clear creek
Jon Raab Covered Bridge		Colfax	Fairfield	1891	
Kidwell Covered Bridge		Over Sunday Creek near Redtown, Ohio	Athens		This covered bridge is located in Dover Township, on Monserat Ridge Road close to its intersection with Ohio State Route 685; Monserat Ridge Road also intersects with Ohio State Route 13 close by. The bridge spans Sunday Creek. This bridge is just southwest of the unincorporated community of Redtown, Ohio and northeast of the unincorporated community of Truetown, Ohio. It is approximately seventy feet long. This bridge has been stabilized, renovated and structurally strengthened by the County Engineer's Office of Athens County, Ohio; however, the bridge (as shown in the photo) is temporarily closed due to damage to overhead structural members caused by an oversize truck being driven across the bridge.
King's Mill Covered Bridge		Richland	Marion	2016	Over the Olentangy River; also called St. James Road Covered Bridge
Knowlton Covered Bridge		Rinard Mills	Monroe	1887	Also called Long Covered Bridge. Middle span collapsed in 2019, and eastern span collapsed in 2020. The bridge was rebuilt in 2024.
Lockport Covered Bridge		Lockport	Williams	1999	
Lynchburg Covered Bridge		Lynchburg	Highland and Clinton	1870	Spans the east fork of the Little Miami River
Maple Highlands Trail Covered Bridge		Middlefield	Geauga	2013	Over the east branch of the Cuyahoga River
Martinsville Road Covered Bridge		Clark Township	Clinton	1871	Spans the East Fork of Todds Fork of the Little Miami River and is 72 feet (22 m) long.
McCafferty Road Covered Bridge		Vera Cruz	Brown	1877	Over the East Fork of the Little Miami River
McCleery Covered Bridge		Lancaster	Fairfield	1864	
Mechanicsville Road Covered Bridge		Mechanicsville	Ashtabula	1867	Over the Grand River
Middle Road Covered Bridge		Conneaut	Ashtabula	1868	Over Conneaut Creek
Mill Creek Covered Bridge		Millcreek	Union	2010	Over Mill Creek
Mink Hollow Covered Bridge		Madison Township	Fairfield	1887	Over Arney Run
Mull Covered Bridge		Fremont	Sandusky	1851	Over Wolf Creek, Made obsolete by new bridge in 1962 and closed to traffic.
Netcher Road Covered Bridge		Jefferson Township	Ashtabula	1999	
New Hope Covered Bridge		New Hope	Brown	1878	Replaced the 1872 bridge over White Oak Creek
North Pole Road Covered Bridge		Ripley	Brown	1865	also called Iron Bridge, over Eagle Creek; closed, bypassed 2019
Olin's Covered Bridge		Ashtabula	Ashtabula	1873	also called Dewey Road Covered Bridge, over the Ashtabula River
Palos Covered Bridge		Over Sunday Creek in Trimble Township	Athens		This structure is located on Red Rock Road, a Trimble Township road, close to its intersection with Ohio State Route 13, and is easily visible from the highway. It spans Sunday Creek and is a short distance southwest of Burr Oak State Park. It is approximately eighty feet long.
Parker Covered Bridge		Upper Sandusky	Wyandot	1873	Located in Upper Sandusky, Ohio in Wyandot County. Covered bridge over Sandusky River on CR 40A (Crane Road)
Ponn Humpback Covered Bridge			Vinton		Also called Geer Mill Covered Bridge; lost to arson on June 6, 2013
Pugh's Mill Covered Bridge		Oxford	Butler	1869	also called Black Covered Bridge, over Four Mile (Talawanda) Creek
Riverdale Road Covered Bridge		Rock Creek	Ashtabula	1874	Over the Grand River
Roberts Covered Bridge		Eaton	Preble	1829	Over Sevenmile Creek
Rock Mill Covered Bridge		Rock Mill	Fairfield	1901	Over the Hocking River
Roley School Covered Bridge		Lancaster	Fairfield	1899	At the county fair ground.
Root Road Covered Bridge		Keloggsville	Ashtabula	1868	Over the West Branch of the Ashtabula River
Scofield Covered Bridge			Brown	1875	Multiple kingpost with arch over Beetle Creek.
Shreyer Covered Bridge		west of Baltimore	Fairfield	1891	
Smolen–Gulf Bridge		Ashtabula	Ashtabula	2008	also called "Number Seventeen", Modified Pratt Truss over the Ashtabula River
South Denmark Road Covered Bridge		Denmark Corner	Ashtabula	1868	Over Mill Creek
Spellacy Covered Bridge		Loudonville	Holmes	2023	300-foot span over the Mohican River.
Stevenson Road Covered Bridge		Xenia	Greene	1877	Over Massies Creek
State Road Covered Bridge		Conneaut	Ashtabula	1983	Over Conneaut Creek
Walter F. Ehrnfelt Bridge		Strongsville	Cuyahoga	1983	Over East Branch of the Rocky River in the Mill Stream Run reservation of the Cleveland Metroparks
Stonelick Covered Bridge		Batavia	Clermont	1878	Over Stonelick creek
Stutzmann's Crossing Covered Bridge		Walnut Creek	Holmes	2009	Over Walnut Creek
Taylor Blair Covered Bridge		West Jefferson	Madison	2012	Over Little Darby Creek
Warnke Bridge		West Sonora	Preble	1895	Over Swamp Creek
West Liberty Covered Bridge		Geneva	Ashtabula	1867	Over Cowles Creek
Windsor Mills Covered Bridge		Windsor Mills	Ashtabula	1867	also known as Wiswell Road Bridge or Warner Hollow Road Bridge, Town Truss over Phelps Creek
Zeller-Smith Covered Bridge		Pickerington	Fairfield	1906	also called Sycamore Park Covered Bridge

== See also ==
- List of Ashtabula County covered bridges
- List of Ohio-related topics
- List of bridges on the National Register of Historic Places in Ohio
