= Huffman Covered Bridge =

- U.S. National Register of Historic Places
- Location within Ohio Location within the United States
- Nearest city: Middleburg, Ohio
- Coordinates: 39°39′37″N 81°22′13″W
- Area: less than one acre
- Built: 1914
- Architectural style: Kingpost truss
- NRHP reference No.: 75001513
- Added to NRHP: March 4, 1975

The Huffman Covered Bridge was built in 1914 south of Middleburg, Ohio. The property was listed on the National Register on March 4, 1975.

The wooden Kingpost truss bridge stood 50 feet long over the Middle Fork Duck Creek. The bridge stood until a devastating flood washed out the supports in 1998, carrying away the bridge. The same flood took with it six victims.
