= Hizey Covered Bridge =

- U.S. National Register of Historic Places
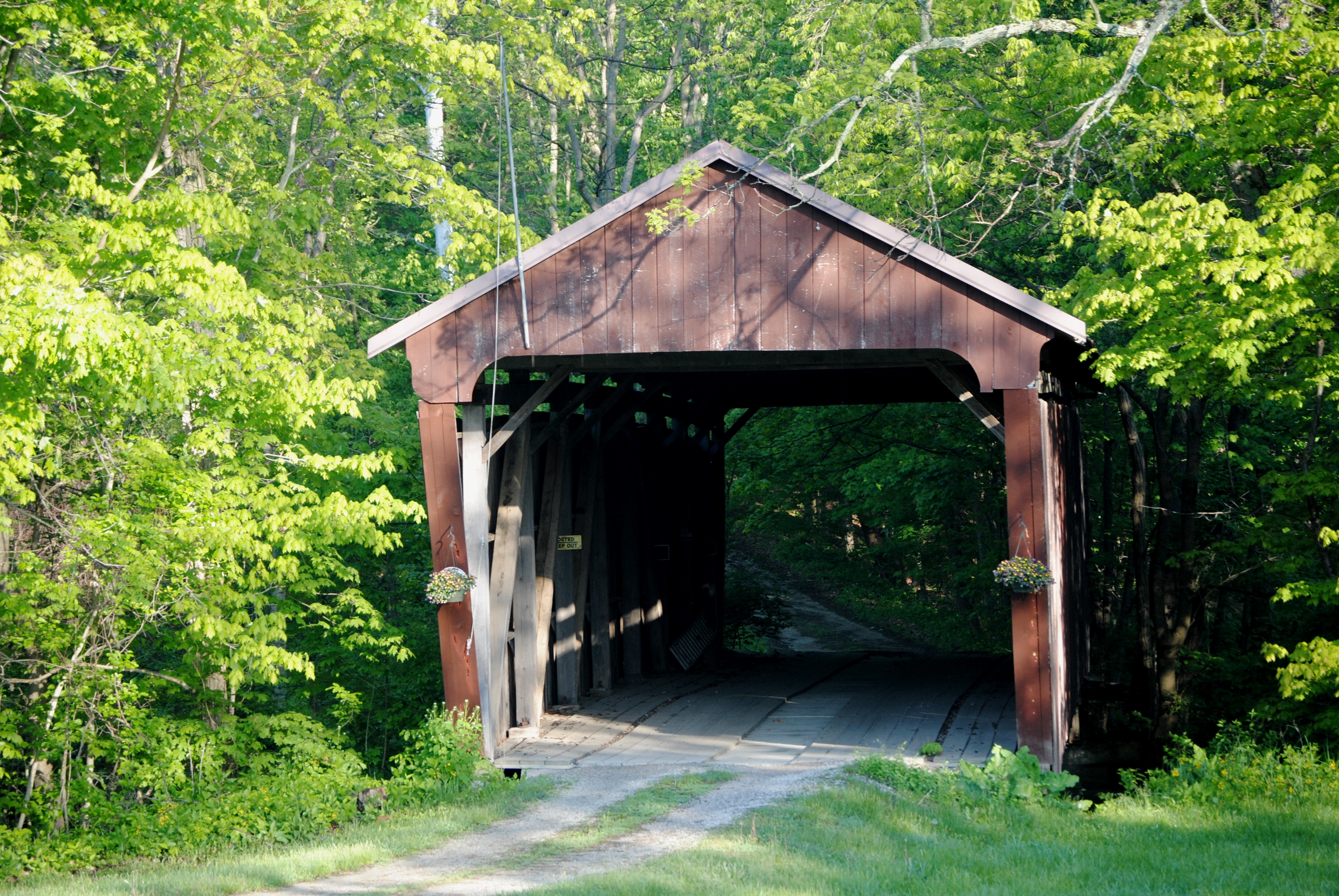

- Location within Ohio
- Nearest city: Pickerington, Ohio
- Area: less than one acre
- Built: 1891
- Built by: Buchanan, James W.
- Architectural style: Burr Truss
- NRHP reference No.: 76001423
- Added to NRHP: October 8, 1976

The Hizey Covered Bridge, in Fairfield County, Ohio, is a Burr Truss covered bridge which was built in 1891 by James W. Buchanan. It was listed on the National Register of Historic Places in 1976 when it was still located at its original location.

It was located east of Pickerington on State Route 235, bringing Poplar Creek Road across Poplar Creek, at 39.898321°N 82.668960°W.

It is 83 feet (25 m) long.

It was moved in 1979 to a private drive a few miles away. It is now located on a private drive at 12549 Tollgate Rd., crossing Sycamore Creek (at 39.9146°N 82.7092°W).

It is in Violet Township.
