= South Salem Covered Bridge =

Historic place in Ohio, United States

- U.S. National Register of Historic Places
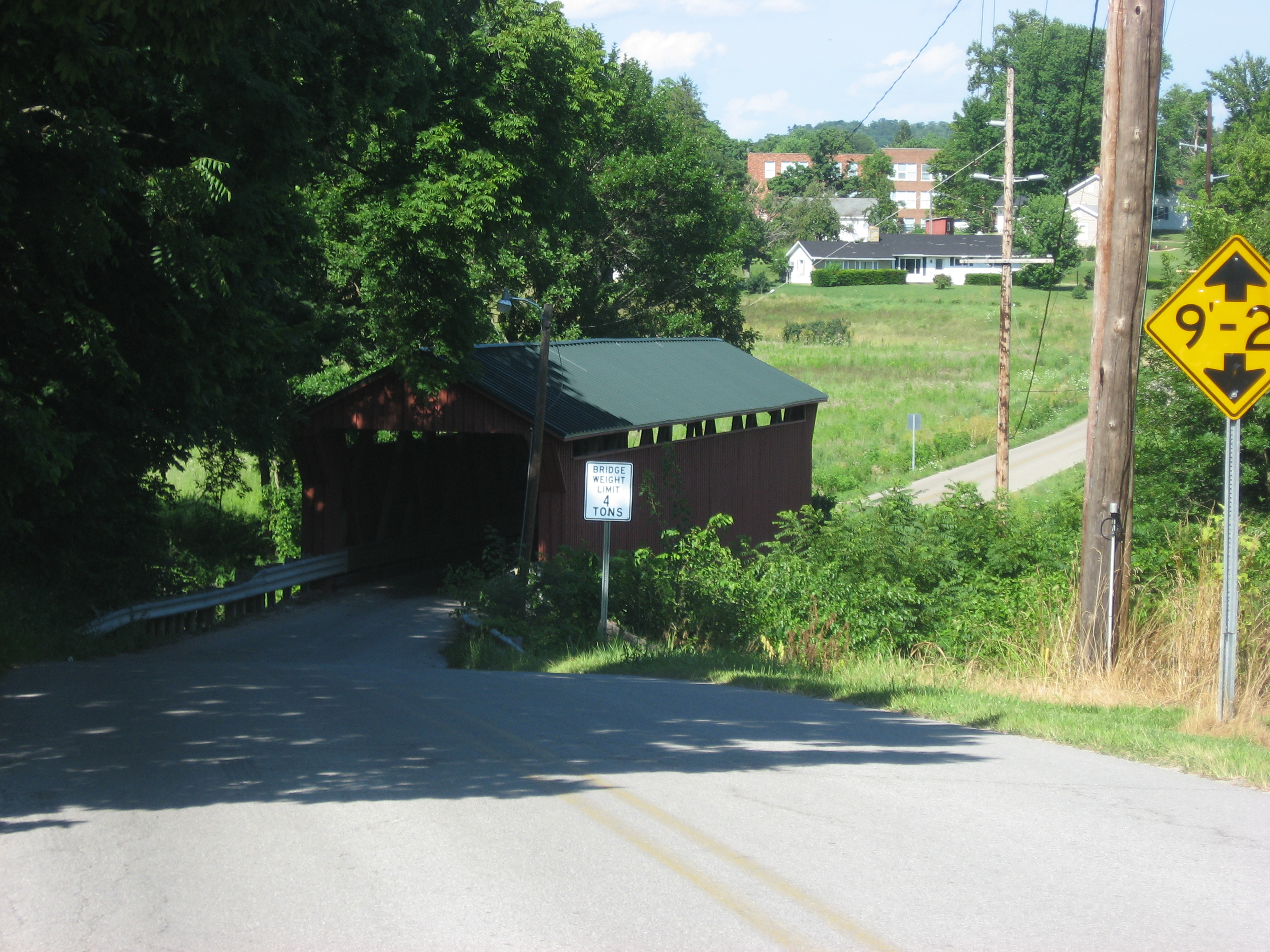
- Western end of the bridge

- Location within Ohio Location within the United States
- Nearest city: South Salem, Ohio
- Coordinates: 39°20′3″N 83°18′52″W
- Area: less than one acre
- Built: 1873
- Architect: Smith Bridge Company; Robert Matthews
- Architectural style: Smith truss
- NRHP reference No.: 75001530
- Added to NRHP: March 4, 1975

The South Salem Covered Bridge is a historic covered bridge in northwestern Ross County, Ohio, United States. It was built in the 1870s and has been designated a historic site because of its well-preserved historic engineering. Since its construction, it has carried Lower Twin Road over Buckskin Creek in Buckskin Township. The bridge is a wooden Smith truss bridge, built in 1873 according to a design patented by Ohioan Robert Smith in the late 1860s. Eight wooden panels wide, it rests on stone abutments and is covered with a metal roof.

Plaque on the bridge

In 1975, the bridge was listed on the National Register of Historic Places because of its historically significant engineering. Key to its significance is its unique status: all other covered bridges in Ross County have been destroyed, leaving the South Salem bridge standing alone.
