= North Pole Road Covered Bridge =

Bridge in Ohio, United States

Coordinates: 38°45′00″N 83°46′23″W

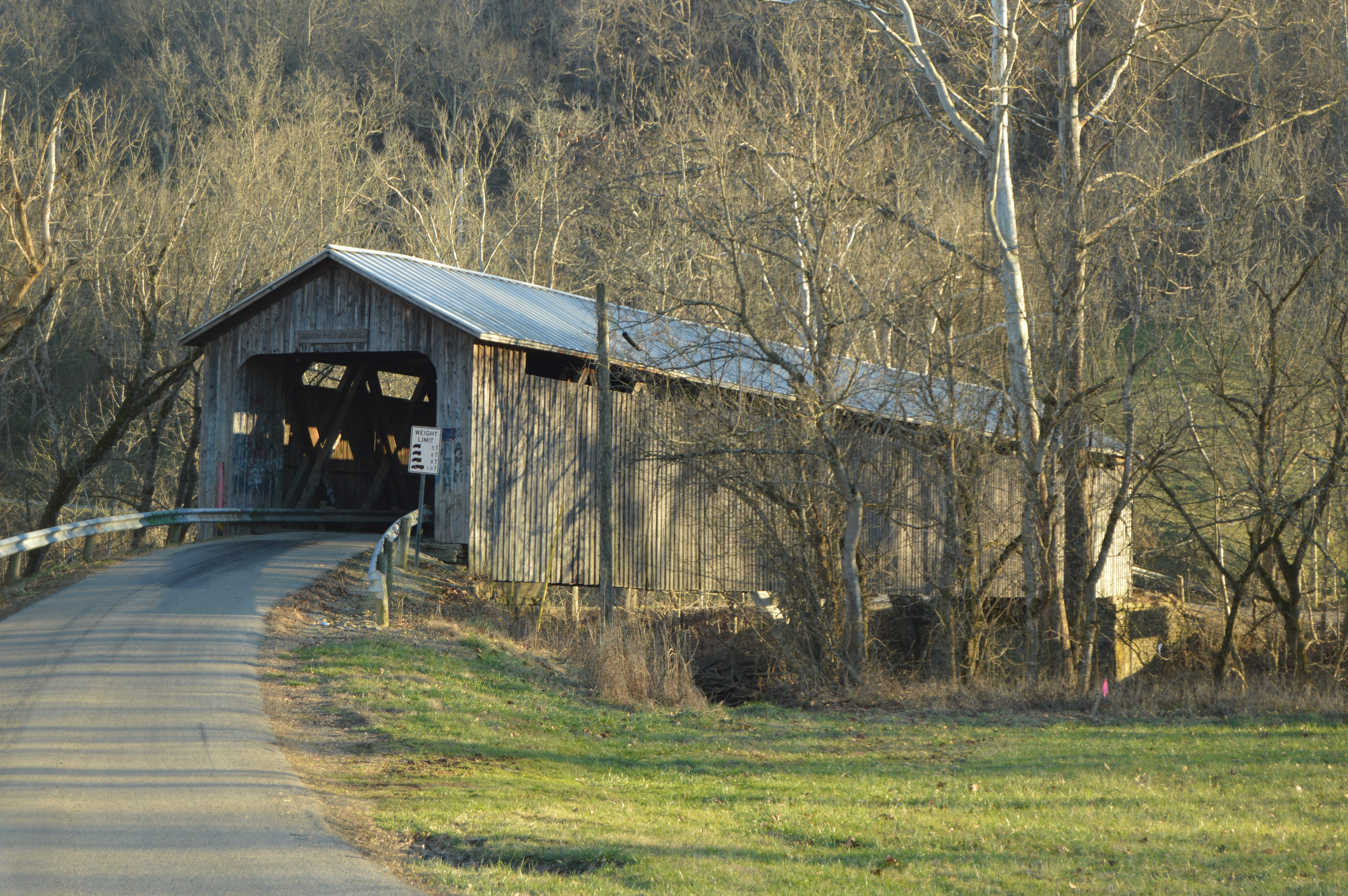
Bridge in active use, prior to traffic closure in 2019

The North Pole Road Covered Bridge is a covered bridge in rural Brown County in the U.S. state of Ohio. The 169-foot-long bridge crosses Eagle Creek approximately four miles east of the town of Ripley. Originally built in 1865, it was damaged and rebuilt after a flood in 1997.

After two final decades of active vehicular use, a modern replacement bridge was built in 2019 and the North Pole Road Covered Bridge was closed to traffic. By that date only about 125 covered bridges remained in Ohio. The North Pole bridge was preserved as a historic resource and pedestrian footpath. As of 2021 the bridge siding was colored gray.
