= West Liberty Covered Bridge =

Bridge in Ohio

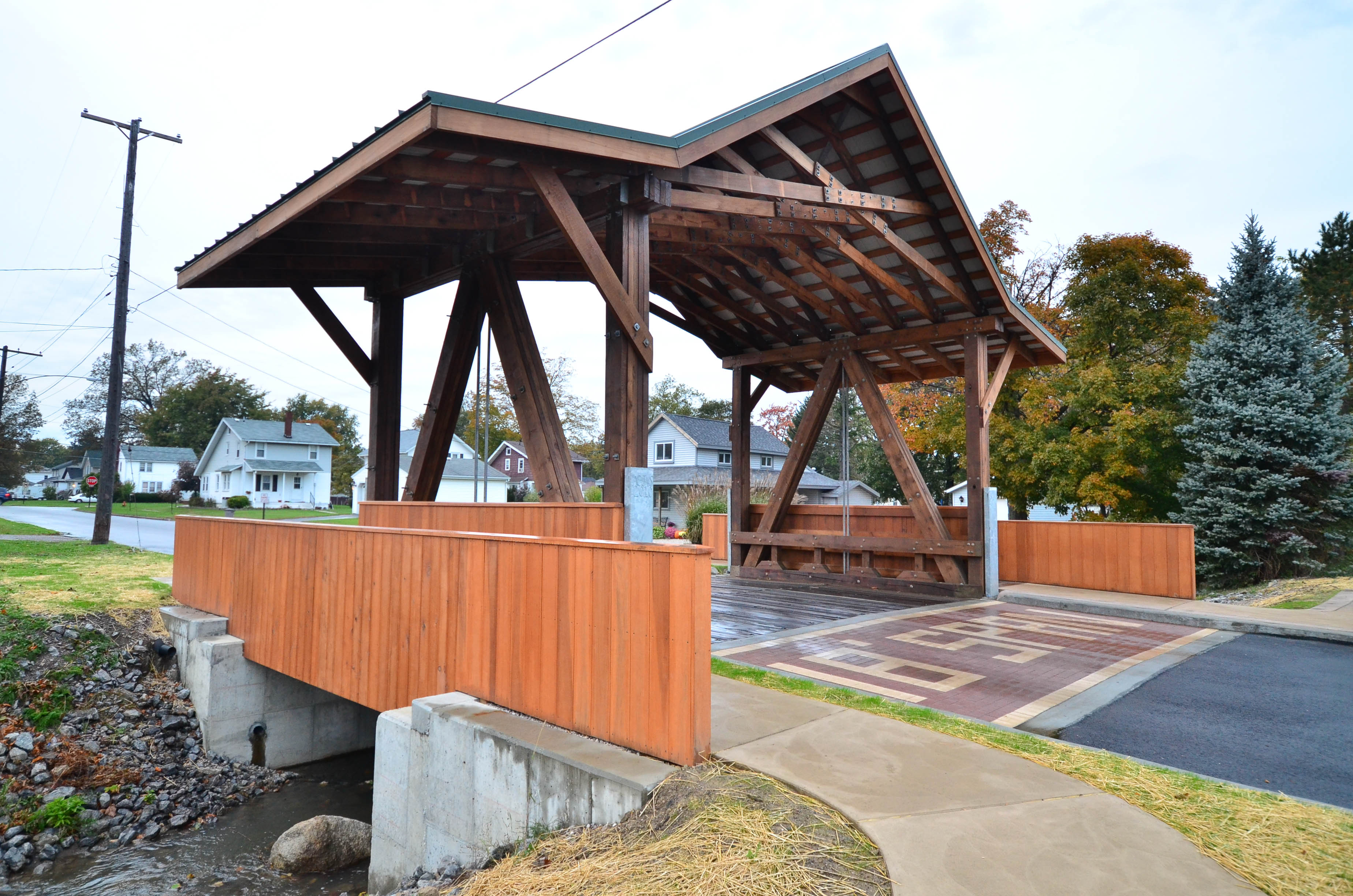
- Coordinates: 41.79915°N 80.9485°W
- Crosses: Cowles Creek
- Locale: Geneva, Ohio
- Maintained by: City of Geneva, Ohio

Characteristics
- Total length: 18 feet (5.5 m)
- No. of spans: 1

History
- Designer: John Smolen
- Construction start: 2010
- Construction end: 2011
- Opened: 2011

Location
- Interactive map of West Liberty Covered Bridge

The West Liberty Covered Bridge is a covered bridge which carries West Liberty Street across Cowles Creek in Geneva, Ohio, United States. At 18 feet (5.5 m), it has been called the shortest covered bridge in the United States. The bridge, one of 17 drivable covered bridges in the county, was designed by John Smolen, former Ashtabula County Engineer and the designer of the Smolen–Gulf Bridge, the longest covered bridge in the U.S., also in Ashtabula County.

== Construction ==
Conceived in 2007, the bridge project proceeded in 2008 when the Ohio Public Works Commission supplied a grant for its construction. The crossing used to be over a concrete culvert. When the culvert needed repairs, it was decided to replace it with a covered bridge, because it would be cheaper (or at least comparable, at $400,000) and also would add to the tourism created by Ashtabula County's other covered bridges.

The foundation for the bridge was laid in September 2010, with the bridge proper assembled starting the following month. About 60 students from the Ashtabula County Joint Vocational School (now Ashtabula County Technical and Career Campus, or A-Tech) in nearby Jefferson Township contributed their labor, further defraying the costs.

The bridge opened to traffic on August 22, 2011. It was dedicated on October 8, 2011. It has footpaths on both sides that are protected from road traffic.

== Gallery ==
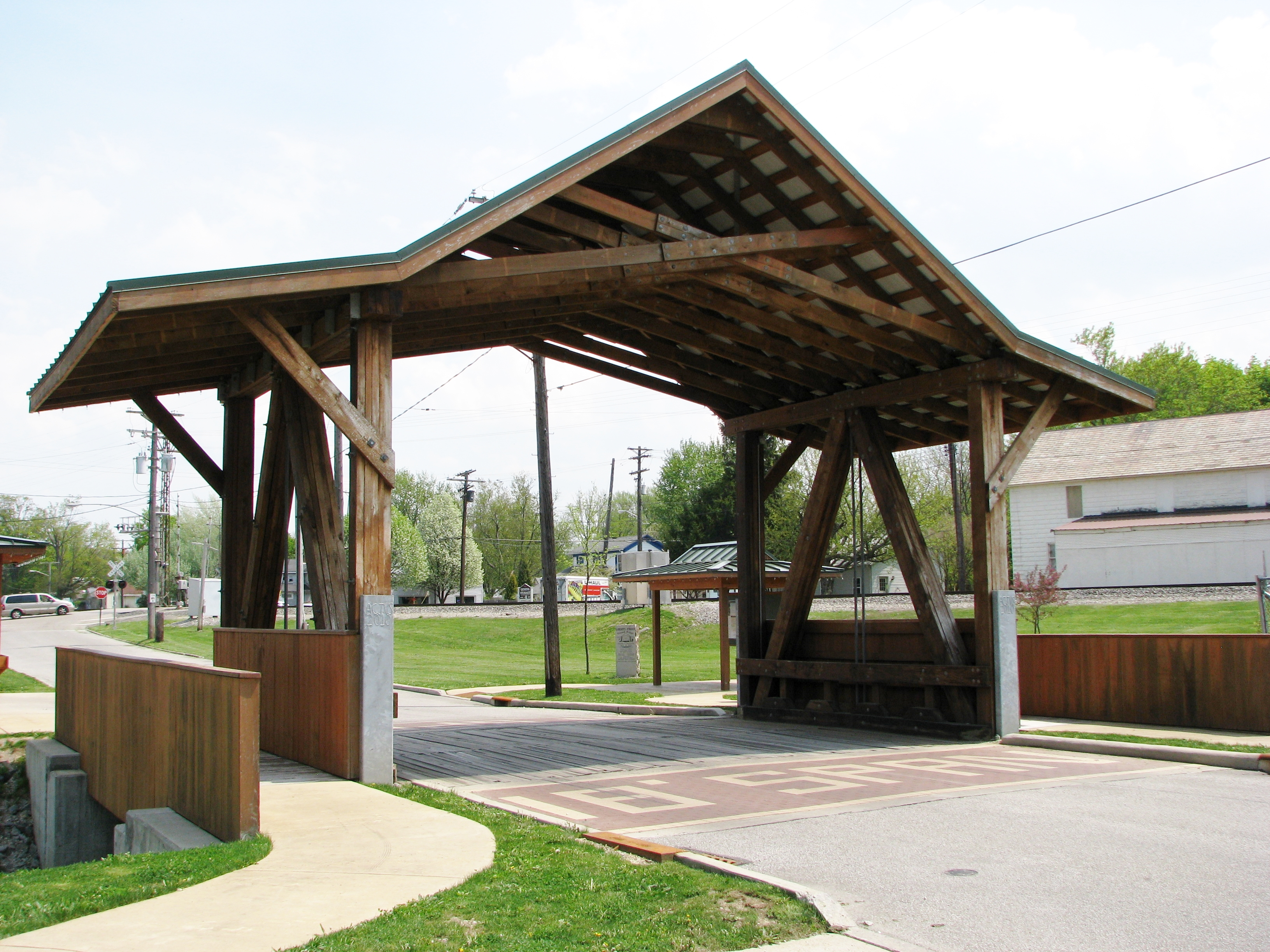

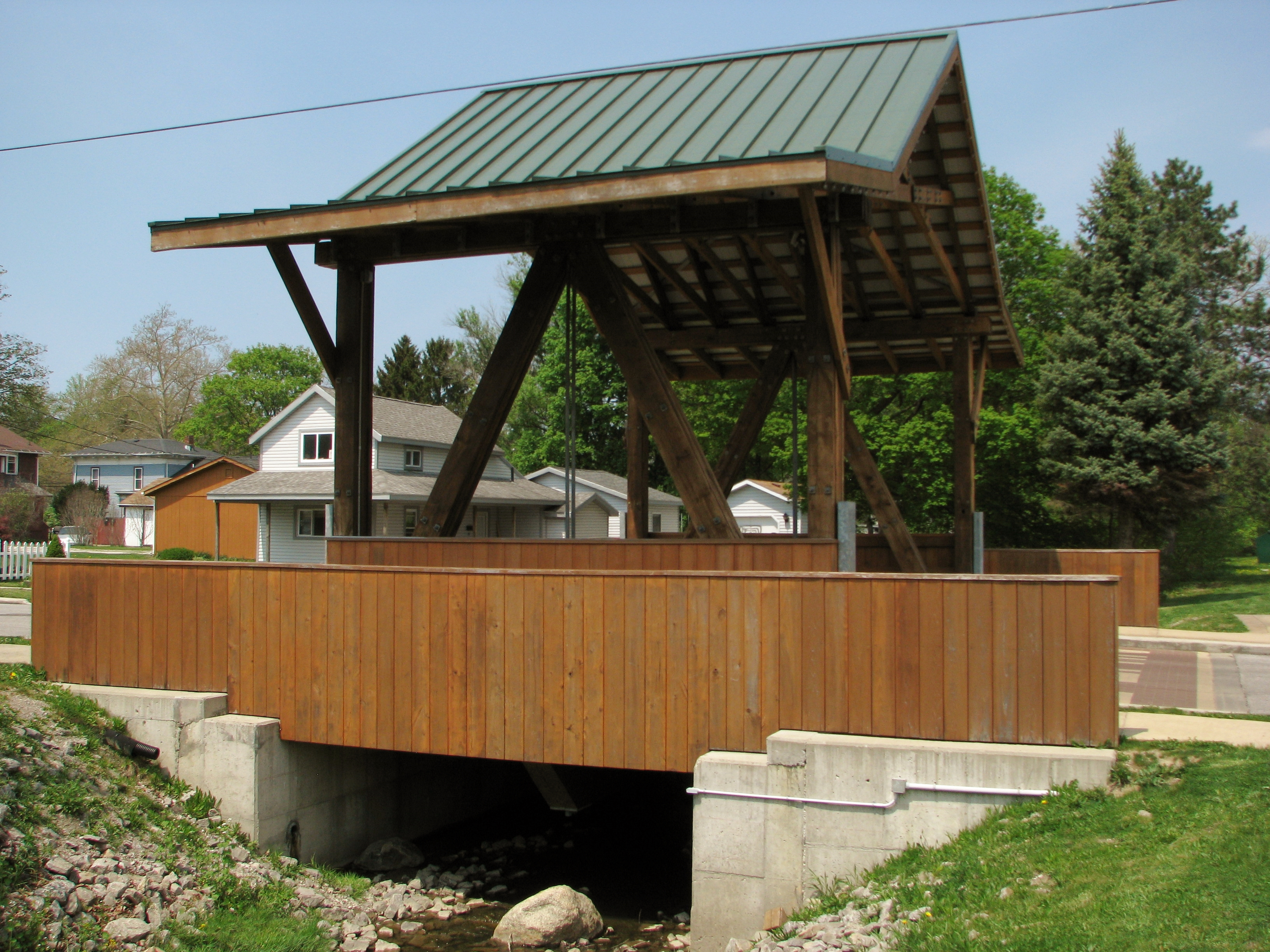

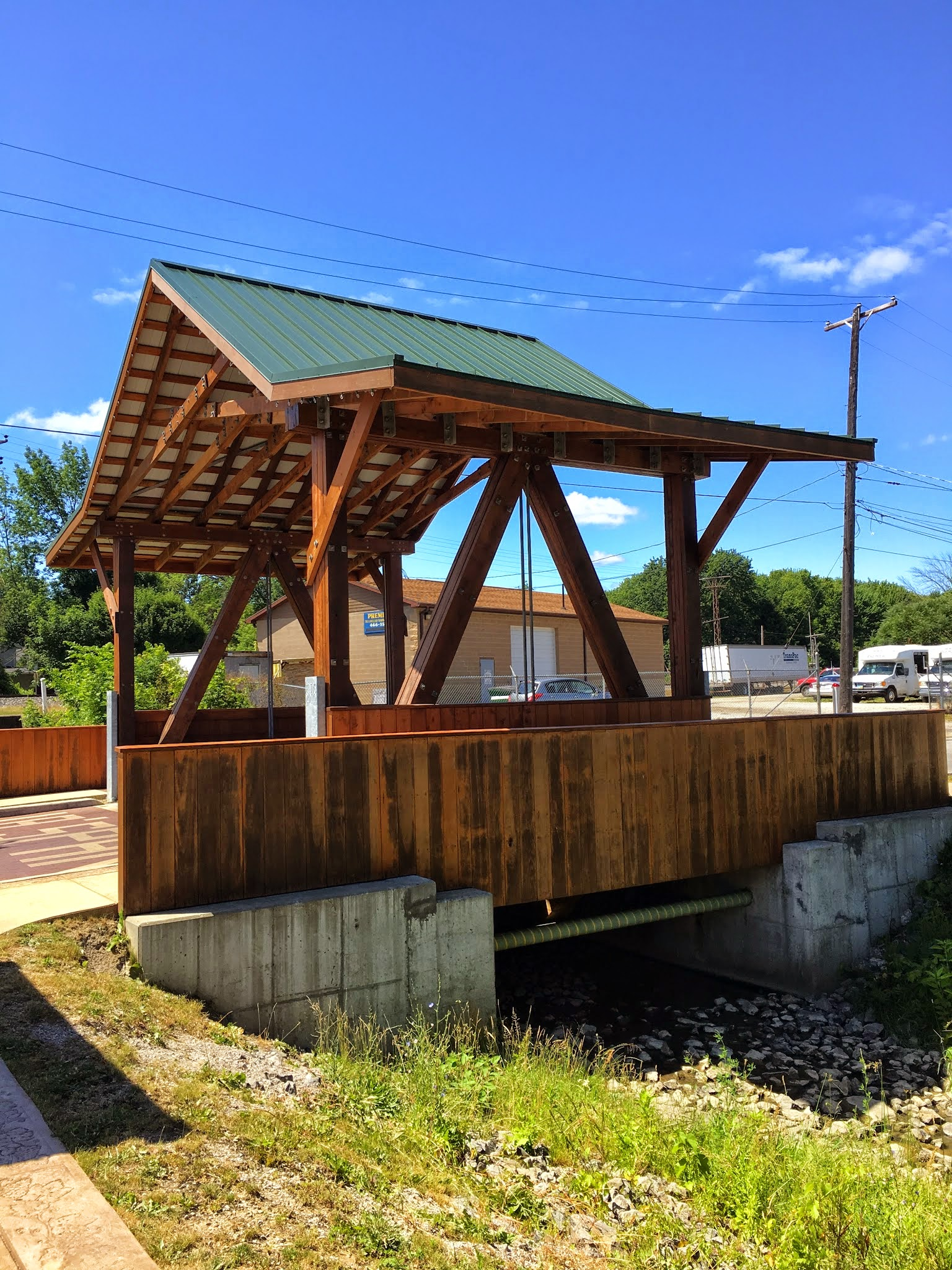

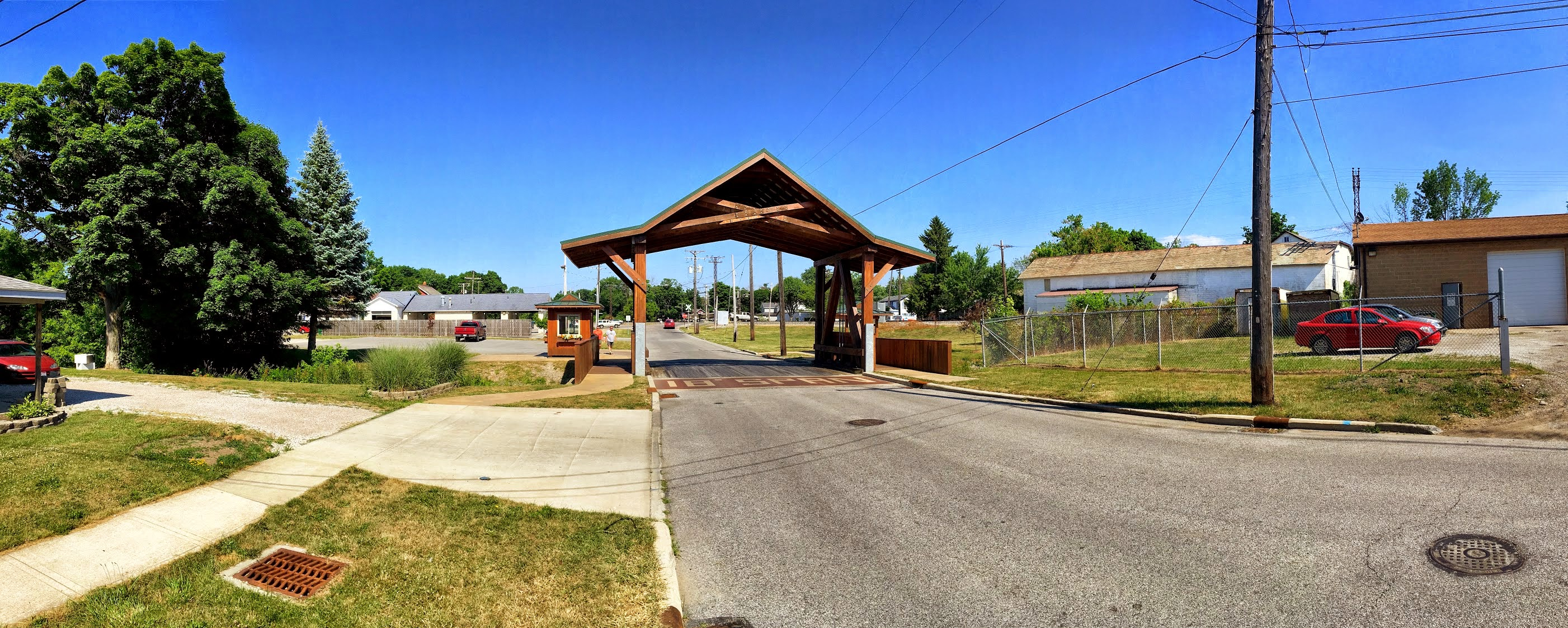

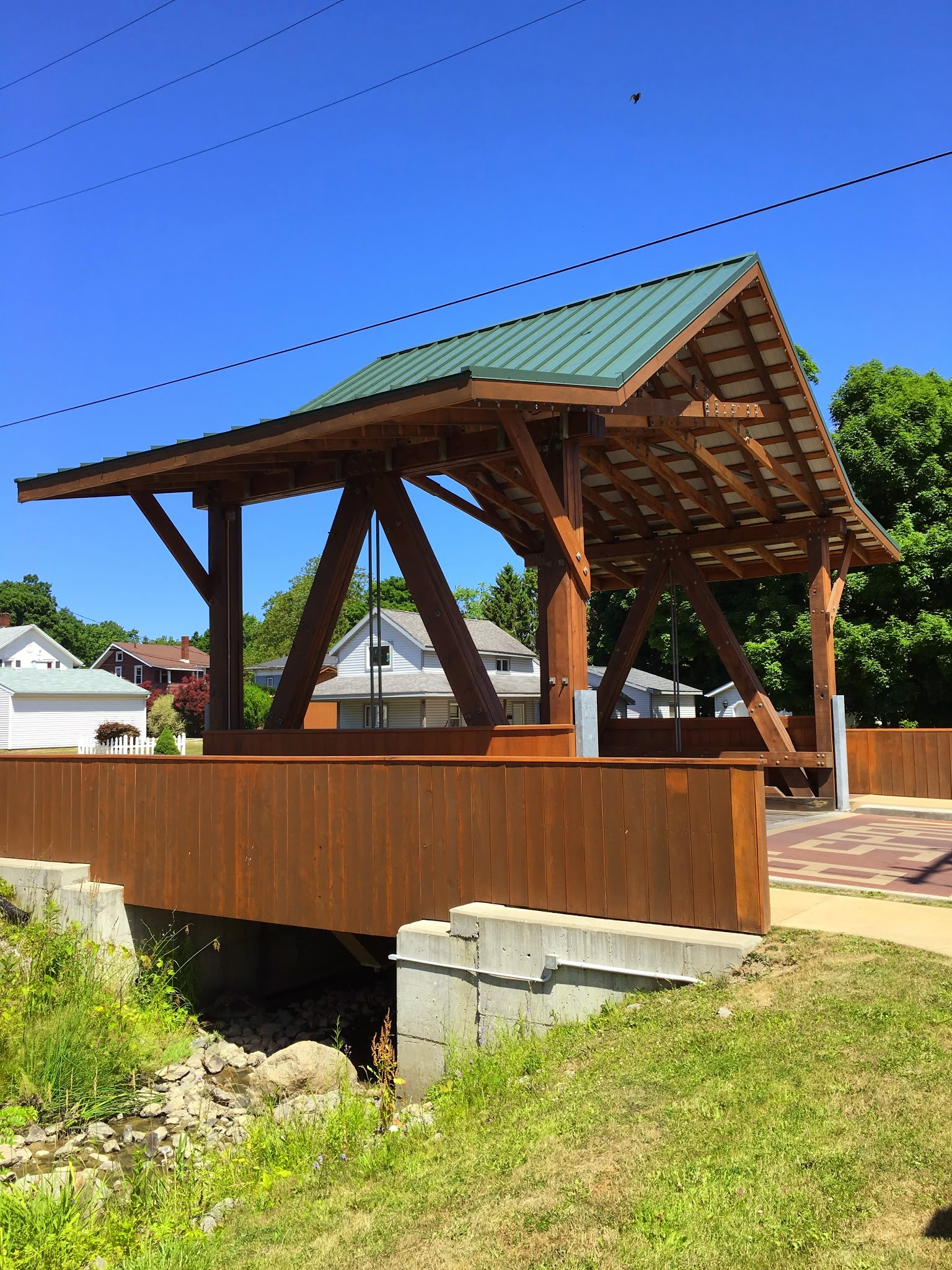

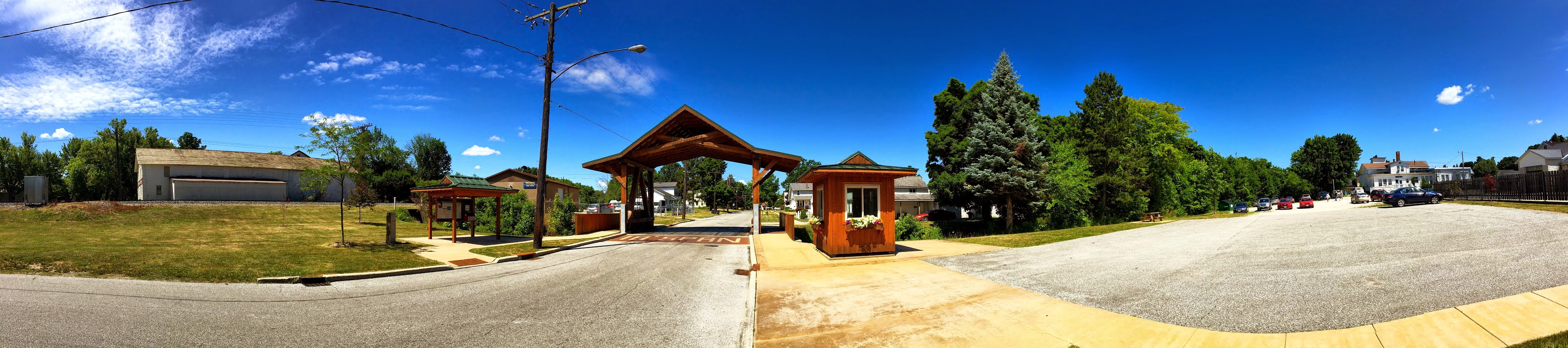

== See also ==
- List of Ashtabula County covered bridges
