= Roley School Covered Bridge =

Covered bridge in Lancaster, Ohio, United States

The Roley School Covered Bridge is a covered bridge now located in Fairfield County's County Fairgrounds in Lancaster, Ohio. It was built in 1899 by J.W. Buchanan. It was moved in 1914 and again in 1974. The bridge collapsed during a storm in 2016 and the remains are currently in storage.
