= Todd Fork =

River in the United States of America

Todd Fork is a stream in Clinton and Warren counties, Ohio, in the United States. It is a tributary of the Little Miami River.

Todd Fork was likely named in the 18th century for the Todd family of pioneer settlers. A variant name is "Todds Fork".

It is spanned by the Martinsville Road Covered Bridge, which is listed on the National Register of Historic Places.

== Location ==
- Mouth: Confluence with the Little Miami River at Morrow 39°21′20″N 84°07′51″W
- Origin: Clinton County east of Wilmington 39°26′49″N 83°43′41″W

== See also ==
- List of rivers of Ohio
