= Bennett Schoolhouse Road Covered Bridge =

- U.S. National Register of Historic Places
- Location within Ohio
- Nearest city: Minford, Ohio
- Coordinates: 38°49′45″N 82°48′26″W
- Area: less than one acre
- Built: 1867
- Built by: Farney, V.B.
- Architectural style: King post truss
- NRHP reference No.: 78002185
- Added to NRHP: October 11, 1978

The Bennett Schoolhouse Road Covered Bridge, near Minford, Ohio, was built in 1867. It was listed on the National Register of Historic Places in 1978.

It is located southeast of Minford.

It was a King post truss bridge and was a work of V.B. Farney. It has also been known as the Tuttleville Bridge and as Bridge No. 35-73-03.

It carried Bennett Schoolhouse Road over the Little Scioto River at Harrison Mills in Harrison Township, Scioto County, Ohio.

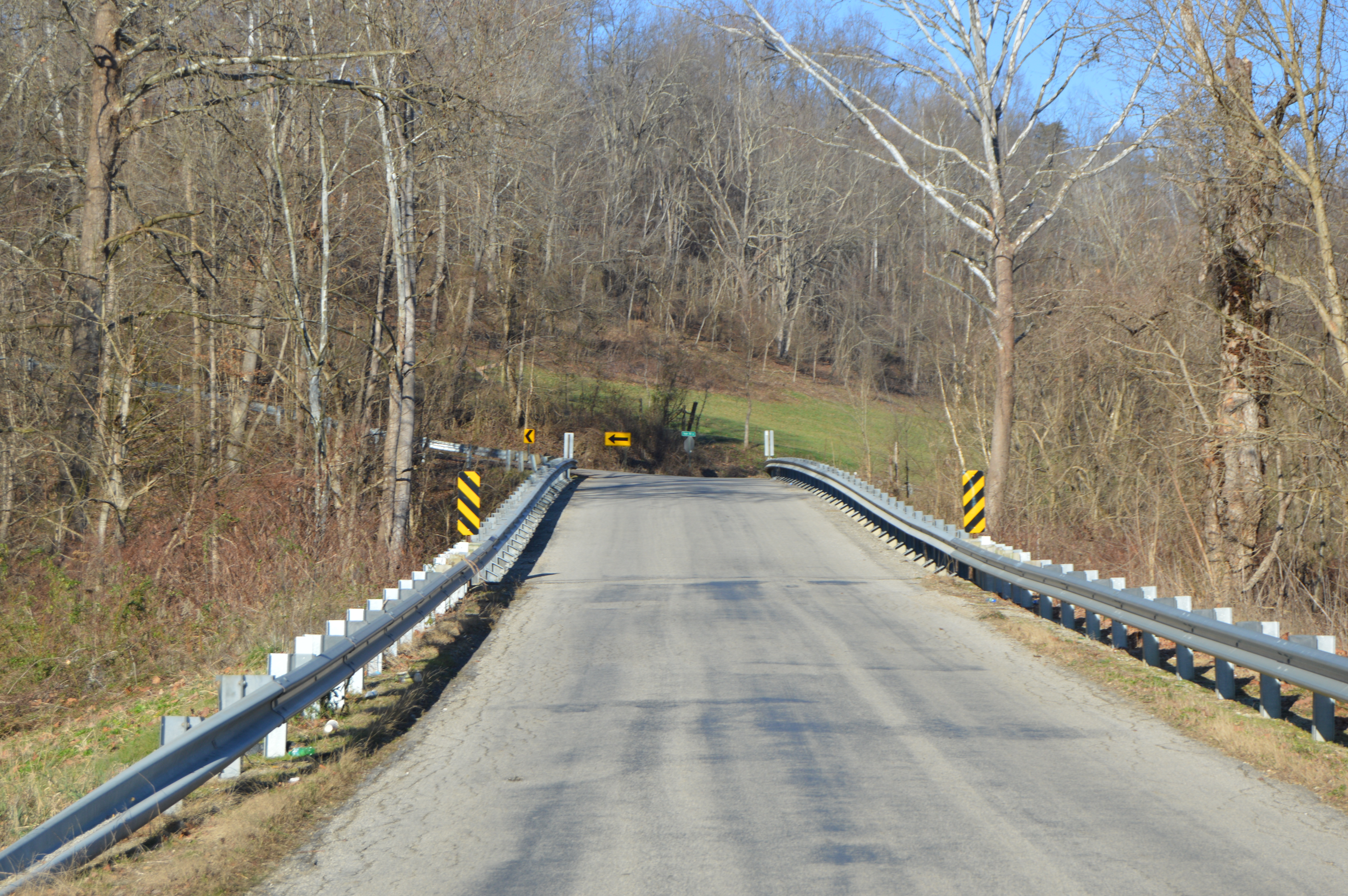
Site in 2016

The historic covered bridge is no longer in place.
