= Old Enon Road Stone Arch Culvert =

- U.S. National Register of Historic Places
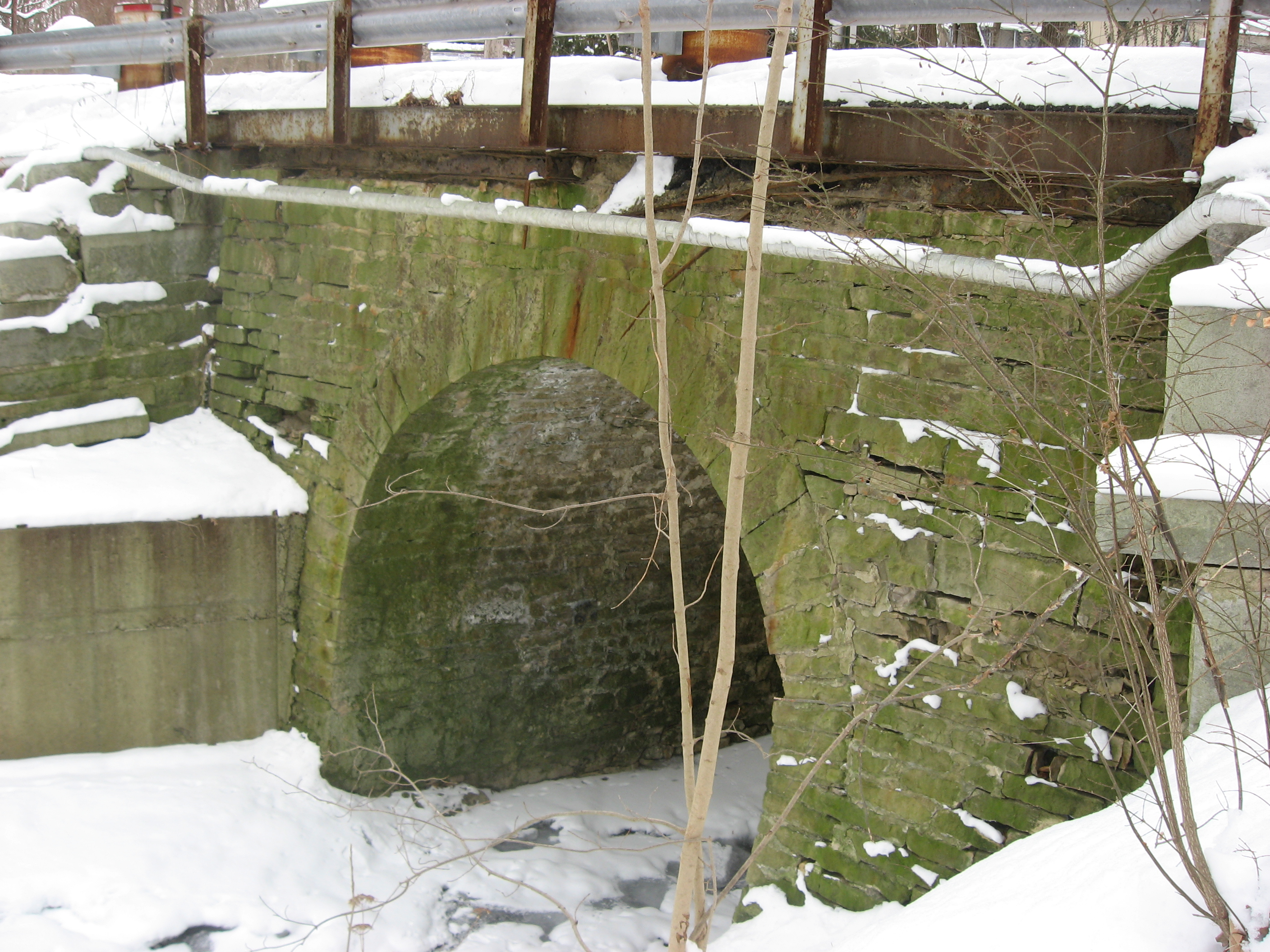
- Northern side of the culvert

- Location within Ohio Location within the United States
- Location: Rocky Point Rd., approximately 185 feet west of Old Mill Rd., Mad River Township, Clark County, Ohio
- Nearest city: Enon
- Coordinates: 39°52′10.4″N 83°52′45.6″W
- Built: 1871
- Architect: Samuel S. Taylor
- NRHP reference No.: 09000209
- Added to NRHP: April 4, 2009

The Old Enon Road Stone Arch Culvert is a historic limestone bridge in southern Clark County, Ohio, United States. It carries Rocky Point Road over Mud Run, a tributary of the Mad River, just west of its intersection with Old Mill Road. Located approximately 3.5 miles (5.6 km) east of Enon in eastern Mad River Township, it was constructed under the leadership of stonemason Samuel Taylor in 1871. In the past, the region was dotten with stone culverts, which were built in the nineteenth and early twentieth centuries to carry roads over small watercourses. Today, few stone culverts survive in Ohio; the Old Enon Road culvert is both Clark County's only such bridge in daily use and the oldest bridge of any type still open to daily traffic throughout the county.

In 2009, the culvert was listed on the National Register of Historic Places. It qualified because of its distinctive engineering, which was seen as representing a significant and well-preserved aspect of local historic architecture.
