= West Orange Road-Thomas Bridge =

- U.S. National Register of Historic Places
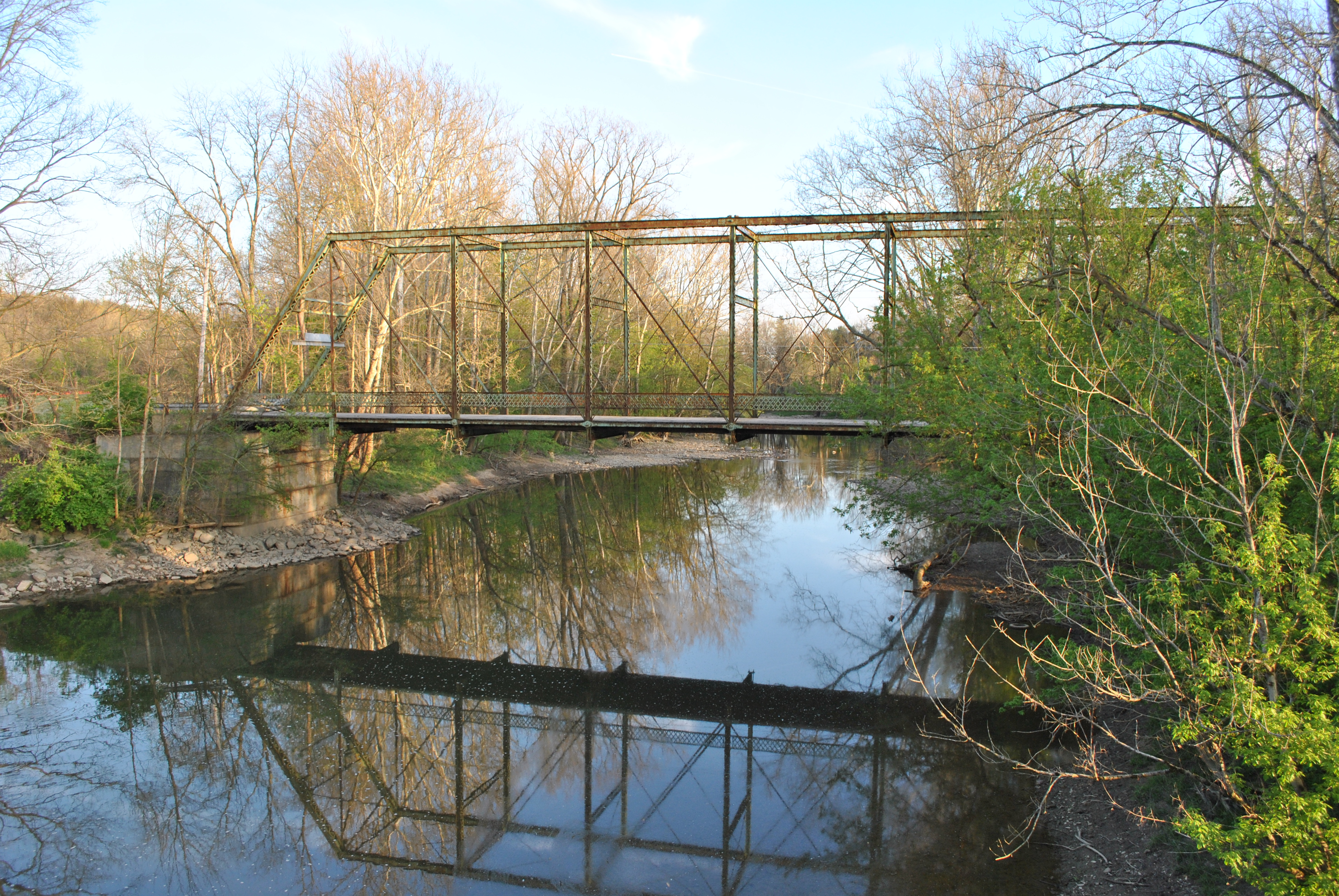

- Location within Ohio Location within the United States
- Location: Township Road 114, East of SR 315,Liberty Township
- Coordinates: 40°10′31″N 83°02′44″W
- Area: 1 acre (0.40 ha)
- Built: 1898
- Architect: Toledo Bridge Company
- Architectural style: Pratt Through Truss
- NRHP reference No.: 02000701
- Added to NRHP: June 26, 2002

The West Orange Road-Thomas Bridge is located off of Township Road 144 near the intersection of West Orange Road in Delaware, Ohio. The bridge was placed on the National Register. Still standing, the bridge was closed to traffic in 2007 and replaced by the DEL-TR 114-0.00 bridge which was constructed in 2009.
