= Middleburg, Noble County, Ohio =

Unincorporated community

Coordinates: 39°40′28″N 81°23′22″W

Middleburg is an unincorporated community in Noble County, in the U.S. state of Ohio.

== History ==
Middleburg was laid out in 1844. An old variant name of Middleburg was Middle Creek. A post office was established in the community as Middle Creek in 1837, and remained in operation until 1905.
