= Ohio University Lancaster historic bridges =

The historic bridges at the Lancaster campus of Ohio University were moved to the campus and sit about 100 yards (91 m) apart. The bridges were built in 1881 and 1884–85 very close to each other, both crossing Poplar Creek, and while the first-built is a wood-and-steel covered bridge and the second-built is all-steel, they are similar in design. Original and current locations of both bridges may be seen in OpenStreetMap linked at right.

== Bridge No. 2 ==
- John Bright Covered Bridge
- U.S. National Register of Historic Places
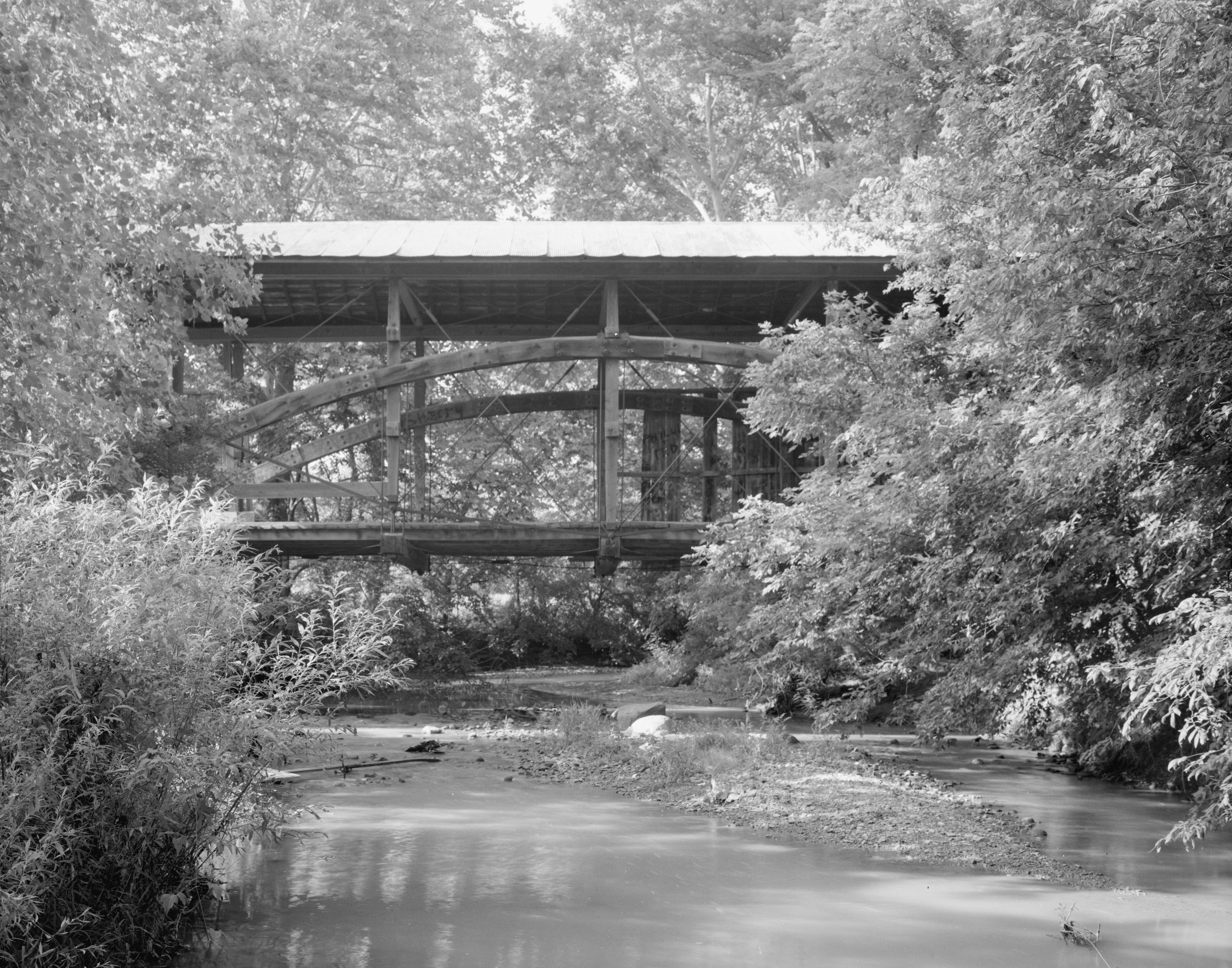
- Nearest city: Baltimore, Ohio
- Area: less than one acre
- Built: 1881
- Built by: Aug Borneman and Sons
- Architectural style: One-span combination truss
- NRHP reference No.: 75001393
- Added to NRHP: May 28, 1975

The John Bright Covered Bridge, also known as John Bright Bridge No. 2, near Baltimore, Ohio, was built in 1881 by Aug Borneman and Sons to span Poplar Creek 2.5 miles (4.0 km) southwest of Baltimore. It was moved and now spans Fetters Run on the campus of Ohio University's Lancaster campus. It was listed on the National Register of Historic Places in 1975.

The bridge was moved from its original location, 39°49′50″N 82°40′23″W, 2 miles (3.2 km) northeast of Carroll on Bish Road NW, to its current location 39.737595°N 82.584731°W spanning Fetters Run.

It is a single-span wood and steel combination truss bridge.

The bridge was documented by the Historic American Engineering Record as John Bright No. 2 Covered Bridge in 1986.

== Bridge No. 1 ==
- John Bright No. 1 Iron Bridge
- U.S. National Register of Historic Places
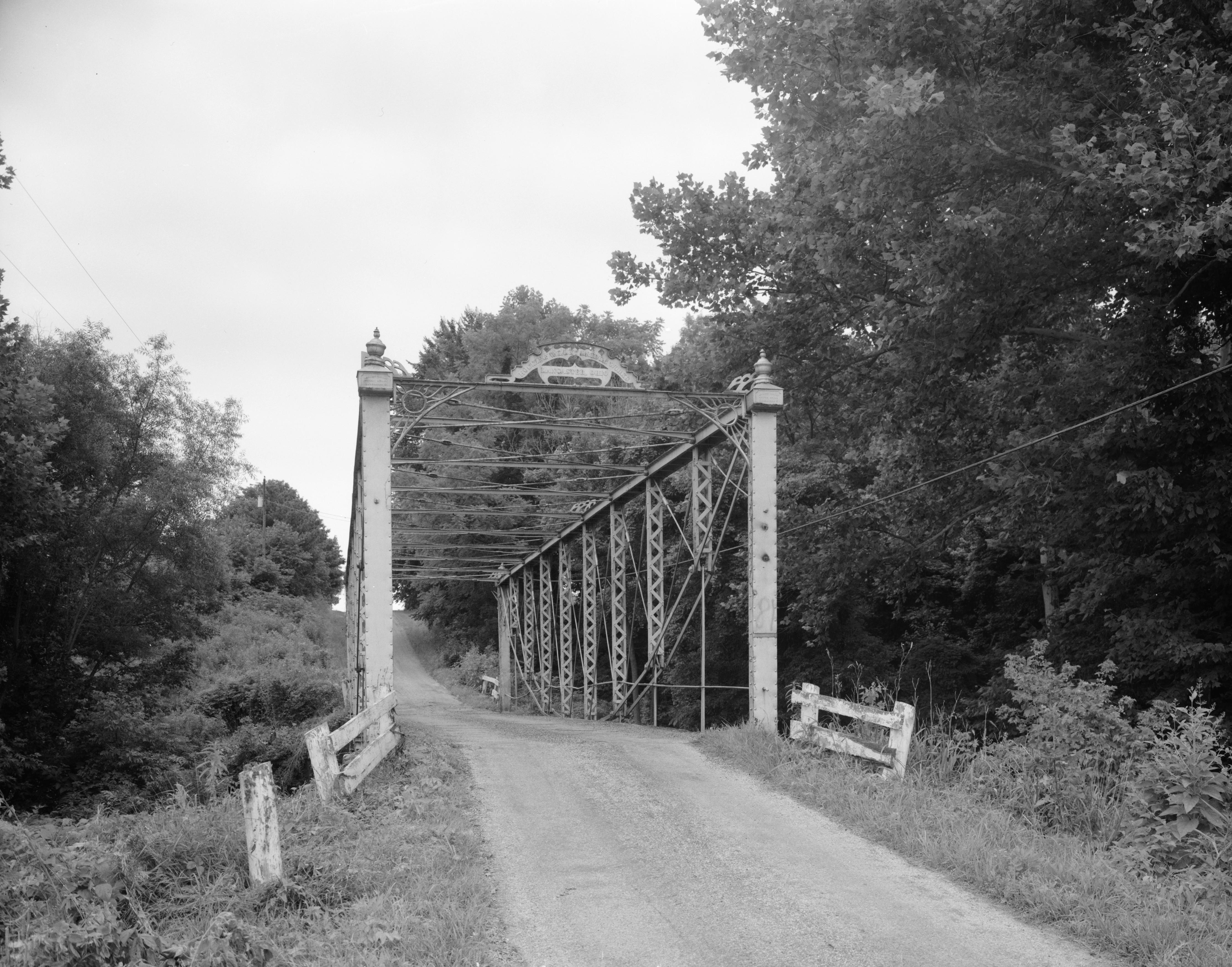
- Nearest city: Carroll, Ohio
- Area: less than one acre
- Built: c. 1884–85
- Built by: Hocking Valley Bridge Works
- Architectural style: One-span steel eye-bar
- NRHP reference No.: 78002060
- Added to NRHP: September 20, 1978

The John Bright No. 1 Iron Bridge, near Carroll, Ohio, was listed on the National Register of Historic Places in 1978. It was built by the Hocking Valley Bridge Works and is a single-span steel eye-bar bridge.

According to the Historic American Engineering Record:

The John Bright No. 1 Iron Bridge was built by the Hocking Valley Bridge Works (HVBW) of Lancaster, Ohio, probably in 1884-5. It is one of a relatively small number of surviving bridges to have been built by this local firm. The suspension truss design is very unusual, and is only known to have been used in a few bridges in Ohio by three bridge builders. There are some similarities in this bridge to several patented designs, but it most closely resembles Archibald McGuffie's 1861 patent for 'Improvement in Construction of Bridges.' The bridge is very similar in design to the nearby John Bright No. 2 Covered Bridge (see HAER No. OH-45).

The bridge was built to span Poplar Creek, carrying Havensport Road NW over Poplar Creek, about 2 miles (3.2 km) northeast of Carroll, at 39.829487°N 82.674188°W. It now spans Fetters Run, at 39.736492°N 82.584689°W. It was moved to its current position 100 feet (30 m) downstream of John Bright Bridge No. 2, on Fetter's Creek, in 1986.

== Photos ==
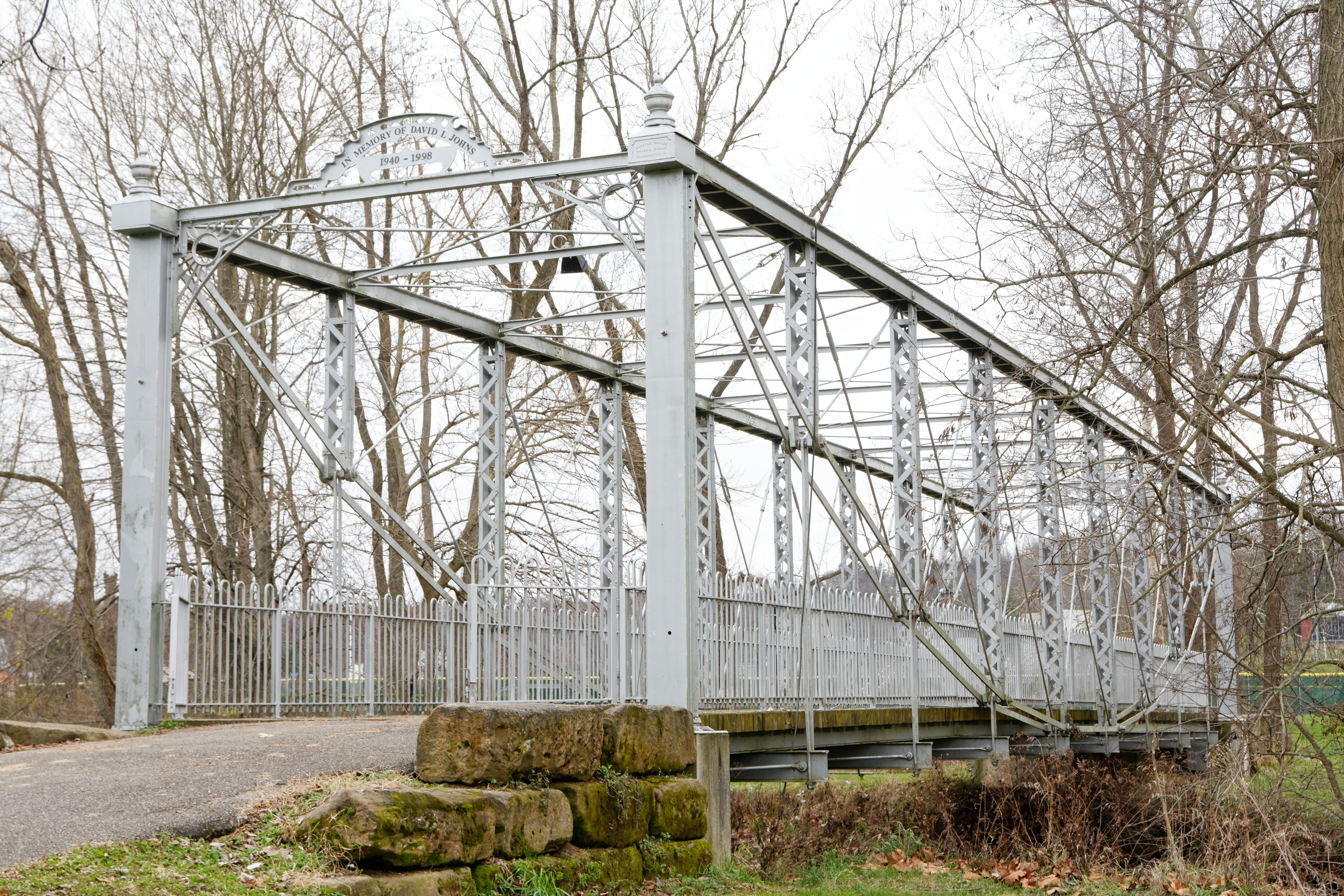
Bridge No. 1 in its 2017 location

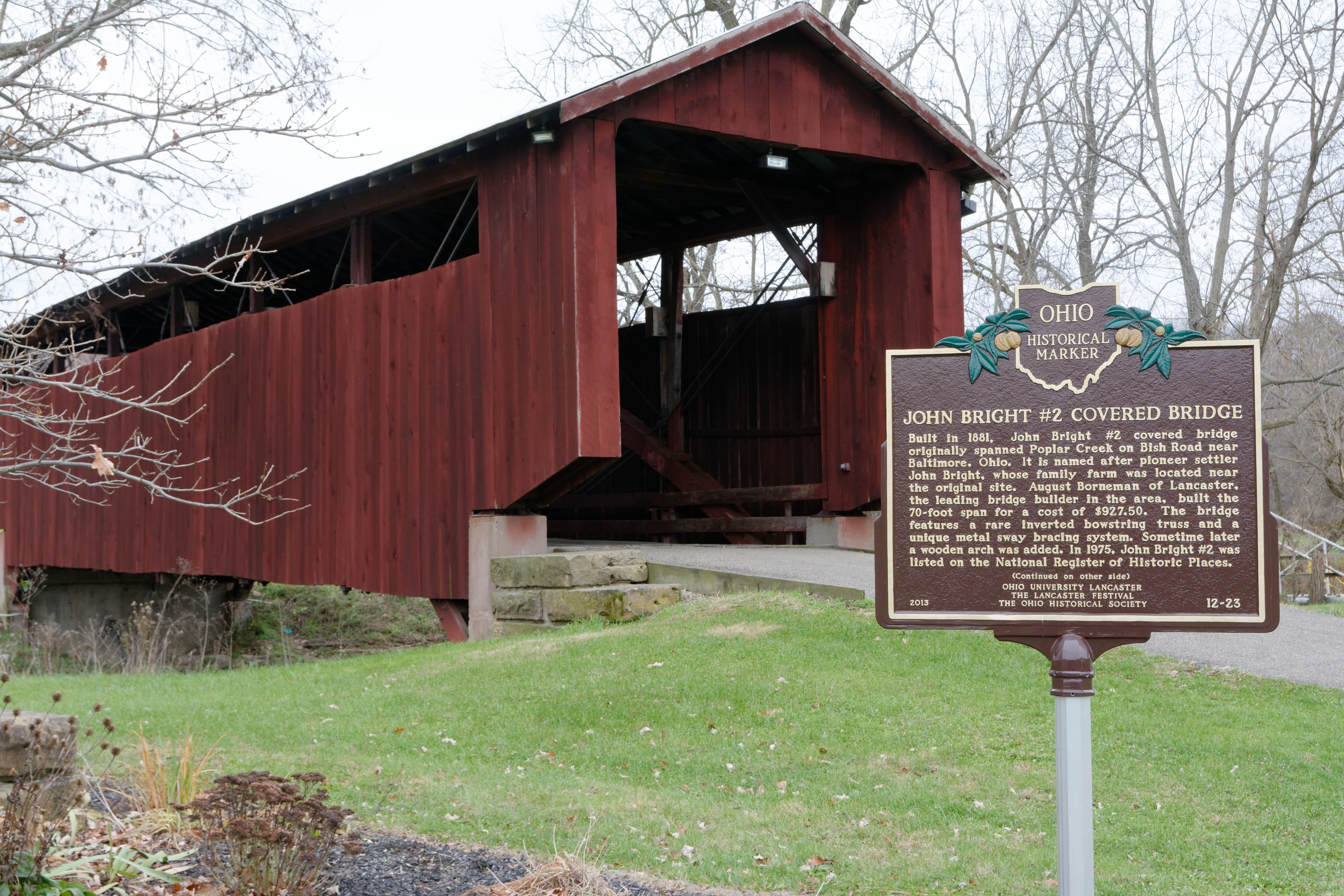
Bridge No. 2 in its 2017 location

== See also ==
- List of bridges documented by the Historic American Engineering Record in Ohio
