= Rock Mill Covered Bridge =

- U.S. National Register of Historic Places
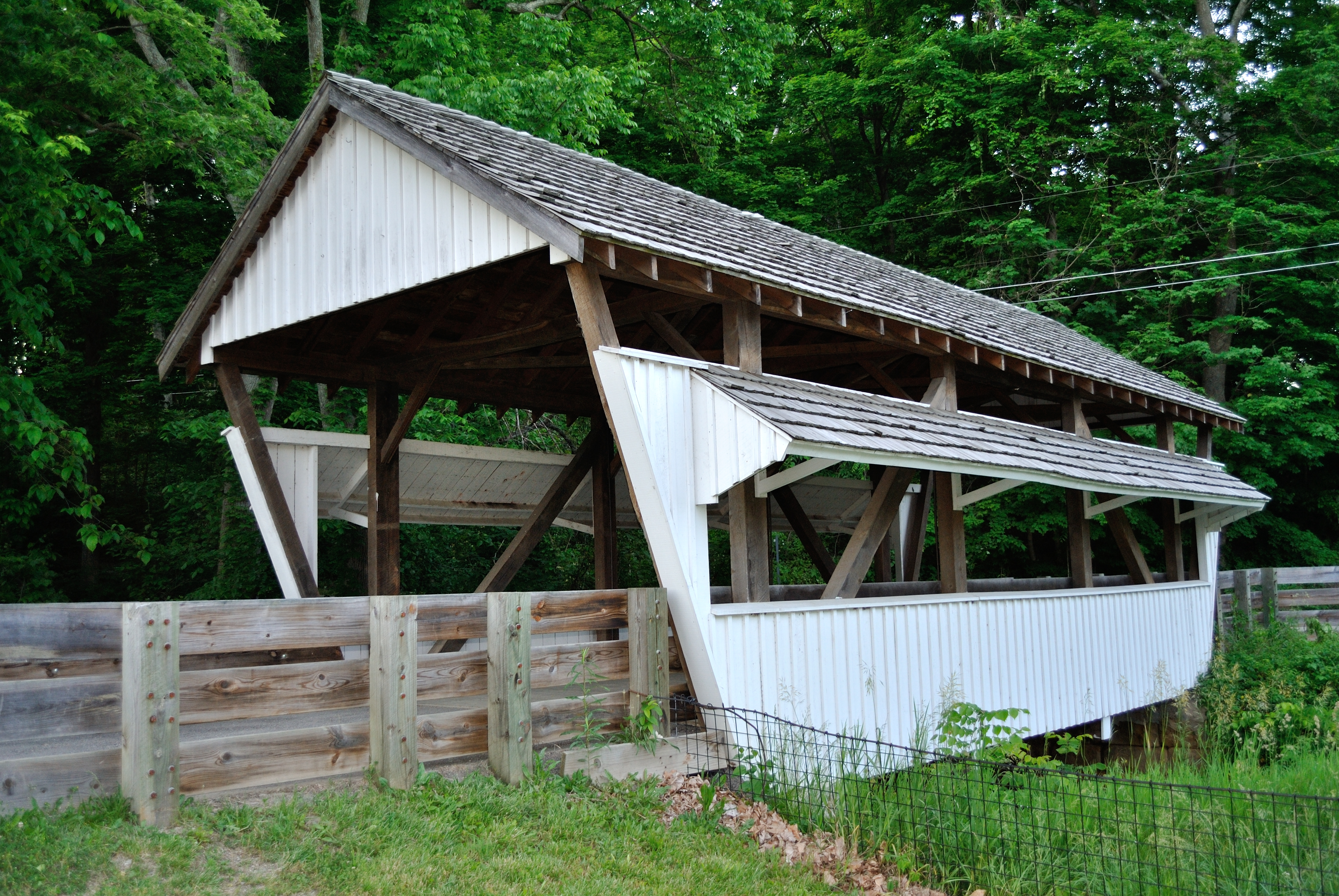

- Location within Ohio
- Coordinates: 39°44′56″N 82°42′48″W
- Area: less than one acre
- Built: 1901
- Built by: Brandt, Jacob R.
- Architectural style: Queen Post Truss
- NRHP reference No.: 76001424
- Added to NRHP: April 26, 1976

The Rock Mill Covered Bridge, on Rock Mill Place in Bloom Township, Fairfield County, Ohio, is a Queen Post truss bridge. It was listed on the National Register of Historic Places in 1976.

It is a single-span wooden covered bridge spanning a deep gorge of the Hocking River.
