= Martinsville Road Covered Bridge =

- U.S. National Register of Historic Places
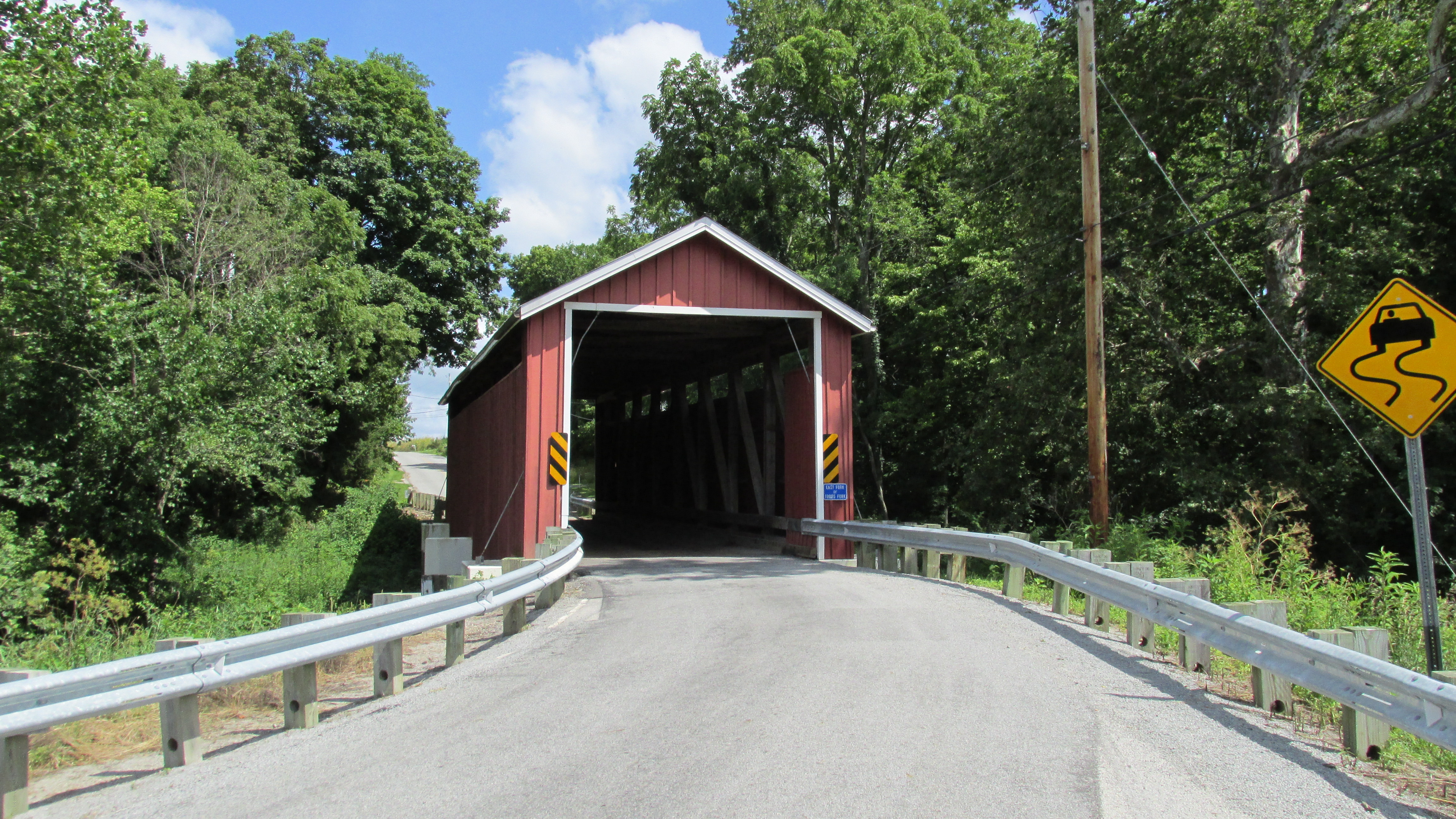
- Bridge in 2013

- Location within Ohio
- Nearest city: Martinsville, Ohio
- Coordinates: 39°19′47″N 83°50′06″W
- Area: less than one acre
- Built: 1871
- Built by: Wall, Zimri
- Architectural style: Multiple kingpost
- NRHP reference No.: 74001421
- Added to NRHP: September 10, 1974

The Martinsville Road Covered Bridge, west of Martinsville, Ohio in Clark Township, Clinton County, Ohio, was built in 1871. It was listed on the National Register of Historic Places in 1974.

It is a multiple kingpost covered bridge.

It spans the East Fork of Todds Fork of the Little Miami River and is 72 feet (22 m) long.

It was built by Zimri Wall in 1871. Wall co-founded the Champion Bridge Company the next year, which in 1999 was one of the oldest continuously operating bridge companies in the U.S., and which considers this bridge its first work.
