= Parker Covered Bridge =

- U.S. National Register of Historic Places
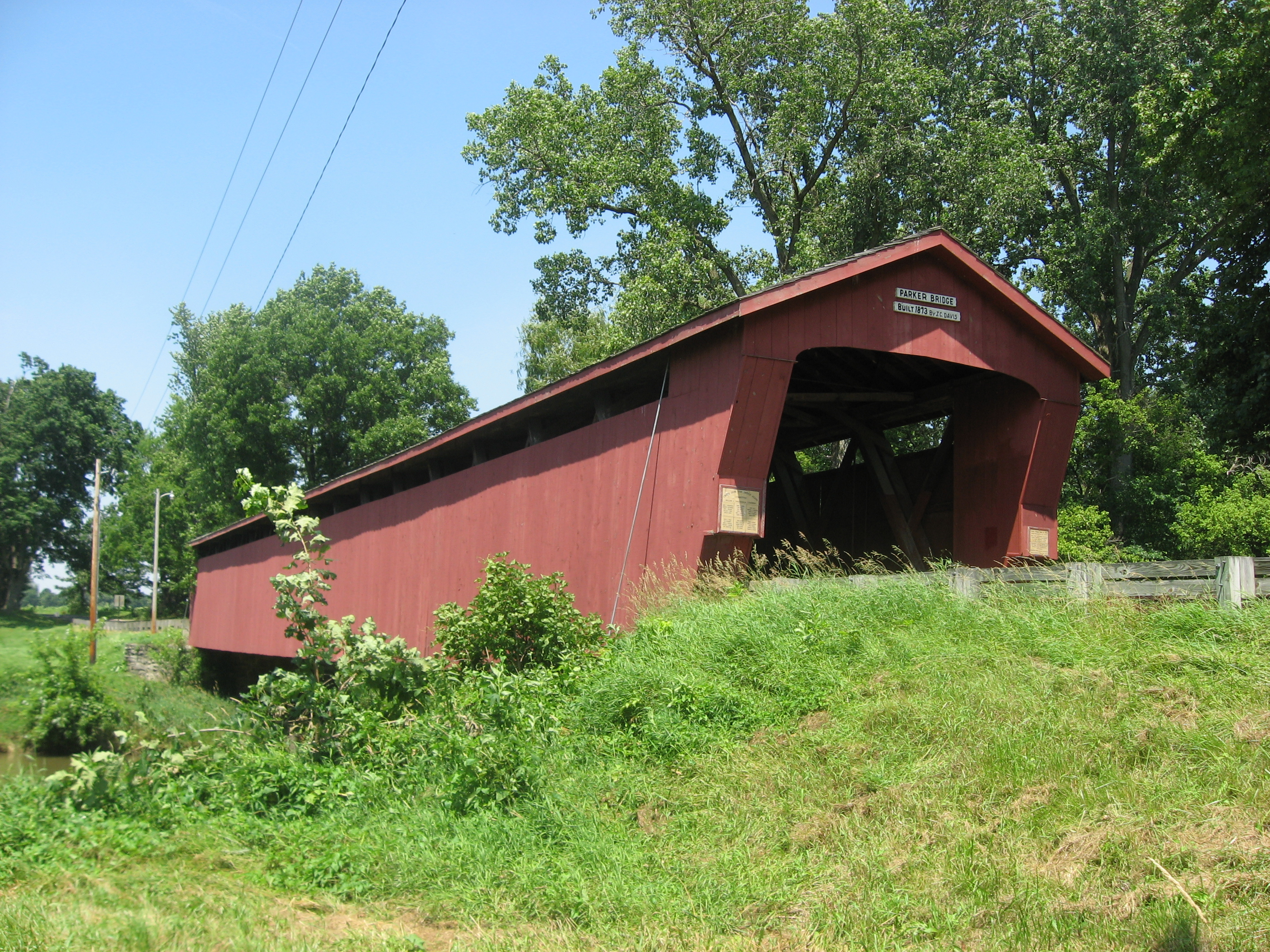

- Location within Ohio
- Nearest city: Upper Sandusky, Ohio
- Coordinates: 40°54′11″N 83°14′41″W
- Area: less than one acre
- Built: 1873
- Built by: J.C. Davis
- Architectural style: Howe Truss
- NRHP reference No.: 75001558
- Added to NRHP: March 31, 1975

The Parker Covered Bridge, near Upper Sandusky, Ohio, was built in 1873 and was listed on the National Register of Historic Places in 1975.

It is located in Crane Township, Wyandot County, Ohio, about 5 miles (8.0 km) northeast of Upper Sandusky on Township Road 40A.

It is a Howe truss covered bridge built by J.C. Davis.

The bridge was burned on May 17, 1991 and was restored in 1993. It is 171.9 feet (52.4 m) in total length with span 162.1 feet (49.4 m) long.

It is covered in the Ohio Historic Places Dictionary.
