= Pugh's Mill Covered Bridge =

- U.S. National Register of Historic Places
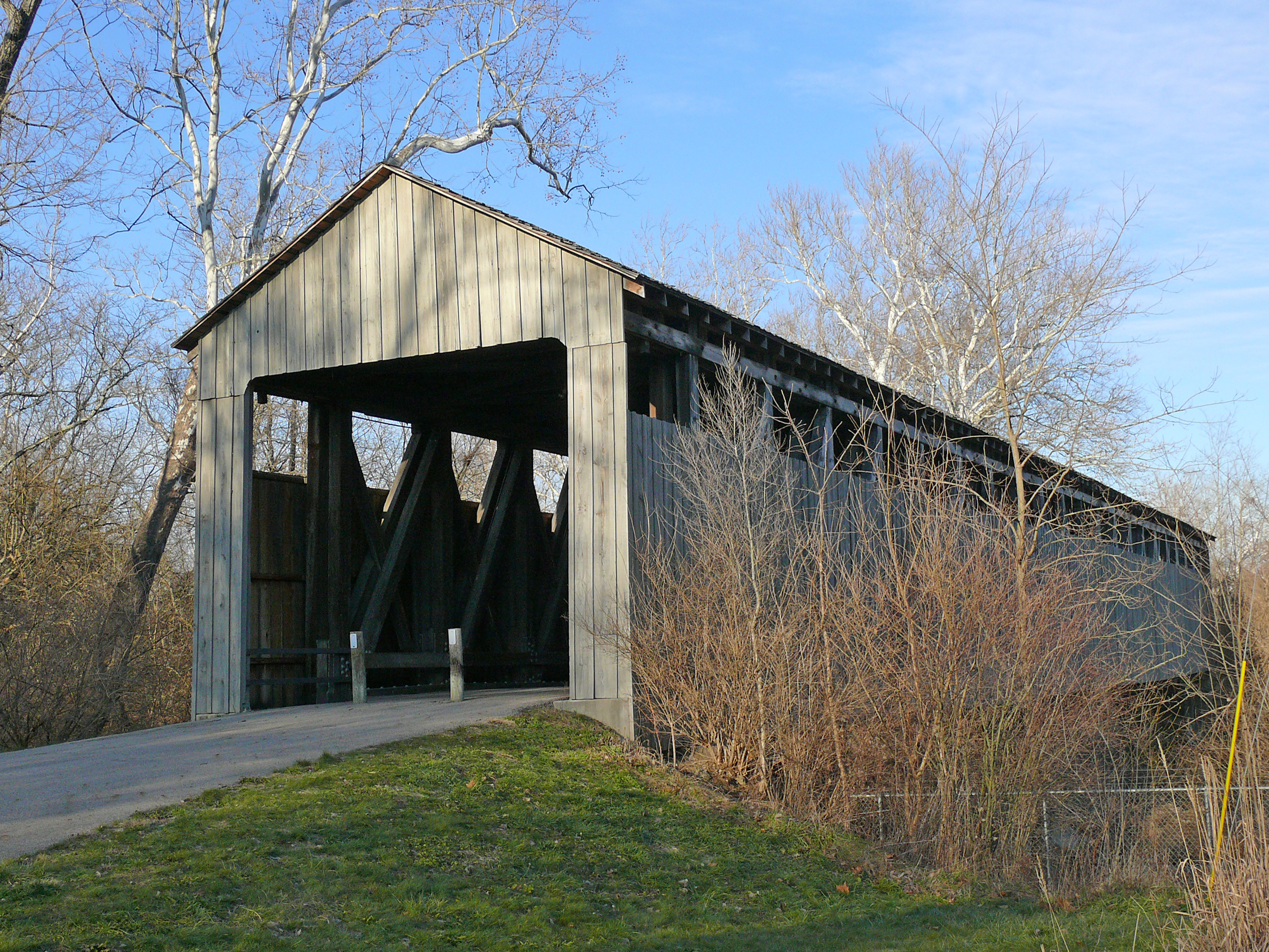
- Nearest city: Oxford, Ohio
- Coordinates: 39°31′27″N 84°44′05″W
- NRHP reference No.: 75001336
- Added to NRHP: 1975-06-05

Pugh's Mill Covered Bridge is a registered historic structure near Oxford, Ohio, listed in the National Register on 1975-06-05. This wooden bridge was built in 1869 over Four Mile (Talawanda) Creek and is one of two remaining covered bridges in Butler County, Ohio. The other is the Bebb Park or State Line covered bridge built in 1868.
