= Newton Falls Covered Bridge =

- U.S. National Register of Historic Places
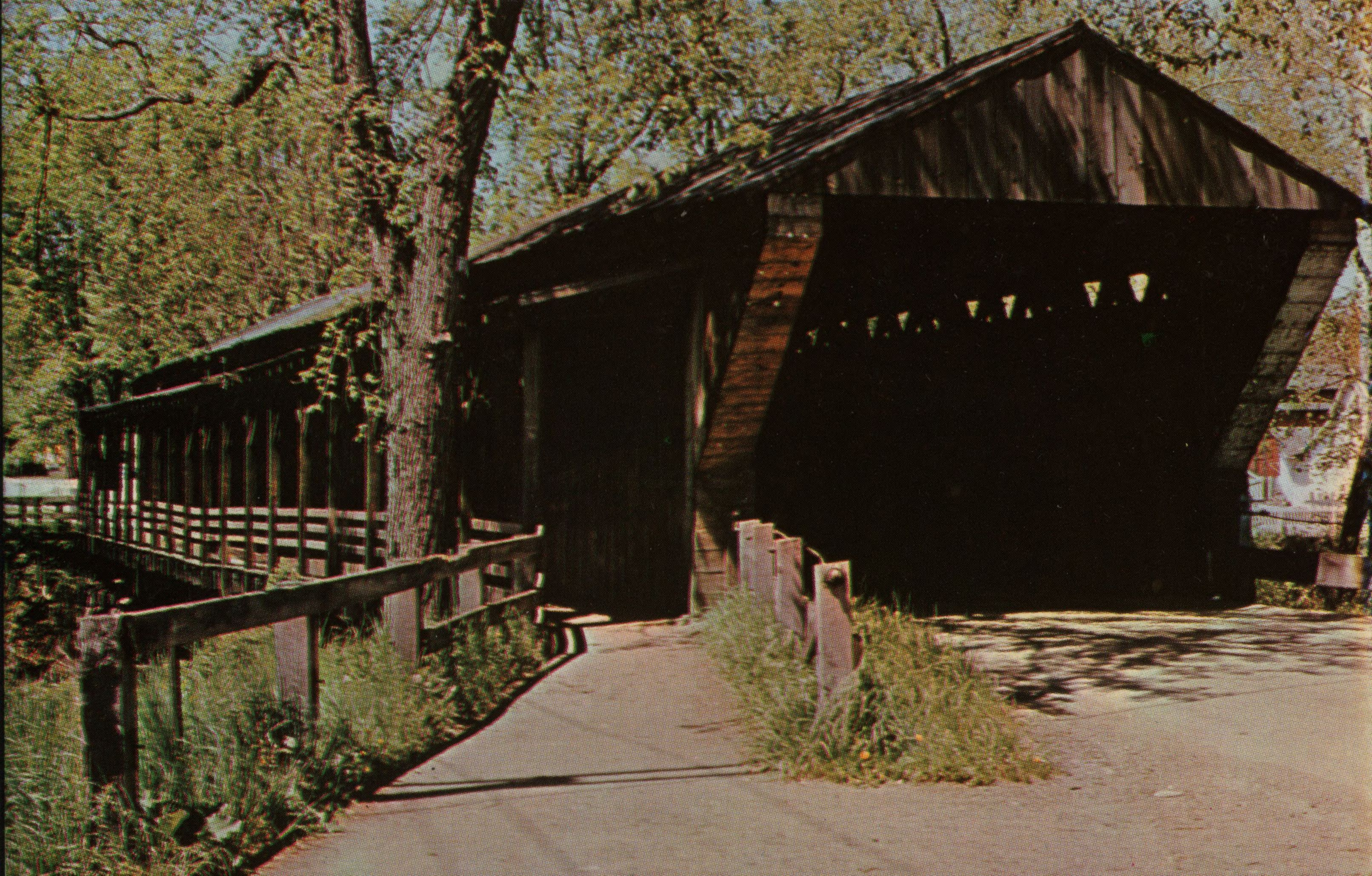

- Location within Ohio
- Location: OH 534, Newton Falls, Ohio
- Coordinates: 41°11′17″N 80°58′17″W
- Area: less than one acre
- Built: c.1831
- Architectural style: Town latice truss
- NRHP reference No.: 74001636
- Added to NRHP: October 16, 1974

The Newton Falls Covered Bridge, in Newton Falls, Ohio, was built around 1831. It was listed on the National Register of Historic Places in 1974. It is also known as the Arlington Boulevard Covered Bridge.

It spans the east branch of the Mahoning River. It is a three-span truss bridge and has vertical siding.

It is unusual for its pedestrian walkway, which was added in 1921 for children on their way to the school on Center Street. "The Newton Falls bridge is considered the second-oldest existing covered bridge in Ohio, the oldest covered bridge in use on its original site, the only covered bridge in the state with a covered crosswalk, and the last surviving covered bridge in Trumbull County. Built on the Town Lattice truss plan, the bridge is 123 feet long and twenty-four feet wide. It has a clear span of 101 1/2 feet and a sixteen foot-wide roadway. Listed on the National Register of Historic Places in 1974, the structure is maintained by Trumbull County."

It includes a Town lattice truss.

It is located off State Route 534.

The Roberts Covered Bridge, also in Ohio, built in 1829, is older, but has been moved from its original location.
