= Blackwood Covered Bridge =

Historic place in Ohio, United States

- U.S. National Register of Historic Places
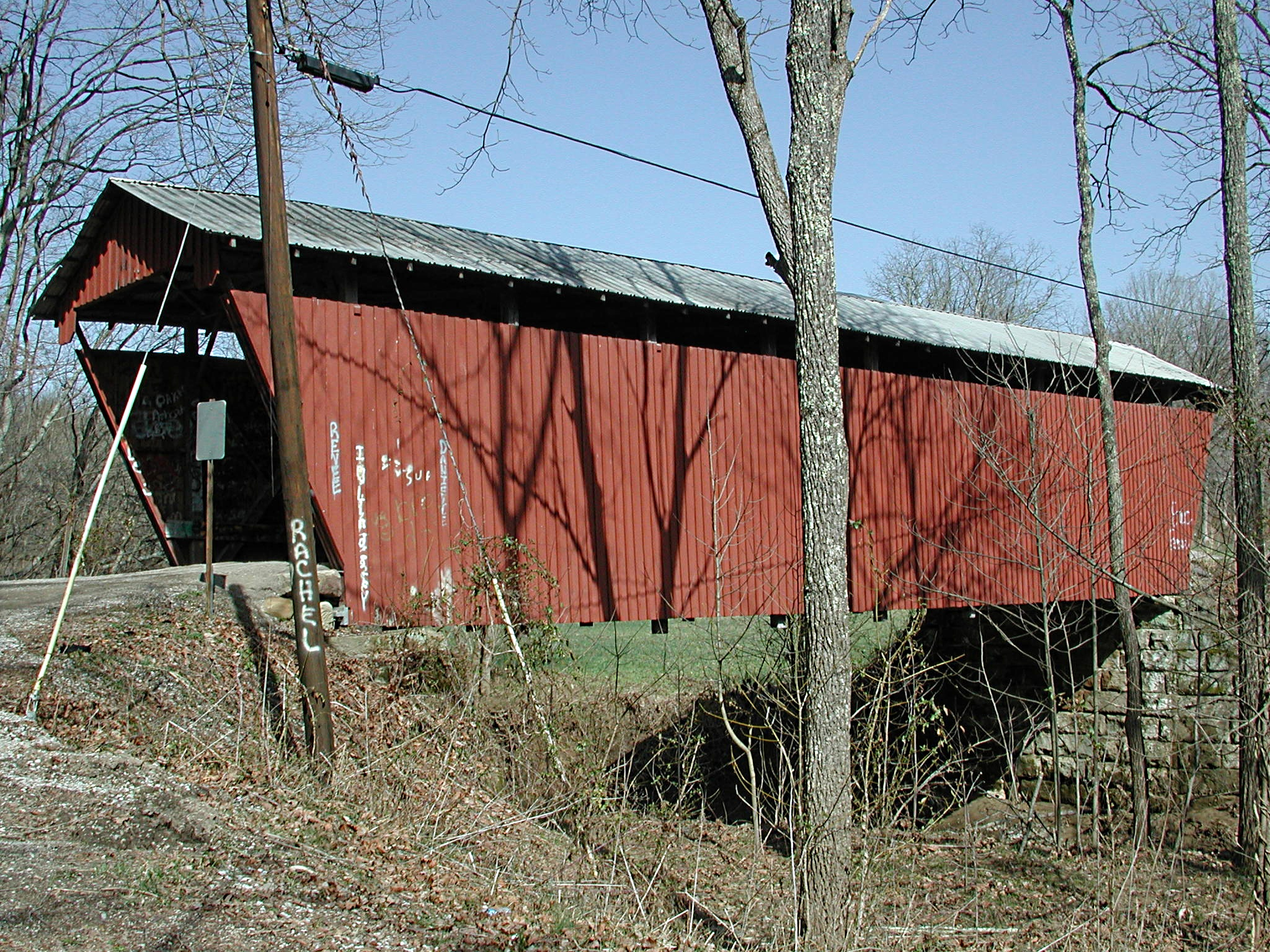

- Location within Ohio
- Nearest city: Athens, Ohio
- Coordinates: 39°11′50″N 81°58′29″W
- Area: less than one acre
- Built: 1881
- Architectural style: King post truss, covered
- NRHP reference No.: 78002004
- Added to NRHP: June 23, 1978

The Blackwood Covered Bridge, over the Shade River near Athens, Ohio, was built in 1881. It is a King post truss bridge. It was listed on the National Register of Historic Places in 1978.

It is located about 10 miles (16 km) southeast of Athens on Blackwood Road (County Road 46) in southern Lodi Township.

It is a single-span bridge with "vertical, high-boarded siding, a metal roof, projected portals, and cut-stone abutments." It is named for the Blackwood family which owned much of Lodi township.
