= Barkhurst Mill Covered Bridge =

- U.S. National Register of Historic Places
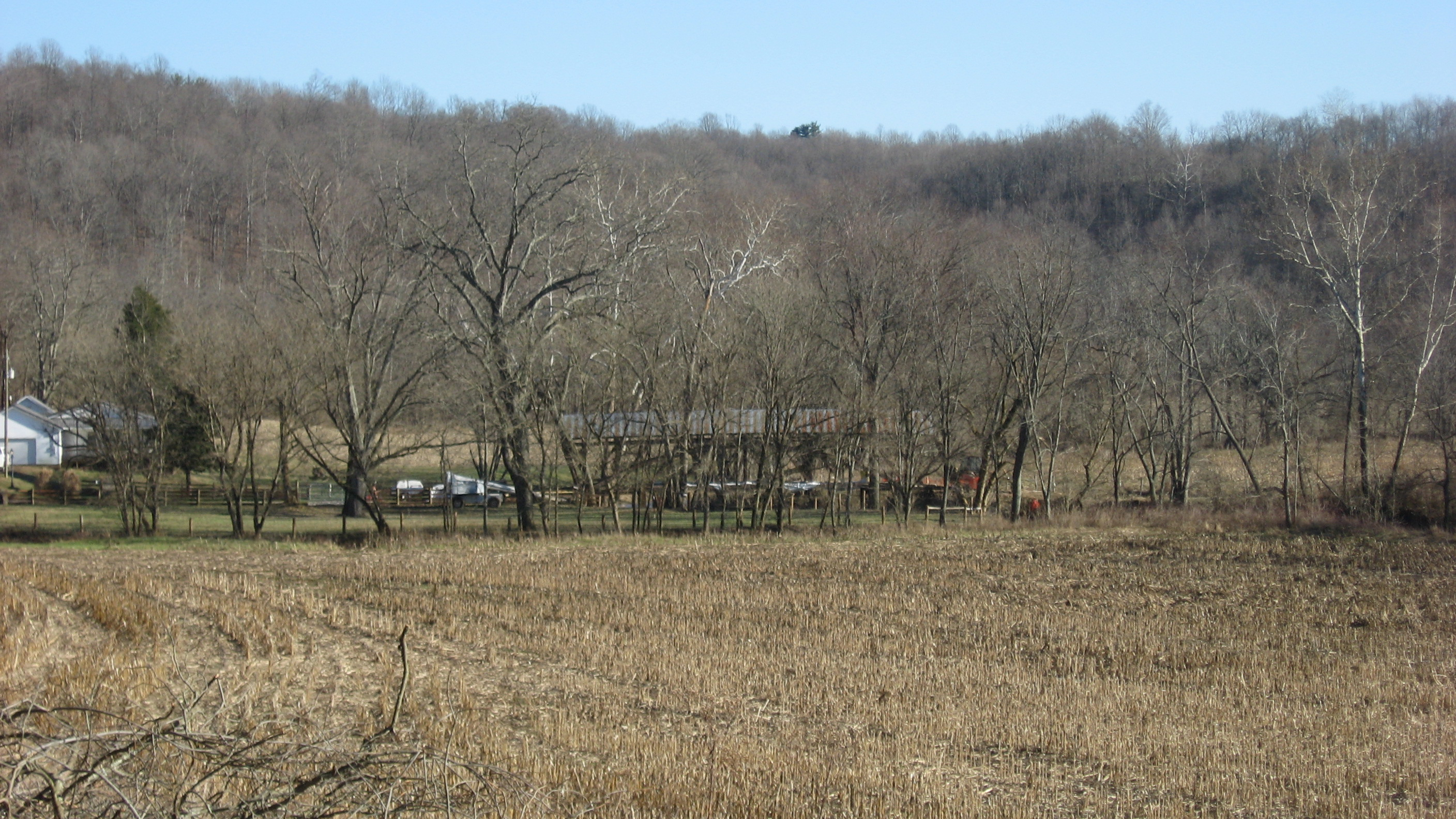

- Location within Ohio
- Nearest city: Chesterhill, Ohio
- Coordinates: 39°30′10″N 81°50′03″W
- Area: less than one acre
- Built: 1872
- Architect: Shrake, John; Kirby, E.W.
- Architectural style: Covered bridge
- NRHP reference No.: 99000097
- Added to NRHP: February 5, 1999

The Barkhurst Mill Covered Bridge, near Chesterhill, Ohio and also known as Williams Covered Bridge, was built in 1872. It was listed on the National Register of Historic Places in 1999.

It was built by Benjamin and John Pierpoint in 1872. As of 2017, the bridge is at the end of a township road and appears to have been abandoned.

It was a work of John Shrake and of E.W. Kirby.
