= Jediah Hill Covered Bridge =

- U.S. National Register of Historic Places
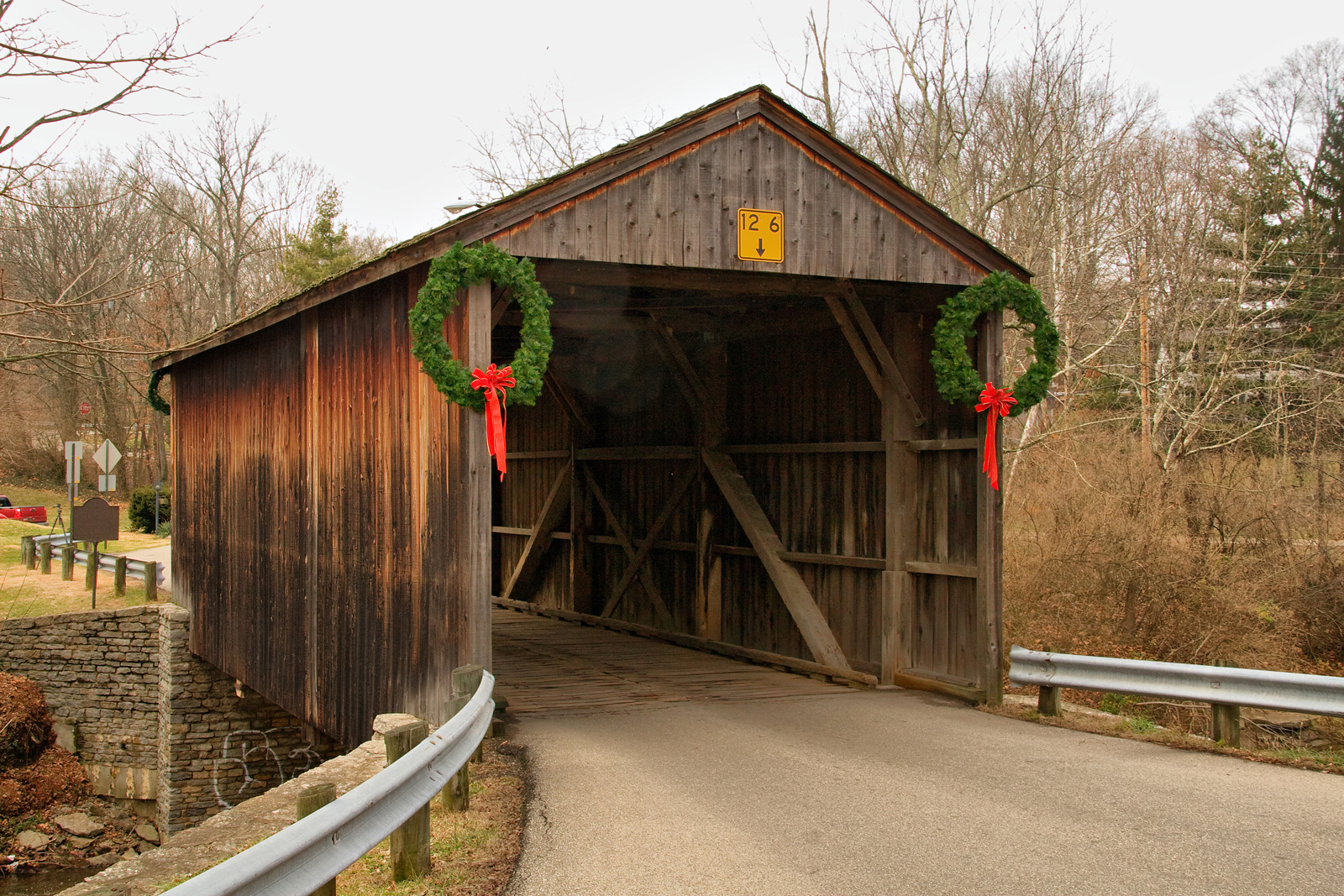

- Location within Ohio Location within the United States
- Nearest city: Cincinnati, Ohio
- Coordinates: 39°15′08.6″N 84°32′43.3″W
- Built: 1850
- Architect: Jediah Hill
- NRHP reference No.: 73001460
- Added to NRHP: March 28, 1973

Jediah Hill Covered Bridge is a historic bridge near Cincinnati, Ohio. It was listed in the National Register of Historic Places in 1973. The wooden covered bridge was built in 1850.
