= Eakin Mill Covered Bridge =

- U.S. National Register of Historic Places
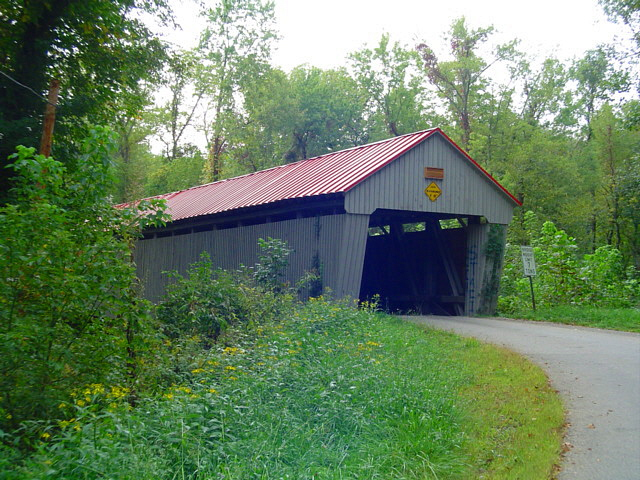
- Northern side of the bridge

- Location within Ohio Location within the United States
- Location: Mound Hill Rd., Arbaugh, Ohio
- Coordinates: 39°10′16″N 82°20′13″W
- Area: less than one acre
- Built: 1870
- Architect: Gilman & Ward Co.
- Architectural style: King post truss
- NRHP reference No.: 76001539
- Added to NRHP: March 16, 1976

The Eakin Mill Covered Bridge (also known as the "McLaughlin Bridge" or the "Geer's Mill Bridge") is a historic covered bridge in Vinton County, Ohio, United States. Located southeast of the county seat of McArthur, this bridge carries Mound Hill Road near the community of Arbaugh.

Built in 1870, the Eakin Mill Bridge was constructed across the Big Raccoon Creek by the McArthur contracting firm of Gilman and Ward. Like many other covered bridges built in Ohio during the late nineteenth century, the Eakin Mill Bridge features the king post truss design; unlike most others, this bridge was built with multiple king posts, enabling it to be significantly stronger than the average bridge that was built with a single king post. This sturdiness was necessitated by the Eakin Mill, a busy gristmill along the Big Raccoon; many other covered bridges spanned the stream, but the frequent mill traffic forced the builders to use an extraordinarily strong design. Gilman and Ward built their bridge on stone piers and roofed it with metal; like many other covered bridges, its walls are weatherboarded.

With the developments of modern truck transportation, the Eakin Mill Covered Bridge became less well suited to daily operation. Many trucks crossed the bridge while carrying loads heavier than they were permitted to carry, and the bridge sustained significant structural damage; accordingly, it was closed and replaced. Nevertheless, the bridge remains in its original location, and it has been designated a historic site. In 1976, the Eakin Mill Covered Bridge was listed on the National Register of Historic Places, qualifying both because of its historically significant engineering and because of its place in Ohio's history.
