= Germantown Covered Bridge =

- Formerly listed on the U.S. National Register of Historic Places
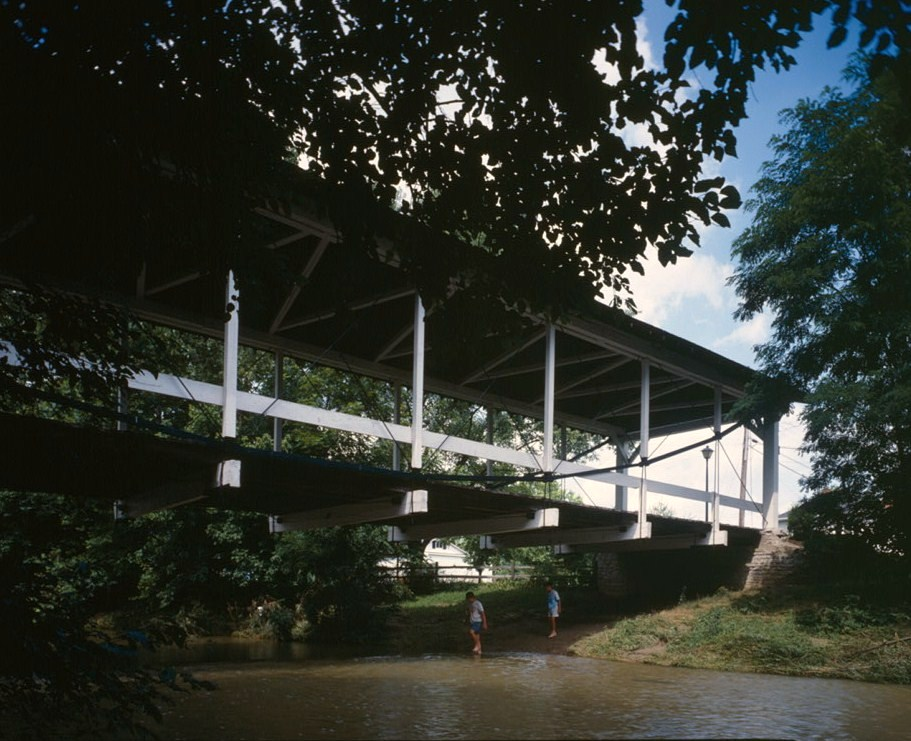

- Location within Ohio
- Location: Center Street, over Little Twin Creek, Germantown, Ohio
- Coordinates: 39°37′34″N 84°21′54″W
- Area: less than one acre
- Built: 1870
- Architectural style: Inverted bowstring bridge
- NRHP reference No.: 71000647

Significant dates
- Added to NRHP: September 3, 1971
- Removed from NRHP: 1981

The Germantown Covered Bridge, in Germantown, Ohio, was built in 1870, restored in 1963, and moved from its original location over Little Creek on the Dayton Pike to its present location on East Center St. in 1911. The design was an inverted bowstring.

The structure was listed on the National Register of Historic Places in 1971. However, it was delisted from the National Register after being destroyed by a vehicle in 1981. Pieces of the bridge were used in the subsequent reconstruction; it was then designated for use by pedestrians only.

It was documented by the Historic American Engineering Record in 1992.

== See also ==
- List of bridges documented by the Historic American Engineering Record in Ohio
