= Belle Hall Covered Bridge =

- U.S. National Register of Historic Places
- Location within Ohio
- Nearest city: Croton, Ohio
- Coordinates: 40°14′08″N 82°38′26″W
- Area: less than one acre
- Built: 1879
- Architectural style: Multiple kingpost truss plan
- NRHP reference No.: 76001464
- Added to NRHP: October 22, 1976

The Belle Hall Covered Bridge, east of Croton, Ohio, was a covered bridge which was built in 1879. It was listed on the National Register of Historic Places in 1976.

It spanned the little Otter Fork, a tributary of the north fork of the Licking River. It is a single-span wooden truss bridge, built by an unknown builder. In 1999, it was one of only seven surviving covered bridges in Licking County, Ohio, out of about 80 which once existed.

The bridge was named for a lady, Belle Hall, who lived nearby.

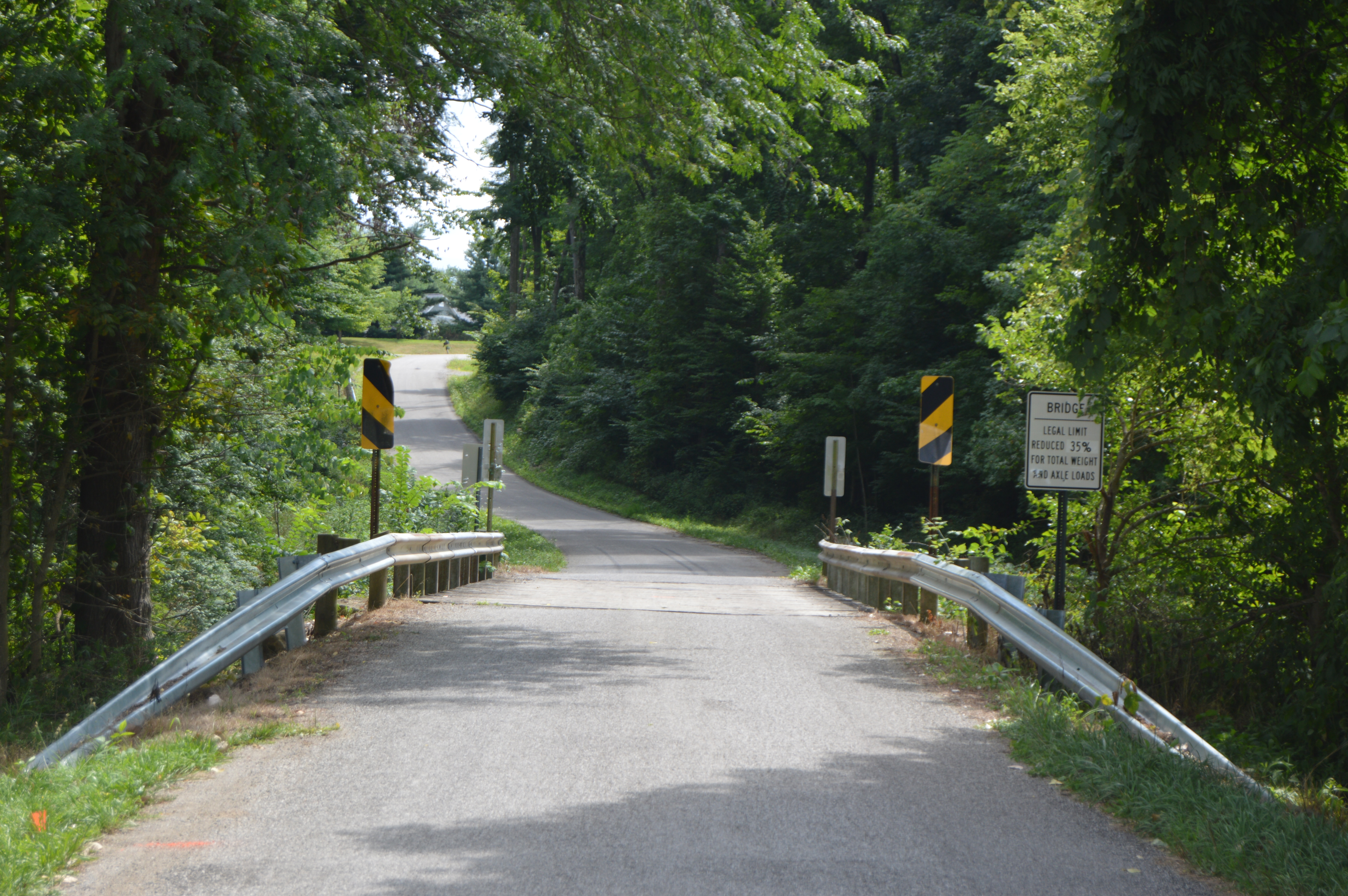
Replacement bridge incorporating parts of historic bridge

The bridge collapsed under heavy snow in January 1999. It was replaced by a contemporary girder bridge which has an unusual wooden deck: the deck and its supports were salvaged for re-use from the historic bridge.
