= Lansing Manor House =

Historic house in New York, United States

- U.S. National Register of Historic Places
- U.S. Historic district
- New York State Register of Historic Places
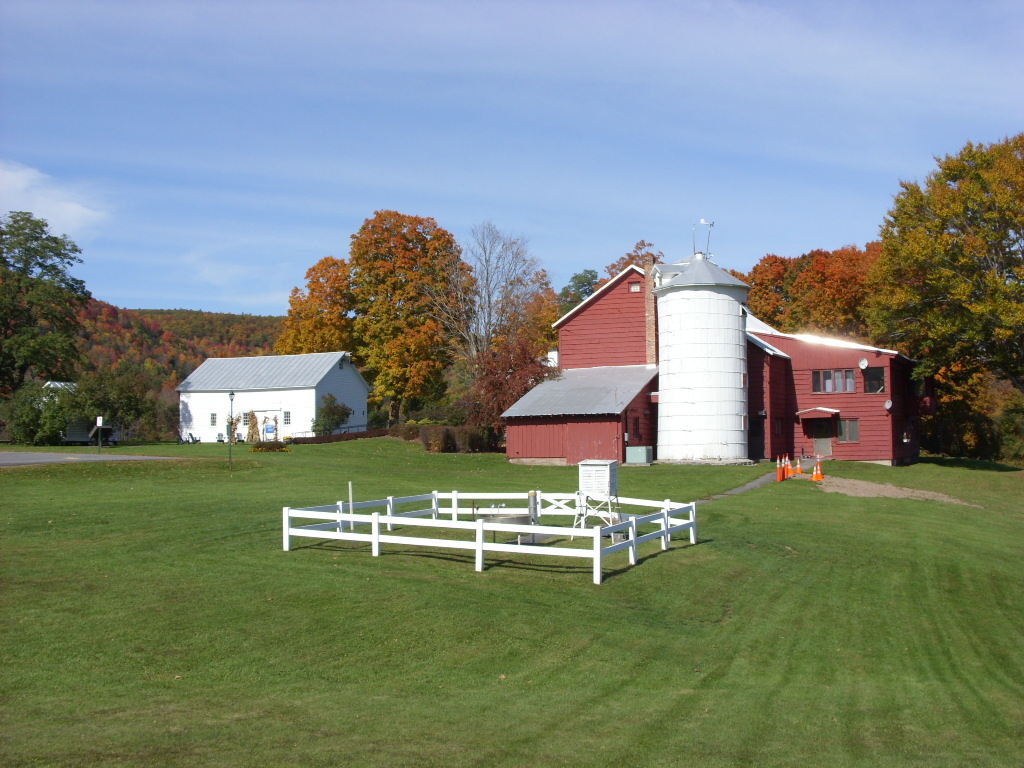
- Lansing Manor Barn, October 2008

- Location within New York Location within the United States
- Nearest city: Blenheim, New York
- Coordinates: 42°27′4″N 74°27′54″W
- Area: 300 acres (120 ha)
- Built: 1819
- NRHP reference No.: 73001268
- NYSRHP No.: 09501.000178

Significant dates
- Added to NRHP: May 25, 1973
- Designated NYSRHP: June 23, 1980

The Lansing Manor House is a historic home located in North Blenheim, Schoharie County, New York, United States, adjacent to the Blenheim-Gilboa Visitors Center and Mine Kill State Park. It was built in 1819 by John Lansing Jr. for his daughter and son-in-law, Jacob Livingston Sutherland. John Lansing Jr. represented New York as a delegate to the Constitutional Convention in 1787, and the state's Ratification Convention in 1788.

The manor house is a two-story, 46-feet square house with a hipped roof. It has brick-lined, wood-frame construction on the first floor and wood frame on the second. It features a five bay, one story porch along the front facade. Also on the property are: a shed and former summer kitchen, a well and its cover, outhouse, ice house, milk house, barn and silos, a possible guest / tenant house, and several other outbuildings.

The manor house was restored by the New York Power Authority in 1977, and is filled with authentic furnishings from the first half of the 19th century. The property, which is listed in the National Register of Historic Places as a national historic district, is operated by the Power Authority in cooperation with the Schoharie County Historical Society.

== Gallery ==
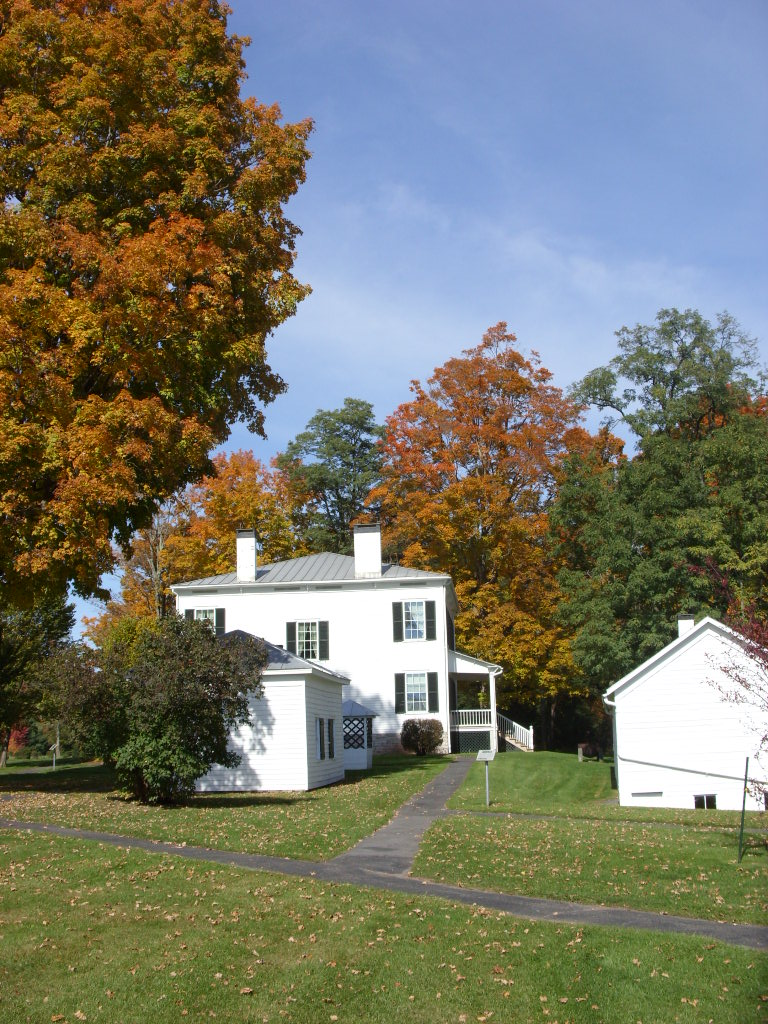
Lansing Manor House, October 2008

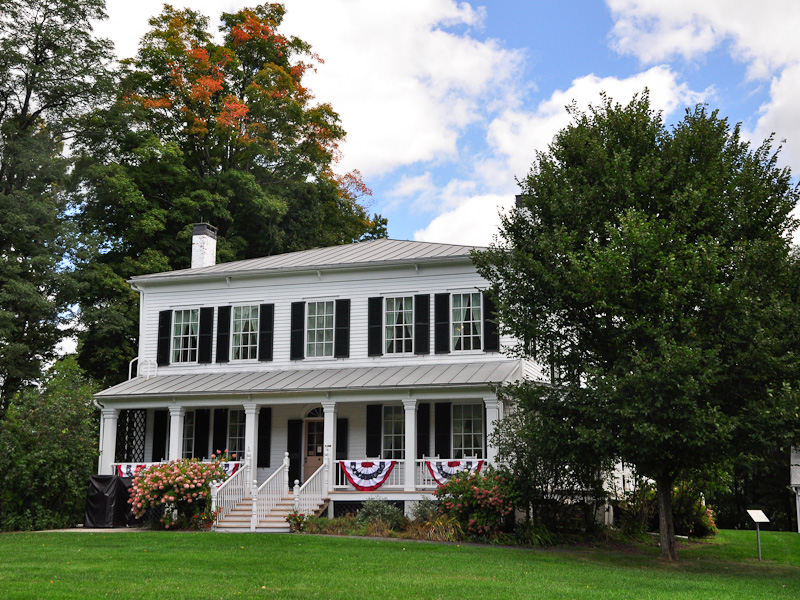
Lansing Manor House, September 2010
