= Mine Kill State Park =

State park in Schoharie County, New York

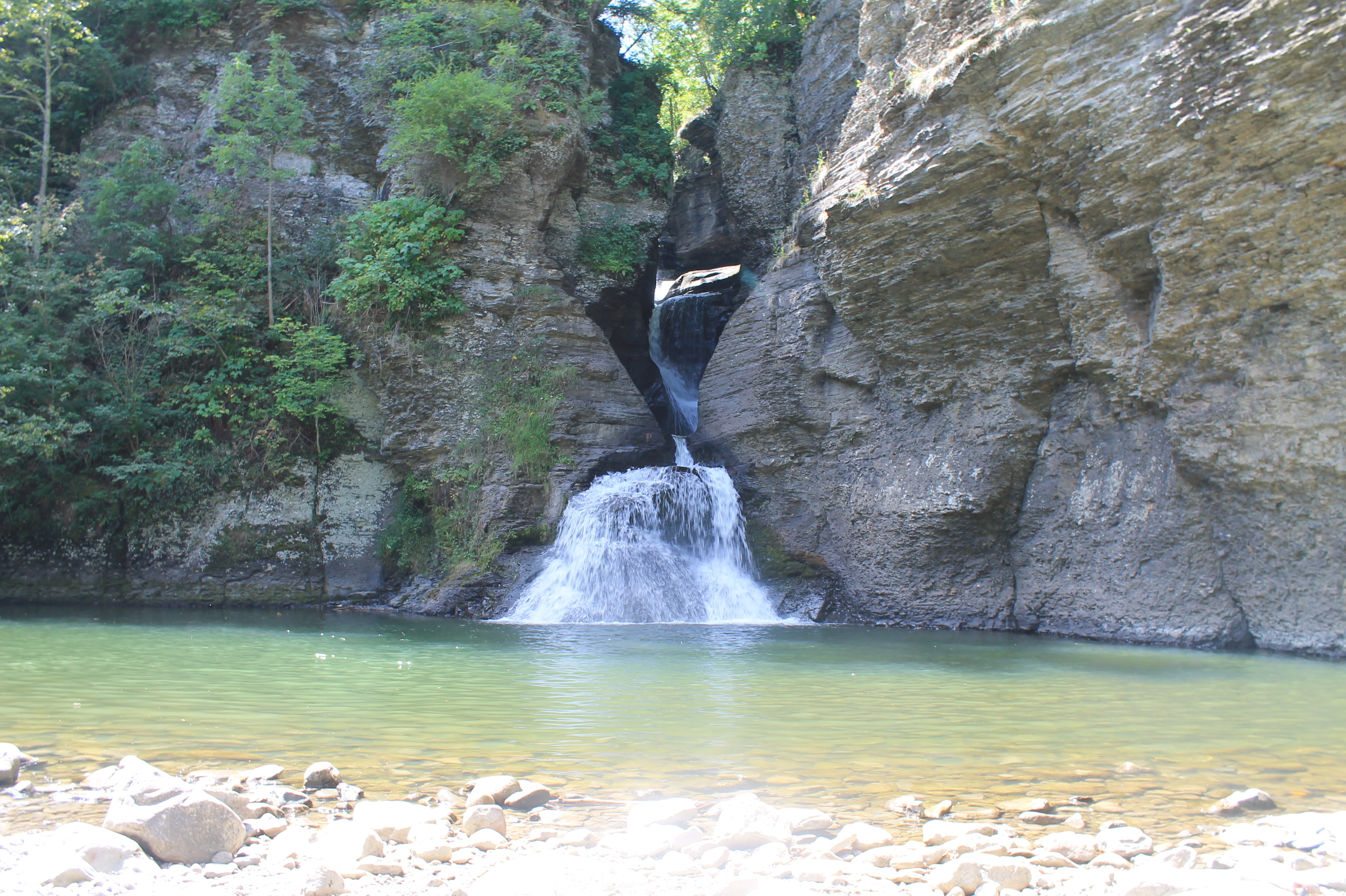
- Mine Kill Falls at Mine Kill State Park

- Location within New York
- Type: State park
- Location: 161 Mine Kill State Park; North Blenheim, New York
- Coordinates: 42°26′08″N 74°27′37″W
- Area: 500 acres (2.0 km^{2})
- Created: 1973
- Operator: New York State Office of Parks, Recreation and Historic Preservation
- Visitors: 84,343 (in 2014)
- Open: All year
- Website: Mine Kill State Park

Mine Kill State Park is a 500-acre (2.0 km^{2}) state park located in Schoharie County, New York, United States. The park is in the southeast part of the Town of Blenheim.

== Park description ==
Mine Kill State Park opened in 1973. It is named for Mine Kill Creek, which runs through a narrow gorge in the park and features the 80-foot (24 m) Mine Kill Falls. The park is located adjacent to the Blenheim-Gilboa Reservoir and its inflow, Schoharie Creek.

Mine Kill offers year-round recreation, including disc golf, snowmobiling, cross-country skiing, snowshoeing, fishing (trout and walleye), boating, hiking, mountain-biking, and swimming. The park features an Olympic-sized swimming pool, a diving pool, a wading pool, and a bath house. Located at the park is a pavilion which may be rented for private parties. There is a playground, numerous picnic tables, and charcoal grills on site.

Among the park's 6.5 miles (10.5 km) of trails is a 3.5-mile (5.6 km) section of the Long Path.

Starting in 2015, fees for parking and swimming at the park were waived for all visitors. The elimination of the fees was accomplished through an agreement with the New York Power Authority, who will compensate the New York State Office of Parks, Recreation and Historic Preservation $20,000 annually to offset lost revenue. Fees will continue to be charged for camping and picnic shelter reservations.

== See also ==
- List of New York state parks
