= Marcy South =

Power line in New York, US

Location
- Country: United States
- State: New York
- From: Marcy Substation
- To: Fraser Substation / Coopers Corners Substation

Ownership information
- Owner: New York Power Authority

Technical information
- Current type: AC
- AC voltage: 345,000
- No. of circuits: 2

Marcy South is a 2 circuit high voltage power line in the U.S. State of New York. Each circuit is 345,000 volts, the one circuit runs from Fraser Substation in Delaware County to Marcy Substation in Oneida County and the other circuit runs from Coopers Corners Substation to the Marcy Substation. It was constructed amid heavy controversy in the late 1980s by the New York Power Authority.

== History ==
The Power Authority of the State of New York announced plans to deliver hydroelectric power from Canada to the New York City area in 1982. As part of this project, significant improvements in the state's transmission infrastructure – including a new high-voltage transmission line measuring approximately 180 miles (290 km) – would be constructed, in order for imports from Hydro-Québec to more efficiently and directly reach the New York metropolitan area.

It became fully operational on June 1, 1988.

== Controversy ==
The Marcy South power line met with vigorous – and sometimes highly contentious and violent – opposition from local property owners from its proposition to its planning and surveying, and even its construction.

== Power grid improvement ==
The Marcy South Series Compensation Project began in 2016 and involved the installation of three series capacitor banks. The capacitor banks were installed to raise the voltage and keep it constant, which enhances transmission efficiency. Two capacitor banks were installed by New York Power Authority, the other installed by NYSEG at the Fraser Substation.

== Future plans ==
Since its construction, other projects including a high-voltage direct current (HVDC) transmission line have been proposed for the same route.

== See also ==
- Y-49 Cable
- Y-50 Cable
