= Mill Creek (West Kill) =

River in New York

Location
- Country: United States
- State: New York

Physical characteristics
- Mouth: West Kill
  - location: North Blenheim, New York, United States
  - coordinates: 42°28′08″N 74°27′36″W
- Basin size: 7.58 mi^{2} (19.6 km^{2})

Mill Creek is a river that converges with West Kill by North Blenheim, New York.
