= Betty Brook (West Kill tributary) =

Location
- Country: United States
- State: New York

Physical characteristics
- Mouth: West Kill
  - location: North Blenheim, New York, United States
  - coordinates: 42°29′15″N 74°30′40″W
- Basin size: 8.44 mi^{2} (21.9 km^{2})

Betty Brook converges with West Kill by North Blenheim, New York.
