= Ashtabula River =

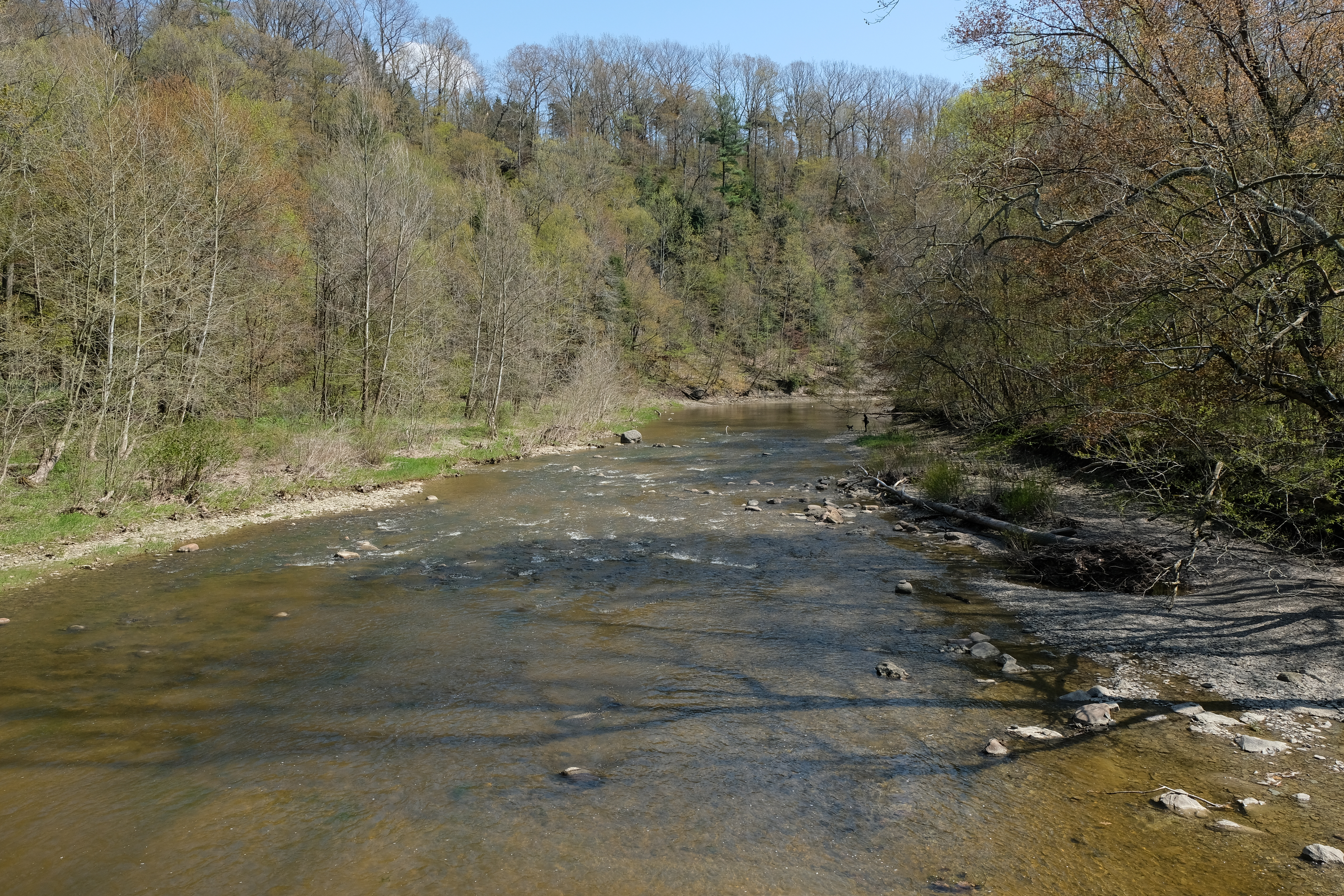
- The Ashtabula River as viewed from the Riverview Covered Bridge

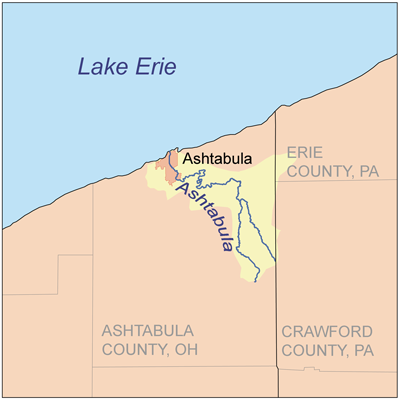
- Map of the Ashtabula River and its watershed

Location
- Country: United States of America
- State: Ohio
- County: Ashtabula County

Physical characteristics
- Source
  - location: Confluence of east and west branches in Monroe Township, Ashtabula County
  - coordinates: 41°48′51″N 80°36′57″W
  - elevation: 850 feet (260 m)
- Mouth
  - location: Lake Erie at Ashtabula, Ohio
  - coordinates: 41°54′36″N 80°47′55″W
  - elevation: 571 feet (174 m)
- Length: 40 miles (64 km)
- Basin size: 137 square miles (350 km^{2})
- Discharge
  - location: mouth
  - average: 220.72 cu ft/s (6.250 m^{3}/s) (estimate)

The Ashtabula River is a river located northeast of Cleveland in Ohio. The river flows into Lake Erie at the city of Ashtabula, Ohio. It is 40 miles (64 km) in length and drains 137 square miles (350 km^{2}).

== Name ==
Ashtabula derives from Lenape language ashte-pihële, 'always enough (fish) to go around, to be given away', a contraction from apchi 'always' + tepi 'enough' + hële (verb of motion).

According to the Geographic Names Information System, the Ashtabula River has also been known as:

- Ashtibula River
- Riviere Auscubalu
- Riviere Oscubolu

== Watershed ==
On October 30, 2008 the river was designated a State Scenic River by the Director of the Ohio Department of Natural Resources.

=== Pollution ===
In 1985 the first two miles of the river was named an "Area of Concern" by the International Joint Commission, primarily because of Fields Brook, a tributary that had received discharges from 19 industries between the 1940s and 1970s. The cleanup was deemed complete in 2014 and the river was delisted in 2021.

=== Tributaries ===
- Fields Brook
- Strong Brook
- Hubbard Run
- Ashtabula Creek
- West Branch Ashtabula River
- East Branch Ashtabula River

== See also ==
- List of rivers of Ohio
- Ashtabula River railroad disaster (1876)
- Smolen–Gulf Bridge, a covered bridge across the river (2008–present)
- USS Ashtabula (AO-51)
