= West Kill (North Blenheim, Schoharie Creek tributary) =

Location
- Country: United States
- State: New York

Physical characteristics
- Source
  - location: Schoharie County, New York
- Mouth: Schoharie Creek
  - location: North Blenheim, Schoharie County, New York, United States
  - coordinates: 42°28′03″N 74°27′20″W
- Basin size: 45.6 sq mi (118 km^{2})

Basin features
- Tributaries
  - left: Wharton Hollow Creek; Betty Brook
  - right: Mill Creek

West Kill flows into the Schoharie Creek by North Blenheim, New York. A different West Kill flows into Schoharie Creek further south.
