= Blenheim–Gilboa Hydroelectric Power Station =

Power station in Schoharie County, New York

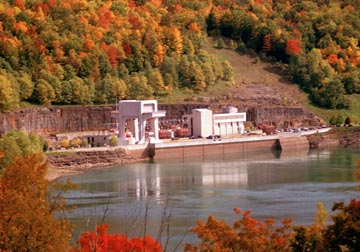
- Interactive map of Blenheim–Gilboa Hydroelectric Power Station
- Country: United States
- Location: Blenheim / Gilboa, Schoharie County, Catskill Mountains, New York, USA
- Coordinates: 42°27′18″N 74°27′29″W
- Owner: NYPA

Reservoir
- Total capacity: 19,000,000 m^{3} (5.0×10^{9} US gal)

Power Station
- Installed capacity: 1,134 MW (1,521,000 hp)

The Blenheim–Gilboa Pumped Storage Power Station is a pumped-storage hydroelectricity plant in the Catskill Mountains of New York State. The plant is part of the New York Power Authority, and can generate over 1,100 megawatts (1,500,000 hp) of electricity. It is used daily to cover peak demand. There are two reservoirs that are involved in the project, with a combined capacity of 5 billion US gallons (19,000,000 m^{3}); one at the foot of Brown Mountain in the Schoharie Valley, and another one at the top of the mountain. The power station has an accumulated capacity of about 12,000 megawatt-hours (43,000 GJ) after storing up to 17,000 megawatt-hours (61,000 GJ).

The reservoir at the foot of the mountain (42°28′00″N 74°27′30″W) was created by impounding the Schoharie Creek downstream from the village of Gilboa, New York. Water from this reservoir is sent through a concrete shaft up the mountain to the upper reservoir (42°26′40″N 74°25′35″W) to be stored until it is needed. When power is needed, the water is sent back down the mountain into the lower reservoir, where it enters a power plant on the banks of the lower reservoir, and spins a series of turbines in the powerhouse. (This structure is almost completely underwater; only five feet of it can be seen above water when the reservoir is full). The water is sent back into the reservoir, flows over the dam that holds the reservoir back, and continues down the rest of the Schoharie Creek. The powerhouse, built in 1973, contained four Hitachi 260 megawatts (350,000 hp) pump/turbine units. The gross head range on the units is 1,066 to 1,142 feet (325 to 348 m). Between 2003 and 2010, the turbines were upgraded so that each generator/motor operates at up to approximately 318 MVA at 0.9 power factor pumping power, or 286 megawatts (384,000 hp) as a generator. Additionally, the old 285 MVA generator step up transformers were replaced with new 17kV/345kV, 325 MVA transformers. Overall plant cycle efficiency is 73%.

== Blenheim–Gilboa Visitors Center ==
The Blenheim-Gilboa Visitor Center is housed in a restored 18th century dairy barn, and features exhibits and interactive displays that demonstrate the science of energy and electricity, including how power is made and used. Admission to the center is free. The historic Lansing Manor House is a historic house museum adjacent to the Visitor Center. The Visitor Center, Lansing Manor House and the Power Project are located near Mine Kill State Park.

== See also ==
- List of power stations in the United States
- List of reservoirs and dams in New York
- New York energy law
