= Julia E. B. Brick =

American philanthropist

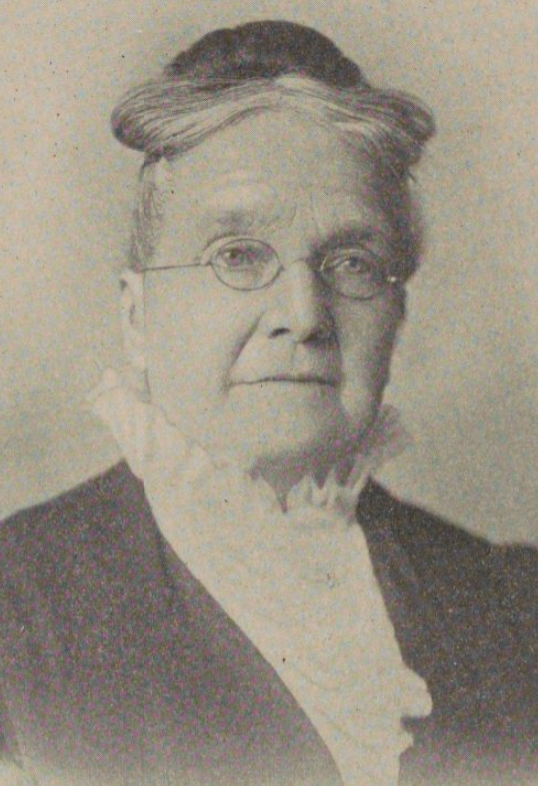
- Julia E. B. Brick, from a 1905-1906 catalog of the Joseph Keasbey Brick School
- Born: Julia Elma Brewster; August 6, 1819; Blenheim, New York
- Died: February 3, 1902; Brooklyn, New York
- Occupation: Philanthropist

Julia Elma Brewster Brick (August 6, 1819 – February 3, 1902) was an American philanthropist. In 1895, she donated land and funds for the creation of the Joseph Keasbey Brick Agricultural, Industrial and Normal School in North Carolina, which served Black students from 1895 to 1933.

== Early life ==
Brewster was born in Blenheim, New York, the daughter of farmers Horace Brewster and Lydia Brown Brewster (later Bump). She was descended from Mayflower passenger William Brewster.

== Philanthropy ==
Brick inherited her manufacturer husband's entire estate at his death in 1867, though his siblings contested the will in court proceedings that lasted for years. She "managed her trust wisely and beneficiently", donating money to the Brooklyn City Hospital, the Brooklyn Diet Dispensary, the Children's Aid Society, the Home for Aged Colored People, the Mariners' Family Asylum, the Brooklyn Home for Consumptives, and the Clinton Avenue Congregational Church. She was a member of the Tree Planting and Fountain Society of Brooklyn.

In 1895, Brick donated over a thousand acres and substantial money to the American Missionary Association for the creation of the Brick School. The Joseph Keasbey Brick Agricultural, Industrial and Normal School, near Enfield, North Carolina was a vocational training school for Black students, with Thomas Sewell Inborden (1865–1951) as its first principal. She visited the school annually with her niece, Lydia Benedict, and A. F. Beard, a secretary of the American Missionary Association. The school became Brick Junior College in 1926, and closed in 1933. There is a state historical marker about the Brick School in Edgecombe County. Two of the buildings are now occupied by the Franklinton Center at Bricks, a nonprofit community organization.

== Personal life and legacy ==
In 1844, Julia Brewster married engineer Joseph Keasbey Brick (1812–1867), founder of the Brooklyn Clay Retort & Fire Brick Works. They had three sons, all of whom died in infancy in the 1850s. Julia E. B. Brick died at home in 1902, aged 82 years. Her grave is with her husband's and sons', in Brooklyn's Green-Wood Cemetery.

Brick left nearly a million dollars to charities, with the largest part of her estate left to the Brick School and the American Missionary Association. This will was also contested by family members. There is a collection of school materials, the Willa Cofield Brick School Collection, 1895-1990s, archived at the Southern Historical Collection at the University of North Carolina.
