= Old Blenheim Bridge =

Covered bridge in North Blenheim, New York

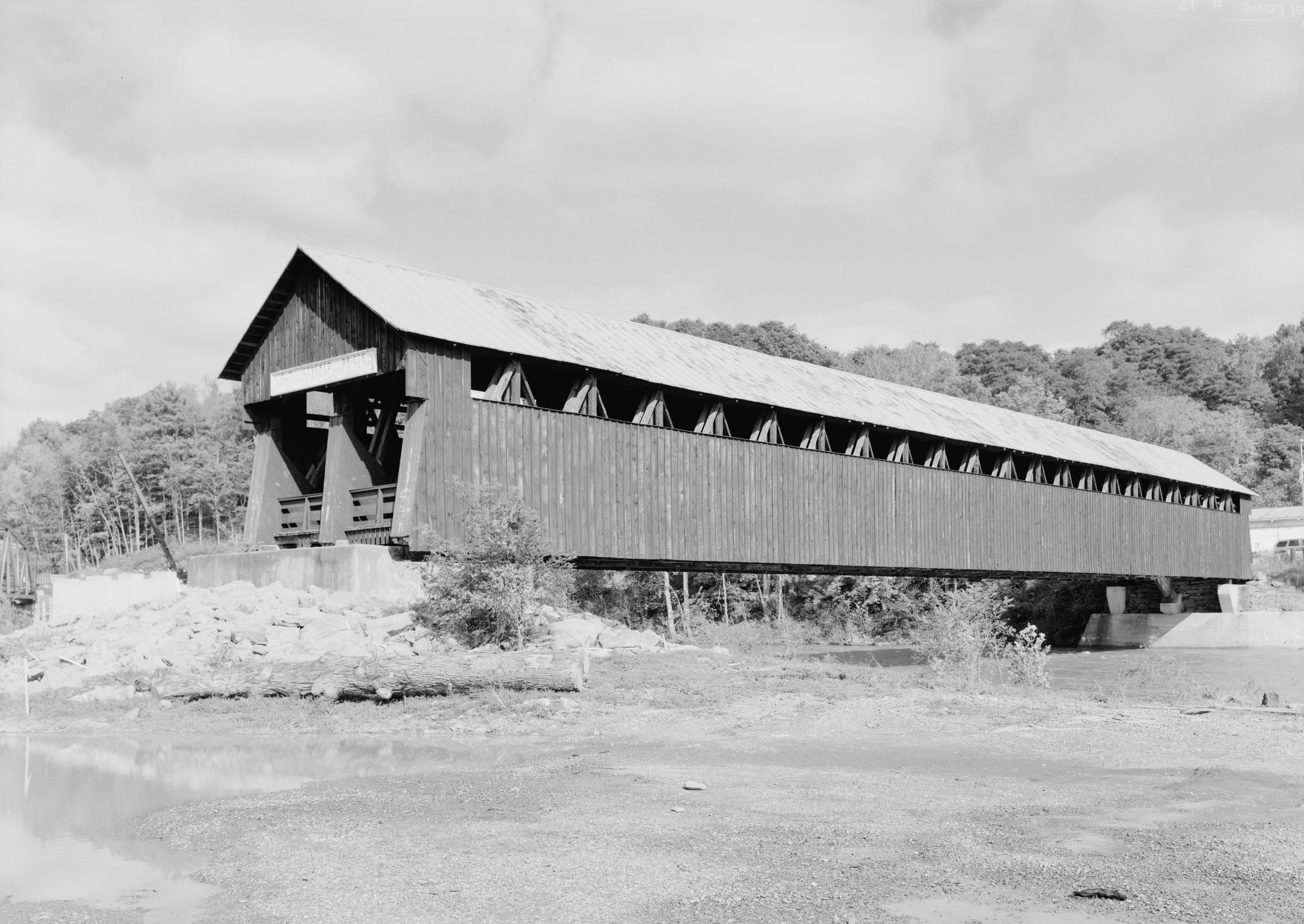
- HAER photo in 2004
- Coordinates: 42°28′23″N 74°26′28″W
- Carried: Vehicles (1855–1936); Pedestrians (1936–2011)
- Crossed: Schoharie Creek
- Locale: North Blenheim, NY

Characteristics
- Design: double-barreled long truss with center arch covered bridge
- Total length: 232 ft 0 in (70.7 m)
- Width: 26 ft 3 in (8.0 m)
- Height: 30 feet (9.1 m)
- Longest span: 210 feet (64 m)

History
- Designer: Nichols M. Powers
- Opened: 1855
- Collapsed: August 28, 2011
- Old Blenheim Bridge
- Formerly listed on the U.S. National Register of Historic Places
- Former U.S. National Historic Landmark
- Location within New York
- Location: North Blenheim, NY
- Coordinates: 42.471847°N 74.441906°W
- Area: Schoharie County
- Built: 1854–1855
- Architect: Nichols Montgomery Powers
- NRHP reference No.: 66000570

Significant dates
- Added to NRHP: October 15, 1966
- Designated NHL: January 29, 1964
- Removed from NRHP: July 21, 2015
- Delisted NHL: July 21, 2015

Location
- Interactive map of Old Blenheim Bridge

Old Blenheim Bridge was a wooden covered bridge that spanned Schoharie Creek in North Blenheim, New York, United States. With an open span of 210 feet (64 m), it had the second longest span of any surviving single-span covered bridge in the world. The 1862 Bridgeport Covered Bridge in Nevada County, California, currently undergoing repairs due to 1986 flooding (rebuild started in 2019) is longer overall at 233 feet (71 m) but is argued to have a 208 ft (63 m) clear span. The bridge, opened in 1855, was also one of the oldest of its type in the United States. It was destroyed by flooding resulting from Tropical Storm Irene in 2011. Rebuilding of the bridge commenced in 2017 and was completed in 2018.

== History ==
A group of local businessmen formed the Blenheim Bridge Company to construct the bridge. Nicholas Montgomery Powers was brought in from Vermont to build it. The bridge opened in 1855, and remained in use for vehicles until 1932, when a steel truss bridge was constructed nearby. Since then, the bridge was pedestrian only. It was declared a National Historic Landmark in 1964 and designated as a National Historic Civil Engineering Landmark by the American Society of Civil Engineers in 1983.

On August 28, 2011, record flooding along the Schoharie Creek, due to Tropical Storm Irene, resulted in the bridge being washed away and completely destroyed.

== Longest bridge ==
There is a great deal of conflicting information, and competing claims, about the Blenheim Bridge.

Many sources simply claimed the Old Blenheim Bridge as the longest surviving single-span covered bridge, which it was believed to be by total length of span. The Bridgeport Covered Bridge in California is longer in overall length. The New York Covered Bridge Society states that Blenheim bridge’s 219 feet (67 m) clear span was 2 feet (0.61 m) longer than "a bridge in California".

A report by the U.S. Department of the Interior states that the Bridgeport Covered Bridge (HAER No. CA-41) has clear spans of 210 feet (64 m) on one side and 208 feet (63 m) on the other, while Blenheim Bridge (HAER No. NY-331) had a documented clear span of 210 feet (64 m) in the middle (1936 HABS drawings). In August 2003, measurements of post-repair Blenheim Bridge abutments were 209 feet 2 inches (63.75 m) on the upstream side, and 205 feet 6 inches (62.64 m) on the downstream side.

Historically, the longest single-span covered bridge on record was Pennsylvania's McCall's Ferry Bridge with a claimed clear span of 360 feet (110 m) (built 1814–15, destroyed by ice jam 1817).

== Destruction ==
The bridge was destroyed on August 28, 2011, as a result of flooding from Tropical Storm Irene.

A witness saw its roof deposited onto a modern bridge just downstream, when the bridge was swept away at about 1 p.m. Over subsequent months, the Schoharie County Highway Department collected pieces of the bridge up to about 30 miles (48 km) downstream.

On July 21, 2015, National Historic Landmark designation for the bridge was withdrawn and the property was delisted from the National Register of Historic Places.

== Replacement ==
A replacement for the bridge was built in 2017, exactly reproducing the design of the original. It was built to stand 15 feet (4.6 m) higher to avoid future floods. Plans were for the bridge to "look and feel like it's the old bridge". Plans for replacement of the bridge took much time and effort; funding for reconstruction was at first opposed by FEMA, and the chair of a local committee characterized it as "a battle" to get approval.

The construction cost $6.7 million, funded 75 percent by FEMA and 25 percent by New York State; it was started in early 2017. Preserved pieces of the original bridge were included as a memorial. The construction contract was advertised with bids due in October 2016 by the New York State's Governor's Office on Storm Recovery. On October 3, 2018, PBS broadcast an episode of the Nova documentary TV series about the reconstruction.

== Gallery ==
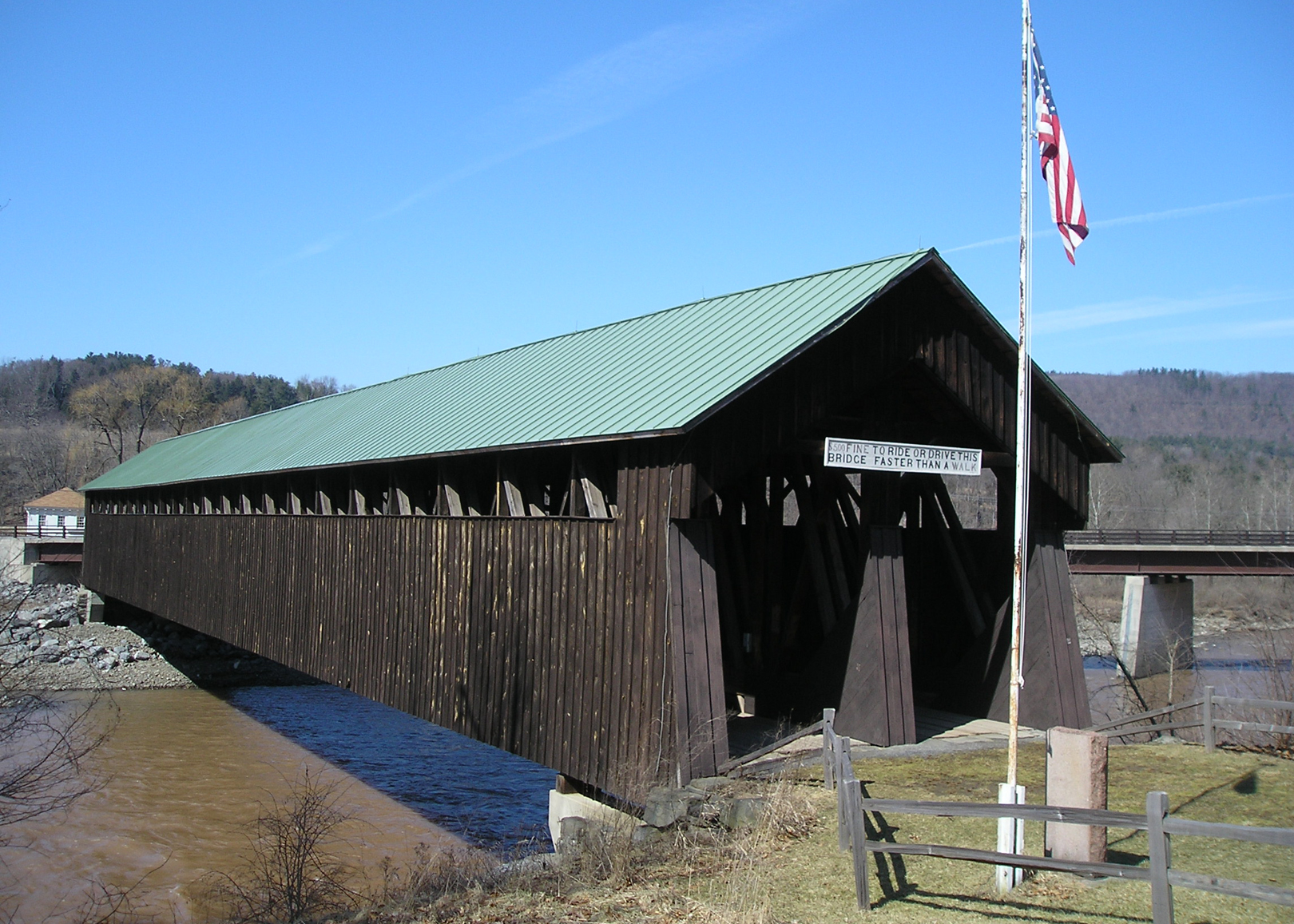
Oblique view as photographed from up the hill on the eastern shore

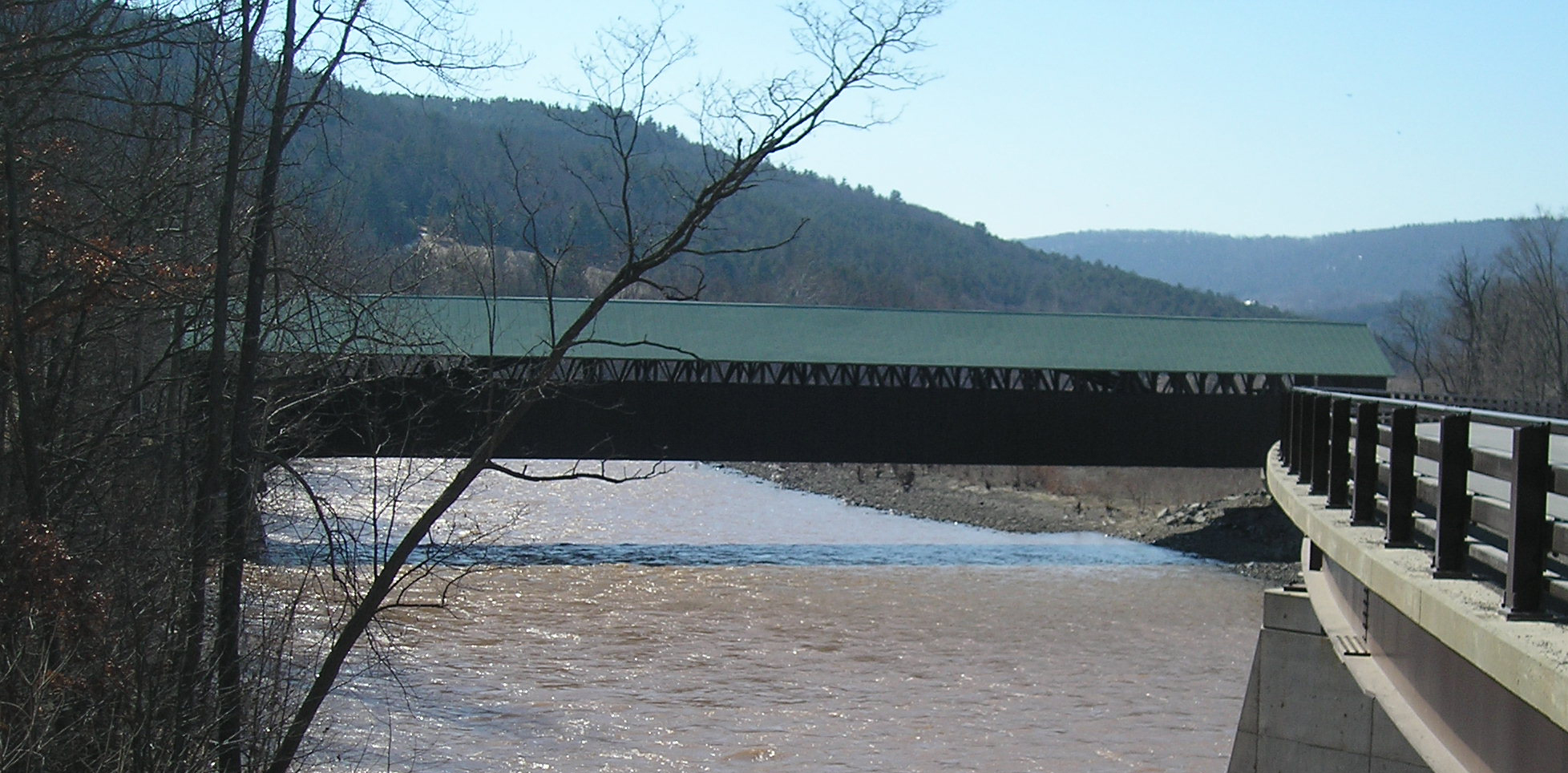
The span of the Old Blenheim Bridge as photographed 11 March 2008.

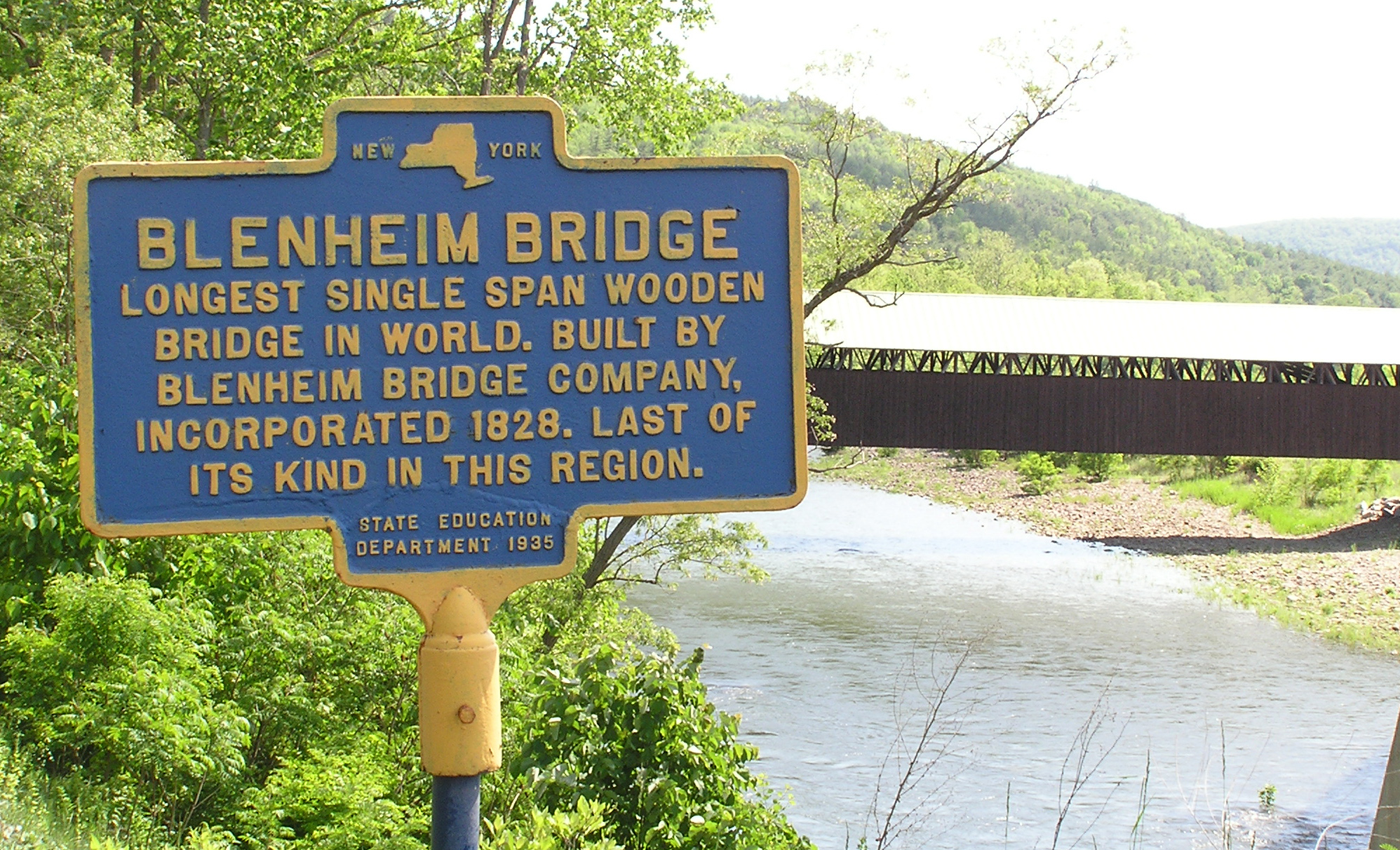
Old Blenheim Bridge NYS Education Dept. Historical Marker (with bridge in background) as photographed 29 May 2009

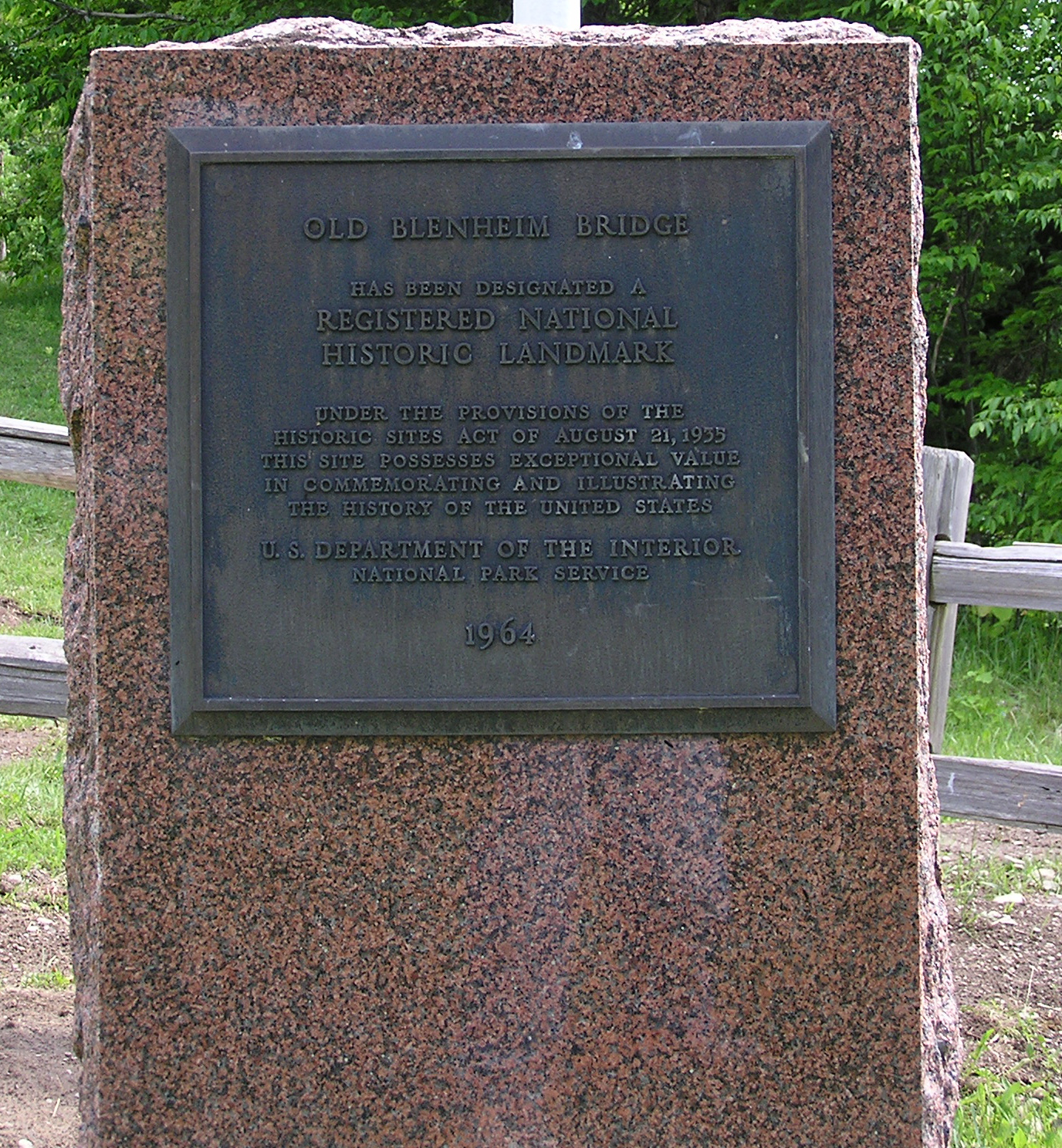
Registered National Historic Landmark Plaque

== See also ==
- List of bridges documented by the Historic American Engineering Record in New York
- Hartland Bridge – longest covered bridge (multiple spans) in the world; Hartland, New Brunswick
- Smolen–Gulf Bridge – longest covered bridge (multiple spans) in the United States, Ashtabula County, Ohio
- Bartonsville Covered Bridge - a shorter covered bridge in Rockingham, Vermont, also destroyed by Tropical Storm Irene, replaced in 2013; it still carries traffic
