= State Road Covered Bridge =

State Road Bridge
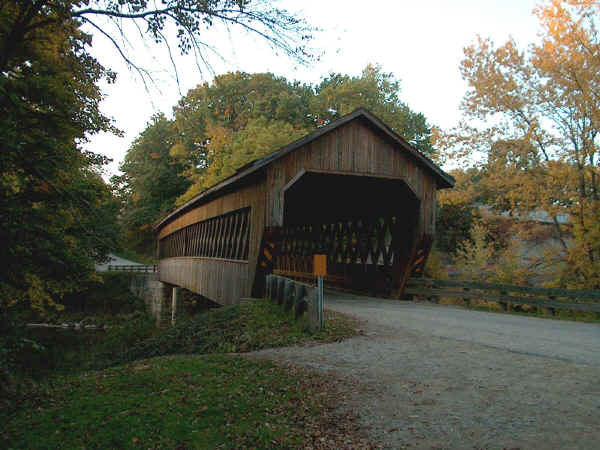
- Coordinates: 41°53′11″N 80°37′14″W
- Locale: Ashtabula County, Ohio, United States

Characteristics
- Design: single span, Town truss
- Total length: 157 feet (47.9 m)

History
- Constructed by: John Smolen Jr.
- Construction start: 1983

State Road Bridge is a covered bridge spanning Conneaut Creek in Monroe Township, Ashtabula County, Ohio, United States. The bridge, one of currently 17 drivable bridges in the county, is a single span Town truss design. Constructed of 97,000 feet (30,000 m) of southern pine and oak, it features a 4-foot-tall (1.2 m) window which extends the length of the bridge. The dedication of the bridge in 1983 was the forerunner of the Ashtabula County Covered Bridge Festival. The bridge’s WGCB number is 35-04-58, and it is located approximately 3.9 miles (6.3 km) east-southeast of North Kingsville.

State Road Bridge is not to be confused with a covered bridge on another State Road in the county, Smolen-Gulf Bridge.

== History ==
- 1983 – Bridge constructed.

The current structure replaced the original covered bridge on this site; that was built in 1831, by Ira Benton, and David Niles, for a cost of $100 and stood until 1898.

== Dimensions ==
- Span: 140 feet (42.7 m)
- Length: 157 feet (47.9 m)
- Width: 17 feet 6 inches (5.33 m)
- Height: 14 feet 6 inches (4.42 m)

== Gallery ==
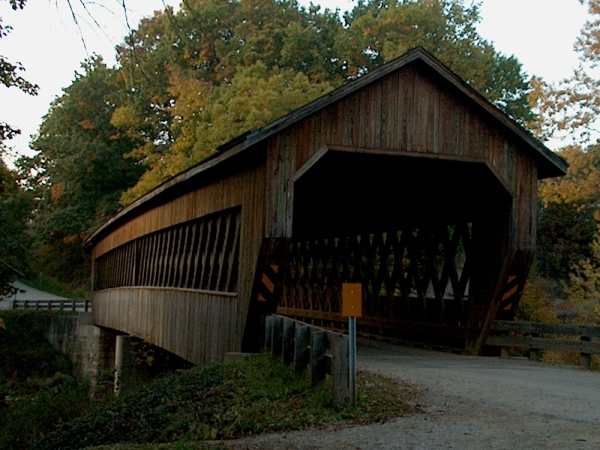
Closer view from the south

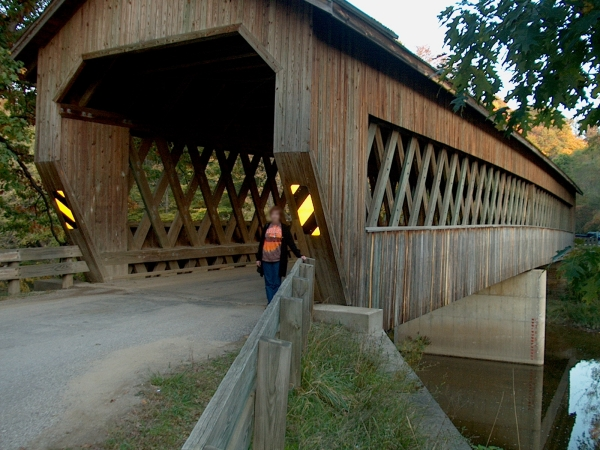
View from the southeast

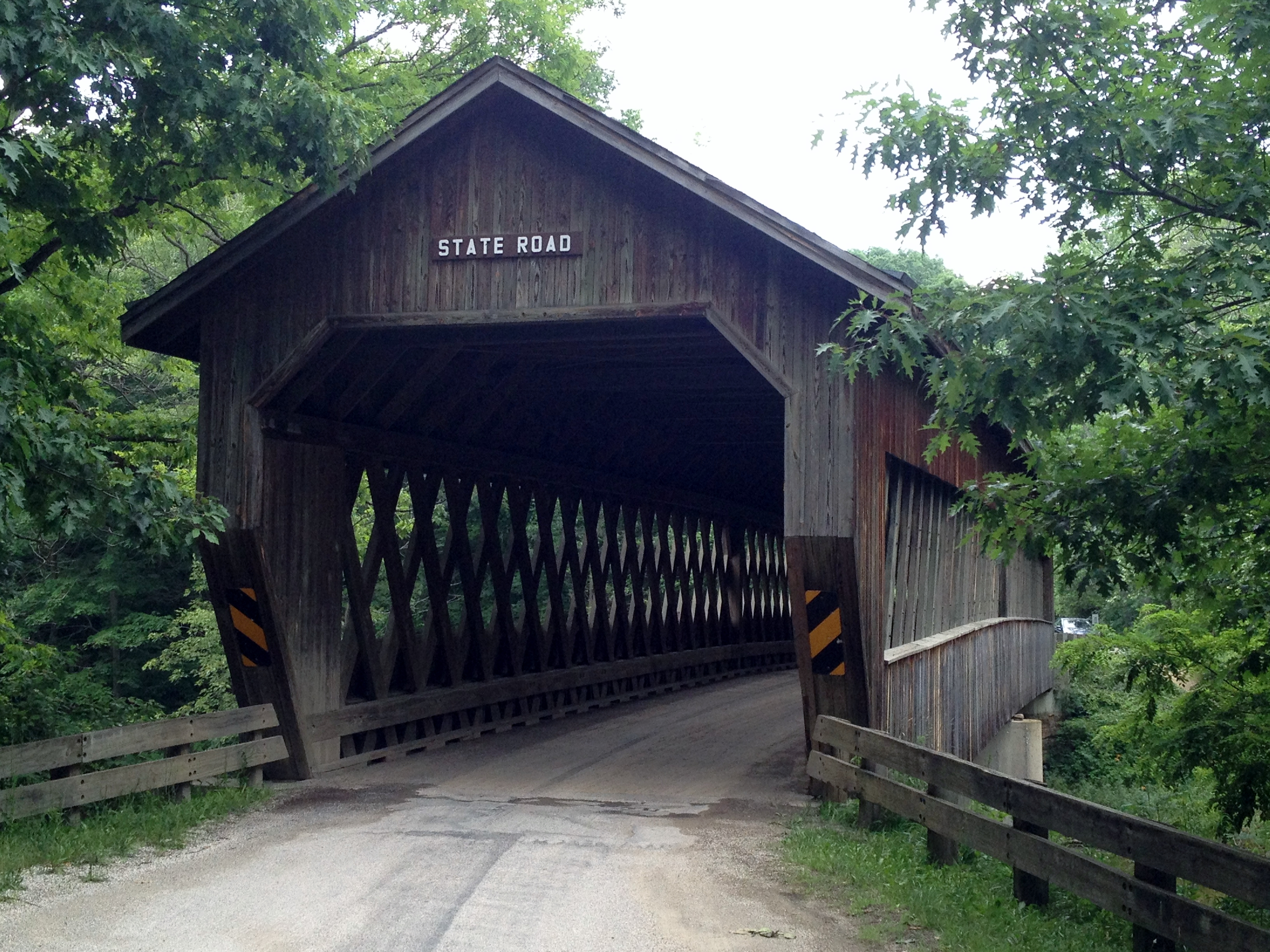

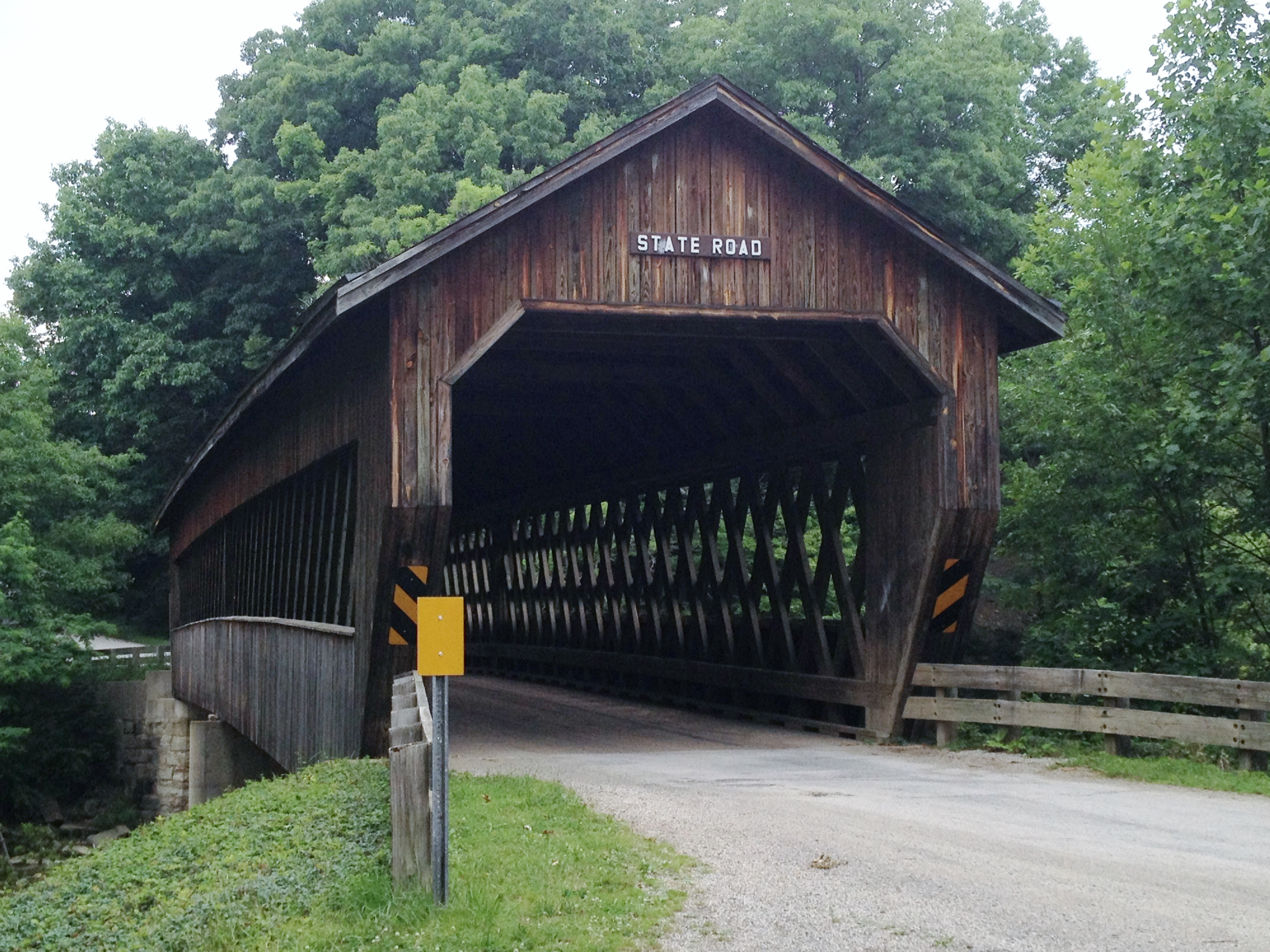

== See also ==
- List of Ashtabula County covered bridges
