= North Blenheim Historic District =

Historic district in New York, United States

- U.S. National Register of Historic Places
- U.S. Historic district
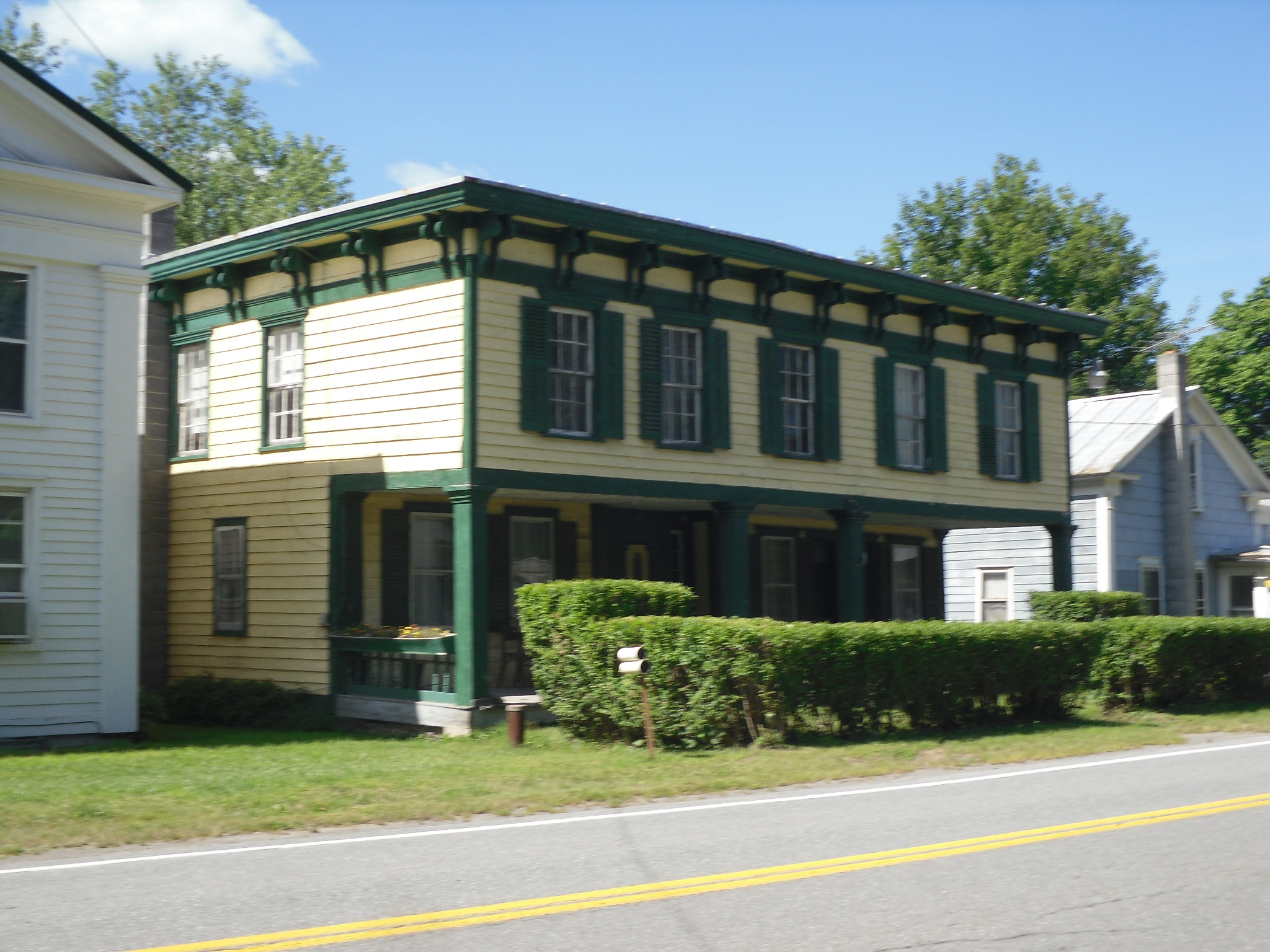
- Chapman House, July 2010

- Location within New York Location within the United States
- Location: Both sides of NY 30, beside Schoharie Creek, North Blenheim, New York
- Coordinates: 42°28′13″N 74°27′3″W
- Area: 28 acres (11 ha)
- Architect: Multiple
- Architectural style: Greek Revival
- NRHP reference No.: 74001303
- Added to NRHP: December 31, 1974

North Blenheim Historic District is a national historic district located at the hamlet of North Blenheim in Schoharie County, New York. The district includes 25 contributing buildings and one contributing site. Most of the buildings exhibit some influence from the vernacular Greek Revival style. Located within the district is an exceptional Greek Revival church built in 1841.

It was added to the National Register of Historic Places in 1974.
