= Justin Driscoll =

CEO of the New York Power Authority

Justin E. Driscoll
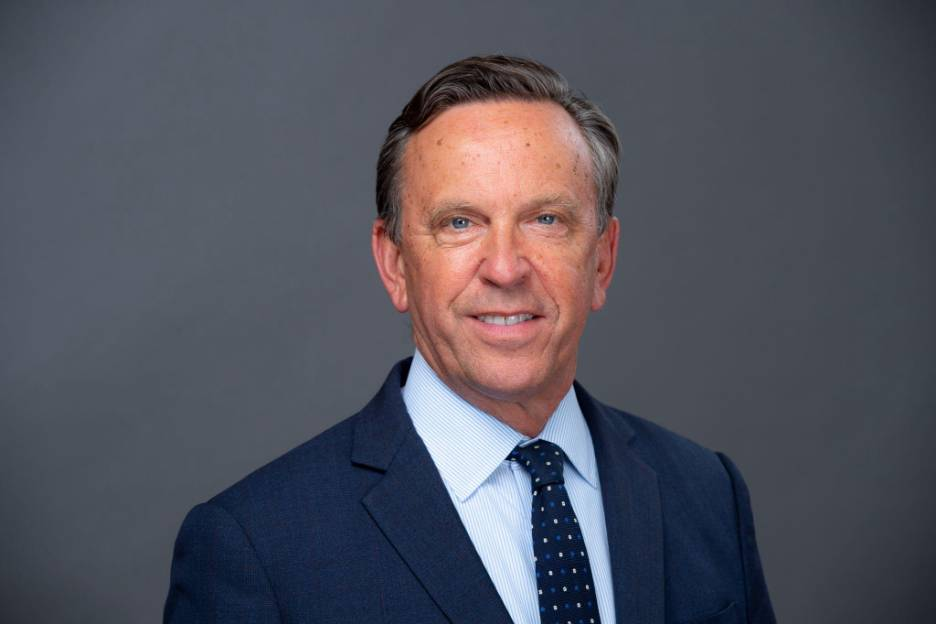

President and CEO of the New York Power Authority
- Incumbent
- Assumed office August 2023
- Preceded by: Gil C. Quiniones

Personal details
- Education: American University (BA); New York Law School (JD)

Justin E. Driscoll is president and CEO of the New York Power Authority, the largest government-owned electric utility in the United States.

== Career ==
After receiving his law degree from New York Law School in 1981, Driscoll entered private practice. In 1984, he was admitted to the bar of the Supreme Court of the United States. He then practiced within the civil branch of the Supreme Court for New York and Bronx counties. During his years of private practice, Driscoll represented large companies, governmental entities, and energy providers.

From 1995 to 2003, he represented the Dormitory Authority of the State of New York as outside litigation counsel. From 2005 to 2007, he was senior vice president and general counsel of the New York State Housing Finance Agency and the State of New York Mortgage Agency.

From 2008 to 2014, Driscoll was a partner at the lobbying firm Brown & Weinraub, where he specialized in "government relations, litigation, and public finance" according to Westchester magazine.

In September 2014, Driscoll became executive vice president and general counsel for the New York Power Authority, the largest state public power organization in the United States. His oversight responsibility included the NYPA's Ethics and Compliance division. Driscoll remained in this role for seven years.

In November 2021, NYPA president and CEO Gil Quiniones resigned and Driscoll assumed both roles in an interim capacity. In July 2022, New York Governor Kathy Hochul nominated Driscoll to take over both roles permanently. Driscoll, a Republican, faced resistance to his confirmation from New York City Democratic Socialists and the Public Power NY coalition, in part due to his opposition to the Build Public Renewables Act, which called for the NYPA to build renewable sources of power generation. Early in the Act's process, Driscoll had expressed concern that NYPA would fail to develop green energy at a lower cost than private industry.

In August 2023, Driscoll formally assumed the NYPA positions. As president and CEO, Driscoll oversees the NYPA's thousands of circuit-miles of high-voltage transmission and 17 generation facilities. He directs the public benefit corporation's function as a project developer and energy supplier for its state customers. In 2025, City & State stated that Driscoll was "bringing the New York Power Authority back to its nuclear roots" by implementing Hochul's nuclear power directives. Under Driscoll, NYPA updated its renewable energy plan and increased its goals for solar, wind, and energy storage in December 2025, and completed the Smart Path Connect project, which added around 1,000 megawatts of upstate hydropower and renewables, in June 2026.

Driscoll is also a board member of several energy-related organizations, including the Alliance to Save Energy, the Electric Power Research Institute, and the New York State Energy Research and Development Authority.

== Education ==
Driscoll graduated from American University in Washington, D.C. and attended NYU School of Law. He received his Juris Doctor degree from New York Law School, a private law school.

== Personal life ==
Driscoll grew up near Albany and resides in Rye, New York with his wife. The couple have three children and four grandchildren and have lived in Westchester County for over 30 years.
