= Blenheim, New York =

- Town
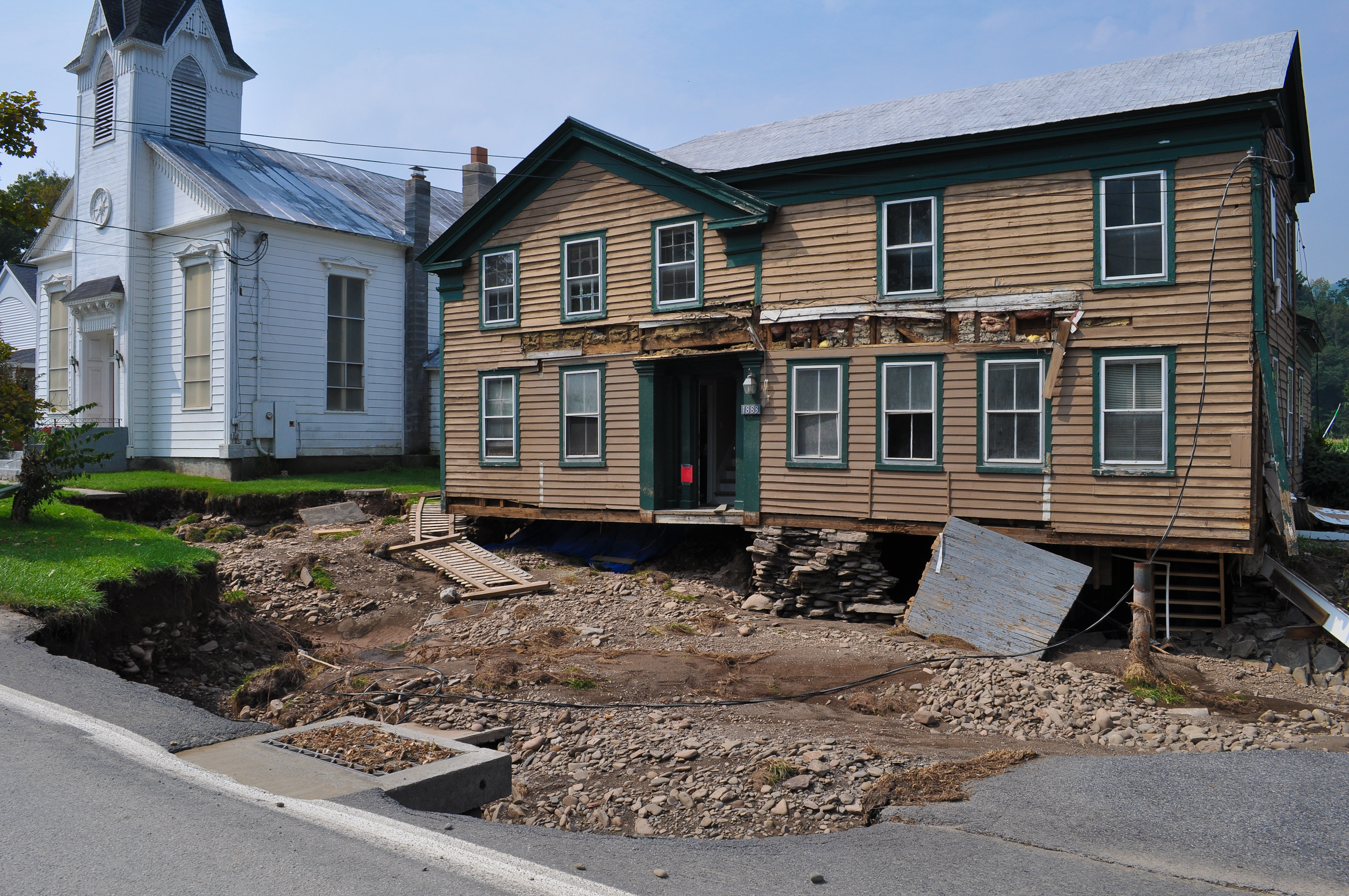
- Damaged home in Blenheim after Hurricane Irene

- Location in Schoharie County and the state of New York.
- Coordinates: 42°29′11″N 74°29′56″W
- Country: United States
- State: New York
- County: Schoharie

Area
  - Total: 34.39 sq mi (89.06 km^{2})
  - Land: 33.93 sq mi (87.87 km^{2})
  - Water: 0.46 sq mi (1.19 km^{2})
- Elevation: 1,545 ft (471 m)

Population (2020)
  - Total: 308
  - Density: 9.08/sq mi (3.51/km^{2})
- Time zone: UTC-5 (Eastern (EST))
  - Summer (DST): UTC-4 (EDT)
- FIPS code: 36-06893
- GNIS feature ID: 0978738

Blenheim is a town in the southwestern part of Schoharie County, New York, United States. It is located east of Oneonta. At the 2020 census, the population was 308. The town was named after a land patent, which itself was named after the Battle of Blenheim.

== History ==
The town was the site of raids and skirmishes during the American Revolution.

The town was one of the original six towns of the county, created in 1797 from Schoharie. In 1803, part of Blenheim was used to create the Town of Jefferson. Another part of Blenheim was taken in 1848 to form part of the new Town of Gilboa.

The town had one of the world's longest wooden single-span covered bridges (at 232 feet), the Old Blenheim Bridge. It was built in 1855 and existed until 2011, when it was destroyed by flooding caused by Tropical Storm Irene.

The Lansing Manor House and North Blenheim Historic District are listed on the National Register of Historic Places.

== Notable people ==
- Julia E. B. Brick, philanthropist
- John A. King, former governor of New York
- Alonzo A. Loper, Wisconsin state legislator
- Stephen L. Mayham, U.S. Congressman
- E. Woolsey Peck, Chief Justice of the Alabama Supreme Court

== Geography ==
According to the United States Census Bureau, the town has a total area of 34.4 square miles (89 km^{2}), of which 33.9 square miles (88 km^{2}) is land and 0.4 square miles (1.0 km^{2}) (1.25%) is water.

The Schoharie Creek flows through the town.

New York State Route 30 is a north-south highway in the eastern part of Blenheim.

== Climate ==
According to the Köppen Climate Classification system, Blenheim has a warm-summer humid continental climate, abbreviated "Dfb" on climate maps. The hottest temperature recorded in Blenheim was 98 °F (36.7 °C) on August 10, 2001, while the coldest temperature recorded was −26 °F (−32.2 °C) on January 27, 1994.

Climate data for Lansing Manor, New York, 1991–2020 normals, extremes 1985–present
Month	Jan	Feb	Mar	Apr	May	Jun	Jul	Aug	Sep	Oct	Nov	Dec	Year
Record high °F (°C)	68 (20)	75 (24)	85 (29)	93 (34)	94 (34)	97 (36)	97 (36)	98 (37)	95 (35)	87 (31)	80 (27)	72 (22)	98 (37)
Mean maximum °F (°C)	58.3 (14.6)	57.6 (14.2)	65.0 (18.3)	80.5 (26.9)	87.3 (30.7)	90.7 (32.6)	91.9 (33.3)	90.5 (32.5)	88.1 (31.2)	79.6 (26.4)	70.1 (21.2)	58.7 (14.8)	93.6 (34.2)
Mean daily maximum °F (°C)	33.0 (0.6)	35.2 (1.8)	42.9 (6.1)	56.0 (13.3)	68.3 (20.2)	76.6 (24.8)	81.3 (27.4)	79.7 (26.5)	73.0 (22.8)	60.7 (15.9)	49.1 (9.5)	38.5 (3.6)	57.9 (14.4)
Daily mean °F (°C)	21.8 (−5.7)	23.7 (−4.6)	31.3 (−0.4)	43.4 (6.3)	55.2 (12.9)	63.8 (17.7)	68.6 (20.3)	67.1 (19.5)	60.2 (15.7)	48.4 (9.1)	38.2 (3.4)	28.5 (−1.9)	45.8 (7.7)
Mean daily minimum °F (°C)	10.7 (−11.8)	12.3 (−10.9)	19.8 (−6.8)	30.7 (−0.7)	42.1 (5.6)	51.0 (10.6)	55.8 (13.2)	54.5 (12.5)	47.4 (8.6)	36.2 (2.3)	27.2 (−2.7)	18.5 (−7.5)	33.8 (1.0)
Mean minimum °F (°C)	−8.0 (−22.2)	−6.4 (−21.3)	1.4 (−17.0)	18.3 (−7.6)	28.3 (−2.1)	37.8 (3.2)	45.2 (7.3)	43.4 (6.3)	34.1 (1.2)	24.0 (−4.4)	12.3 (−10.9)	2.4 (−16.4)	−12.6 (−24.8)
Record low °F (°C)	−26 (−32)	−21 (−29)	−11 (−24)	5 (−15)	18 (−8)	31 (−1)	39 (4)	37 (3)	25 (−4)	17 (−8)	0 (−18)	−12 (−24)	−26 (−32)
Average precipitation inches (mm)	2.79 (71)	2.37 (60)	3.28 (83)	3.79 (96)	3.64 (92)	4.69 (119)	4.80 (122)	4.35 (110)	4.07 (103)	4.46 (113)	3.14 (80)	3.37 (86)	44.75 (1,135)
Source 1: NOAA
Source 2: National Weather Service

== Demographics ==
Historical population
Census	Pop.	Note	%±
1820	1,826		—
1830	2,280		24.9%
1840	2,725		19.5%
1850	1,314		−51.8%
1860	1,367		4.0%
1870	1,437		5.1%
1880	1,191		−17.1%
1890	951		−20.2%
1900	768		−19.2%
1910	616		−19.8%
1920	516		−16.2%
1930	397		−23.1%
1940	415		4.5%
1950	378		−8.9%
1960	345		−8.7%
1970	260		−24.6%
1980	292		12.3%
1990	332		13.7%
2000	330		−0.6%
2010	377		14.2%
2020	308		−18.3%
U.S. Decennial Census

At the 2020 census, there were 308 people living in 151 households in Blenheim, with an average age of 45.4 years. 28.1% of the population has Irish ancestry and 24.0% has German ancestry. The median household income is $57,361, while 16.1% of the population lives in poverty. Veterans (96% of whom are male) make up 8.2% of the population.

As of the census of 2000, there were 330 people, 150 households, and 97 families residing in the town. The population density was 9.7 inhabitants per square mile (3.7/km^{2}). There were 303 housing units at an average density of 8.9 per square mile (3.4/km^{2}). The racial makeup of the town was 96.97% White, 1.52% African American, 0.30% from other races, and 1.21% from two or more races. Hispanic or Latino of any race were 2.12% of the population.

There were 150 households, out of which 24.7% had children under the age of 18 living with them, 50.7% were married couples living together, 7.3% had a female householder with no husband present, and 34.7% were non-families. 28.7% of all households were made up of individuals, and 18.0% had someone living alone who was 65 years of age or older. The average household size was 2.20 and the average family size was 2.64.

In the town, the population was spread out, with 18.8% under the age of 18, 4.2% from 18 to 24, 24.2% from 25 to 44, 33.3% from 45 to 64, and 19.4% who were 65 years of age or older. The median age was 48 years. For every 100 females, there were 100.0 males. For every 100 females age 18 and over, there were 94.2 males.

The median income for a household in the town was $38,500, and the median income for a family was $44,821. Males had a median income of $32,321 versus $24,167 for females. The per capita income for the town was $20,993. About 5.9% of families and 8.5% of the population were below the poverty line, including 3.8% of those under age 18 and 14.5% of those age 65 or over.

== Communities and locations in Blenheim ==
- Cole Hollow – A valley near the northern town line.
- Eminence – A hamlet on the northwestern town line.
- Mine Kill State Park – A state park in the southeastern part of the town.
- North Blenheim – A hamlet in the eastern part of the town on NY-30.
- Ruth – A hamlet in the southwestern part of the town on County Road 12.

== Politics ==
The elected town supervisor of Blenheim is Don Airey.
