= Frederick R. Clark Energy Center =

- Country: United States
- Location: Glass Factory Road, Marcy, New York
- Coordinates: 43.177470°N 75.225043°W
- Status: Operational
- Commission date: June 1980
- Owner: New York Power Authority
- Operator: New York Power Authority

The Frederick R. Clark Energy Center (also known simply as the Clark Energy Center) is a major electric power transmission facility located within the Town of Marcy, in Oneida County, New York, United States. It is owned and operated by the New York Power Authority (NYPA) and serves as the central transmission hub for New York state's electric transmission grid.

== Description ==
Located on Glass Factory Road in Marcy, near the geographic center of New York state, the Frederick R. Clark Energy Center serves as the central transmission and coordination hub for the New York Power Authority's statewide transmission grid.

The Clark Energy Center opened in June 1980. It is the location where NYPA's system operations are coordinated.

In 2005, the Clark Energy Center celebrated its 25th anniversary.

== Marcy Substation ==
The Marcy Substation is a major electrical substation located at the Frederick R. Clark Energy Center in Marcy, Oneida County, New York, United States. It is owned by the New York Power Authority (NYPA) as part of its Clark Energy Center complex.

Located near the middle of New York state geographically, the Marcy Substation serves as one of the central transmission substations for the New York Power Authority's statewide power grid. It plays a critical role in the transfer of electricity from Upstate New York and Canada to New York City and Long Island to the south.

The Marcy Substation serves as the southern terminal of the 765-kV Châteauguay–Marcy Interconnection transmission line that links the New York grid with Hydro-Québec's electricity transmission system in the Canadian province of Quebec. The voltage is stepped down at this location to 345 kV, and subsequently is transferred to the several 345-kV NYPA transmission lines that radiate out across New York state.

In the early 2000s, NYPA upgraded the Marcy Substation's infrastructure to eliminate a bottleneck, by installing a convertible static compensator (CSC). The substation was also updated about this same time – in 2002 – with new silicon components, boosting the capacity of wires at the facility by 240 MW.

In 2023, a new transmission line linking Marcy to the New Scotland Substation – another critical NYPA substation – within the Town of New Scotland in the Capital District was completed, as part of NYPA's Marcy to New Scotland Upgrade Project; this new line is known as the East Energy Connect Transmission Line.

== See also ==
- Quebec – New England Transmission
- Stewart Avenue–Uniondale Hub Substation
