= Riverview Covered Bridge =

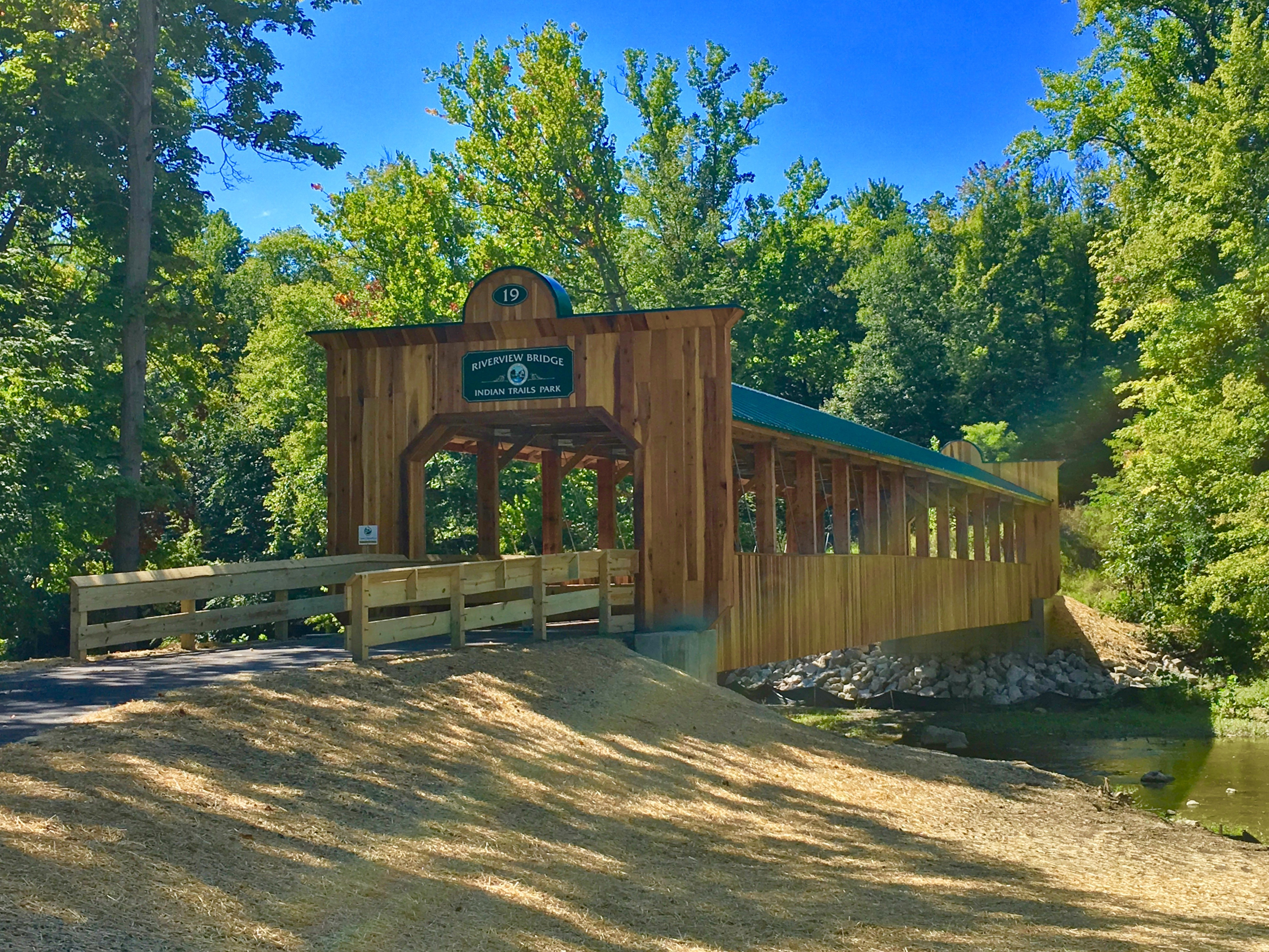
- Coordinates: 41.8554390°N 80.7621500°W
- Carries: pedestrians
- Crosses: Ashtabula River
- Locale: Ashtabula Township, Ohio

Characteristics
- Design: Pratt truss
- Material: Wood
- Total length: 150 feet (46 m)
- Width: 14 feet (4.3 m)

History
- Constructed by: Smolen Engineering
- Construction start: 2015
- Construction end: 2016
- Construction cost: $850,000 (equivalent to $1.14 million in 2025)
- Opened: October 4, 2016

Location
- Interactive map of Riverview Covered Bridge

The Riverview Covered Pedestrian Bridge is a wooden Pratt truss covered bridge in Ashtabula Township, Ohio, United States. It was built beneath the Smolen-Gulf Bridge and completed in 2016. The new pedestrian covered bridge is 150 feet (46 m) long and 14 feet (4.3 m) wide. It is a Pratt truss design, like the Smolen-Gulf Bridge, and was designed by Smolen Engineering. It sits below Smolen Bridge in Indian Trails Park. It was dedicated on October 4, 2016.

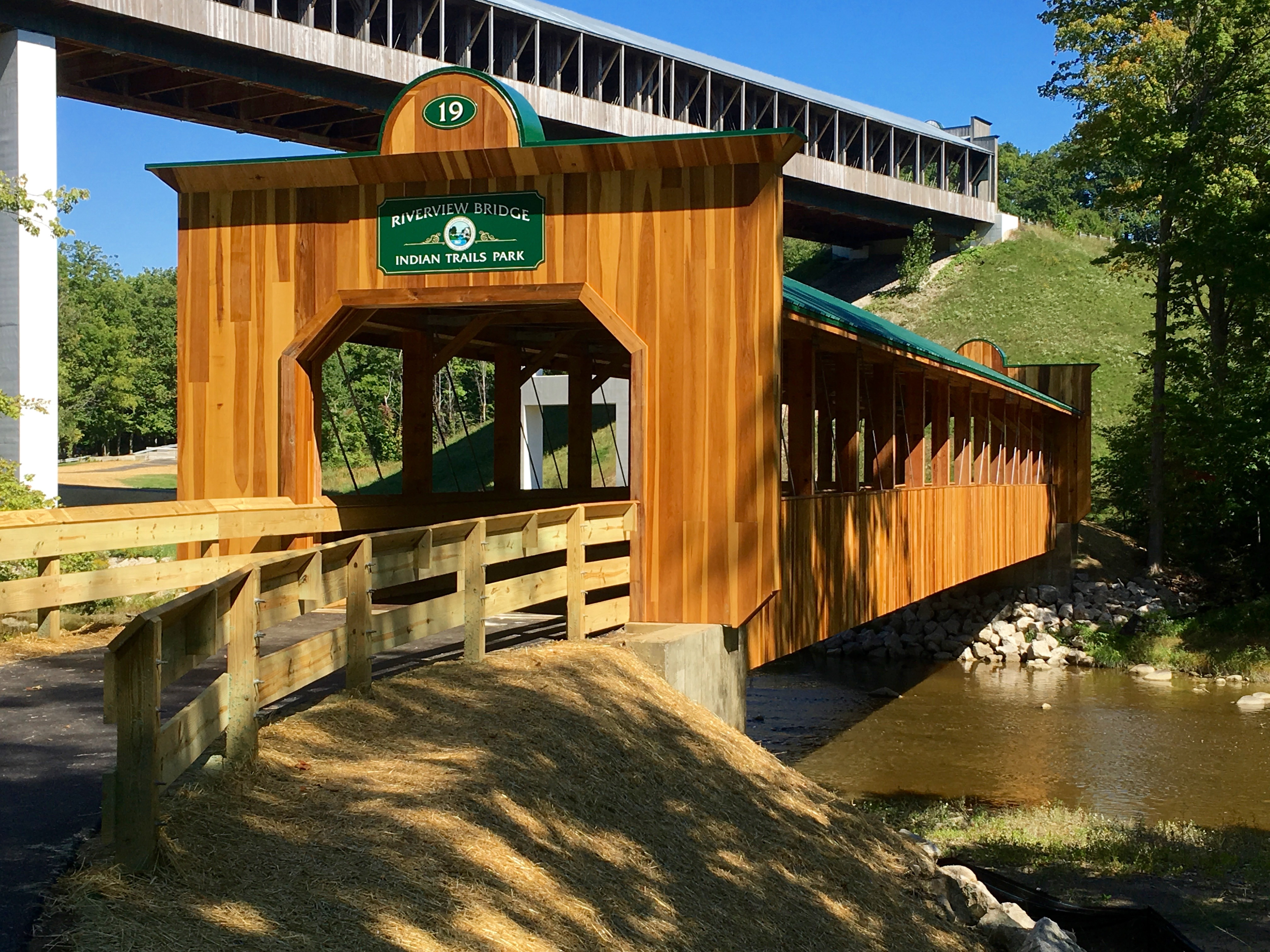
Riverview Covered Bridge with Smolen-Gulf Bridge above it

== Gallery ==
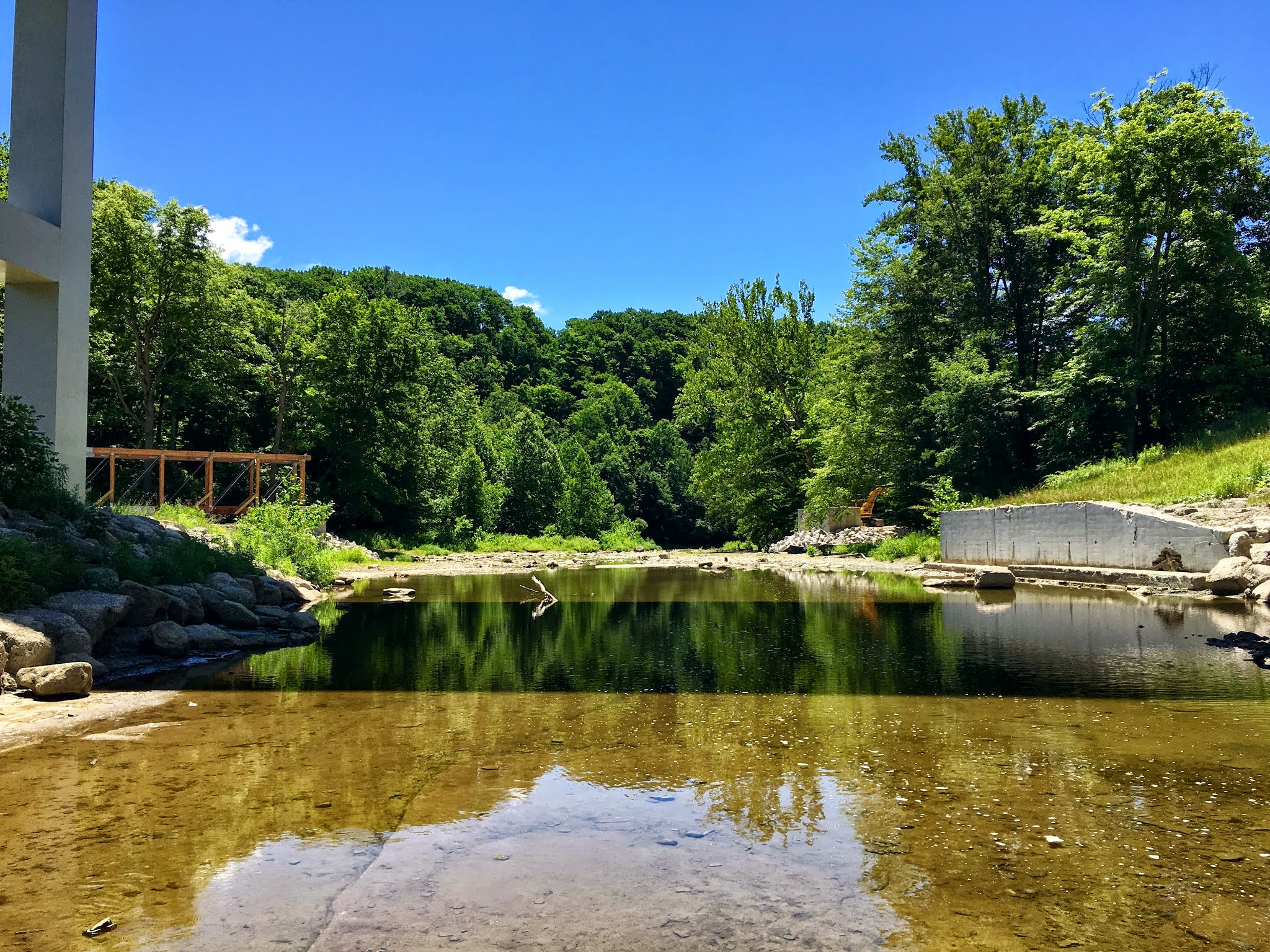

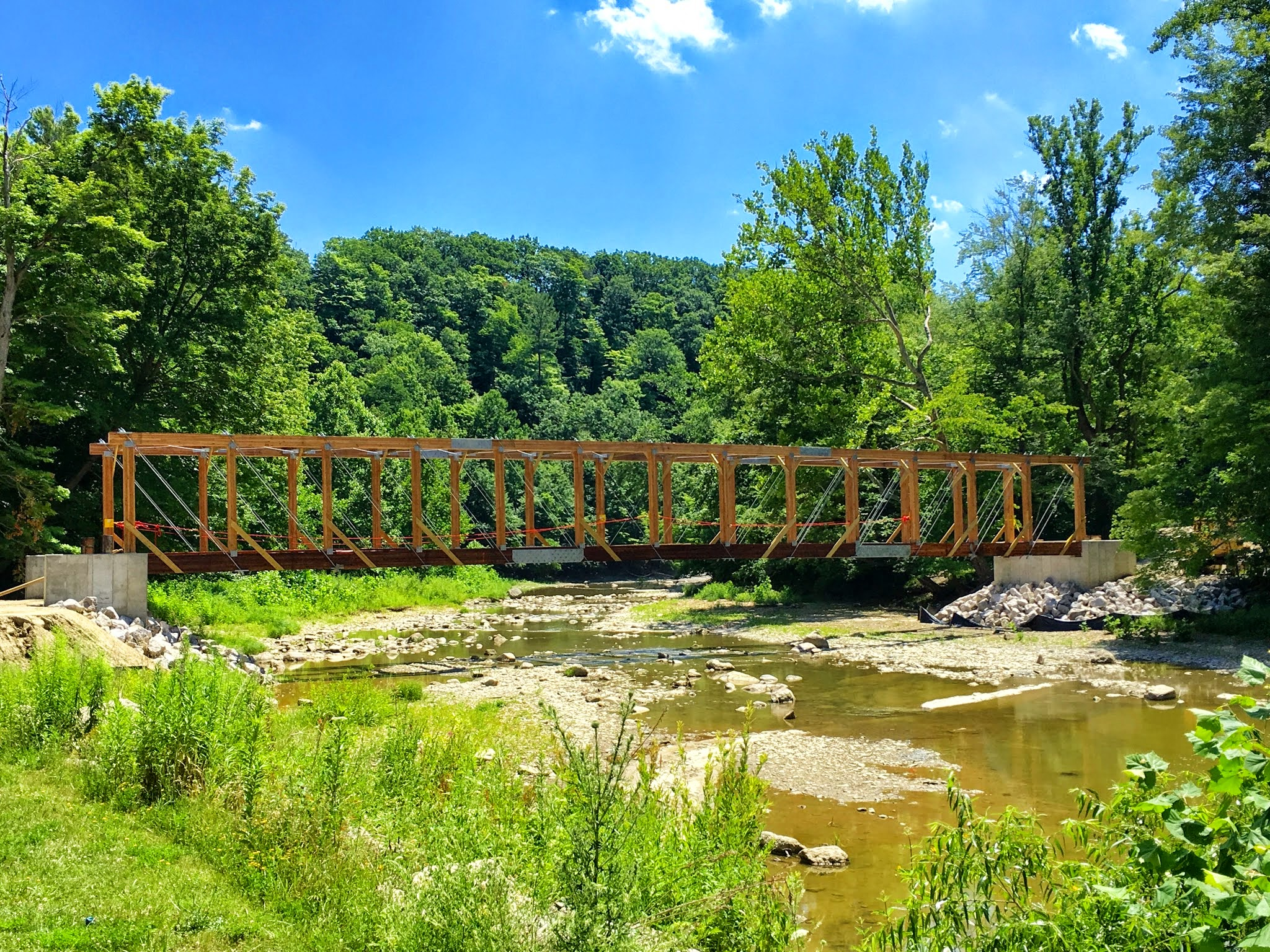

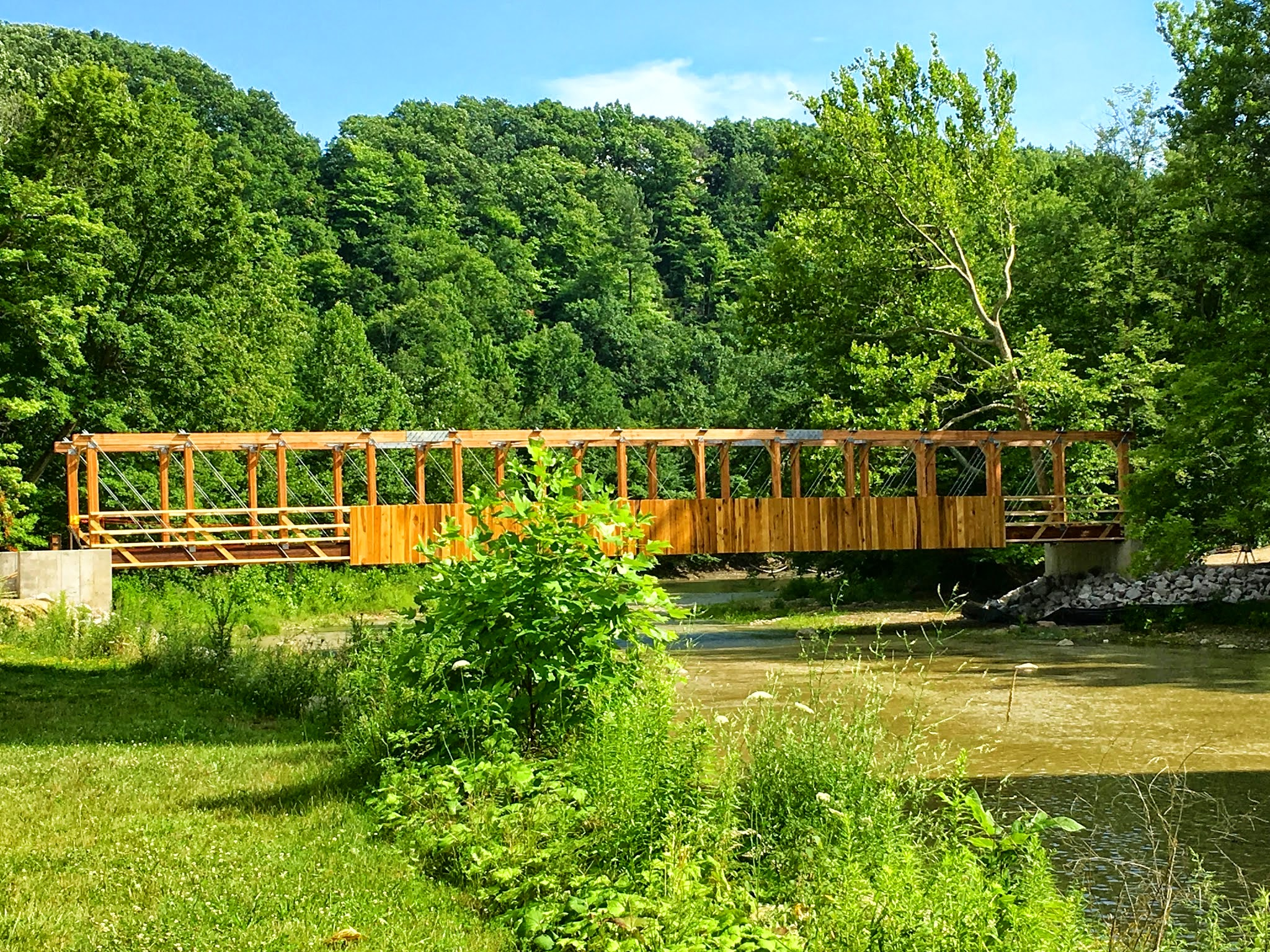

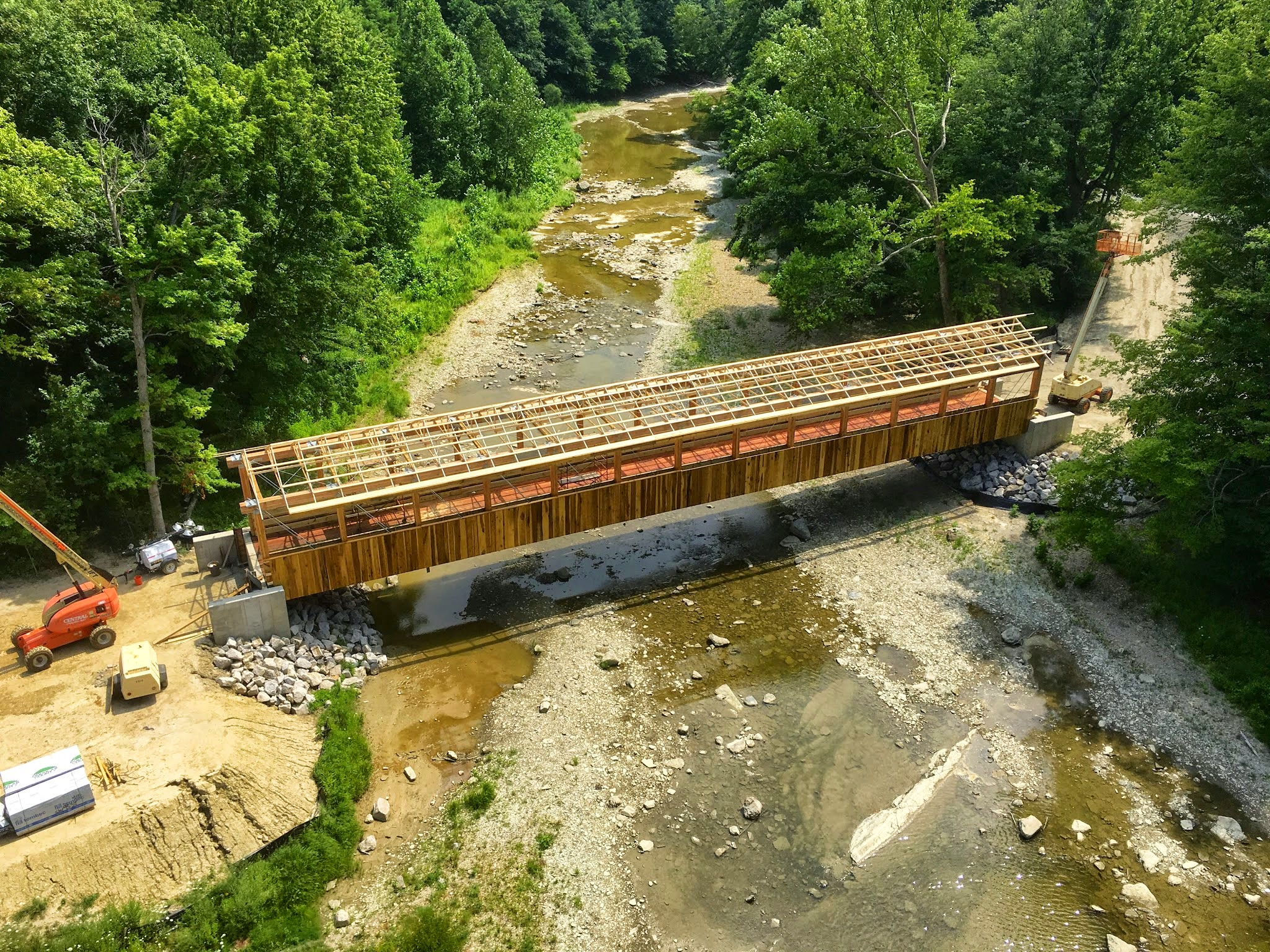

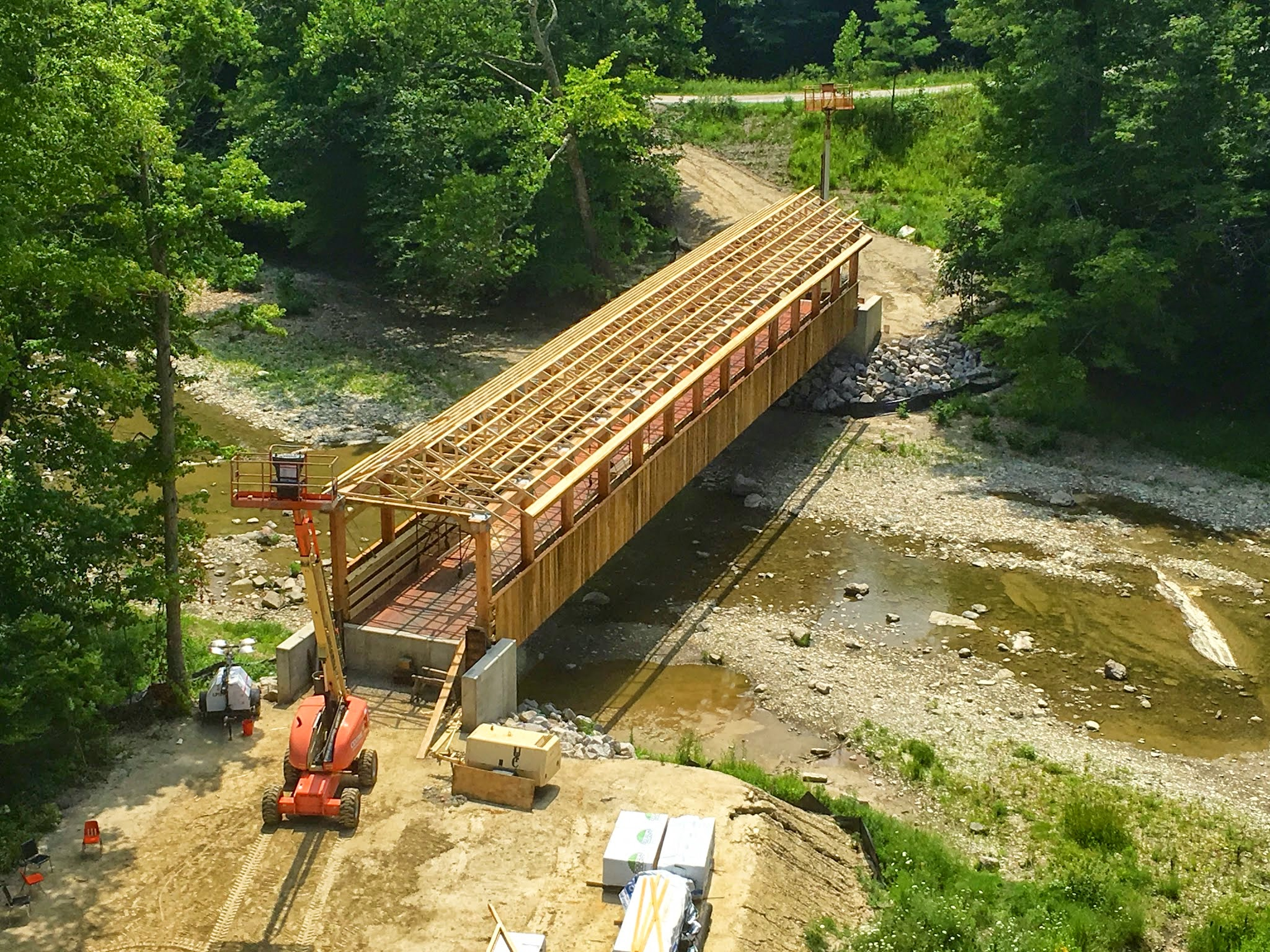

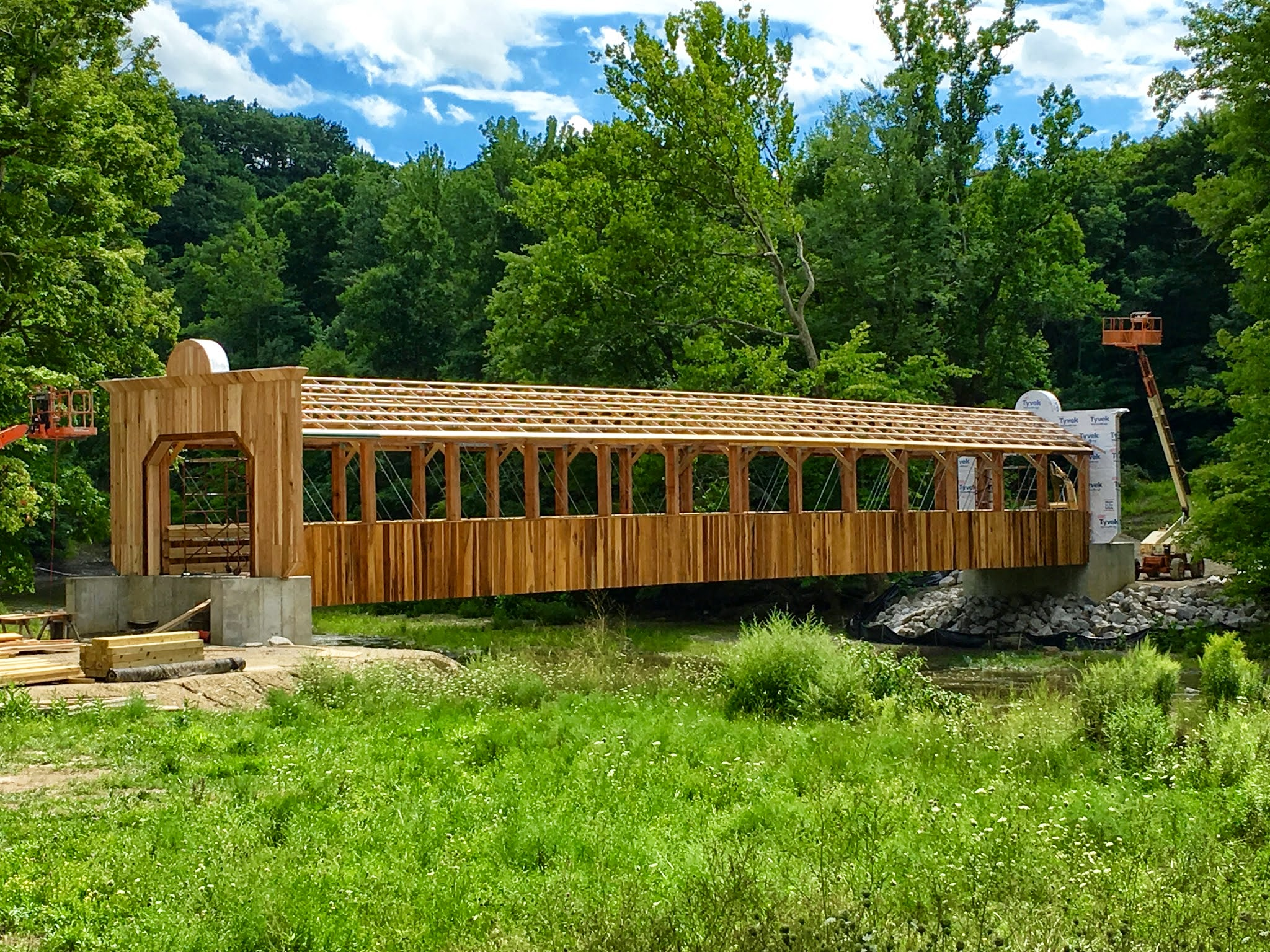

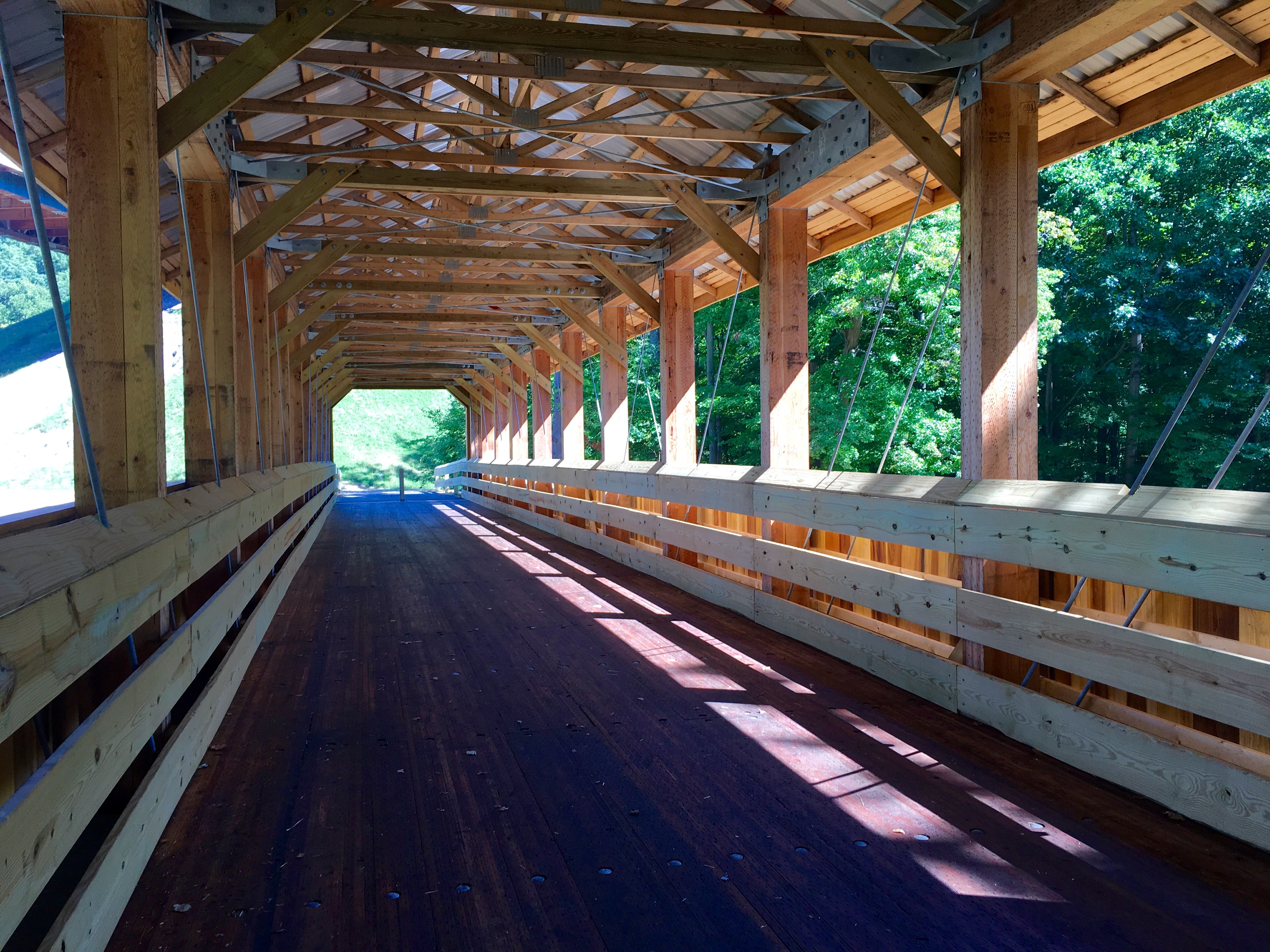
Interior view

== See also ==
- List of covered bridges in Ashtabula County, Ohio
