= Smolen–Gulf Bridge =

Covered bridge in Ohio, United States

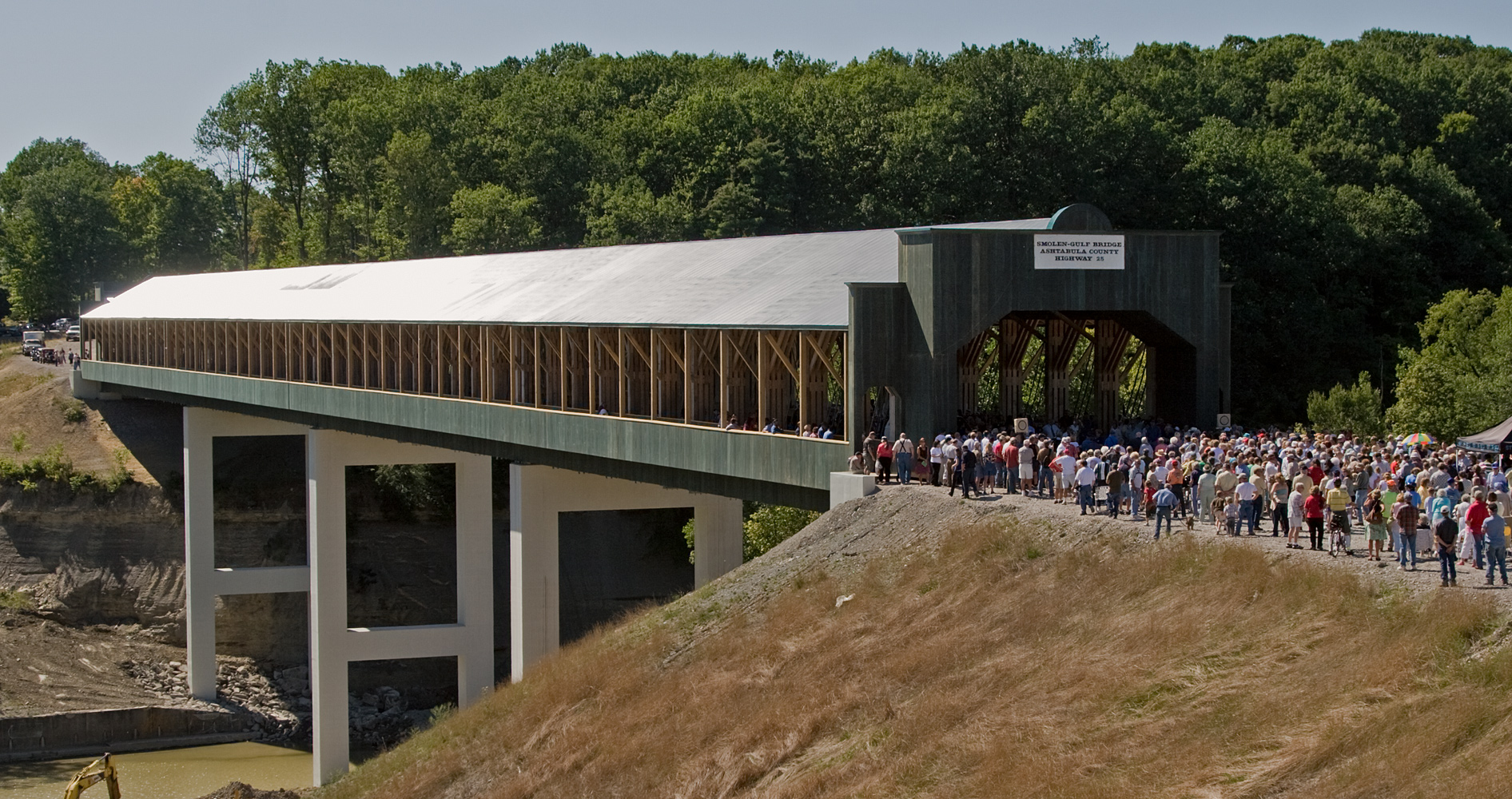
- The opening ceremony of the Smolen-Gulf bridge in August 2008
- Coordinates: 41°51′20″N 80°45′43″W
- Crosses: Ashtabula River
- Locale: Ashtabula County, Ohio
- Official name: Smolen–Gulf Bridge
- Maintained by: Ashtabula County Engineer
- ID number: 35-04-64 (WGCB); 0431524 (NBI)

Characteristics
- Design: modified Pratt truss
- Material: Glue-laminated Southern yellow pine
- Total length: 613 feet (187 m)
- Width: 51 feet (16 m) (overall); 30 feet (9.1 m) (roadway)
- Height: 37 feet (11 m)
- Longest span: 4 x 150 feet (46 m)
- Load limit: HS 25-44 Ohio Legal
- Clearance above: 14.5 feet (4.4 m)
- Clearance below: 93 feet (28 m)

History
- Designer: John Smolen
- Construction start: August 8, 2006; 20 years ago
- Construction end: August 26, 2008; 18 years ago
- Opened: October 7, 2008; 17 years ago
- Replaces: 0430714

Statistics
- Daily traffic: 2065 (previous bridge)

Location
- Interactive map of Smolen–Gulf Bridge

The Smolen–Gulf Bridge is a covered bridge which carries State Road (Ashtabula County Road 25) across the Ashtabula River at the Plymouth and Ashtabula Township line in northern Ashtabula County, Ohio, United States. At 613 feet (187 m), it is the longest covered bridge in the United States – a title formerly held by the Cornish–Windsor Covered Bridge in New Hampshire and Vermont – and the fourth longest covered bridge in the world. The bridge, one of 17 drivable covered bridges in the county, was designed by John Smolen, former Ashtabula County Engineer when the idea of bridging the Ashtabula River Gulf with a wooden structure was first conceived in 1995.

== History ==
The county's 17th publicly accessible covered bridge cost approximately $7.78 million to build, equivalent to $11.6 million in 2025, and features walkways along both sides. It is constructed of four 152 feet (46 m) sections that rest on concrete abutments and three concrete piers, and rises more than 93 feet (28 m) over the river, carrying two lanes of legal-weight traffic. The bridge consists of 3-foot-thick (0.91 m) pieces of Douglas fir or yellow pine, with hemlock or yellow poplar being used for the siding. The builder was Union Industrial Contractors and Koski Construction.

The bridge is located 1.6 miles (2.6 km) east-southeast of Ashtabula, at the same location as the previous bridge which carried State Road across the Ashtabula River. The old bridge, a steel bridge built in 1949 (National Bridge Inventory number 0430714), replaced the Crooked Gulf covered bridge (number 35-04-01) built in 1867.

The bridge was dedicated the afternoon August 26, 2008, where the name was unveiled. (The county already has a State Road Covered Bridge located along a different "State Road" (C-354) over Conneaut Creek in Monroe Township, which is the reason for the name chosen for this bridge.) The bridge was opened to traffic, following the construction of connections to the existing State Road, the evening of October 7, 2008.

A visitors' pavilion was added to the site in 2010. The smaller Riverview Covered Pedestrian Bridge opened below the Smolen–Gulf Bridge in 2016.

== Gallery ==
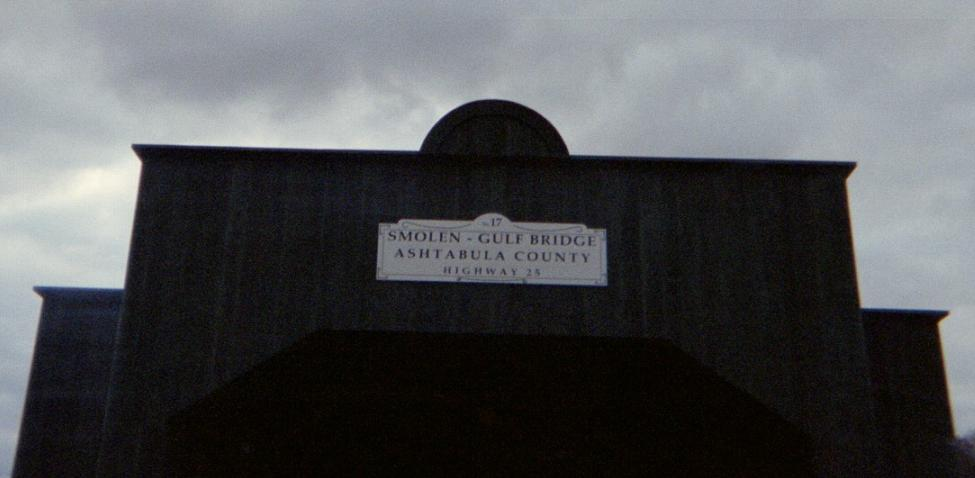
Sign

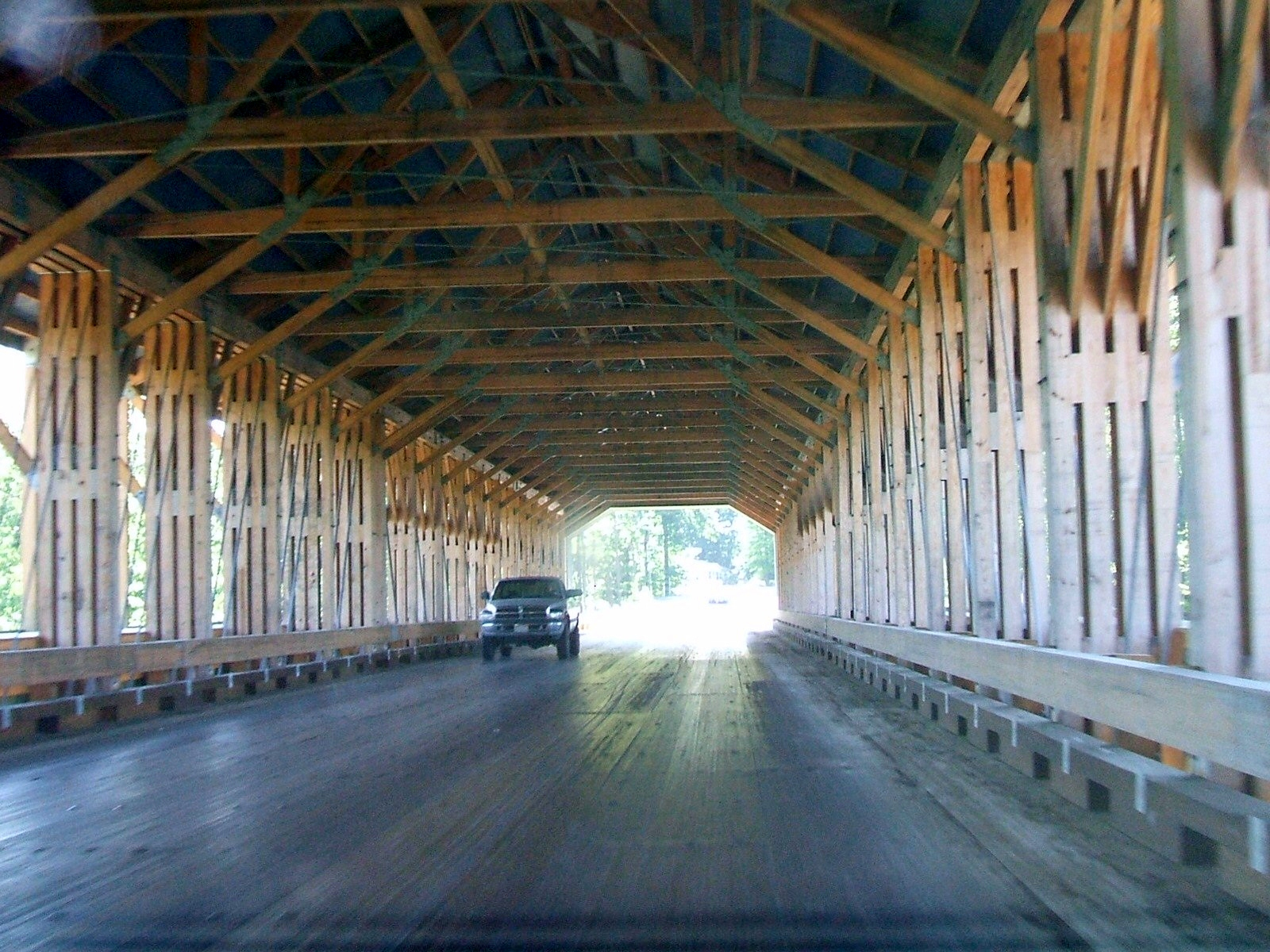
Interior view

== See also ==
- List of covered bridges in Ashtabula County, Ohio
  - West Liberty Covered Bridge in nearby Geneva, shortest drivable covered bridge in the United States
