= New York Power Authority =

Public power utility in New York State

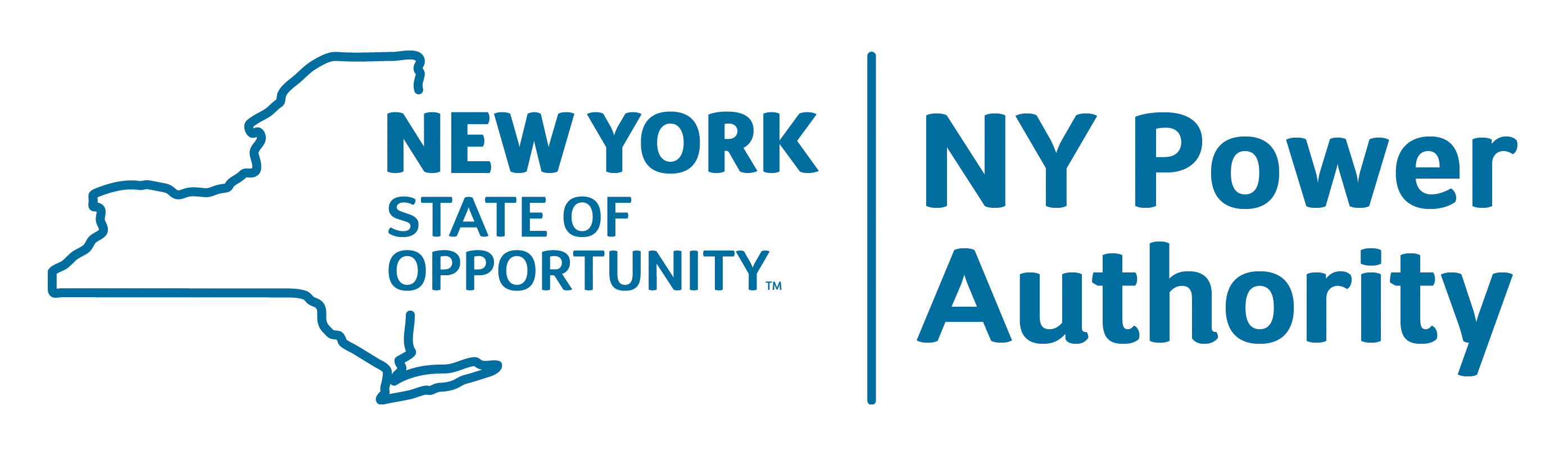
- Type: New York state authority
- Industry: Power generation
- Founded: 1931; 95 years ago
- Founder: Franklin D. Roosevelt
- Headquarters: White Plains, United States
- Key people: Justin Driscoll – President and CEO
- Products: Electricity generation
- Owner: State of New York
- Website: nypa.gov

The New York Power Authority (NYPA) is a public benefit corporation owned by the State of New York and is the largest state public power utility in the United States. It operates 17 generating facilities and more than 1,550 circuit-miles of transmission lines; 80% of the distributed power is renewable clean energy from hydroelectric sources. Its main administrative offices are in White Plains, New York.

NYPA uses no state tax dollars and incurs no state debt, financing its projects principally through the sale of bonds. The bonds are repaid and the projects operated using revenues from operations.

State and federal regulations determine NYPA’s customer base, which includes large and small businesses, not-for-profit organizations, public power systems and government agencies. NYPA also sells electricity to private utilities for resale (without profit) to their customers, and to neighboring states, under federal requirements.

The New York Power Authority has been financially responsible for the New York State Canal Corporation since April 2016 and has owned it since January 1, 2017. Conflicts of interest and lax accounting were an issue in 2009 and 2010 under former CEO Richard Kessel. Investigations into bid rigging and fraud among suppliers lead to convictions for tax fraud in 2016. Development of new power generation has lagged. New York Governor Kathy Hochul has pushed it to get into the construction and management of renewable, clean energy power generation projects.

Justin Driscoll has been the president and CEO since July 2023 and was previously acting president and CEO.

== Organization ==
The New York Power Authority (NYPA) is a New York State public-benefit corporation, governed by a seven‑member board of trustees with a CEO-led management team. The Board of Trustees is appointed by the governor of New York with the advice and consent of the State Senate.

Trustees serve five‑year terms and typically sit on standing committees, including Audit, Governance, Finance, and Risk and Resiliency. Each committee comprises at least three independent board members with relevant expertise.

As of 2026, the Board of Trustees consists of the following members:

- John R. Koelmel (Chair)
- Michael J. Cusick
- Bethaida González
- Cecily L. Morris
- Dennis G. Trainor
- Lewis M. Warren, Jr.
- Laurie Wheelock

NYPA also interacts with specialized allocation or advisory boards such as the Northern New York Power Proceeds Allocation Board, whose members are appointed under separate statutory criteria but tied to NYPA power proceeds, which are funds generated from the sale of unused hydropower from NYPA's Niagara and St. Lawrence-Franklin D. Roosevelt power projects.

Day‑to‑day operations are run by a president and chief executive officer who reports to the board. As of 2026, Justin E. Driscoll is president and CEO.

The New York Power Authority also oversees specialized subsidiaries. NYPA owns the New York State Canal Corporation, a separate public-benefit corporation responsible for operating and maintaining the state’s canal system. NYPA became financially responsible in 2016 and the owner as of January 1, 2017. Another subsidiary, the New York Renewable Energy Development Holdings Corporation, was established following the approval of the 2023-24 New York enacted state budget to develop, construct, and operate new renewable energy projects.

== Operations ==
The New York Power Authority owns and operates hydroelectric, pumped-storage hydroelectric, and open and combined cycle gas turbine power plants, as well as battery electric storage facilities. The NYPA has committed to retiring all fossil fuel units by 2035. Following state law, NYPA must retire all gas-fired peaking power plants by 2035 unless they must be kept for reliability.

In the 2024 fiscal year state budget the NYPA was directed to develop utility-scale renewable energy generating facilities. In 2025, Gov. Hochul asked NYPA to develop a new nuclear project that would deliver at least 1 gigawatt of advanced nuclear generation.

Power produced by NYPA is sold to municipal utilities, large and small businesses, not-for-profit organizations, government agencies, private utilities for resale without profit to their customers, and utilities in neighboring states under federal requirements. Power is also sold into the wholesale electricity market of New York State, which is administered by the New York Independent System Operator. Among NYPA's largest direct sales customers are the Metropolitan Transportation Authority, the City of New York, and the Port Authority of New York & New Jersey.

== Facilities ==
=== Power Generation Facilities ===
Name	Type	Capacity (MWe)	Location	Year of commission
Niagara Power Project – Lewiston Pumped Storage	Pumped Storage Hydro	240	Lewiston	1961
Niagara Power Project – Moses Niagara Power Dam	Hydro	2860	Lewiston	1961
St. Lawrence-Franklin D. Roosevelt Power Project	Hydro	1088	Massena	1958
Blenhein-Gilboa Pumped Storage Power Project	Pumped Storage Hydro	1160	Gilboa	1973
Ashokan Project	Hydro	4.6	Shokan	1982
Cresecent Plant	Hydro	11.6	Crescent	1991
Gregory B. Jarvis Plant	Hydro	9	Hinckley	1994
Vischer Ferry Plant	Hydro	11.6	Vischer Ferry	1991
Grahamsville	Hydro	18	Grahmsville	1956
Neversink	Hydro	25	Grahmsville	1953
North Country ESR	Battery Storage	20	Chateaugay	2023
Gowanus 5&6 (Note: Planned for closure by 2030 provided certain environmental and grid reliability criteria are fulfilled. Following closure, the NYPA may develop a battery storage facility at this location.)	Gas Turbine	94	Brooklyn	2001
Kent	Gas Turbine	47	Brooklyn	2001
Pouch	Gas Turbine	47	Staten Island	2001
Hellgate	Gas Turbine	94	Bronx	2001
Harlem River	Gas Turbine	94	Bronx	2001
Vernon Boulevard	Gas Turbine	94	Queens	2001
Brentwood	Gas Turbine	47	Brentwood	2001
Astoria Combined Cycle	CCGT	576	Queens	2006
Astoria Energy II (Note: Owned by Astoria Energy II LLC; the NYPA contracts for 100% of its output.)	CCGT	660	Queens	2011
Richard M. Flynn	CCGT	170	Holtsville	1994
Greenport	Fuel Oil Internal Combustion	6.8	Greenport	1957

Plants under development
Name	Type	Capacity (MWe)	Location
Somers Solar	Solar PV	20	Fort Edward
North Albany Landfill	Solar PV	1.5	Albany
Planned nuclear power plant	Nuclear	1000+	Upstate New York

NYPA Gas Power Plants

=== Electric transmission lines ===
The hub of NYPA’s statewide power transmission facilities is the Frederick R. Clark Energy Center, in Marcy, New York. NYPA owns and operates approximately 1,550 circuit miles of high-voltage transmission lines, including a 765-kilovolt (kV) line that stretches more than 100 miles from the Canada–United States border to the Clark Energy Center and almost 1,000 miles of 345-kV power lines that crisscross New York State, including the Marcy South line and a 26.3 mi (42.3 km) transmission project that follows an underground and underwater path from Westchester County to Long Island.

In 2026, NYPA completed the Smart Path Connect project, which involved rebuilding 100 miles of transmission lines and adding new substations. The improvements enabled the flow of more renewable energy across New York State.

=== New York State Canal Corporation ===
The New York Power Authority has been financially responsible for the New York State Canal Corporation since April 2016 and has owned it since January 1, 2017.

== History ==
Then-Governor Franklin D. Roosevelt signed the Power Authority Act into law on April 27, 1931 that established the Power Authority of the State of New York (PASNY); the name was later changed to New York Power Authority (NYPA). Leland Olds headed the authority from 1931 to 1939.

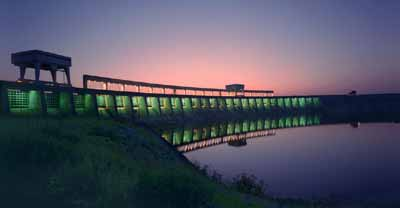
St. Lawrence Power Project

St. Lawrence-Franklin D. Roosevelt Power Project

The International Joint Commission granted its approval for a cross-border construction project in 1952. In 1953, the Federal Power Commission issued a license for NYPA to develop the U.S. portion of a power dam crossing the Canada–US border. On May 13, 1954, President Dwight D. Eisenhower signed legislation that cleared the way for construction of both a hydroelectric facility and the St. Lawrence Seaway. First power was achieved in July 1958, and on June 27, 1959, Queen Elizabeth II and Vice President Richard M. Nixon formally dedicated the St. Lawrence Project as a symbol of international cooperation. In 1981, NYPA’s half of the cross-border power dam was renamed the St. Lawrence-Franklin D. Roosevelt Power Project in honor of the man who founded the Power Authority half a century earlier.

Niagara Power Project

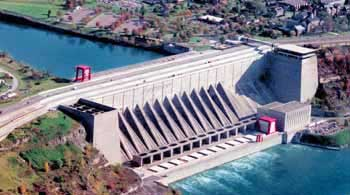
Niagara Power Vista

In 1956, a rockslide destroyed most of the Niagara Mohawk Power Corporation's Schoellkopf hydropower plant, resulting in a power shortage that endangered thousands of local manufacturing jobs. In response to the emergency, Congress passed the Niagara Redevelopment Act in 1957. After obtaining a license from the Federal Power Commission, Robert Moses commenced work on NYPA’s second hydroelectric generating station in early 1958. When it was completed, three years later, the Niagara Power Project was the largest facility of its kind in the Western world. In a recorded message broadcast February 10, 1961, to mark first power, President John F. Kennedy called the Niagara project “an outstanding engineering achievement” and an “example to the world of North American efficiency and determination.”

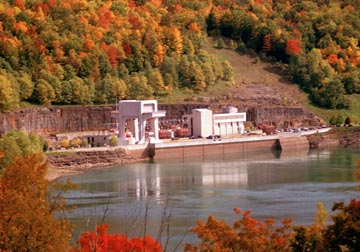
Blenheim-Gilboa Power Project

Blenheim-Gilboa Pumped Storage Power Project
Legislation signed by Governor Nelson A. Rockefeller in 1968 allowed NYPA to expand its generation assets and build nuclear and pumped storage power projects. This led to construction of the Blenheim-Gilboa Pumped Storage Power Project, which produced electricity for the first time in July 1973, and the James A. FitzPatrick Nuclear Power Plant (named after a NYPA chairman), in Scriba, Oswego County, where power was first generated in February 1975.

=== Expanded Authority ===
The NYPA was newly authorized in the 2023-2024 state budget to develop, own, and operate renewable energy facilities which help meet the state's clean energy goals. A 20MW solar installation in Fort Edward and a 1.5MW solar facility in Albany were the first facilities announced under this expanded authority and are currently under development.

=== List of chairs of the New York Power Authority ===
Francis Patrick Walsh, 1931–1939.
James Cummings Bonbright, 1939–1946.
Maj.-Gen. Francis Bowditch Wilby, 1946–1950.
John Edward Burton, 1950–1954.
Robert Moses, 1954–1963.
James A. FitzPatrick, 1963–1977.
Frederick R. Clark, 1977–1979.
John Stuart Dyson, 1979–1985.
Richard M. Flynn, 1985–1994.
Clarence D. Rappleyea Jr., 1995–2001.
Joseph J. Seymour, 2001–2002, 2005–2006
Louis P. Ciminelli, 2002–2006.
Frank S. McCullough Jr., 2006–2008.
Michael J. Townsend, 2008–2012.
John R. Koelmel, 2012.
Gil C. Quiniones, 2012–2021.
Justin Driscoll, 2022–Present.

== See also ==
- Federal Energy Regulatory Commission
- Green Island Power Authority
- Indian Point Energy Center
- James A. FitzPatrick Nuclear Power Plant
- Long Island Power Authority
- New York State Energy Research and Development Authority
- New York State Public Service Commission
- New York State Thruway Authority
- New York energy law
