= North Blenheim, New York =

North Blenheim
- hamlet and CDP
- Location of North Blenheim in New York
- Coordinates: 42°28′15″N 74°26′44″W
- Country: United States
- State: New York
- County: Schoharie
- Town: Blenheim

North Blenheim is a hamlet (and census-designated place) in the town of Blenheim, Schoharie County, New York, United States. As of the 2020 census, North Blenheim had a population of 54. It had the longest wooden, single-span covered bridge in the United States, the Old Blenheim Bridge. It was built in 1855 and remained intact until 2011, when it was destroyed by flooding caused by Hurricane Irene. The "Blenheim Gilboa Power Project Visitors Center" is also located there. The Blenheim covered bridge has been rebuilt and opened in 2019.
