= National Register of Historic Places listings in Meigs County, Tennessee =

Location of Meigs County in Tennessee

This is a list of the National Register of Historic Places listings in Meigs County, Tennessee.

This is intended to be a complete list of the properties and districts on the National Register of Historic Places in Meigs County, Tennessee, United States. Latitude and longitude coordinates are provided for many National Register properties and districts; these locations may be seen together in a map.

There are 37 properties listed on the National Register in the county. Another 5 properties were once listed but have been removed.

Contents: Counties in Tennessee
Anderson – Bedford – Benton – Bledsoe – Blount – Bradley – Campbell – Cannon – Carroll – Carter – Cheatham – Chester – Claiborne – Clay – Cocke – Coffee – Crockett – Cumberland – Davidson – Decatur – DeKalb – Dickson – Dyer – Fayette – Fentress – Franklin – Gibson – Giles – Grainger – Greene – Grundy – Hamblen – Hamilton – Hancock – Hardeman – Hardin – Hawkins – Haywood – Henderson – Henry – Hickman – Houston – Humphreys – Jackson – Jefferson – Johnson – Knox – Lake – Lauderdale – Lawrence – Lewis – Lincoln – Loudon – Macon – Madison – Marion – Marshall – Maury – McMinn – McNairy – Meigs – Monroe – Montgomery – Moore – Morgan – Obion – Overton – Perry – Pickett – Polk – Putnam – Rhea – Roane – Robertson – Rutherford – Scott – Sequatchie – Sevier – Shelby – Smith – Stewart – Sullivan – Sumner – Tipton – Trousdale – Unicoi – Union – Van Buren – Warren – Washington – Wayne – Weakley – White – Williamson – Wilson

This National Park Service list is complete through NPS recent listings posted January 9, 2026.

== Current listings ==
	Name on the Register	Image	Date listed	Location	City or town	Description
1	Big Sewee Creek Bridge		July 6, 1982 (#82003995)	State Route 58 and Center Point Rd. 35°35′37″N 84°42′46″W	Decatur	
2	John M. Black Cabin		July 6, 1982 (#82004016)	Big Sewee Creek Rd. 35°38′52″N 84°37′57″W	Ten Mile	
3	Blythe Ferry	Blythe Ferry	January 5, 1983 (#83003055)	North of Birchwood on State Route 60 at the Tennessee River; 35°24′51″N 85°00′41″W	Birchwood vicinity	Extends into Rhea County
4	James Cowan House		July 6, 1982 (#82003994)	Old Bunker Hill Rd. 35°22′35″N 84°56′01″W	Big Spring	
5	Decatur Methodist Church	Decatur Methodist Church	July 6, 1982 (#82003997)	Vernon St. 35°30′47″N 84°47′30″W	Decatur	
6	S.S. Eaves House		July 6, 1982 (#82003998)	Eaves Ferry Rd. 35°32′45″N 84°48′02″W	Decatur	
7	Ewing House		July 6, 1982 (#82004018)	River Rd. 35°40′03″N 84°43′38″W	Ten Mile	
8	Feezell Barn		July 6, 1982 (#82004019)	State Route 58; 35°38′34″N 84°41′19″W	Ten Mile	
9	Georgetown Road		March 23, 2022 (#100007556)	8100 Block of TN 60; 35°17′56″N 84°57′23″W	Georgetown	
10	James R. Gettys House		July 6, 1982 (#82004020)	N. No Pone Valley Rd. 35°35′29″N 84°40′41″W	Ten Mile	
11	James R. Gettys Mill		July 6, 1982 (#82004021)	N. No Pone Valley Rd. 35°35′31″N 84°40′42″W	Ten Mile	
12	Jim Godsey House		July 6, 1982 (#82003999)	State Route 30; 35°31′30″N 84°51′06″W	Decatur	
13	James Turk Griffith House		July 6, 1982 (#82004022)	State Route 58; 35°38′54″N 84°41′18″W	Ten Mile	
14	Jacob L. Grubb Store	Jacob L. Grubb Store	July 6, 1982 (#82004000)	State Route 58; 35°23′38″N 84°54′02″W	Decatur	Nomination form
15	Hastings-Locke Ferry	Hastings-Locke Ferry	January 5, 1983 (#83003056)	West of Decatur on State Route 30 at the Tennessee River; 35°32′16″N 84°52′41″W	Decatur vicinity	Extends into Rhea County
16	Dr. D.W. Holloway House		July 6, 1982 (#82004023)	River Rd. 35°42′16″N 84°41′36″W	Ten Mile	
17	Scott Hooper Garage		July 6, 1982 (#82004010)	State Route 1; 35°21′21″N 84°54′56″W	Georgetown	
18	Hutsell Truss Bridge		July 6, 1982 (#82004024)	Old Ten Mile Rd. 35°36′49″N 84°41′16″W	Ten Mile	
19	Sam Hutsell House		July 6, 1982 (#82004025)	Old Ten Mile Rd. 35°36′46″N 84°41′15″W	Ten Mile	
20	R.H. Johnson Stable	R.H. Johnson Stable	July 6, 1982 (#82004026)	State Route 58; 35°40′49″N 84°40′09″W	Ten Mile	
21	Kings Mill Bridge	Kings Mill Bridge	July 6, 1982 (#82004001)	Big Sewee Rd. 35°34′40″N 84°45′34″W	Decatur	
22	MacPherson House		July 6, 1982 (#82004027)	Off Hurricane Valley Rd. 35°40′28″N 84°38′33″W	Ten Mile	
23	McKenzie Windmill		July 6, 1982 (#82004011)	State Route 58; 35°21′23″N 84°54′55″W	Georgetown	
24	Meigs County Bank	Meigs County Bank	July 6, 1982 (#82004003)	Court Sq. 35°30′56″N 84°47′23″W	Decatur	Nomination form
25	Meigs County Courthouse	Meigs County Courthouse	August 3, 1978 (#78002613)	Court Sq. 35°30′53″N 84°47′24″W	Decatur	
26	Mount Zion Church		July 6, 1982 (#82004006)	Mt. Zion Hollow; 35°37′28″N 84°38′48″W	Decatur	
27	Oak Grove Methodist Church		July 6, 1982 (#82004028)	Pinhook Ferroy Rd. 35°37′56″N 84°46′12″W	Ten Mile	
28	Alexander Patterson House		July 6, 1982 (#82004029)	Wood Lane; 35°39′11″N 84°40′51″W	Ten Mile	
29	Rice-Marler House		July 6, 1982 (#82004007)	Goodfield Valley Rd. 35°28′42″N 84°50′07″W	Decatur	
30	Bradford Rymer Barn	Bradford Rymer Barn	July 6, 1982 (#82004012)	State Route 1; 35°17′47″N 84°57′11″W	Georgetown	Nomination form
31	Elisha Sharp House		July 6, 1982 (#82004030)	Old Ten Mile Rd. 35°38′34″N 84°40′23″W	Ten Mile	
32	G. W. Shiflett Barn		July 6, 1982 (#82004013)	State Route 1; 35°18′37″N 84°54′53″W	Georgetown	
33	Robert H. Smith Law Office	Robert H. Smith Law Office	July 6, 1982 (#82004008)	State Route 58; 35°30′58″N 84°47′20″W	Decatur	Nomination form
34	John Stewart House		July 6, 1982 (#82004009)	State Route 58; 35°32′58″N 84°46′20″W	Decatur	
35	Surprise Truss Bridge		July 6, 1982 (#82004031)	Sewee Creek Rd. 35°38′51″N 84°37′58″W	Ten Mile	
36	Watts Bar Hydroelectric Project	Watts Bar Hydroelectric Project	August 14, 2017 (#100001474)	6868 State Route 68; 35°37′20″N 84°46′48″W	Spring City	Extends into Rhea County
37	Andy Wood Log House and Willie Wood Blacksmith Shop		July 6, 1982 (#82004015)	State Route 1; 35°21′11″N 84°55′42″W	Georgetown	

== Former listings ==
	Name on the Register	Image	Date listed	Date removed	Location	City or town	Description
1	Buchanan House	Buchanan House	July 6, 1982 (#82003996)	October 17, 2022	Vernon St. 35°30′49″N 84°47′29″W	Decatur	
2	Culvahouse House		July 6, 1982 (#82004017)	July 17, 2013	River Rd. 35°40′36″N 84°43′03″W	Ten Mile	Destroyed by fire in 2009.
3	Locke House		July 6, 1982 (#82004002)	August 15, 1989	Concord Rd.	Decatur	Destroyed by fire in 1982.
4	Meigs County High School Gymnasium		July 6, 1982 (#82004005)	March 21, 2007	Brown Street	Decatur	Demolished in 2006
5	H. C. Shiflett Barn		July 6, 1982 (#82004014)	March 20, 2017	State Route 1; 35°20′40″N 84°55′10″W	Georgetown	

== See also ==
- List of National Historic Landmarks in Tennessee
- National Register of Historic Places listings in Tennessee
