= Champion Bridge Company =

US steel fabrication business

The Champion Bridge Company, formerly known as Champion Iron Bridge and Manufacturing Company, is a steel fabrication business based in Wilmington, Ohio, in the United States. It has been in business since the 1870s, and several of its works are listed on the National Register of Historic Places.

== History ==
=== Early years ===
In the 1850s, Zimri Wall (October 12, 1836-n.a.) began building bridges in Clinton County, Ohio. In 1860, he built a number of timber bridges in Clinton County. He established the Zimri Wall Company, and in 1871, he went into partnership with his brother as the Z. & J. Wall and Company.

The Wall brothers developed a new wrought iron trussed arch bridge which was subsequently patented as the "Champion Wrought Iron Arch Bridge." The patented design reportedly "played a key role in the history of their company." The brothers sought investors to help them exploit their new design. In 1872, they formed the "Champion Iron Bridge and Manufacturing Company" in partnership with Albert Israel Bailey. The company opened a fabrication shop in Hamilton, Ohio, and in 1875 built a larger shop in Wilmington, Ohio. The business was incorporated in 1878, and Zimri Wall left the business in 1880. In 1881, the company changed its name to the Champion Bridge Company in 1881 and began to also manufacture farm implements, iron fences, and some machinery. In 1893, the company moved to its present location on East Sugartree Street in Wilmington. The company was among the first to use and promote steel for the construction of smaller highway bridges.

=== War on the "bridge trust" ===
In 1905 and 1906, a Sandusky County, Ohio, prosecutor pursued legal action, State of Ohio ex rel. Kora F. Brigs vs. Henry Hughes et al., against six Ohio bridge-building companies, including Champion Bridge Company, alleging that they had formed a "bridge trust." The State alleged that the six companies had conspired to increase prices at the expense of taxpayers.

In 1906, Ohio Attorney General Wade H. Ellis filed criminal charges against 15 bridge companies under Ohio's Valentine Antitrust Act. In October 1906, The New York Times reported that Champion and four other companies had surrendered their charters as a result of Ellis's "war on the bridge trust." Despite the action, the convicted companies were able to continue operating in Ohio by reorganizing in other states or making "organizational revisions under Ohio laws."

=== Later years ===
In the 1930s, the company diversified into other areas of structural steel and began supplying steel for building construction.

In 1935, R. J. Miars, who had previously been the company's general manager, acquired the company in partnership with two investors. Miars later bought out his investors, and he conveyed half of the company to his son, Harry S. Miars, in 1952. The current corporation was established in 1956.

A number of its works are listed on the U.S. National Register of Historic Places.

== Works ==
Works include:

=== Kentucky ===
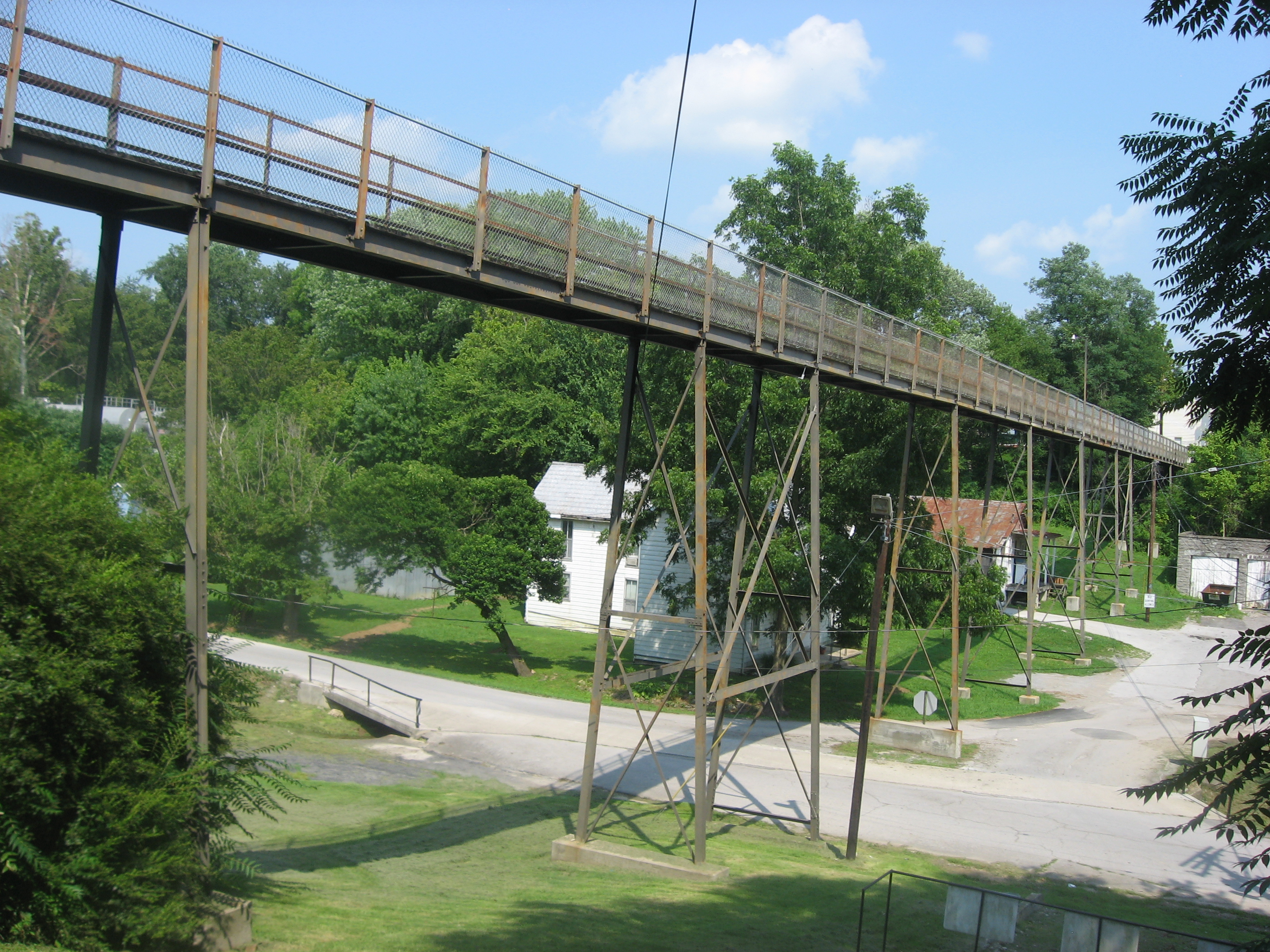
Goose Creek Foot Bridge

- Berry Bridge (1908), spanning Green River on Old Ferry Road, Green County, Kentucky
- Blackford Creek Bridge (circa 1920), spanning Blackford Creek on Toler Bridge Road, Hancock County, Kentucky
- Goose Creek Foot Bridge, Court and Depot Streets, Greensburg, Kentucky (Champion Bridge Co.), NRHP-listed
- Kentucky State Route 1032 Bridge, spanning South Fork of Licking River, Berry, Kentucky
- US 23 Middle Bridge (1908), spanning Levisa Fork, Pikeville, Kentucky

=== North Carolina ===
- North Carolina Road 1336 Bridge (1920), spanning North Toe River, near Burnsville, Mitchell County, North Carolina
- Person County Bridge No. 35, spanning South Flat River on State Road 1120, Hurdle Mills, North Carolina

=== Ohio ===
- Buck Run Bridge (1890), spanning Little West Fork Ohio Brush Creek on Buck Run Road (CR 37), Adams County, Ohio
- Egypt Pike Bridge (1876), spanning Mud Run in New Holland, Pickaway County, Ohio
- Martinsville Road Covered Bridge (1871), spanning the east fork of Todd's Fork one mile west of Martinsville, Ohio, considered the oldest bridge built by Champion Bridge Company

=== Tennessee ===
- Big Sewee Creek Bridge, TN 58 and Center Point Road, Decatur, Tennessee, NRHP-listed
- Hutsell Truss Bridge, Old Ten Mile Road, Ten Mile, Tennessee, NRHP-listed
- Kings Mill Bridge, Big Sewee Road, Decatur, Tennessee, NRHP-listed
- Surprise Truss Bridge, Sewee Creek Road, Ten Mile, Tennessee, NRHP-listed
- Weaver Road Bridge (1898), spanning Paint Rock Creek on Weaver Road near Kingston, Roane County, Tennessee

=== Virginia ===
- Knightly Bridge (1915), spanning the Middle River on Virginia Route 778 near Knightly, Augusta County, Virginia
- Middle River Bridge, on State Route 256 over the Middle River, Weyers Cave, Augusta County, Virginia
- Mount Meridian Bridge (1907), spanning the Middle River at Virginia Route 769, near Mount Meridian, Augusta County, Virginia
- Wallace Mill Bridge (1914), spanning Little Calfpasture River on Virginia State Route 683, near Craigsville in Augusta County, Virginia

=== Other ===
- Bay Springs Bridge (circa 1920), spanning Mackey's Creek, Dennis, Mississippi
- Blackburn Point Bridge (1925), Blackburn Point Road at Gulf Intracoastal Waterway, Osprey, Florida (Champion Bridge Company), NRHP-listed
- Boggs Creek Bridge (circa 1900), spanning Boggs Creek on CR 450 West, Martin County, Indiana
- Cyrus Bridge (1918), along Whites Creek Road, 195 feet (59 m) west of the intersection of County Road 19 and U.S. Route 52, Cyrus, West Virginia
- Smith Bridge (circa 1915–1918), Dooley Road spanning Nottely River, near Blairsville, Union County, Georgia ("Probably Champion Bridge Company")
- St. Anthony Street Bridge (1889), spanning Buffalo Creek in Lewisburg Borough, Kelly Township, Union County, Pennsylvania
