= Parks Covered Bridge =

Parks Covered Bridge may refer to:

- Parks Covered Bridge (Chalfunts, Ohio), listed on the National Register
- Parks Covered Bridge (Trimble, Tennessee), formerly listed on the National Register, one of Tennessee's historic bridges
