= List of bridges on the National Register of Historic Places in Tennessee =

This is a list of bridges and tunnels on the National Register of Historic Places in the U.S. state of Tennessee.

Name	Image	Built	Listed	Location	County	Type
Arch Bridge		1926	2020-07-20	Olive Hill; 35°16′37.2″N 88°01′19.2″W	Hardin	Closed spandrel arch
Big Sewee Creek Bridge		1914	1982-07-06	Decatur; 35°35′37″N 84°42′46″W	Meigs	Through Truss
Byrd Creek Bridge and Dam part of the Cumberland Homesteads Historic District		1936	1988-09-30	Crossville; 35°54′02.4″N 84°59′56.1″W	Cumberland	Stone arch
Chattanooga, Harrison, Georgetown & Charleston Railroad Tunnel		1863	1978-08-24	Chattanooga; 35°3′51″N 85°14′20″W	Hamilton	
Cumberland Mountain Tunnel		1849, 1852	1977-08-22	Cowan	Franklin	
Deep Draw Stone Arch Bridge part of the Cumberland Homesteads Historic District		1934	1988-09-30	Crossville; 35°55′24.3″N 84°56′08.1″W	Cumberland	Stone arch
Elmwood Cemetery, Office and Entrance Bridge	Elwood Cemetery Entrance Bridge	ca. 1880, ca. 1900	1978-05-22	Memphis; 35°7′27″N 90°1′45″W	Shelby	
Falls Mill Arch Bridge part of the Falls Mills Historic District		ca. 1914	1987-07-09	Huntland; 35°05′59.4″N 86°15′33.2″W	Franklin	Stone arch
Firescald Creek Stone Arch Bridge		1906	1987-04-01	Altamont; 35°26′45″N 85°43′46″W	Grundy	Stone arch bridge
Harrisburg Covered Bridge		1875	1975-06-10	Harrisburg; 35°51′39″N 83°28′58″W	Sevier	
Hickory Creek Stone Arch Bridge		1912	1987-04-01	Marvin Chapel; 35°28′35″N 85°50′47″W	Grundy	Stone Arch Bridge
Cordell Hull Bridge		1934	2009-11-20	Carthage; 36°14′54.67″N 85°57′17.11″W	Smith	
Hutsell Truss Bridge		1910	1982-07-06	Ten Mile; 35°36′49″N 84°41′16″W	Meigs	
Kelso Bowstring Arch Truss Bridge		1878	1983-01-04	Kelso; 35°8′17″N 86°28′7″W	Lincoln	Bowstring Arch Truss
Ketner's Mill and Bridge		1824, 1872	1977-11-23	Victoria	Marion	
Kings Mill Bridge		ca. 1884	1982-07-06	Decatur; 35°34′40″N 84°45′34″W	Meigs	Single Span Through Truss
Lebanon Road Stone Arch Bridge		1888	1987-05-13	Nashville; 36°9′16″N 86°44′33″W	Davidson	
L & N Railroad Swing Bridge part of the Clarksville Industrial District		ca. 1860	1976-03-13	Clarksville; 36°31′21.2″N 87°21′52.3″W	Montgomery	
Market Street Bridge	Chief John Ross Bridge	1917	2010-12-20	Chattanooga; 35°3′31″N 85°18′33″W	Hamilton	Chief John Ross Bridge; Bascule bridge
Memphis & Arkansas Bridge	Memphis & Arkansas bridge on the left	1949	2001-02-16	Memphis; 35°7′47″N 90°4′45″W	Shelby	Warren through truss bridge, carries I-55 across the Mississippi River.
Montgomery Bell Tunnel	Montgomery Bell Tunnel	1819	1994-04-19	White Bluff; 36°8′49″N 87°7′19″W	Cheatham	
Old Mail Road Bridge part of the Cumberland Homesteads Historic District		1937	1988-09-30	Crossville; 35°53′35.4″N 85°01′30.7″W	Cumberland	Stone arch
Old Town Bridge		1801, ca. 1820	1988-04-13	Franklin; 35°59′45″N 86°56′10″W	Williamson	
Oneida and Western Bridge		1915	2025-12-18	Oneida; 36°27′15.0″N 84°39′05.8″W	Scott	Whipple through truss
Rainbow Bridge		1921	2026-01-14	Greeneville; 36°07′08.0″N 82°45′25.3″W	Greene	Concrete arch
Shelby Street Bridge		1907, 1909	1986-11-20	Nashville; 36°9′43″N 86°46′19″W	Davidson	Truss & girder span bridge
Sixteen Tunnel		1877	2017-07-10	Sunbright; 36°15′33.3″N 84°39′39.9″W	Morgan	
Southern Railroad Bridge	Southern Railroad Bridge	1900	1989-07-25	Rockford; 35°50′52″N 83°56′45″W	Blount	
Sulphur Fork Bridge	Sulphur Fork Bridge	1890	2020-07-20	Adams; 36°33′15.1″N 87°08′25.4″W	Montgomery	Pratt Truss
Surprise Truss Bridge		1917	1982-07-06	Ten Mile; 35°38′51″N 84°37′58″W	Meigs	
Walland Bridge		1918	1989-07-25	Walland; 35°43′46″N 83°48′58″W	Blount	
Walnut Street Bridge		1891	1990-02-23	Chattanooga; 35°3′44″N 85°18′23″W	Hamilton	Camelback truss, modified
Westmoreland Tunnel		1886	1978-01-20	Westmoreland; 36°33′23.4″N 86°15′02.9″W	Sumner	
Elizabethton Covered Bridge part of the Elizabethton Historic District		1882	1973-03-14	Elizabethton; 36°20′49″N 82°12′43″W	Carter	
Elk Avenue Bridge part of the Elizabethton Historic District		1926	1973-03-14	Elizabethton; 36°20′53″N 82°12′43″W	Carter	
Broad Street Bridge part of the Elizabethton Historic District		1929	1973-03-14	Elizabethton; 36°21′07″N 82°12′47″W	Carter	
Conway Bridge		1925	removed 2025-03-17	Briar Thicket vicinity 36°7′21.2″N 83°7′30.82″W	Greene	
Cumberland Avenue Bridge		1906	removed 2001-07-13	South Pittsburg34°59′33.5″N 85°43′36.2″W	Marion	Single span arch bridge
Elkhead Stone Arch Bridge		ca. 1900	removed 1986-08-01	Pelham	Grundy	
Marion Memorial Bridge		1929, 1930, 1947	removed 2016-06-28	Haletown; 35°1′44″N 85°32′53″W	Marion	Warren and Parker Truss
Paint Rock Creek Covered Bridge		ca. 1870	removed 1980-06-19	Huntsville	Scott	queen post truss
Parks Covered Bridge		1912	removed 1998-03-13	Trimble36°12′16.5″N 89°11′29.9″W	Obion	King post
Scott Creek Stone Arch Bridge		ca. 1898	removed 2022-10-27	Coalmont; 35°18′17″N 85°42′45″W	Grundy	Stone Arch Bridge
