= Chalfant =

Chalfant or Chalfants may refer to:

== People ==
- Chalfant (surname)

== Places ==
- Chalfant, California
- Chalfants, Ohio
- Chalfant, Pennsylvania
