= Mount Zion Church (Decatur, Tennessee) =

Historic church in Tennessee, United States

- U.S. National Register of Historic Places
- Location within Tennessee Location within the United States
- Location: Mt. Zion Hollow, Decatur, Tennessee
- Coordinates: 35°37′28″N 84°38′48″W
- Area: 3 acres (1.2 ha)
- Built: 1850
- MPS: Meigs County, Tennessee MRA
- NRHP reference No.: 82004006
- Added to NRHP: July 06, 1982

Mount Zion Church is a historic church in Mt. Zion Hollow in Decatur, Tennessee, United States.

It is a rectangular frame building that was built in 1850. It was added to the National Register of Historic Places in 1982 as the "best preserved" and "least altered" of the simple rural church structures found in a survey of historic buildings in Meigs County.
