= List of covered bridges in Tennessee =

Covered bridges in Tennessee include those listed in the following table.

Name	Image	County	Location	Built	Length	Crosses	Truss	Notes
Bible Bridge	Bible Bridge	Greene	Warrensburg; 36°7′28″N 83°3′11″W	1922	57 feet (17 m)	Little Chucky Creek	Queen	Also called Chucky Bridge
Elizabethton Covered Bridge	Elizabethton Covered Bridge	Carter	Elizabethton; 36°20′50″N 82°12′43″W	1882	134 feet (41 m)	Doe River	Howe	
Emerts Cove Covered Bridge	Emerts Cove Covered Bridge	Sevier	Gatlinburg; 35°44′51″N 83°24′58″W	2000	84 feet (26 m)	Little Pigeon River	Stringer	
Harrisburg Covered Bridge	Harrisburg Covered Bridge	Sevier	Sevierville; 35°51′39″N 83°28′57″W	1875	88 feet (27 m)	East Fork, Little Pigeon River	King	Also called Pigeon River Covered Bridge, East Fork Bridge, or McNutts Bridge
Holder Bridge	Holder Bridge	Hamblen	Morristown; 36°14′41″N 83°21′27″W	1919	27 feet (8.2 m)	Moyer Branch	Stringer	Private property, but ask at home on right if you can take a closer look (very welcoming)
Parks Bridge		Obion	Trimble; 36°12′18″N 89°11′28″W	1912, rebuilt 1997	33 feet (10 m)	Dry land	King	Also called Emerson E. Parks Farm Bridge

Former covered bridges in the state include

Name	Image	County	Location	Built	Length	Crosses	Truss	Notes
Brice's Covered Bridge		Knox		1878	110 feet (34 m)	Big Flat Creek		Burned in 1968.
Bloomingdale Covered Bridge		Sullivan		ca. 1880	44 feet (13 m)	Reedy Creek		Collapsed in or before 1965.
David Crockette State Park Covered Bridge		Lawrence	Lawrenceburg; 35°15′53.2″N 87°21′22.0″W	1959	58 feet (18 m)	Shoal Creek		Washed away by flood in 1998. Replica built in 1999.
Glen Raven Covered Bridge		Robertson	Cedar Hill			Sulphur Fork (Red River)		Removed in 1958.
Paint Rock Creek Covered Bridge		Scott	Huntsville	ca. 1870	33 feet (10 m)	Paint Rock Creek		Burned in March of 1980. Was included on the National Register of Historic Places before its destruction.
Port Royal Covered Bridge	Port Royal Covered Bridge	Montgomery	Port Royal; 36°33′16.9″N 87°08′33.7″W	1903		Red River	Burr	Damaged by flood in 1998.

== See also ==
- List of bridges on the National Register of Historic Places in Tennessee
- World Guide to Covered Bridges
