= Euchee (disambiguation) =

Euchee is an alternate spelling for Yuchi, an Indigenous people of North America. Euchee may also refer to:

- Euchee town, a Yuchi tribal town on the Chattahoochee River
- Euchee, Tennessee

== See also ==
- Uchee (disambiguation)
