= Meigs County Historical Museum =

- Location within Tennessee
- Established: 2002
- Location: 200 Smith Ave; Decatur, Tennessee, United States
- Coordinates: 35.515957°N 84.788658°W
- Type: History museum
- Owner: Meigs County Historical Society
- Website: www.meigscohistoricalmuseum.org

The Meigs County Historical Museum is located on Smith Avenue in Decatur, Tennessee and is owned and operated by the Meigs County Historical Society. The groundbreaking for this new site was in July 2002. The museum houses many county court and family records. On permanent display is a mural depicting Main Street in Decatur in the 1930s. The mural was funded by grants from the Tennessee Arts Commission and the VEC Customershares program, and painted by Bill McDonald, a local artist.

== Quilt ==
In 1985, the Meigs County Family and Community Education ("FCE") Club began a large quilt to commemorate the early history of Meigs County, for a state project, the Tennessee "Homecoming 1986." The quilt includes images of fourteen sites representing the early history of Meigs County. The central quilt design, including a map of the area to locate the various sites represented, was created by Flossie Bennett, a longtime leader of the FCE. A committee of representatives from Ten Mile, Peakland, Concord, Goodfield, and Decatur, decided which sites would be included in the quilt. The sites chosen were the Elisha Sharp House (also known as the Sharp-Wasson-Worth House, c. 1825), the Stewart House (1830), the R.H. Johnson Stable, the Mount Zion church and Cemetery (1830), Zeigler's Mill (1850, previously 'Gettys Mill'), the Washington Ferry (1808), the Pisah Church (1818), the old gymnasium (c. 1822), the old Meigs County Courthouse (1904), the old Volunteer Electric Cooperative Building (1935), the Ashley House (1885), and the Sam Eaves Store (c. 1861). Nell Jeannette Fields Worth also insisted that images of Hereford cattle be included throughout the quilt, since Meigs County is noted for its beef cattle. The quilt was awarded the "Best Original Design" at the McMinn County Living Heritage Museum's Quilt Show. The quilt initially was displayed at the Meigs-Decatur Public Library, and as of 2010, now hangs in the Meigs County Historical Museum.
