= Rice-Marler House =

- U.S. National Register of Historic Places
- Location within Tennessee
- Location: Goodfield Valley Rd., Decatur, Tennessee
- Coordinates: 35°28′42″N 84°50′07″W
- Area: 2.8 acres (1.1 ha)
- Built: 1856
- MPS: Meigs County, Tennessee MRA
- NRHP reference No.: 82004007
- Added to NRHP: July 6, 1982

The Rice-Marler House, in Decatur, Tennessee, was built in 1856. It was listed on the National Register of Historic Places in 1982.

It is a two-story frame house built upon a stone pier foundation, with a one-story rear ell. Its weatherboard exterior is covered with aluminum siding.

The site includes foundation ruins of a slave cabin.

The house is unusual as one of few I-houses in Meigs County, Tennessee which has a five-bay facade and gable end chimneys. It is also unusual for having graining on its interior doors and marbling on its mantlepieces.
