= Elisha Sharp House =

Historic house in Tennessee, United States

- U.S. National Register of Historic Places
- Location within Tennessee Location within the United States
- Location: Old Ten Mile Road, Ten Mile, Tennessee
- Coordinates: 35°38′34″N 84°40′23″W
- Area: less than one acre
- Built: 1820
- Architect: Sharp, Elisha
- Architectural style: Federal
- MPS: Meigs County, Tennessee MRA
- NRHP reference No.: 82004030
- Added to NRHP: July 6, 1982

The Elisha Sharp House is a house in Ten Mile, Tennessee. It was added to the National Register of Historic Places on July 6, 1982.

Elisha Sharp was born July 25, 1792, and died December 6, 1863. In 1817, he married Elinore Ellen Huff (also spelled “Elinor” and “Eleanor”) (1801–1874). She was sixteen years old, and he was twenty five. They came to Meigs County sometime between 1816 and 1822 (known as Rhea County until 1836). Elisha Sharp was a large landowner and one of six original county commissioners of Meigs County. In 1836, Sharp served as a second lieutenant within the first division of the East Tennessee guard under Brigadier General John E. Wool. Assembled to battle against the Cherokee Nation, the units were sent home in November 1836, since some sort of temporary compromise was made with the Cherokees. Sharp later joined the Confederate Army.

The Sharp cemetery is located just around the corner from the Sharp House, on Union Grove Road, also known as county road 508. The earliest headstone still in this cemetery is dated 1830. Most of the gravestones are of the Sharp family, though there are also about six from the Culvahouses, a family who, until roughly 1955, owned the farm on highway 58, west of the Sharp-Wasson-Worth House. The Elisha Sharp House is located on Old Ten Mile Road, which was once a stage coach route that connected Knoxville and Kingston, Tennessee.

The Sharp House was built between 1820 and 1830, probably after 1825, and is located about twelve miles (19 km) north of Decatur, Tennessee. The Sharp farm was around 226 acres (0.91 km^{2}). Elisha Sharp owned it for around 61 years, from 1816 to 1877. In 1877, the Wasson family purchased it, and owned it until 1932 or 1938. Near this time, electric lines were installed in the area. There were two additional owners between 1938 and 1955.

In 1955, the Sharp House was purchased by James Archibald (aka “J.A.” and “Nub”) Worth, originally from Sevier County, Tennessee. J.A. Worth was a health physicist for Oak Ridge National Laboratories, and later worked at their test site in Arizona to help assess health problems associated with radioactivity exposure. He married Nell Jeanette Fields Worth in 1957, though they did not move to the Sharp House until 1959, when they came to Meigs County from Campbell County. The Worths raised cattle on the surrounding farm for over forty years. J.A. Worth died in 1999, and Nell Worth sold the house and farm to Jerry Swanks, a neighbor and also a farmer, in 2007.

== History ==
The Sharp House was made with bricks, fired in a home kiln. The bricks were made from clay that was most likely taken out of the bank of Hurricane Creek, just few yards away from the house. The interior walls throughout the first floor are about 2 feet (0.61 m) thick.

Little is known about the slaves owned by Elisha Sharp. In a case wherein Elisha Sharp was named as a defendant, it is stated that in 1832 he purchased a woman named Amy (then twenty years old and pregnant), and her children Phillip (age 5), Betsy (age 4). Her child Nancy was born afterwards. It is unknown if this enslaved family lived on the Sharp farm. Amy was the daughter of a woman named Nan. The case challenged Sharp's right to purchase Amy and her children, because the claimants argued that Amy belonged to the estate of a prior owner, and the woman who sold her and her children had no right to sell them to Sharp. The claimants not only accused him of buying the slaves improperly, but that he knew the sale was illegal and even kept the slaves hidden after the sale. Sharp later claimed that he subsequently sold the family to an unknown slave trader in 1836, and had no knowledge of the family's subsequent whereabouts.

A few names of other slaves owned by Elisha Sharp can be gleaned from his will. Tom, Guy, Alexander, Sally, Susan, Martha, Nancy, and Alley, French, Townley and Joseph, Daniel, Simon, Taylor and Nep are all bequeathed to various relatives. Sharp must have owned other unnamed persons—or presumed he would own (acquired through purchase, birth from presently ownedslaves, or inherit), other slaves at the time of his death—because he also bequeaths all slaves not named within the will to his children and grandchildren. The will was dated March 4, 1863, and probated April 3, 1865.

During the Civil War, Elisha Sharp died on December 6, 1863, as a result of a gunshot wound he had suffered approximately two months earlier. He was shot in front of the front door (in 1863 the house had no porch) of the Sharp House. Sharp was shot by Isaac Preston Knight (1834–1907), a local man from Meigs County, who was a union soldier on leave. Apparently, Elisha Sharp had directed his rebel soldiers to steal tools. When Elisha Sharp did not return the tools, apparently some owned by Knight's father, Knight shot him. Other sources confirm Knight was a union soldier, from April 1863, to August 1864. Sharp is said to have lived for two months before he died. The Knights went west after Mr. Sharp was killed.

In the 1960s, while pulling down old wallpaper in the upstairs bedroom above the downstairs living room of the Sharp House, Nell Worth found the following inscription on the wall above the fireplace.

“Remember Me for I may be in these

Western hills where men folks are free

Yours respect.
Moulton Wood
August 28, 1898”

In 1898, the time of the inscription, the home was owned by the Wassons. It is still on the wall as of August 2010, along with the strips of wallpaper that Nell Worth decided not to change for fear of damaging the inscription.

== Quilt ==
In 1985, the FCE Club (“Family and Community Education”) began a large quilt for a state project, the Tennessee “Homecoming 1986.” The house is one of 14 sites representing the early history of Meigs County that are depicted on the quilt. The quilt now hangs in the Meigs County Historical Museum, in Decatur, Tennessee.

== See also ==
- National Register of Historic Places listings in Meigs County, Tennessee
