= Oak Grove Methodist Church =

Historic church in Tennessee, United States

- U.S. National Register of Historic Places
- Location within Tennessee Location within the United States
- Nearest city: Ten Mile, Tennessee
- Coordinates: 35°37′56″N 84°46′12″W
- Area: 2.1 acres (0.85 ha)
- Built: 1890
- MPS: Meigs County, Tennessee MRA
- NRHP reference No.: 82004028
- Added to NRHP: July 06, 1982

Oak Grove Methodist Church is a historic church in Ten Mile, Tennessee.

It was built in 1890 in the Gothic Revival style. It was added to the National Register of Historic Places in 1982.
