= Sam Hutsell House =

Historic place in Ten Mile, Tennessee, USA

- U.S. National Register of Historic Places
- Location: Old Ten Mile Rd., Ten Mile, Tennessee
- Coordinates: 35°36′46″N 84°41′15″W
- Area: 0.6 acres (0.24 ha)
- Built: 1858
- Built by: Hutsell, Sam
- MPS: Meigs County, Tennessee MRA
- NRHP reference No.: 82004025
- Added to NRHP: July 6, 1982

The Sam Hutsell House, on Old Ten Mile Rd. in Ten Mile, Tennessee, was built in 1858. It was listed on the National Register of Historic Places in 1982.

It is a two-story L-shaped brick house, with brick laid in common bond (brick) and with interior as well as exterior walls made of solid brick. It reflects Greek Revival architectural influence.

It was built by brickmason Sam Hutsell with slave labor, with bricks fired on the site.
