= Parks Covered Bridge (Chalfunts, Ohio) =

- U.S. National Register of Historic Places
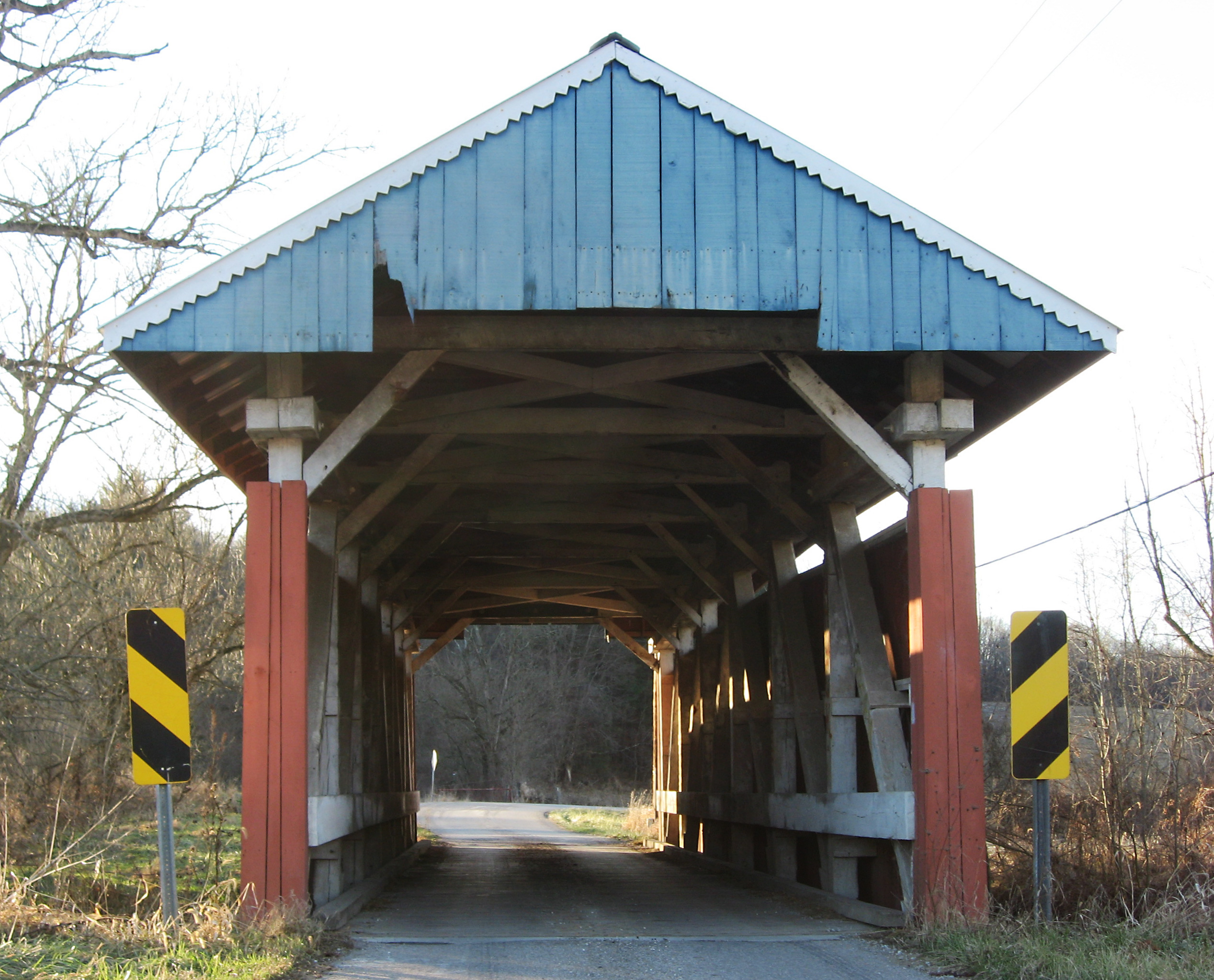

- Location within Ohio
- Nearest city: Chalfants, Ohio
- Coordinates: 39°51′09″N 82°16′45″W
- Area: less than one acre
- Built: 1883
- Built by: Dean, William A..; Tracey, J. T.
- Architectural style: Multiple kingpost truss
- NRHP reference No.: 74001590
- Added to NRHP: September 10, 1974

The Parks Covered Bridge, in Perry County, Ohio near Chalfants, Ohio, was built in 1883. It was listed on the National Register of Historic Places in 1974.

It was built by William A. Dean and J.T. Tracey.

It spans a branch of Jonathan Creek and is an example of a multiple kingpost truss covered bridge.

It is located south of Chalfants, and north of Somerset on County Road 33, in Hopewell Township, Perry County, Ohio.

== History ==
The bridge features a multiple kingpost truss design and spans a branch of Jonathan Creek on County Road 33. It was added to the National Register of Historic Places in 1974. The bridge is one of three nearly identical multiple kingpost covered bridges built in Perry County between 1874 and 1883.
