= Blackburn Point Swing Bridge =

Bridge in Florida, United States of America

Blackburn Point Bridge
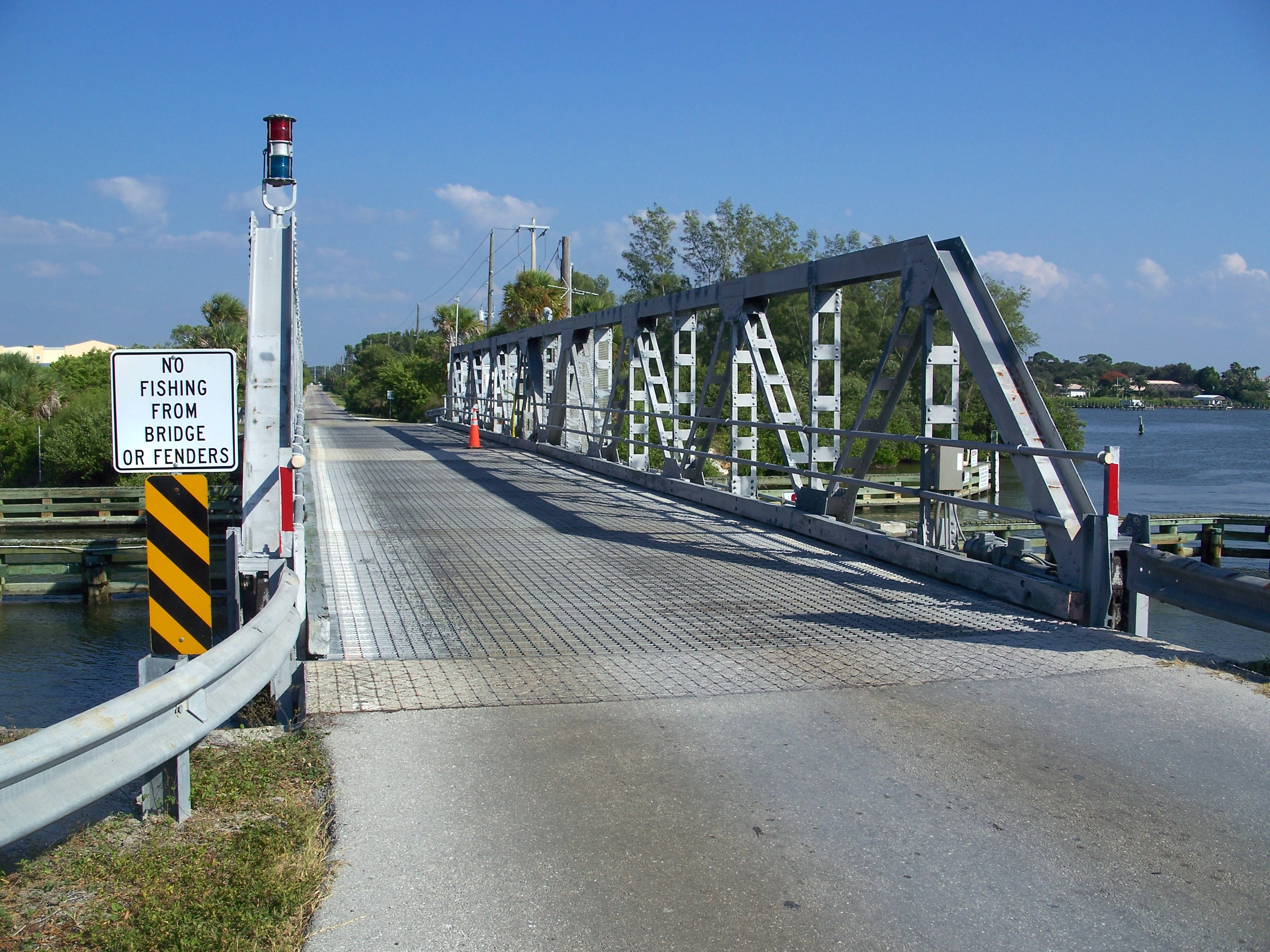
- Coordinates: 27°10′46″N 82°29′41″W
- Carries: CR 789
- Crosses: Gulf Intracoastal Waterway
- Locale: Osprey, Florida
- Official name: Blackburn Point Bridge
- Owner: Sarasota County
- Maintained by: Sarasota County
- ID number: 170064

Characteristics
- Design: Swing bridge
- Material: Steel
- Trough construction: Steel
- Pier construction: Concrete
- Total length: 142.1 ft (43 m)
- Width: 15.7 ft (5 m)
- Longest span: 142.1 ft (43 m)
- No. of spans: 1
- Piers in water: 1
- Clearance below: 51 ft (16 m)
- No. of lanes: 1

History
- Architect: Champion Bridge Company
- Constructed by: Quinn and Powell Construction
- Construction start: 1925
- Opened: December 15, 1926

Statistics
- Daily traffic: 4,900 (2015)
- Toll: None
- Blackburn Point Bridge
- U.S. National Register of Historic Places
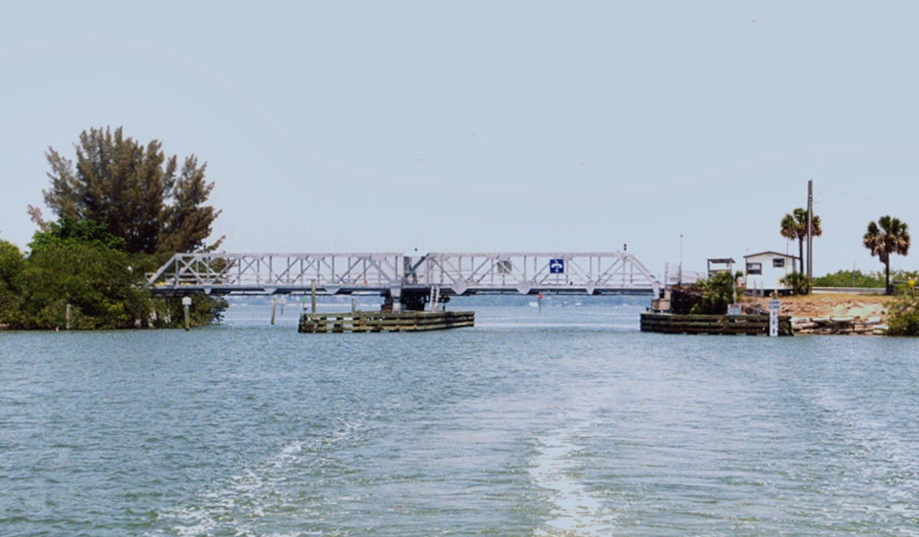
- Side view of the bridge, from a boat

- Location within Florida Location within the United States
- Location: Osprey, Florida
- Coordinates: 27°10′46″N 82°29′41″W
- Built: 1926
- NRHP reference No.: 01000290
- Added to NRHP: March 29, 2001

Location
- Interactive map of Blackburn Point Bridge

The Blackburn Point Swing Bridge is a swing bridge near Osprey, Florida, United States built over the Gulf Intracoastal Waterway. The bridge and another bridge connect Casey Key to the Florida mainland. It is listed on the U.S. National Register of Historic Places and is a one-lane steel truss swing bridge along Blackburn Point Road. It is the northernmost of the two bridges connecting the barrier island of Casey Key to the mainland.

== History ==
In 1924, a bond was approved for 15 roads and five new bridges, including Blackburn Point Bridge and the road. The Sarasota County Commission awarded the contract for constructing the Blackburn Point and Stickney Point bridges to the Champion Bridge Company of Wilmington, Ohio on February 2, 1925. The steel truss swing bridge opened to traffic in December 1926. It contains port and starboard signals along the north truss of the bridge. Along Blackburn Point Road, it connects Casey Key to the Tamiami Trail (US 41).

The bridge has 9 foot vertical clearance and 51 foot horizontal clearance for navigation. A 7.5 horsepower motor was added to operate the pony truss bridge in the 1970s. The bridge was added to the National Register on March 29, 2001.

In 1981 it was hit by a barge and repairs needed. In 1987 the bridge was brought to shore for extensive repair work.

Blackburn Point Park, the Casey Key Library, and Casey Key Fish House, a seafood grill, are located by it.

== See also ==
- National Register of Historic Places listings in Sarasota County, Florida
