= Uchee (disambiguation) =

Uchee is an alternate spelling for Yuchi, an Indigenous people of North America. Uchee may also refer to:

- Uchee Billy (d. 1837), Yuchi chief in Florida
- Uchee, Alabama
- Uchee Creek (Georgia)
- Uchee Creek (Alabama)

== See also ==
- Euchee (disambiguation)
