= Cute, Tennessee =

- Ghost town
- Location within Tennessee Location within the United States
- Coordinates: 35°34′29″N 84°44′00″W
- Country: United States
- State: Tennessee
- County: Meigs
- Elevation: 712 ft (217 m)
- Time zone: UTC-5 (Eastern (EST))
  - Summer (DST): UTC-4 (EDT)
- GNIS feature ID: 1309900

Cute is a ghost town in Meigs County, Tennessee, United States.

A post office located inside a store in Cute operated from 1881 to 1907.
