= Goose Creek Foot Bridge =

- U.S. National Register of Historic Places
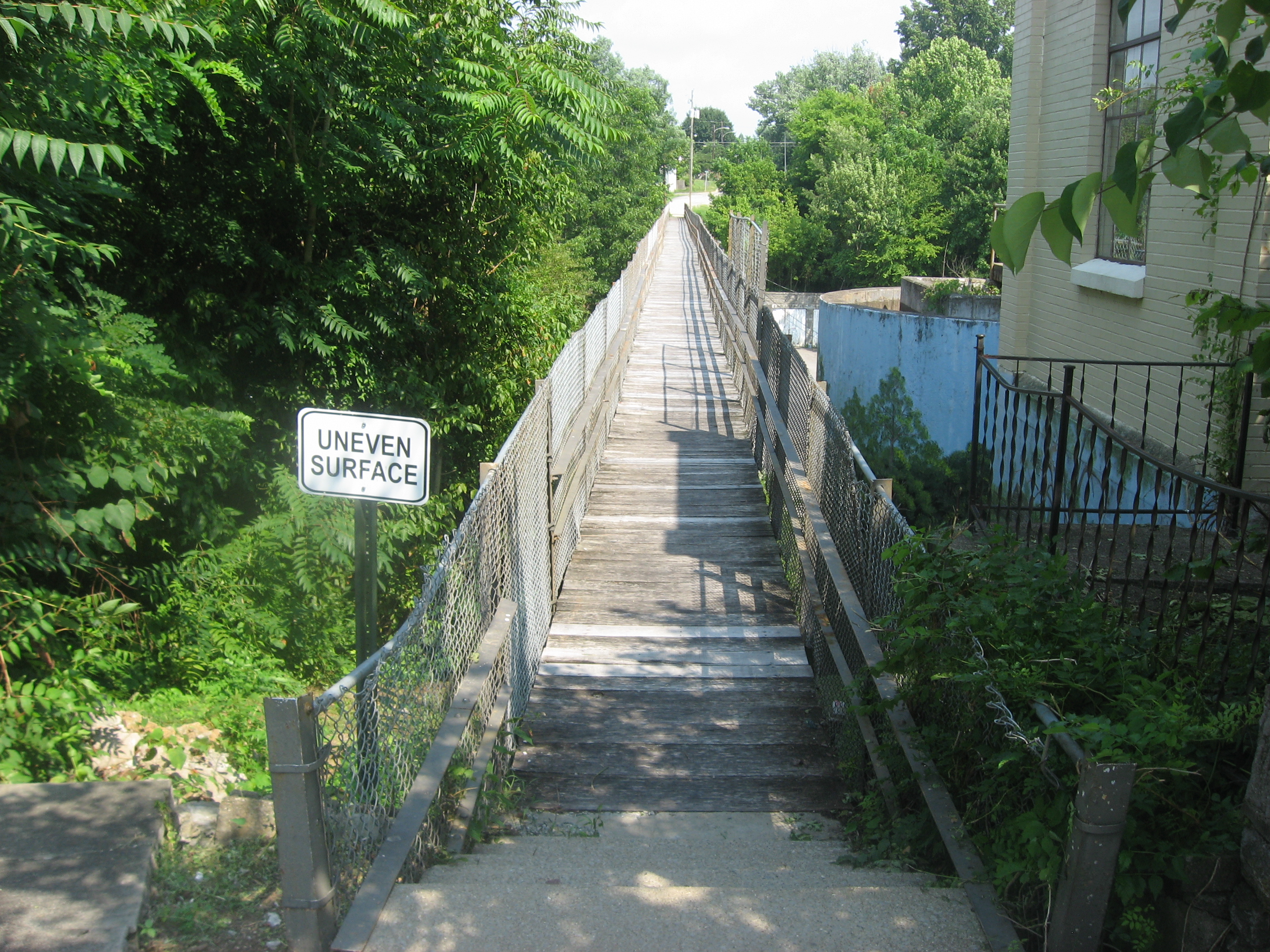
- Goose Creek Foot Bridge, from the west end

- Location within Kentucky
- Location: Court and Depot Sts., Greensburg, Kentucky, U.S.
- Coordinates: 37°15′36″N 85°30′01″W
- Area: less than one acre
- Built: 1928
- Architect: Champion Bridge Company
- MPS: Green County MRA
- NRHP reference No.: 85000911
- Added to NRHP: April 19, 1985

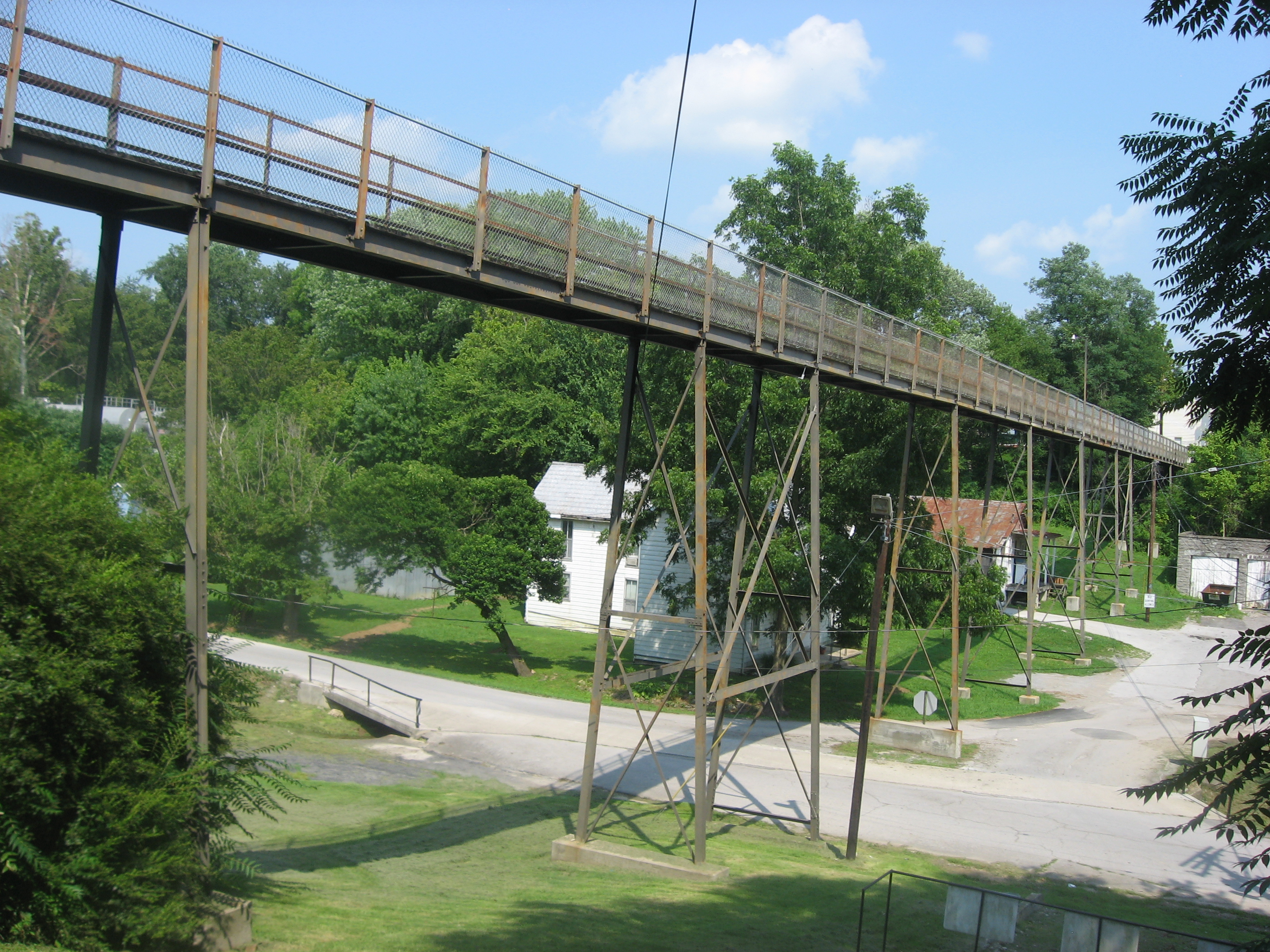
Goose Creek Foot Bridge, looking from below

Goose Creek Foot Bridge is a historic 1928 footbridge in Greensburg, Kentucky. It is listed on the National Register of Historic Places since 1985, and is part of the Green County Multiple Resource Area (MRA).

== History ==
A contract for the Goose Creek Foot Bridge construction for US$4,500 was signed December 17, 1928. It connects Court Street and Depot Street for pedestrians. The 445 feet (136 m) long bridge has a five foot wide wooden plank walkway that connects the railroad depot to the town square. The bridge is 40 feet high at its highest point.

One terminus of it is by the Old Greensburg City Hall, which was a Works Progress Administration building.

The area below the footbridge has flooded, and a photo of the bridge was taken during the flooding, prior to construction of the Green River Dam.

== See also ==
- National Register of Historic Places listings in Green County, Kentucky
