= Decatur Methodist Church =

Historic church in Tennessee, United States

- U.S. National Register of Historic Places
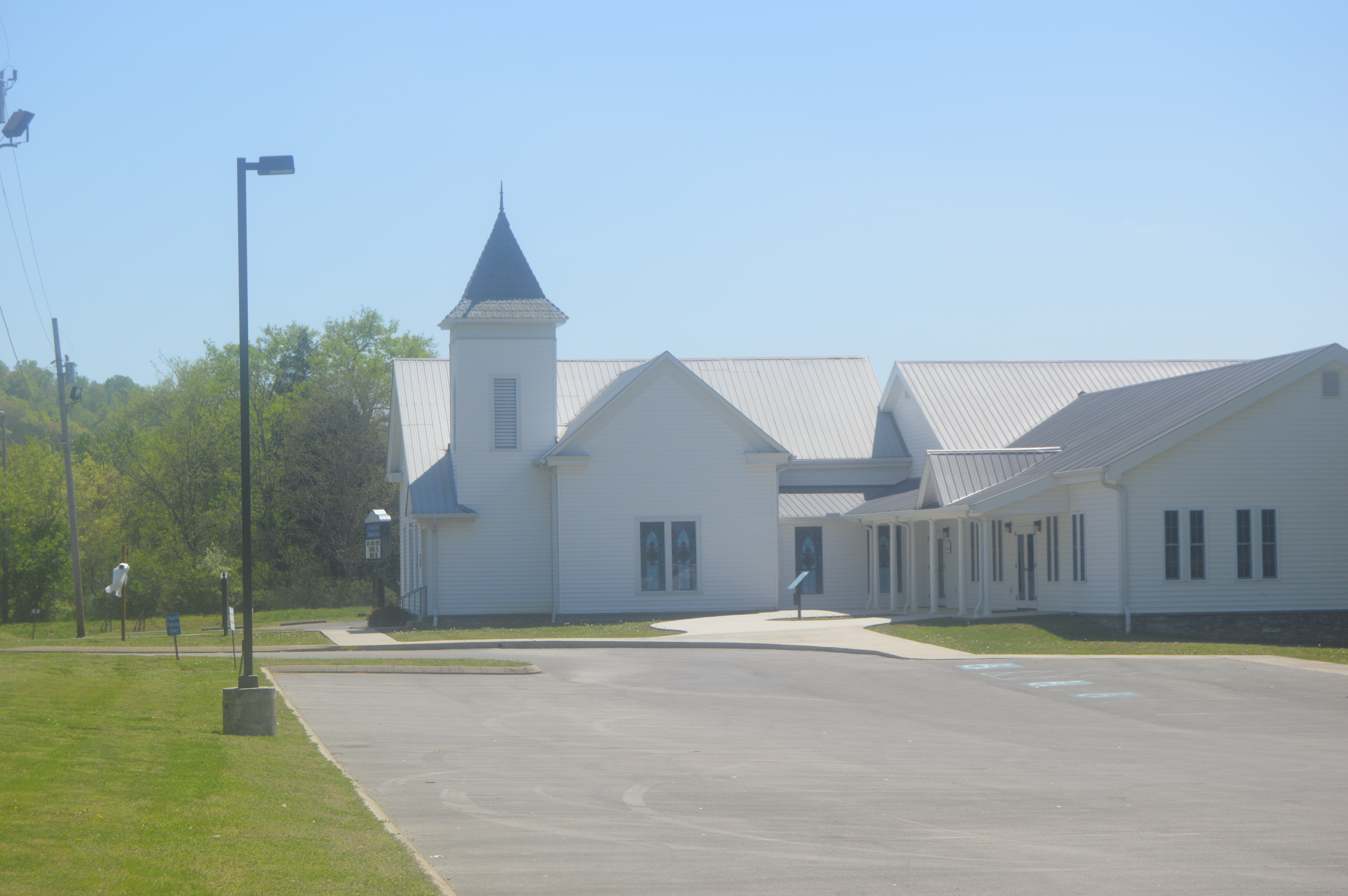
- View from the north

- Location within Tennessee Location within the United States
- Location: Vernon St., Decatur, Tennessee
- Coordinates: 35°30′46″N 84°47′31″W
- Area: 1.6 acres (0.65 ha)
- Built: 1859
- Architectural style: Gothic Revival
- MPS: Meigs County, Tennessee MRA
- NRHP reference No.: 82003997
- Added to NRHP: July 06, 1982

Decatur United Methodist Church is a historic church on Vernon Street in Decatur, Tennessee. It is one of nine active United Methodist churches affiliated with the Meigs County United Methodist Parish.

The church building was built in 1859 and added to the National Register of Historic Places in 1982.
