= Big Spring, Meigs County, Tennessee =

Big Spring, Tennessee
- Unincorporated community
- Location within Tennessee Location within the United States
- Coordinates: 35°23′35″N 84°54′02″W
- Country: United States
- State: Tennessee
- County: Meigs
- Elevation: 699 ft (213 m)
- Time zone: UTC-5 (Eastern (EST))
  - Summer (DST): UTC-4 (EDT)
- Area code: 423
- GNIS feature ID: 1307408

Big Spring is an unincorporated community in Meigs County, Tennessee, United States. It is located along Tennessee State Route 58 between Georgetown and Decatur, approximately two miles north of the banks of the Hiwassee River.

== Notable people ==
- Jordan Anderson, an ex-slave and author of a famous letter, which would later be published as "Letter from a Freedman to His Old Master"
