= Harrisburg Covered Bridge =

Bridge in Sevier County, Tennessee, US

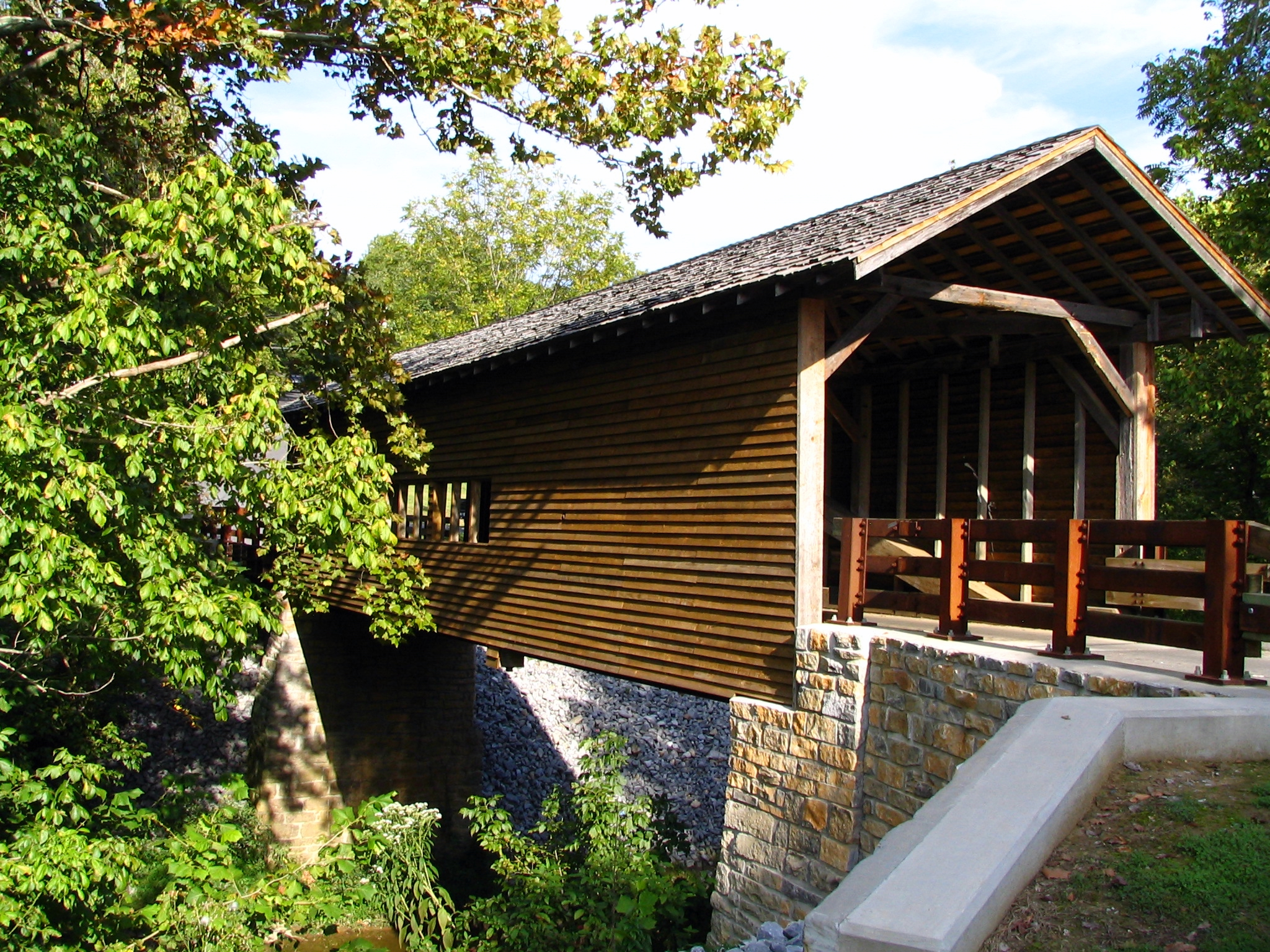
- Harrisburg Covered Bridge (2006)
- Coordinates: 35.860943°N 83.482549°W
- Crosses: East Fork Little Pigeon River
- Locale: East of Sevierville (Tennessee)

Characteristics
- Design: King post truss covered bridge
- Width: 88 feet (26.9 m)
- Longest span: 64 feet (19.5 m)

History
- Construction end: 1875

Statistics
- Daily traffic: 20
- Harrisburg Covered Bridge
- U.S. National Register of Historic Places
- U.S. Historic district – Contributing property
- NRHP reference No.: 75001777
- Added to NRHP: June 10, 1975

Location
- Interactive map of Harrisburg Covered Bridge

The Harrisburg Covered Bridge (also called Pigeon River Covered Bridge, East Fork Bridge or McNutts Bridge) is a historic covered bridge in Sevier County, Tennessee. It is located east of Sevierville off U.S. Route 411. The bridge is a king post truss design and crosses the East Fork of Little Pigeon River.

== History ==
Before the Harrisburg Bridge was built in 1875, the McNutts Bridge, which was washed away during a flood, existed in the same place. In March of that year, the Sevier County Court ordered a panel to be used to carry out and organize the construction of a new bridge. Panel members were J.H. Frame, A.E. Murphy, and D.W. Howard. As usual at the time, the local population contributed to the financing, or provided them with construction material, or worked as an assistant in building the project. The voluntary cash donations totalled $50, with the county's $25 contribution.

In the late 19th century, the population around Harrisburg was growing, and life in the area flourished with the many local mills and blacksmith workshops. After 1915 a bypass was built around Harrisburg, and the community slowly disappeared as many people moved away.

In 1952, the bridge was stabilized with the help of a concrete bridge pillar attached to the building framework. In the 1970s, the overall state of the bridge had deteriorated so much that it was thought to demolish it, until the organization Daughters of the American Revolution raised the necessary financial resources to rehabilitate the bridge. It was also the organization that made the request to include the bridge in the National Register of Historic Places, which succeeded in 1975.

In 1983, the bridge was repaired with a load limit of three tons. In 2004, various repairs were carried out on the bridge, and the permissible total weight was increased to 15 tons. As of 2010, an average of 20 vehicles per day crossed the bridge.

== Construction ==
Elbert Stephenson Early (1850 – 1917) was appointed as head of the construction project. The Early family settled in the area in the 1870s. Many of the family members were trained craftsmen, including carpenters, mill builders, locksmiths and engineers.

The span of the bridge is 64 feet (19.5 m), the total length 88 feet (26.9 m), the inner width 10 feet (3.2 m). The building material of the walls consists partly of tinplate.

== See also ==
- National Register of Historic Places listings in Sevier County, Tennessee
- List of bridges on the National Register of Historic Places in Tennessee
- List of covered bridges in Tennessee
