= Meigs County Courthouse (Tennessee) =

- U.S. National Register of Historic Places
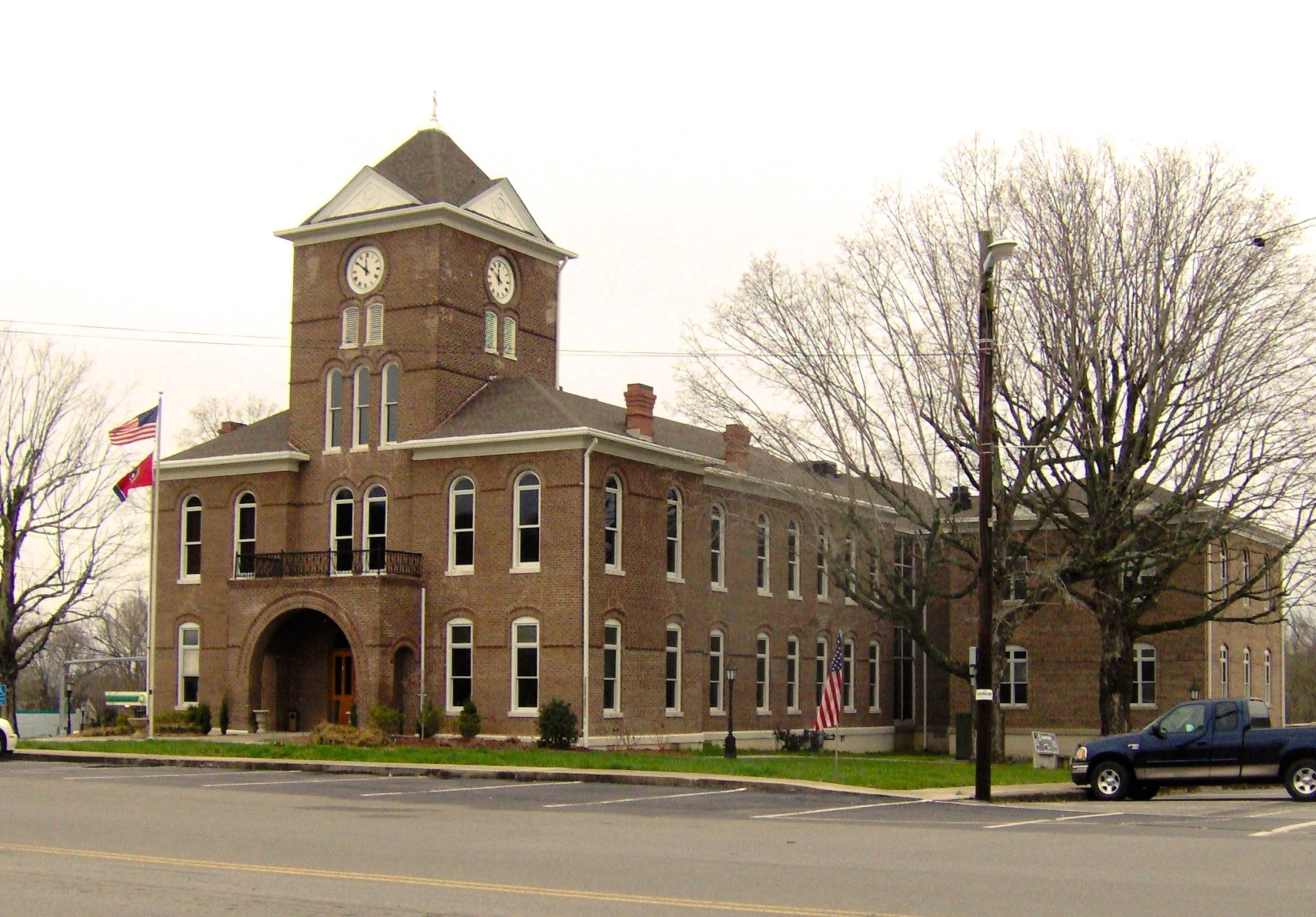

- Location within Tennessee Location within the United States
- Location: Court Sq., Decatur, Tennessee
- Coordinates: 35°30′53″N 84°47′24″W
- Area: 1.5 acres (0.61 ha)
- Built: 1903
- Built by: Broadway Manufacturing Company
- Architect: R.W. Harper
- MPS: Meigs County, Tennessee MRA (AD)
- NRHP reference No.: 78002613
- Added to NRHP: August 3, 1978

The Meigs County Courthouse in Decatur, Tennessee was built in 1903. It was listed on the National Register of Historic Places in 1978.

It is a two-story building on a brick foundation.
