= Washington Ferry =

- Hastings-Locke Ferry
- U.S. National Register of Historic Places
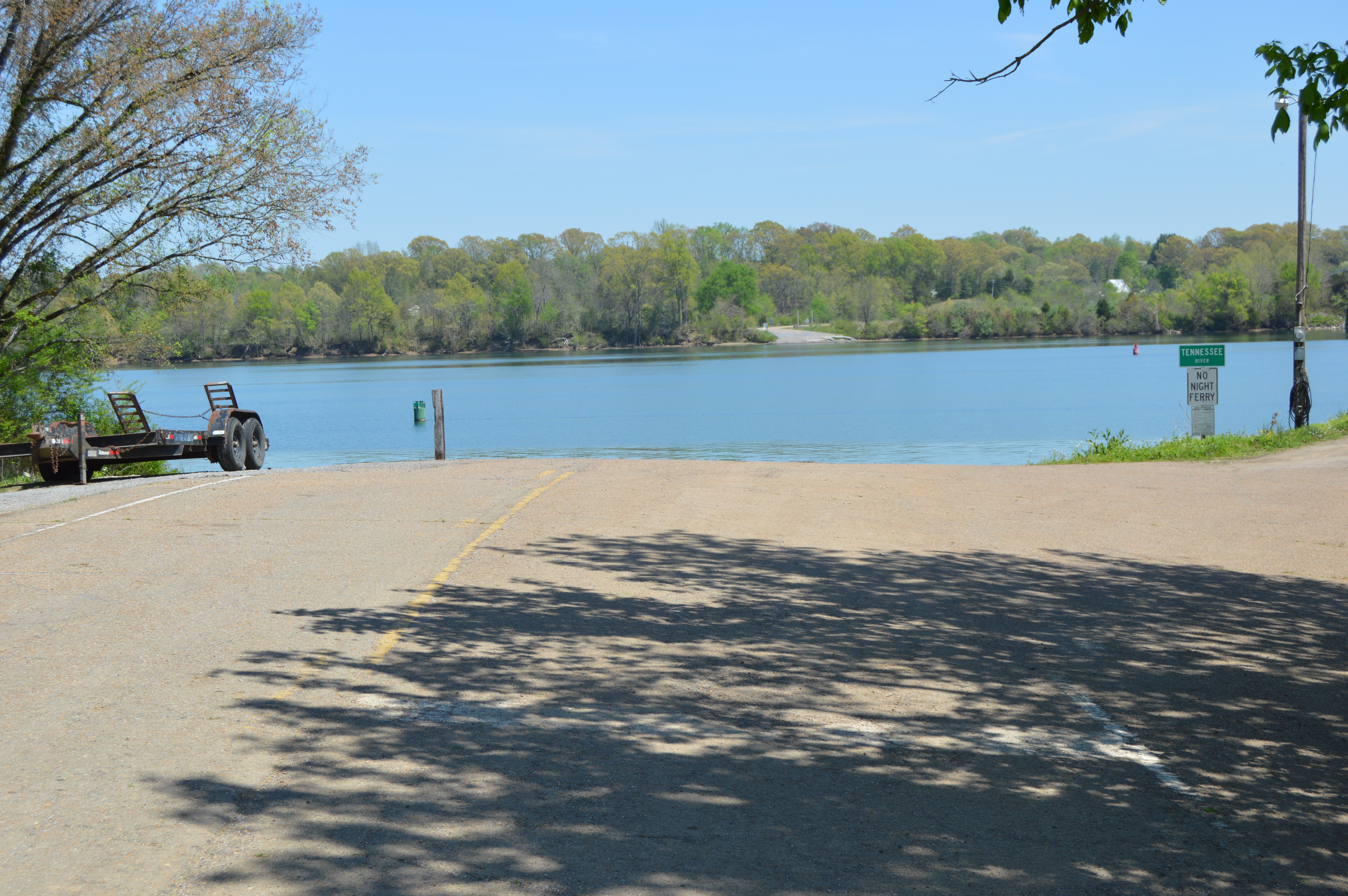

- Location within Tennessee
- Nearest city: Decatur, Tennessee
- Coordinates: 35°32′15″N 84°52′41″W
- Area: 9.1 acres (3.7 ha)
- MPS: Meigs County, Tennessee MRA
- NRHP reference No.: 83003056
- Added to NRHP: January 5, 1983

The Washington Ferry, also known as the Old Washington Ferry or the Hastings-Locke Ferry, was a ferry on the Tennessee River near Decatur, Tennessee. It was listed on the National Register of Historic Places in 1983. The ferry was located on Tennessee State Route 30 (SR 30) between Decatur and Dayton, Tennessee, and operated until a nearby bridge opened on this route in 1996.

== History ==
The listing included two landings, the c.1940 boat/barge which can transport six cars, and the waterway across the river. The ferry was established around 1807 by Conley Hastings. The ferry was operated by the Locke family from about 1820. Solomon Henry and Sons operated the ferry through the 1870s and 1880s. It was once one of many ferries across the Tennessee River and tributaries, but in 1982 it was one of only five ferries still in operation in Tennessee. The ferry closed on September 17, 1996, the same day the Governor Ned Ray McWherter Bridge opened on SR 30 immediately downstream. The bridge was dedicated in honor of Tennessee Governor Ned McWherter on August 19, 2014. During his term as governor, McWherter worked to appropriate funds for the bridge and the expansion of SR 30 to four lanes between Decatur and I-75.
