= Chalfant (surname) =

Chalfant is a surname. Notable people with the surname include:

- Henry Chalfant (born 1940), American photographer and videographer, husband of Kathleen
- Jefferson David Chalfant, American painter
- Kathleen Chalfant (born 1945), American actress
- Kevin Chalfant, American singer-songwriter
