= Euchee, Tennessee =

Coordinates: 35°40′33″N 84°43′01″W

Euchee is an unincorporated community in Meigs County, in the U.S. state of Tennessee.

== History ==
A post office called Euchee was established in 1870, and remained in operation until 1935. Most of what was the community of Euchee is now under the waters of Watts Bar Lake. The post office closed in 1935 as TVA was buying up the land needed for the new reservoir. Construction of the dam began in 1939 after all properties including the old Euchee Post Office had been demolished to make room for the reservoir. The post office wasn't the only building demolished, an old school, ferry crossing and some homes were torn down in the Euchee community to make way for the TVA reservoir waters. Today all that is left of what was Euchee is a campground and resort on the remaining peninsula of higher ground that wasn't inundated by Watts Bar Lake. Euchee today is part of the Ten Mile community and zip code of 37880. The community was named after the Yuchi (or Euchee) Indians.
