= Surprise Truss Bridge =

- U.S. National Register of Historic Places
- Location within Tennessee Location within the United States
- Location: Sewee Creek Rd., Ten Mile, Tennessee
- Coordinates: 35°38′51″N 84°37′58″W
- Area: 0.2 acres (0.081 ha)
- Built: 1917
- Built by: Champion Bridge Co.
- Architectural style: Pratt truss
- MPS: Meigs County, Tennessee MRA
- NRHP reference No.: 82004031
- Added to NRHP: July 6, 1982

The Surprise Truss Bridge in Ten Mile, Tennessee was built in 1917. It was listed on the National Register of Historic Places in 1982.

It crosses Sewee Creek and was built by the Champion Bridge Co. of Wilmington, Ohio.

The bridge has one steel bedstead/truss leg span. It is pinconnected and uses a Pratt truss configuration.
