= Blackford Creek =

Stream in Daviess and Hancock County, Kentucky, U.S.

Coordinates: 37.92406°N 86.97737°W

Blackford Creek is a stream in Daviess and Hancock counties, Kentucky, in the United States. It is a tributary of the Ohio River.

Blackford Creek was named for Joseph Blackford, a pioneer who was killed by Indians on the creek, and buried nearby. However, another stated origin is that Blackford Creek was named after a hunter who camped and hunted by the creek. Blackford Creek is also named as Otter Creek and Muddy Creek

== Features ==
The creek sits on a 107 meter of elevation, with humid sub-tropical climate, this creek is described as a Stream. There are also many localities around Blackford Creek, such as mines and factory mills, See more here. Map of Blackford Creek here.

== Bridge ==
The Ray Road Bridge was a bridge that went across Blackford Creek, it was built in 1884 by the Smith Bridge Company of Toledo, Ohio. The bridge design is a Truss bridge with its length being 92 feet (28 meters) across, and 10.8 feet (3.3 meters), with weight limit of 3 tons. However, the bridge today has collapsed or demolished. Photos of the bridge here.

== See also ==
- List of rivers of Kentucky
