= Chalfants, Ohio =

Unincorporated community in Ohio, U.S.

Coordinates: 39°52′09″N 82°17′07″W

Chalfants is an unincorporated community in Perry County, in the U.S. state of Ohio.

== History ==
Chalfants had its start around 1871 when the railroad was extended to that point. A post office called Chalfants was established in 1877, and remained in operation until 1932.
