= Meigs County, Tennessee =

County in Tennessee, United States

- County
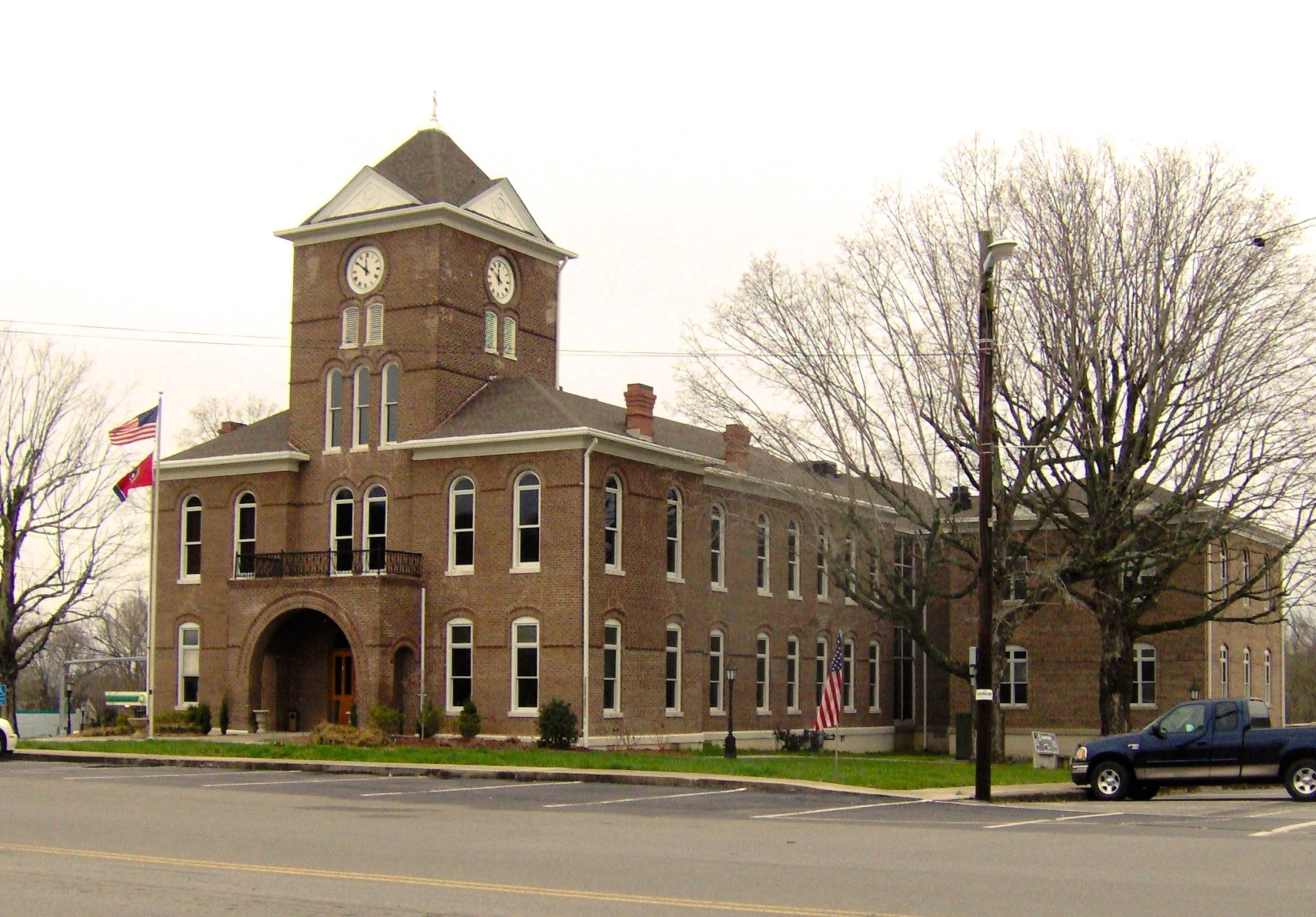
- Meigs County Courthouse in Decatur

- Location within the U.S. state of Tennessee
- Coordinates: 35°31′N 84°49′W
- Country: United States
- State: Tennessee
- Founded: 1836
- Named for: Return J. Meigs
- Seat: Decatur
- Largest town: Decatur

Area
  - Total: 217 sq mi (560 km^{2})
  - Land: 195 sq mi (510 km^{2})
  - Water: 22 sq mi (57 km^{2}) 10%

Population (2020)
  - Total: 12,758
  - Estimate (2025): 14,186 ▲
  - Density: 60/sq mi (23/km^{2})
- Time zone: UTC−5 (Eastern)
  - Summer (DST): UTC−4 (EDT)
- Congressional district: 4th
- Website: www.meigscounty.org

Meigs County is a county located in the U.S. state of Tennessee. As of the 2020 census, the population was 12,758. Its county seat is Decatur.

It is a component of the Athens, Tennessee, Micropolitan Area.

== History ==
Before 1819, the area that is now Meigs County was part of the Cherokee nation. It had been inhabited for thousands of years by succeeding cultures of indigenous peoples. European trades had interacted with the Cherokee since the late 17th century, coming from colonial settlements in Virginia and South Carolina.

Following the American Revolutionary War, American settlers began to enter the territory in greater numbers. They established ferries across the Tennessee River from Rhea County as early as 1807. Colonel Return J. Meigs, a Revolutionary veteran and namesake for the county, was appointed as the United States Indian agent, based in Rhea County until 1817. He supervised trade with the Cherokee. That year, the agency was moved to an area in what is now Meigs County.

In 1819, the US made what is known as the Calhoun Treaty with the Cherokee, forcing them to cede lands north of the Hiwassee River for settlement. Meigs County was formed by the Tennessee legislature in 1836 from parts of Rhea County.

In 1830, the United States Congress passed the Indian Removal Act, forcibly removing the “Five Civilized Tribes” from the Southeast. The Cherokee were the last to go. They were gathered in internment camps in Tennessee and Alabama before being forced on the long overland journey to Indian Territory (modern day Oklahoma), in a 19th-century event known as the "Trail of Tears." Many crossed the Tennessee River at Blythe Ferry, in the southwestern part of Meigs County.

In June 1861, at the outbreak of the Civil War, the residents of Meigs County were among the few in East Tennessee to vote in favor of Tennessee's Ordinance of Secession. The county voted 481 to 267 in favor of the Ordinance, which severed the state's ties to the Union. Earlier in February 1861, Meigs County was alongside Sullivan County one of only two counties in East Tennessee voting to support a secession convention, which it did by a vote of 338 to 323. The county provided troops for both sides during the course of the war.

=== 20th century to present ===
In 1985, the Meigs County Family and Community Education ("FCE") Club began a large quilt to commemorate the early history of Meigs County as part of Tennessee's 1986 Homecoming celebrations. It includes images of fourteen sites representing the early history of Meigs County. The central quilt design, including a map to locate the sites represented, was made by the late Flossie Bennett, a longtime leader of the FCE. A committee of representatives from Ten Mile, Peakland, Concord, Goodfield, and Decatur, decided which sites would be included.

These were the Elisha Sharp House (now the Sharp-Wasson-Worth House, c. 1825), the Stewart House (1830), R. H. Johnson's stable, Mount Zion church and Cemetery (1830), Zeigler's Mill (1850, previously called Gettys Mill), the Washington Ferry (1808), Pisgah Church (1818), the old gymnasium (c. 1822), the old Meigs County Courthouse (1904), the old Volunteer Electric Cooperative Building (1935), the Ashley House (1885), and the Sam Eaves Store (c. 1861). The quilt also included Hereford cattle, since Meigs County is noted for its beef cattle.

The quilt was awarded "Best Original Design" at the McMinn County Living Heritage Museum's Quilt Show. Initially displayed at the Meigs-Decatur Public Library, the quilt now hangs in the Meigs County Historical Museum in Decatur.

A new building was constructed in Decatur to house the collection of the Meigs County Historical Museum. It opened in July 2002. The Meigs County Historical Museum houses many court and family records. On permanent display is a mural depicting Main Street in Decatur in the 1930s. The mural was funded by grants from the Tennessee Arts Commission and the VEC Customer shares program. It was painted by local artist Bill McDonald.

In 2005, Cherokee Removal Memorial Park was established along the banks of the Tennessee River at the landing of Blythe Ferry to memorialize the Cherokees who were forcibly removed and died during the Trail of Tears. In 2026, this park became Cherokee Trail of Tears State Park.

== Geography ==
According to the U.S. Census Bureau, the county has a total area of 217 square miles (560 km^{2}), of which 195 square miles (510 km^{2}) is land and 22 square miles (57 km^{2}) (10%) is water.

The main geographic feature of Meigs County is the Tennessee River, which forms the county's western boundary. Watts Bar Dam is located along the river between Meigs and adjacent Rhea County. Above it is the manmade Watts Bar Lake, which spans the river upstream to Fort Loudoun Dam just west of Knoxville. Watts Bar Dam's tailwaters are part of Chickamauga Lake, which stretches downstream to Chickamauga Dam in Chattanooga. The mouth of the Hiwassee River flows into the Tennessee River at a point in southwestern Meigs County, near where Meigs, Rhea, and Hamilton counties meet.

=== Adjacent counties ===
- Roane County, Tennessee (north)
- McMinn County, Tennessee (east)
- Bradley County, Tennessee (southeast)
- Hamilton County, Tennessee (south)
- Rhea County, Tennessee (west)

=== State protected areas ===
- Chickamauga Wildlife Management Area (part)
- Hiwassee Refuge (part)

== Demographics ==
Historical population
Census	Pop.	Note	%±
1840	4,794		—
1850	4,879		1.8%
1860	4,667		−4.3%
1870	4,511		−3.3%
1880	7,117		57.8%
1890	6,930		−2.6%
1900	7,491		8.1%
1910	6,131		−18.2%
1920	6,077		−0.9%
1930	6,127		0.8%
1940	6,393		4.3%
1950	6,080		−4.9%
1960	5,160		−15.1%
1970	5,219		1.1%
1980	7,431		42.4%
1990	8,033		8.1%
2000	11,086		38.0%
2010	11,753		6.0%
2020	12,758		8.6%
2025 (est.)	14,186	▲	11.2%
U.S. Decennial Census; 1790-1960 1900-1990; 1990-2000 2010-2014

=== Racial and ethnic composition ===
Meigs County, Tennessee – Racial and ethnic composition Note: the US Census treats Hispanic/Latino as an ethnic category. This table excludes Latinos from the racial categories and assigns them to a separate category. Hispanics/Latinos may be of any race.
Race / Ethnicity (NH = Non-Hispanic)	Pop 1980	Pop 1990	Pop 2000	Pop 2010	Pop 2020	% 1980	% 1990	% 2000	% 2010	% 2020
White alone (NH)	7,240	7,868	10,788	11,261	11,823	97.43%	97.95%	97.31%	95.81%	92.67%
Black or African American alone (NH)	132	118	137	116	131	1.78%	1.47%	1.24%	0.99%	1.03%
Native American or Alaska Native alone (NH)	9	28	20	58	58	0.12%	0.35%	0.18%	0.49%	0.45%
Asian alone (NH)	4	2	20	18	26	0.05%	0.02%	0.18%	0.15%	0.20%
Native Hawaiian or Pacific Islander alone (NH)	x	x	0	0	1	x	x	0.00%	0.00%	0.01%
Other race alone (NH)	0	0	1	2	38	0.00%	0.00%	0.01%	0.02%	0.30%
Mixed race or Multiracial (NH)	x	x	57	122	461	x	x	0.51%	1.04%	3.61%
Hispanic or Latino (any race)	46	17	63	176	220	0.62%	0.21%	0.57%	1.50%	1.72%
Total	7,431	8,033	11,086	11,753	12,758	100.00%	100.00%	100.00%	100.00%	100.00%

=== 2020 census ===
As of the 2020 census, there were 12,758 people, 5,058 households, and 3,331 families residing in the county.

The median age was 45.8 years. 20.8% of residents were under the age of 18 and 20.9% of residents were 65 years of age or older. For every 100 females there were 99.5 males, and for every 100 females age 18 and over there were 98.7 males age 18 and over.

The racial makeup of the county was 93.2% White, 1.1% Black or African American, 0.5% American Indian and Alaska Native, 0.2% Asian, <0.1% Native Hawaiian and Pacific Islander, 0.9% from some other race, and 4.2% from two or more races. Hispanic or Latino residents of any race comprised 1.7% of the population.

<0.1% of residents lived in urban areas, while 100.0% lived in rural areas.

There were 5,058 households in the county, of which 28.9% had children under the age of 18 living in them. Of all households, 52.5% were married-couple households, 18.4% were households with a male householder and no spouse or partner present, and 21.8% were households with a female householder and no spouse or partner present. About 24.8% of all households were made up of individuals and 11.8% had someone living alone who was 65 years of age or older.

There were 6,042 housing units, of which 16.3% were vacant. Among occupied housing units, 77.6% were owner-occupied and 22.4% were renter-occupied. The homeowner vacancy rate was 1.1% and the rental vacancy rate was 7.4%.

=== 2000 census ===
As of the census of 2000, there were 11,086 people, 4,304 households, and 3,262 families residing in the county. The population density was 57 people per square mile (22 people/km^{2}). There were 5,188 housing units at an average density of 27 units per square mile (10/km^{2}). The racial makeup of the county was 97.65% White, 1.24% Black or African American, 0.21% Native American, 0.18% Asian, 0.11% from other races, and 0.60% from two or more races. 0.57% of the population were Hispanic or Latino of any race.

There were 4,304 households, out of which 32.80% had children under the age of 18 living with them, 61.70% were married couples living together, 9.90% had a female householder with no husband present, and 24.20% were non-families. 20.80% of all households were made up of individuals, and 7.80% had someone living alone who was 65 years of age or older. The average household size was 2.55 and the average family size was 2.94.

In the county, the population was spread out, with 25.10% under the age of 18, 8.10% from 18 to 24, 28.90% from 25 to 44, 26.30% from 45 to 64, and 11.50% who were 65 years of age or older. The median age was 37 years. For every 100 females there were 100.00 males. For every 100 females age 18 and over, there were 97.30 males.

The median income for a household in the county was $29,354, and the median income for a family was $34,114. Males had a median income of $29,521 versus $20,419 for females. The per capita income for the county was $14,551. About 15.80% of families and 18.30% of the population were below the poverty line, including 23.50% of those under age 18 and 14.60% of those age 65 or over.

== Transportation ==
State Routes within Meigs County, Tennessee
State Route 58	The principal north–south highway, runs the entire length of the county dividing the county down the middle. The only link via the Hiwassee River Bridge to the southernmost part of the county.
State Route 30	The principal east–west highway. This highway divides the county into north and south and intersects Highway 58 in Decatur. The Tennessee Department of Transportation is in the process of upgrading Highway 30 from a 2-lane highway to a 4-lane divided highway. allowing for more major east–west traffic and faster connection to Interstate 75. (Note: The section from Decatur eastward was finished in 2008.)
State Route 68	A north–south main highway for the county, that actually runs east/west through the northern county. This highway crosses the Tennessee River at Watts Bar Dam.
State Route 60	A principal north–south highway forming the southern border of the county.
State Route 304	An important local road, mainly for local residents that live off of the highway, and its northern portions allows access to Watts Bar Lake's many marinas, resorts, and campgrounds. Also connects the unincorporated community of Ten Mile with the county seat of Decatur.
State Route 305	An important local road, connecting Interstate 75 with Tennessee State Route 68 and Tennessee State Route 58. This also connects the north-central part of the county with the neighboring city of Athens in McMinn County.
State Route 306	A secondary state highway in the southeast portion of the county connecting Highway 58 to Charleston and Cleveland.

== Communities ==
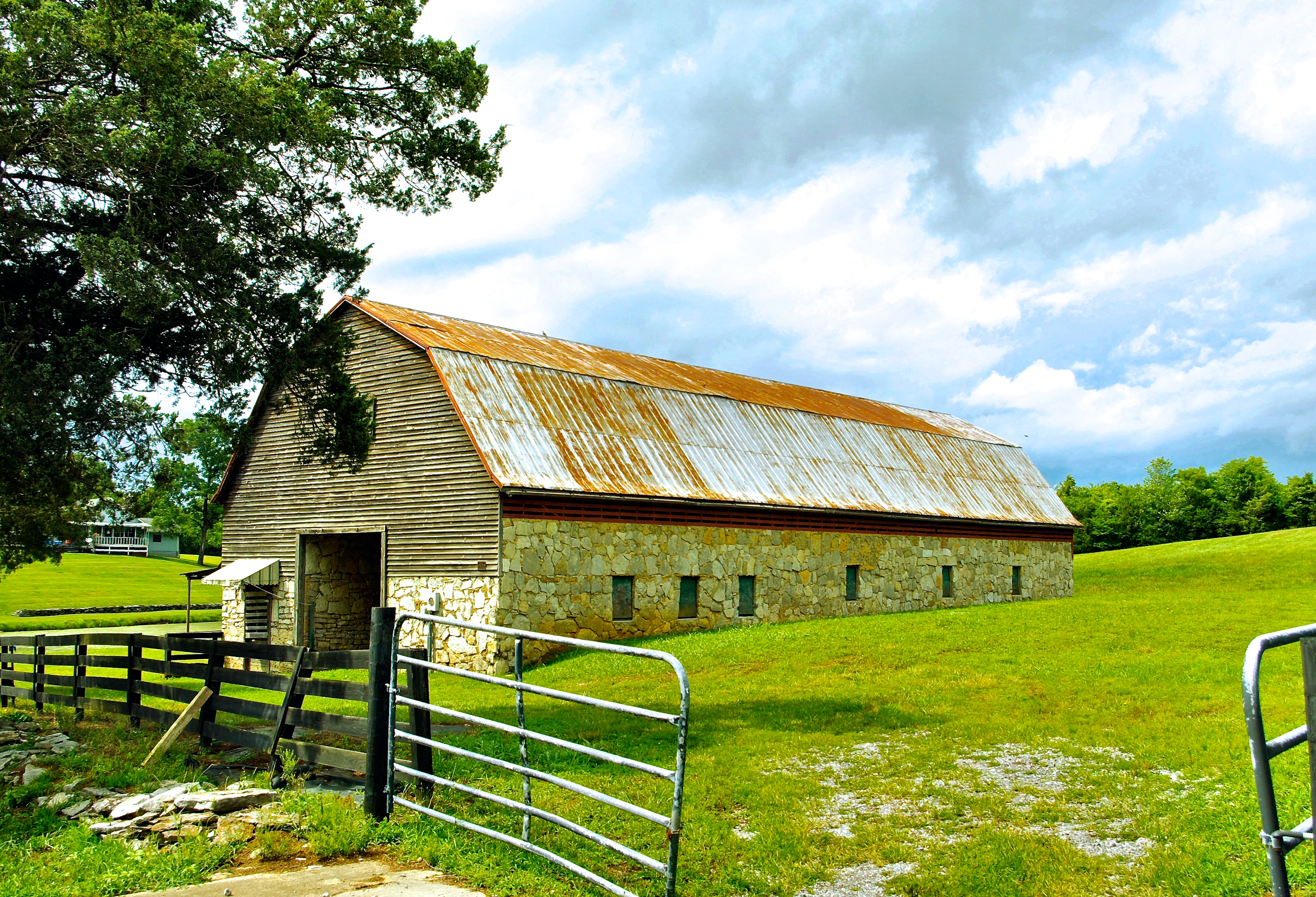
The 1930s-era Bradford Rymer Barn in Georgetown

=== Town ===
- Decatur (county seat)

=== Unincorporated communities ===
- Big Spring
- Birchwood (partial)
- Euchee
- Georgetown (partial)
- Ten Mile (partial)

=== Ghost town ===
- Cute

== Politics ==
Meigs County, like all of Tennessee outside Nashville and the extreme southwest, is presently overwhelmingly Republican. However, unlike most of East Tennessee, it has not voted consistently Republican since the Civil War. Being one of only two counties in East Tennessee to support a Secession Convention in February 1861, Meigs was a Democratic-leaning swing county – one of the few in the intensely partisan Tennessee of this era – up to the 1950s. The last Democrat to carry Meigs County was Bill Clinton in 1996, although the only Democrat to win a majority since 1952 has been Jimmy Carter in 1976.

United States presidential election results for Meigs County, Tennessee
Year	Republican		Democratic		Third party(ies)	
Year	No.	%	No.	%	No.	%
1880	395	39.42%	607	60.58%	0	0.00%
1884	524	43.31%	679	56.12%	7	0.58%
1888	589	44.02%	740	55.31%	9	0.67%
1892	561	44.52%	564	44.76%	135	10.71%
1896	641	46.86%	721	52.70%	6	0.44%
1900	619	46.65%	701	52.83%	7	0.53%
1904	481	45.16%	563	52.86%	21	1.97%
1908	457	49.41%	464	50.16%	4	0.43%
1912	337	33.10%	517	50.79%	164	16.11%
1916	608	52.87%	541	47.04%	1	0.09%
1920	915	56.24%	712	43.76%	0	0.00%
1924	657	52.77%	574	46.10%	14	1.12%
1928	719	54.97%	589	45.03%	0	0.00%
1932	564	40.06%	840	59.66%	4	0.28%
1936	740	42.36%	994	56.90%	13	0.74%
1940	573	39.19%	889	60.81%	0	0.00%
1944	532	42.26%	727	57.74%	0	0.00%
1948	748	47.04%	788	49.56%	54	3.40%
1952	850	52.31%	754	46.40%	21	1.29%
1956	847	51.93%	759	46.54%	25	1.53%
1960	901	56.14%	691	43.05%	13	0.81%
1964	824	50.24%	816	49.76%	0	0.00%
1968	729	43.81%	493	29.63%	442	26.56%
1972	1,052	64.34%	539	32.97%	44	2.69%
1976	975	43.49%	1,254	55.93%	13	0.58%
1980	1,278	55.18%	999	43.13%	39	1.68%
1984	1,575	60.53%	1,012	38.89%	15	0.58%
1988	1,507	58.68%	1,048	40.81%	13	0.51%
1992	1,355	38.89%	1,673	48.02%	456	13.09%
1996	1,228	41.37%	1,476	49.73%	264	8.89%
2000	1,797	53.01%	1,555	45.87%	38	1.12%
2004	2,500	60.50%	1,595	38.60%	37	0.90%
2008	2,797	66.01%	1,372	32.38%	68	1.60%
2012	2,734	68.97%	1,163	29.34%	67	1.69%
2016	3,342	77.36%	856	19.81%	122	2.82%
2020	4,467	80.75%	1,008	18.22%	57	1.03%
2024	5,085	83.37%	968	15.87%	46	0.75%

== See also ==
- National Register of Historic Places listings in Meigs County, Tennessee
