= Ten Mile, Tennessee =

Unincorporated community in Tennessee, US

Coordinates: 35.666°N 84.664°W

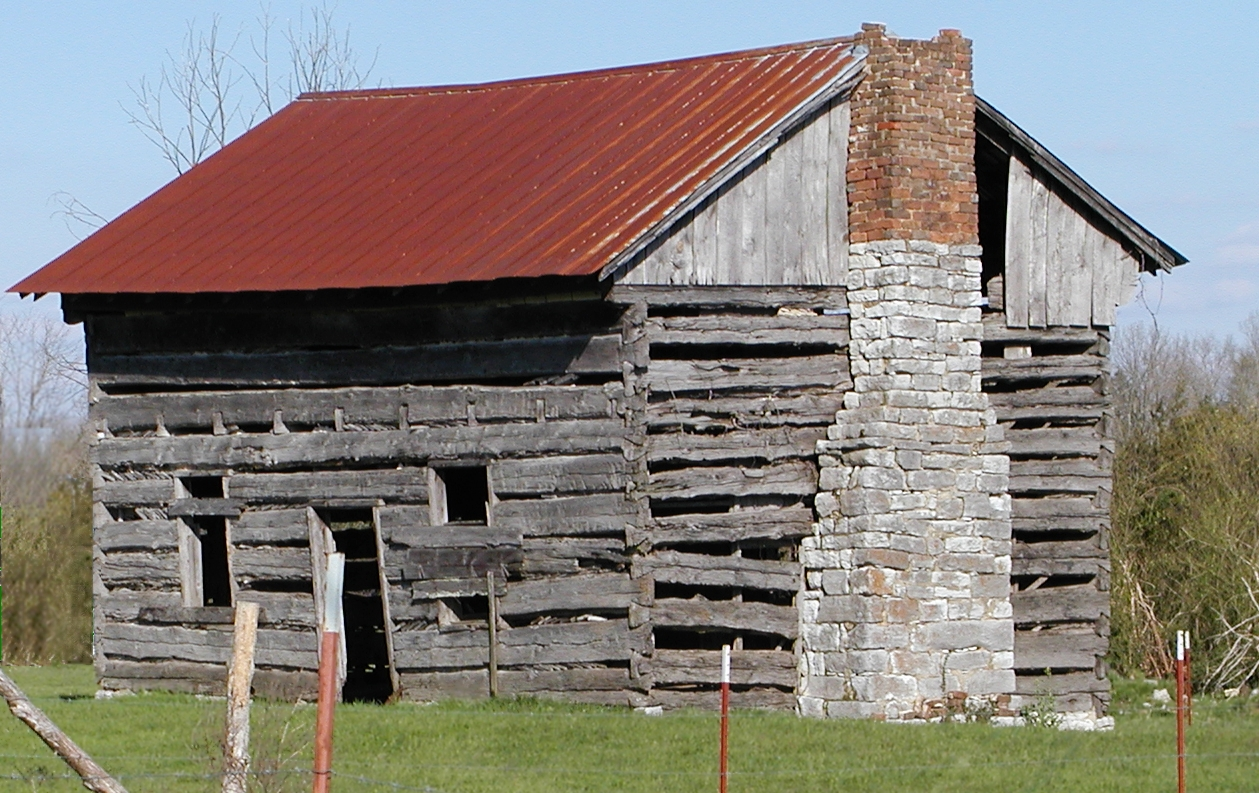
Log barn near Ten Mile

Ten Mile is an unincorporated community in northern Meigs and southeastern Roane counties in the U.S. state of Tennessee.

Ten Mile is primarily a summer cottage community on Watts Bar Lake. It includes summer cottages, small locally owned stores and restaurants, a bank, marinas, resorts, churches, and a post office (ZIP code 37880). The nearby TVA Watts Bar nuclear plant (in bordering Rhea County), and Watts Bar Dam spanning the Tennessee River across the Meigs County and Rhea County lines have played, and continue to play, an important role in the local economy.

Ten Mile originated in a small community at the cross of Old Ten Mile and Ten Mile roads, which is next to Ten Mile Creek. The community consisted of a small school, a post office and two churches. The town has now moved closer to Watts Bar Lake. The only things that still exist in the old community are the two churches.

The Ten Mile community is named after the stream flowing through it, Ten Mile Creek. Although there are no definitive archives to specifically document who named the stream Ten Mile Creek or why, based on early maps of the area, the best educated guess is that the length of the creek measures approximately 10 miles.

The Ten Mile zip code 37880 had a 2020 population of 3477.

== Historic house ==
The Elisha Sharp House was added to the National Register of Historic Places on July 6, 1982.
