= Decatur, Tennessee =

- Town
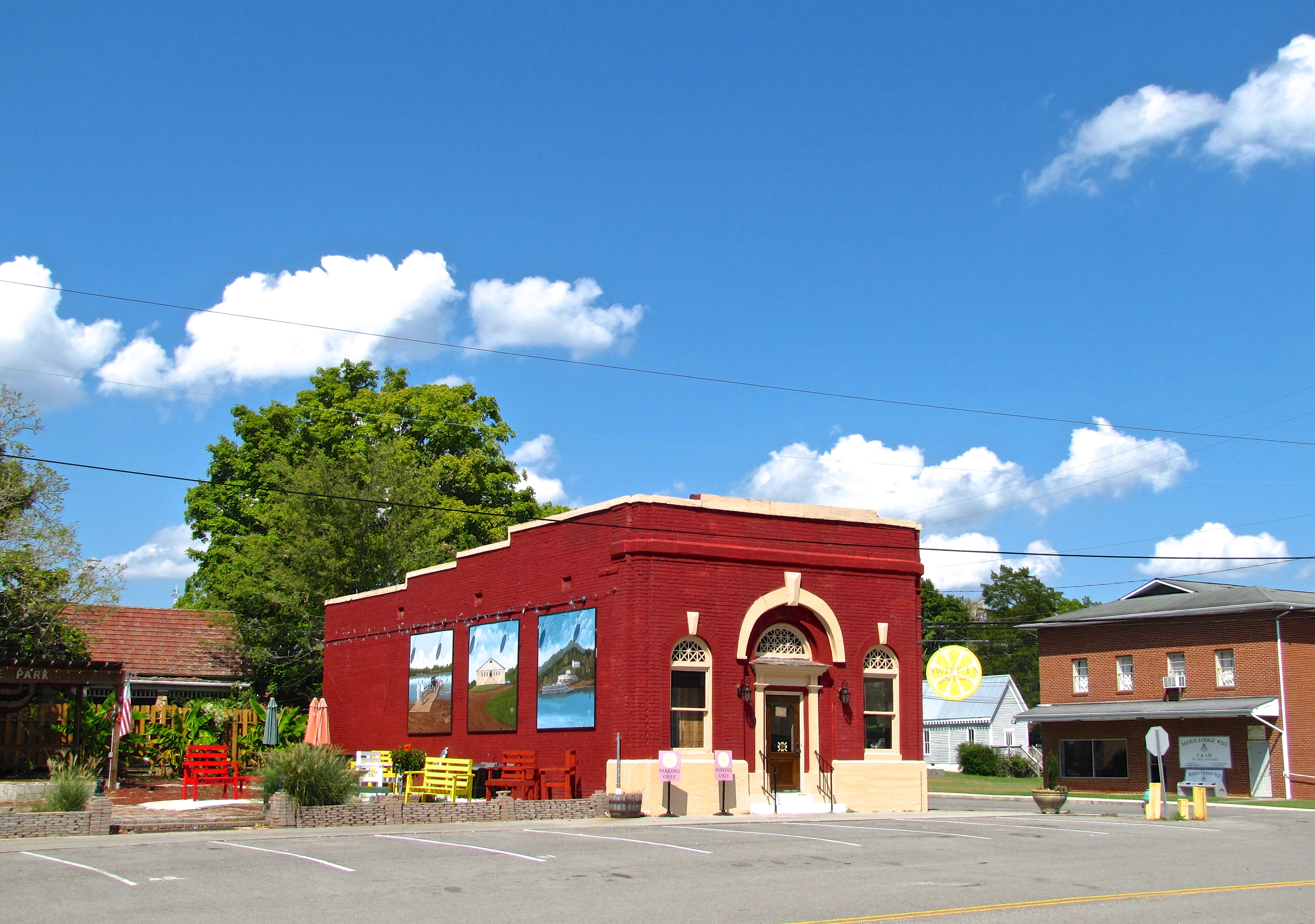

- Location of Decatur in Meigs County, Tennessee.
- Coordinates: 35°31′8″N 84°47′36″W
- Country: United States
- State: Tennessee
- County: Meigs
- Founded: 1836
- Incorporated: 1838
- Named for: Stephen Decatur

Government
  - Mayor: John Wayne Irwin

Area
  - Total: 3.80 sq mi (9.83 km^{2})
  - Land: 3.80 sq mi (9.83 km^{2})
  - Water: 0 sq mi (0.00 km^{2})
- Elevation: 778 ft (237 m)

Population (2020)
  - Total: 1,563
  - Density: 411.8/sq mi (158.99/km^{2})
- Time zone: UTC-5 (Eastern (EST))
  - Summer (DST): UTC-4 (EDT)
- ZIP code: 37322
- Area code: 423
- FIPS code: 47-19880
- GNIS feature ID: 1306311
- Website: www.decaturtn.net

Decatur (/dɪˈkeɪtər/ dih-KAY-tər) is a town in Meigs County, Tennessee, United States. The population was 1,563 at the 2020 census. It is the county seat of Meigs County.

== History ==
Decatur was founded in May 1836 as a county seat for Meigs County, which had been formed that same year. The initial 50 acres (0.20 km^{2}) for the town were donated by James Lillard and Leonard Brooks. Decatur is named after Commodore Stephen Decatur Jr., an early 19th-century American naval officer renowned for his exploits in the First Barbary War, the Second Barbary War, and the War of 1812.

== Geography ==
Decatur is located at 35°31′8″N 84°47′36″W (35.518871, -84.793201). The town is situated at the western base of No Pone Ridge, an elongate ridge characteristic of the Appalachian Ridge-and-Valley Province. Just west of Decatur, the Tennessee River flows around a blunt peninsula known as Armstrong Bend. This section of the river is part of Chickamauga Lake.

Decatur is situated around the junction of Tennessee State Route 30, which connects the town to Athens to the east and Dayton to the west, and Tennessee State Route 58, which connects Decatur to Kingston to the north and Chattanooga to the south. Interstate 75 passes approximately 15 miles (24 km) east of Decatur.

According to the United States Census Bureau, the town has a total area of 2.6 square miles (6.7 km^{2}), all of it land.

== Demographics ==
Historical population
Census	Pop.	Note	%±
1870	99		—
1880	175		76.8%
1890	313		78.9%
1910	165		—
1920	142		−13.9%
1930	158		11.3%
1940	205		29.7%
1950	235		14.6%
1960	681		189.8%
1970	698		2.5%
1980	1,069		53.2%
1990	1,361		27.3%
2000	1,395		2.5%
2010	1,598		14.6%
2020	1,563		−2.2%

=== 2020 census ===
Decatur racial composition
Race	Number	Percentage
White (non-Hispanic)	1,429	91.43%
Black or African American (non-Hispanic)	30	1.92%
Native American	11	0.7%
Asian	4	0.26%
Other/Mixed	69	4.41%
Hispanic or Latino	20	1.28%

As of the 2020 United States census, there were 1,563 people, 586 households, and 416 families residing in the town.

=== 2000 census ===
As of the census of 2000, there were 1,395 people, 560 households, and 366 families residing in the town. The population density was 545.1 inhabitants per square mile (210.5/km^{2}). There were 598 housing units at an average density of 233.7 units per square mile (90.2 units/km^{2}). The racial makeup of the town was 98.14% White, 0.93% African American, 0.14% Native American, 0.29% Asian, 0.07% from other races, and 0.43% from two or more races. Hispanic or Latino of any race were 0.29% of the population.

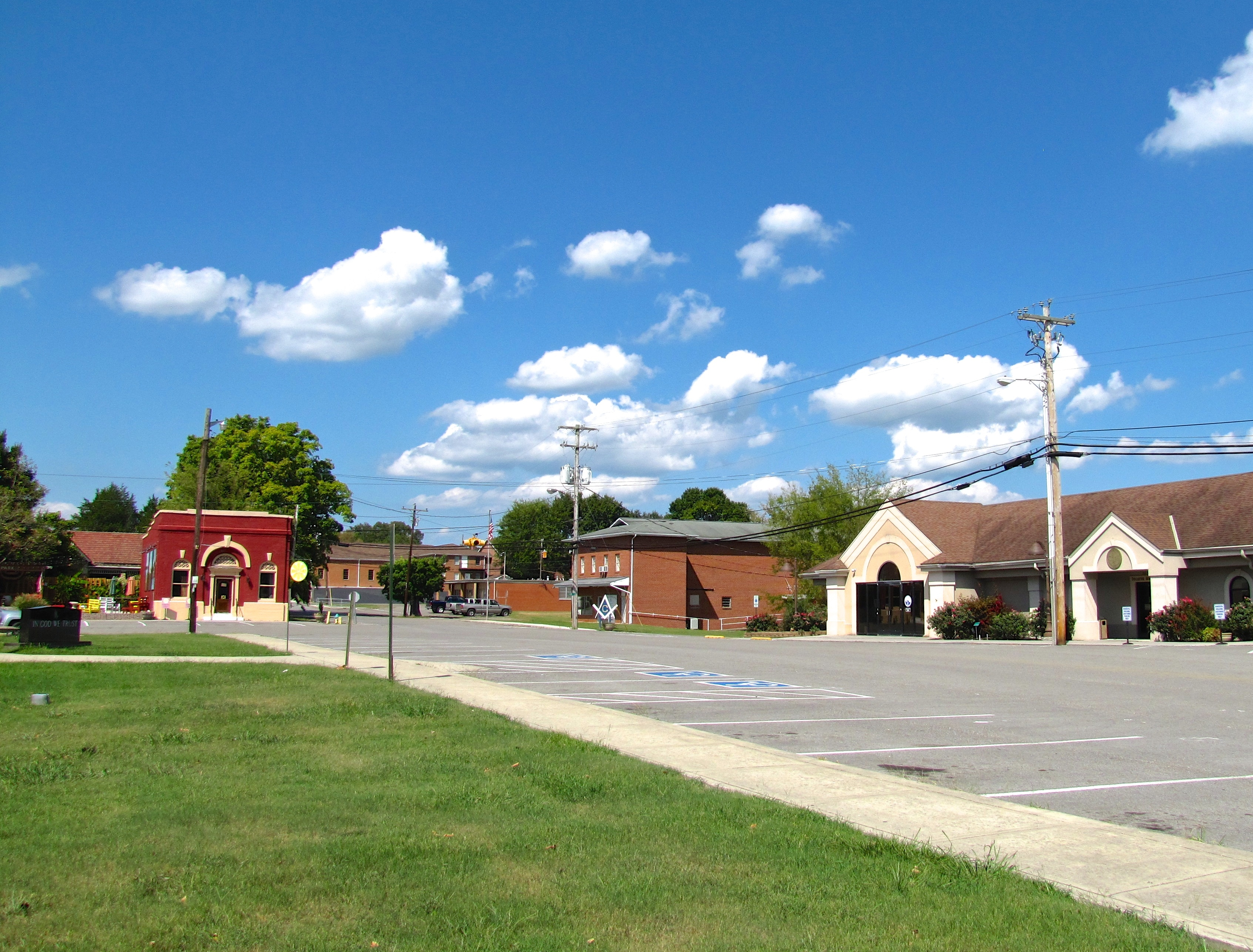
Main Street

There were 560 households, out of which 28.8% had children under the age of 18 living with them, 49.1% were married couples living together, 12.5% had a female householder with no husband present, and 34.5% were non-families. 30.9% of all households were made up of individuals, and 13.8% had someone living alone who was 65 years of age or older. The average household size was 2.29 and the average family size was 2.83.

In the town, the population was spread out, with 21.5% under the age of 18, 7.9% from 18 to 24, 29.2% from 25 to 44, 23.8% from 45 to 64, and 17.6% who were 65 years of age or older. The median age was 39 years. For every 100 females, there were 92.1 males. For every 100 females age 18 and over, there were 88.5 males.

The median income for a household in the town was $29,402, and the median income for a family was $38,375. Males had a median income of $29,327 versus $22,647 for females. The per capita income for the town was $18,784. About 12.9% of families and 15.1% of the population were below the poverty line, including 16.8% of those under age 18 and 12.5% of those age 65 or over.
