= Ohio State Route 155 =

State highway in Perry County, Ohio, US

State Route 155

Route information
- Maintained by ODOT
- Length: 7.45 mi (11.99 km)
- Existed: 1927–present

Major junctions
- West end: SR 93 in Shawnee
- East end: SR 13 in Corning

Location
- Country: United States
- State: Ohio
- Counties: Perry

Highway system
- Ohio State Highway System; Interstate; US; State; Scenic
← SR 154	→ SR 156

State Route 155 (SR 155) is an east–west state highway in the southeastern portion of the U.S. state of Ohio. The highway's western terminus is at SR 93 in Shawnee. At its midpoint in Hemlock the highway is known as Sanders Street. The highway’s eastern terminus is at a four-way stop intersection with SR 13 in Corning.

Established in the late 1920s, SR 155 serves as a connector route in southern Perry County. The two-lane route links the Village of Shawnee to the Village of Corning, at about the highways midpoint it passes through the Village of Hemlock and is known as Sanders Street. The entirety of SR 155 passes through Wayne National Forest.

== Route description ==
The entirety of SR 155 is located in the southern portion of Perry County. This route is not a part of the National Highway System.

State Route 155 begins at a four-way stop intersection in Shawnee where SR 93 forms the southern and western legs. Going east from that intersection, woods bound the highway to the south, while Shawnee's Main Street runs parallel to the state route immediately to the north, with the main portion of the village on the north side of Main Street. State Route 155 curves northeast and then starts to bend to the southeast, at which point Main Street converges with the highway. Thereafter, the state route intersects New England Hill Road, then rounds out curving to the southeast. Departing Shawnee, State Route 155 enters into Salt Lick Township and the Wayne National Forest. As such, the majority of the highway is bounded by forest on both sides, with some open space appearing from time to time. The highway trends generally east-southeast and then east, before reaching the Sulphur Springs Road intersection. Now bending to the southeast, the route passes a few houses prior to passing into Hemlock. Known as Sanders Street through the village, State Route 155 passes both woods and houses, and intersects Main Street before curving east.

The highway turns to the northeast as it departs Hemlock and crosses into Monroe Township. Bending back to the east, State Route 155 passes by Miller Junior and Senior High Schools. The route runs east-northeasterly through a pair of hamlets, passing both woods and residences as it goes through intersections with Township Road 378, Indian Run Road and the western Scenic Road intersection, at which point SR 155 turns to the southeast. The route bends back to the east-northeast at the eastern Scenic Road intersection. Open space blends in with the woods and occasional houses as State Route 155 passes intersections with Congo Road and Township Road 283. Then, after curving due east, the highway meets Millertown Road, and turns to the north. After bending back to the northeast, SR 155 passes amidst more woods and intersects Township Road 331 before entering the village of Corning. The highway becomes known as Main Street, and passes a few homes before bending to the east, and encountering a four-way stop intersection at Valley Street. After passing amidst the central business district of Corning, SR 155 crosses a set of Norfolk Southern railroad tracks, and then immediately encounters SR 13 at a four-way stop intersection with flashing beacon, at which point the route comes to an end.

== History ==
SR 155 was designated in 1927. The highway replaced what was a portion of SR 216 before that highway was truncated to New Straitsville. The segment of SR 216 between New Straitsville and Shawnee, which was routed concurrently with what was then SR 75 (now SR 93), became just State Route 75, while the portion running between Shawnee and Corning was re-designated as SR 155. The highway has not experienced any changes in its routing since its inception.

== Major intersections ==
The entire route is in Perry County.

Location	mi	km	Destinations	Notes
Shawnee	0.00	0.00	SR 93 / 2nd Street	
Corning	7.45	11.99	SR 13 (Jefferson Street) / Main Street – New Lexington, Glouster	
1.000 mi = 1.609 km; 1.000 km = 0.621 mi
