= Ohio State Route 216 =

State highway in southeastern Ohio, US

State Route 216

Route information
- Maintained by ODOT
- Length: 6.56 mi (10.56 km)
- Existed: 1924–present

Major junctions
- South end: SR 78 in Murray City
- North end: SR 93 in New Straitsville

Location
- Country: United States
- State: Ohio
- Counties: Hocking, Perry

Highway system
- Ohio State Highway System; Interstate; US; State; Scenic
← SR 215	→ SR 217

State Route 216 (SR 216) is a north–south state highway in the southeastern quadrant of the U.S. state of Ohio. The southern terminus of SR 216 is at a three-way stop T-intersection with SR 78 in Murray City. SR 216's northern terminus is also at a three-way stop T-intersection, this time with SR 93 in New Straitsville.

Established in the mid-1920s, SR 216 traverses heavily wooded terrain as it connects the villages of Murray City and New Straitsville. When it first appeared, SR 216 extended south to Nelsonville and north and east to Shawnee and Corning.

== Route description ==
SR 216 runs through the far eastern end of Hocking County and the extreme southern end of Perry County. The route is not inclusive as a portion of the National Highway System.

The state highway begins at a three-way stop T-intersection with SR 78 in the village of Murray City, just west of the Hocking-Athens County Line. Known as Locust Street, SR 216 runs northerly a short distance through a residential area before departing the village, and entering into rural Ward Township. The highway travels through a predominantly forested landscape, passing the occasional house along the way. The highway heads northerly out of Murray City, then starts to bend to the northwest as it passes successive intersections with Township Road 21 and Spencer Hollow Road. Weaving its way in a northwesterly fashion through the woods, SR 216 crosses into Perry County.

Entering into Coal Township, Perry County, the highway bends to the north as it meets Township Road 434, then curves to the west prior to meeting Township Road 437 and entering New Straitsville. Turning to the northwest inside of the village limits, SR 216, which is also known as Main Street, passes a blend of woods and homes. After meeting Newark Street, the route enters a more solidly residential vicinity. The highway arrives at its junction with SR 595, a T-intersection that marks the intersecting state highway's northern terminus. Less than two blocks to the northwest of intersecting SR 595, after entering the downtown of the village, SR 216 comes to an end as it meets SR 93.

== History ==
Created in 1924, SR 216 originally consisted of the following current routes: SR 78 from Nelsonville north to Murray City, the entirety of today's SR 216 from Murray City northwest to New Straitsville, an overlap of SR 93 (formerly SR 75) from New Straitsville north to Shawnee, and SR 155 from Shawnee east to Corning.

The route was first trimmed in 1927, when the route was truncated on the north side to end at then SR 75 (current SR 93) in New Straitsville. The portion that overlapped SR 75 from New Straitsville to Shawnee became just SR 75, while the part from Shawnee to Corning was assigned the designation of SR 155. Then, in 1971, SR 216 took on its current form when the south end of the highway was moved from Nelsonville to Murray City, as an extension of SR 78 replaced SR 216 between those two cities.

== Major intersections ==
County	Location	mi	km	Destinations	Notes
Hocking	Murray City	0.00	0.00	SR 78 (Corning Street / Locust Street) – Glouster	
Perry	New Straitsville	6.44	10.36	SR 595 south (Plummer Hill Road)	Northern terminus of SR 595
Perry	New Straitsville	6.56	10.56	SR 93 (Clark Street / Main Street)	
1.000 mi = 1.609 km; 1.000 km = 0.621 mi
