= Moxahala =

Moxahala may refer to:

- Moxahala, Ohio, unincorporated community in Ohio, United States
- Moxahala Park, Ohio, unincorporated community in Ohio, United States
- Moxahala Creek, a tributary of the Muskingum River, in southeastern Ohio in the United States
