= Salt Lick Township, Perry County, Ohio =

Township in Ohio, US

- Township
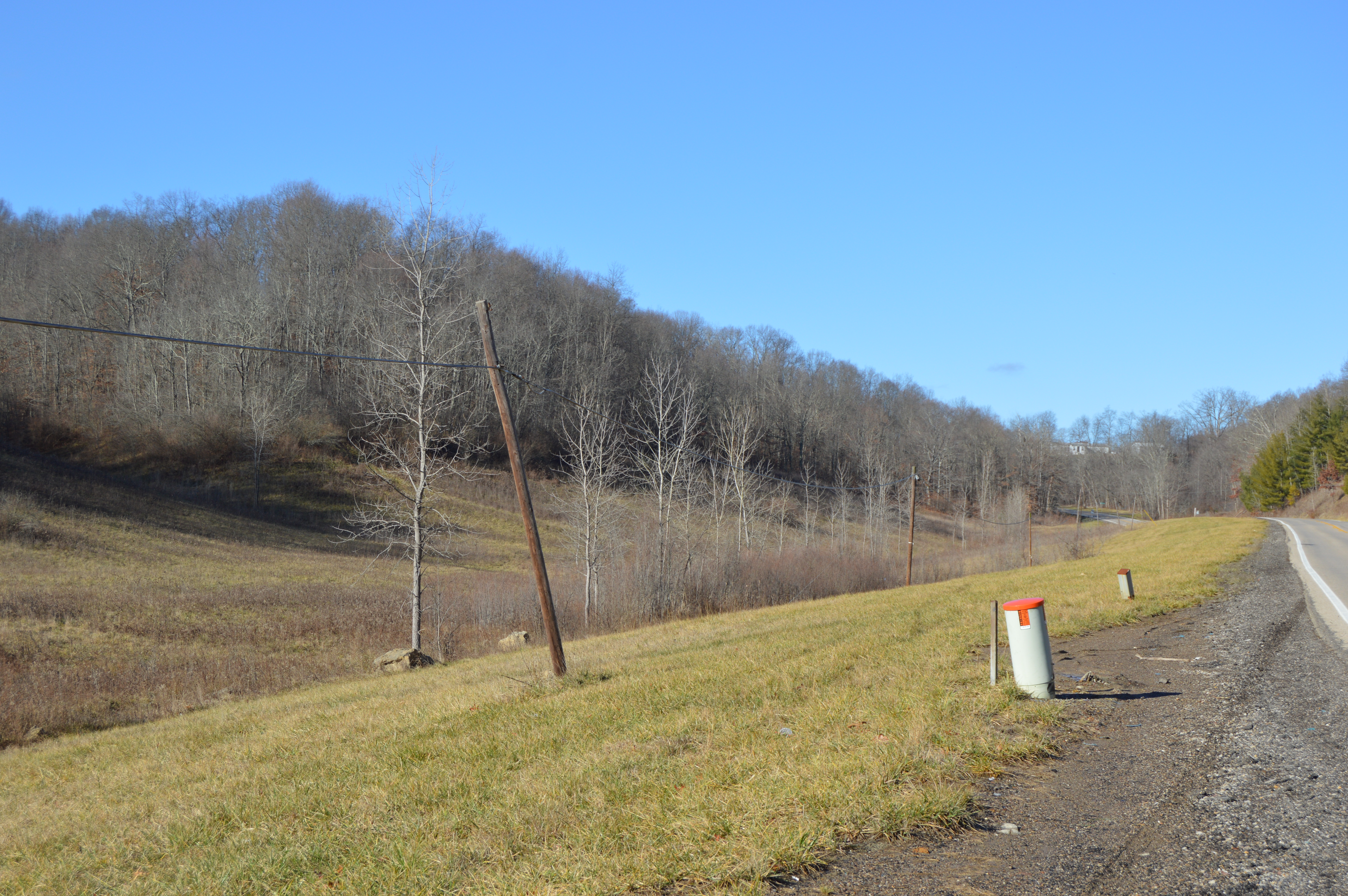
- Along State Route 155 between Hemlock and Shanwee

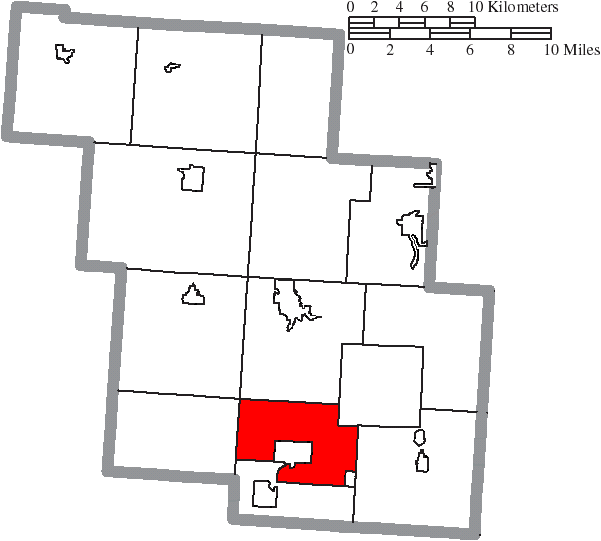
- Location of Salt Lick Township in Perry County
- Coordinates: 39°36′32″N 82°12′6″W
- Country: United States
- State: Ohio
- County: Perry

Area
  - Total: 20.7 sq mi (53.6 km^{2})
  - Land: 20.7 sq mi (53.5 km^{2})
  - Water: 0.039 sq mi (0.1 km^{2})
- Elevation: 942 ft (287 m)

Population (2020)
  - Total: 1,090
  - Density: 53/sq mi (20.4/km^{2})
- Time zone: UTC-5 (Eastern (EST))
  - Summer (DST): UTC-4 (EDT)
- FIPS code: 39-70226
- GNIS feature ID: 1086790

Salt Lick Township is one of the fourteen townships of Perry County, Ohio, United States. The 2020 census found 1,090 people in the township.

== Geography ==
Located in the southern part of the county, it borders the following townships:

- Pike Township - north
- Pleasant Township - northeast
- Monroe Township - east
- Coal Township - south
- Monday Creek Township - west
- Jackson Township - northwest corner

Two villages are located in Salt Lick Township: Shawnee in its center, and Hemlock in its southeast corner. The unincorporated communities of McCuneville are in its northwest, while Ludington is located just northwest of Hemlock.

== Name and history ==
Salt Lick Township was organized around 1823, and named for the mineral licks within its borders. It is the only Salt Lick Township statewide.

== Government ==
The township is governed by a three-member board of trustees, who are elected in November of odd-numbered years to a four-year term beginning on the following January 1. Two are elected in the year after the presidential election and one is elected in the year before it. There is also an elected township fiscal officer, who serves a four-year term beginning on April 1 of the year after the election, which is held in November of the year before the presidential election. Vacancies in the fiscal officership or on the board of trustees are filled by the remaining trustees.
