= Sego =

Sego may refer to:

- UR-100, a Soviet ICBM
- Ségo, a nickname in the French press for French politician and 2007 Socialist presidential candidate Ségolène Royal
- Sego lily, a plant native to the western United States
- Sego (diet drink), a discontinued diet drink introduced by Pet Milk in 1961
- Sego, Ohio, an unincorporated community
- Sego, Utah, a ghost town in the United States
- Robert Sego, American politician from Missouri

== See also ==
- Sego Lily (disambiguation)
