= Coal Township, Ohio =

Coal Township, Ohio may refer to:

- Coal Township, Jackson County, Ohio
- Coal Township, Perry County, Ohio
