= National Register of Historic Places listings in Perry County, Ohio =

Location of Perry County in Ohio

This is a list of the National Register of Historic Places listings in Perry County, Ohio.

This is intended to be a complete list of the properties and districts on the National Register of Historic Places in Perry County, Ohio, United States. The locations of National Register properties and districts for which the latitude and longitude coordinates are included below, may be seen in an online map.

There are 15 properties and districts listed on the National Register in the county.

This National Park Service list is complete through NPS recent listings posted March 20, 2026.

== Current listings ==
	Name on the Register	Image	Date listed	Location	City or town	Description
1	Bowman Mill Covered Bridge	Bowman Mill Covered Bridge	February 8, 1978 (#78002169)	Perry County Fairgrounds; 39°43′15″N 82°13′27″W	Pike Township	Originally located south of New Reading on Winegardner Rd.; moved to the fairgrounds in 1987
2	Glenford Bank	Glenford Bank	March 9, 1990 (#90000389)	Main and Broad Sts. 39°53′18″N 82°19′05″W	Glenford	
3	Glenford Fort	Glenford Fort	October 26, 1971 (#71000649)	Along Jonathan's Creek south of Glenford; 39°52′30″N 82°19′00″W	Hopewell Township	
4	Ludowici Roof Tile Company Historic District	Ludowici Roof Tile Company Historic District	February 11, 2021 (#100006136)	4757 Tile Plant Rd. 39°43′18″N 82°14′29″W	New Lexington	Factory and manufacturing site of the Ludowici Roof Tile company, in operation at this site since 1902
5	Randolph Mitchell House	Randolph Mitchell House	December 8, 1978 (#78002170)	Rush Creek Rd. in New Reading; 39°48′36″N 82°21′12″W	Reading Township	
6	New Straitsville School	New Straitsville School	June 8, 2001 (#01000590)	402 Clark St. 39°34′57″N 82°14′03″W	New Straitsville	
7	Parks Covered Bridge	Parks Covered Bridge	September 10, 1974 (#74001590)	North of Somerset on County Road 33, south of Chalfunts; 39°51′09″N 82°16′45″W	Hopewell Township	
8	Perry County Courthouse and Jail	Perry County Courthouse and Jail	October 8, 1981 (#81000449)	Main and Brown Sts. 39°42′50″N 82°12′30″W	New Lexington	
9	Roseville High School		March 23, 2026 (#100012851)	76 W. Athens Road; 39°48′01″N 82°04′32″W	Roseville	Now the middle school.
10	Saint Joseph's Catholic Church	Saint Joseph's Catholic Church	August 7, 1986 (#86002267)	5757 State Route 383, southeast of Somerset; 39°46′39″N 82°16′37″W	Reading Township	
11	Shawnee Historic District	Shawnee Historic District	March 17, 1976 (#76001507)	Both sides of Main St., 2nd St. to Walnut St. 39°36′14″N 82°12′40″W	Shawnee	
12	Sheridan House	Sheridan House	November 28, 1980 (#80003208)	S. Columbus St. 39°47′57″N 82°17′33″W	Somerset	
13	Somerset Historic District	Somerset Historic District	September 5, 1975 (#75001516)	Main St. from High St. to properties facing Market Sq; Columbus St. from junction with Sheridan and Gay Sts. 39°48′25″N 82°18′02″W	Somerset	Includes the Old Perry County Courthouse
14	West School	West School	April 10, 1980 (#80003207)	Off State Route 93; 39°46′16″N 82°06′11″W	Crooksville	
15	Soloman Whitmer House	Soloman Whitmer House	September 5, 1979 (#79001924)	North of Thornville at 13917 Zion Road, NW. 39°54′09″N 82°25′04″W	Thorn Township	

== See also ==
- List of National Historic Landmarks in Ohio
- Listings in neighboring counties: Athens, Fairfield, Hocking, Licking, Morgan, Muskingum
- National Register of Historic Places listings in Ohio
