= Ohio State Route 595 =

State highway in southeastern Ohio, US

State Route 595

Route information
- Maintained by ODOT
- Length: 9.18 mi (14.77 km)
- Existed: 1937–present

Major junctions
- South end: US 33 / CR 25 near Logan
- North end: SR 216 in New Straitsville

Location
- Country: United States
- State: Ohio
- Counties: Hocking, Perry

Highway system
- Ohio State Highway System; Interstate; US; State; Scenic
← SR 592	→ SR 596

State Route 595 (SR 595) is a north–south state highway in southeastern Ohio, a U.S. state. The route's southern terminus is at a diamond interchange with the U.S. Route 33 (US 33) expressway approximately three and a half miles (5.6 km) southeast of Logan. Its northern terminus is at a T-intersection with SR 216 in New Straitsville, just two blocks southeast of SR 216's northern terminus at SR 93.

== Route description ==
The state highway travels through the counties of Hocking and Perry along its way. No part of SR 595 is incorporated in the National Highway System.

== History ==
SR 595 was created in 1937 along the routing that it maintains to this day through eastern Hocking County and extreme southern Perry County. The highway has not experienced any major changes to alignment since it was established.

== Major intersections ==
County	Location	mi	km	Destinations	Notes
Hocking	Green Township	0.00– 0.29	0.00– 0.47	US 33 / CR 25 – Columbus, Athens	Interchange
Hocking	Green Township	3.03	4.88	SR 278 south	Northern terminus of SR 278
Perry	New Straitsville	9.18	14.77	SR 216 (Main Street)	
1.000 mi = 1.609 km; 1.000 km = 0.621 mi
