= Milligan, Ohio =

Unincorporated community in Ohio, U.S.

Coordinates: 39°43′40″N 82°06′07″W

Interactive map pinpointing Milligan

Milligan is a small unincorporated community in the northwest of Bearfield Township, Perry County, Ohio, United States. It is located on State Route 93 between Crooksville and New Lexington. The main roads in the community are Township Road 1194 and State Route 93.

== Temperature Record ==
Milligan's main significance lies in its being the location of the lowest recorded temperature in Ohio history, -39° Fahrenheit. This temperature was recorded at a United States Weather Bureau station on February 10, 1899, during the Great Blizzard of 1899, when the entire state experienced bitterly cold weather for over a week. It is believed that Milligan is so cold because of its location within the valley of the Moxahala Creek, into which cold air flows from the surrounding hills.

== History ==
A post office called Milligan was established in 1893 and remained in operation until 1902.
