= Monroe Township, Perry County, Ohio =

Township in Ohio, US

- Township
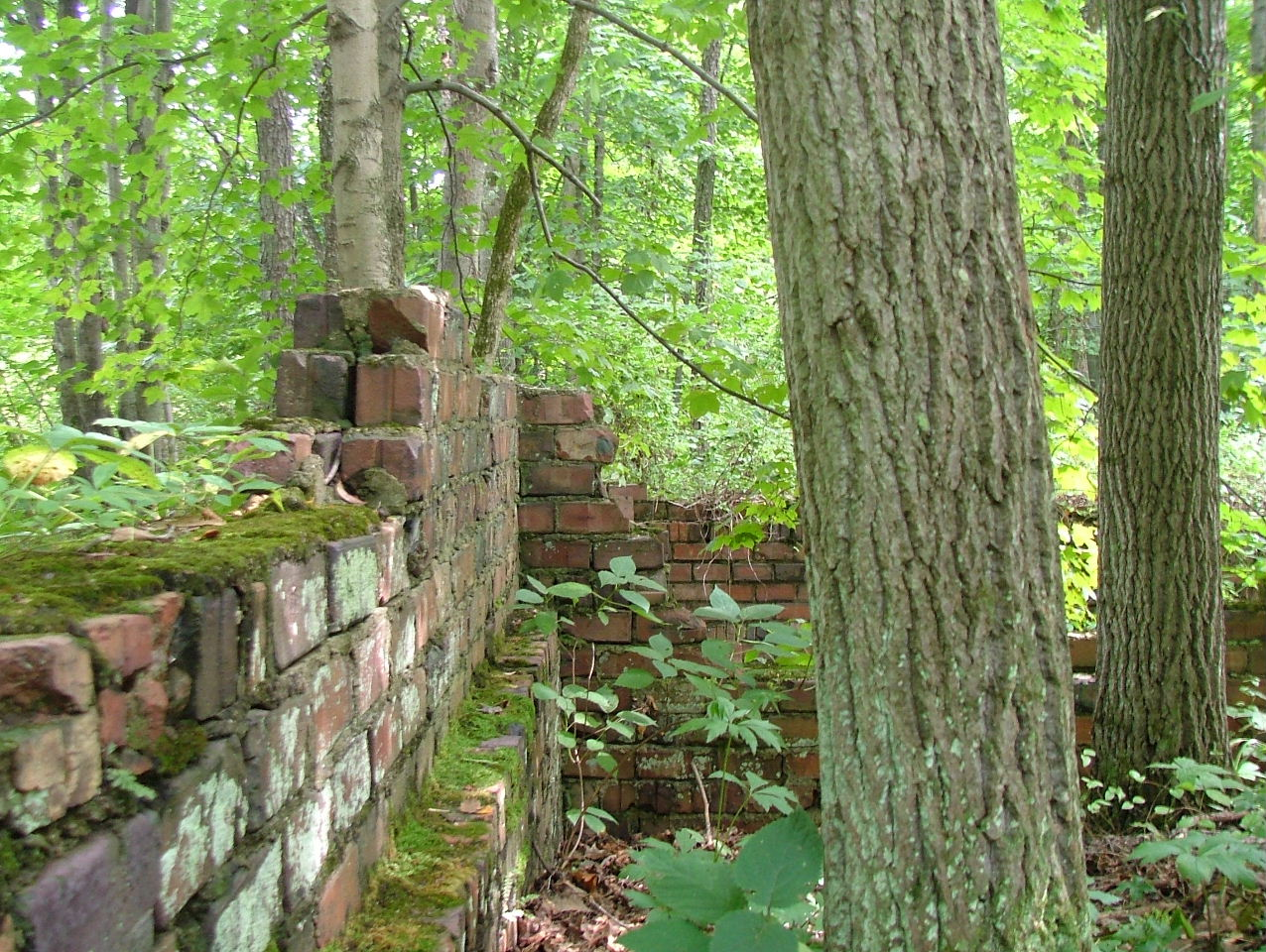
- Ruins at San Toy

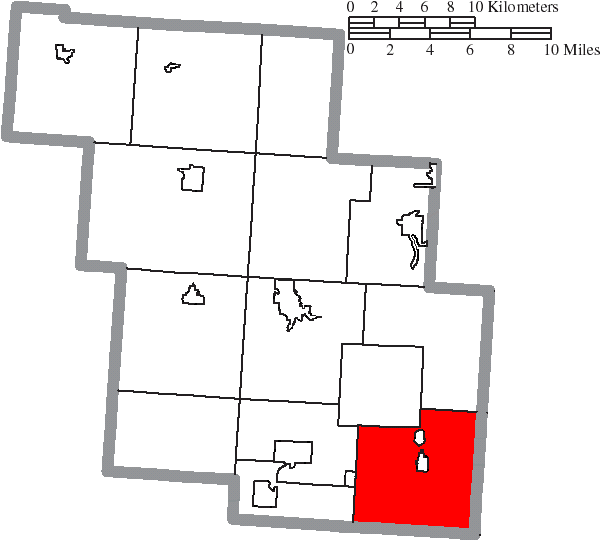
- Location of Monroe Township in Perry County
- Coordinates: 39°36′4″N 82°5′13″W
- Country: United States
- State: Ohio
- County: Perry

Area
  - Total: 33.6 sq mi (87.1 km^{2})
  - Land: 33.6 sq mi (86.9 km^{2})
  - Water: 0.077 sq mi (0.2 km^{2})
- Elevation: 745 ft (227 m)

Population (2020)
  - Total: 1,356
  - Density: 40/sq mi (15.6/km^{2})
- Time zone: UTC-5 (Eastern (EST))
  - Summer (DST): UTC-4 (EDT)
- FIPS code: 39-51520
- GNIS feature ID: 1086786

Monroe Township is one of the fourteen townships of Perry County, Ohio, United States. The 2020 census found 1,356 people in the township.

== Communities ==
- Corning is a village located at 39°36′17″N 82°5′17″W within the northern portion of the township.
- Rendville is a village located at 39°37′2″N 82°5′22″W within the northern portion of the township. The population was 36 at the 2010 census, making it the smallest incorporated community in Ohio.

== Geography ==
Located in the southeastern corner of the county, it borders the following townships:

- Bearfield Township - north
- Deerfield Township, Morgan County - northeast corner
- Union Township, Morgan County - east
- Homer Township, Morgan County - southeast corner
- Trimble Township, Athens County - south
- Coal Township - southwest
- Salt Lick Township - west
- Pleasant Township - northwest

== Name and history ==
Monroe Township was organized in 1823, and named for President James Monroe. It is one of twenty-two Monroe Townships statewide.

== Government ==
The township is governed by a three-member board of trustees, who are elected in November of odd-numbered years to a four-year term beginning on the following January 1. Two are elected in the year after the presidential election and one is elected in the year before it. There is also an elected township fiscal officer, who serves a four-year term beginning on April 1 of the year after the election, which is held in November of the year before the presidential election. Vacancies in the fiscal officership or on the board of trustees are filled by the remaining trustees.
