= West School (Crooksville, Ohio) =

- U.S. National Register of Historic Places
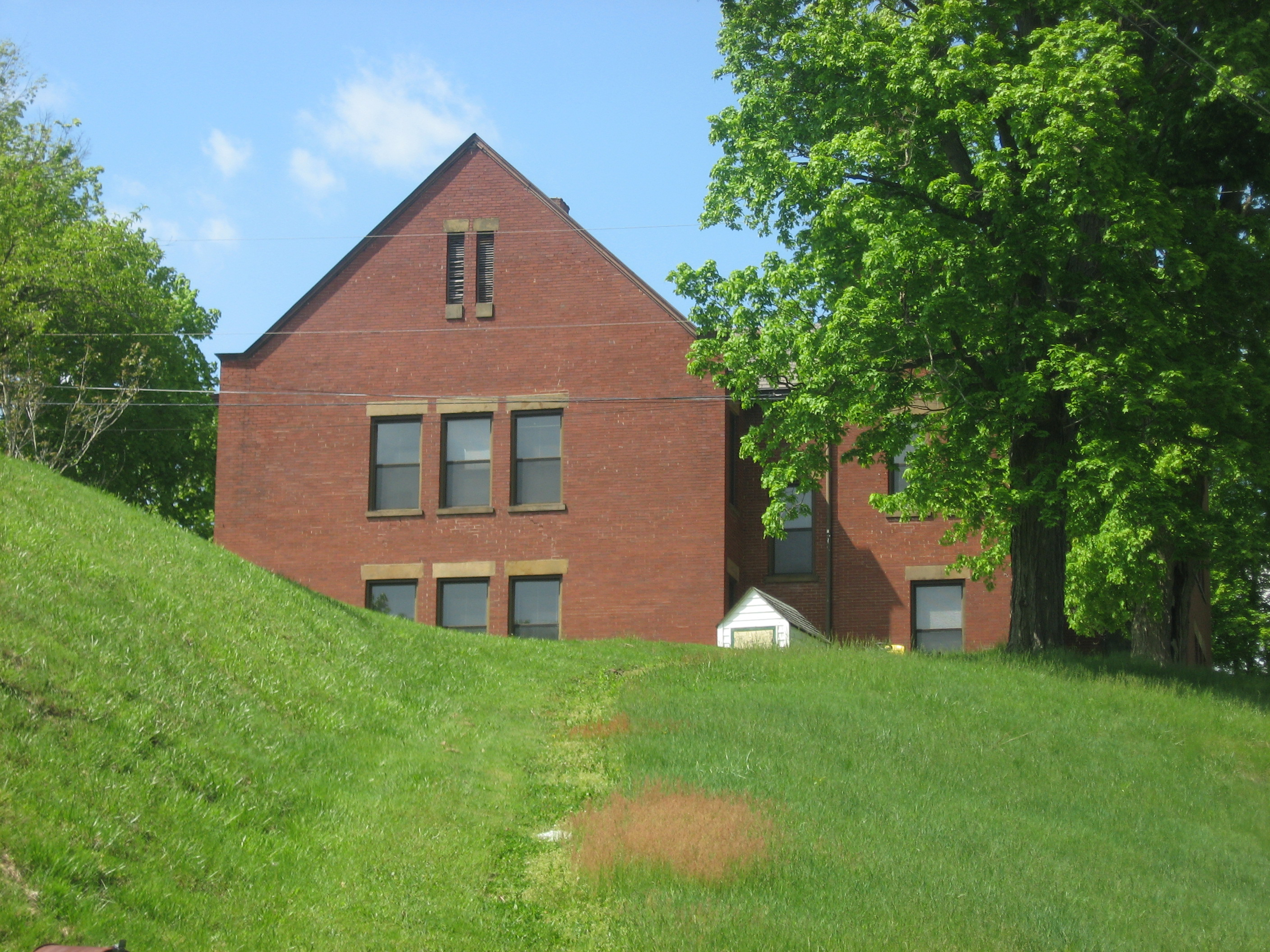
- Southern side

- Location within Ohio Location within the United States
- Interactive map showing the location of West School, Crooksville
- Location: Off Ohio State Route 93, Crooksville, Ohio
- Coordinates: 39°46′15″N 82°6′11″W
- Area: 1 acre (0.40 ha)
- Built: 1904
- NRHP reference No.: 80003207
- Added to NRHP: April 10, 1980

The West School is a historic former school in the village of Crooksville, Ohio, United States. Constructed during a period of significant growth in the community, it served local children for a comparatively short time before its sale for private use.

== History ==
Built in 1904, the West School is a relic of Crooksville's early prosperity. The village was founded in 1874 at a location rich in clay, and by the opening of the twentieth century, it was experiencing rapid growth and had become one of Perry County's most important communities. Much of this growth was the result of the clay: multiple pottery factories were established in Crooksville, and the population boomed, causing the village fathers to realize their need of improved educational facilities. Some years later, during the 1910s, the building ceased being exclusively a primary school, as village officials began using it for a new secondary school.

The West School remained in operation for only about 25 years. Petroleum was discovered in the vicinity of Crooksville in the 1920s, producing increases in the village's population and finances. Consequently, it was decided to erect a replacement facility, and in 1929, the West School was sold to the Oak Leaf Lodge #678 of the Knights of Pythias, who occupied it until 1978.

== Architecture ==
West School is primarily a brick building, as both its foundation and its walls are constructed of the material, although stone and metal elements are also present. Two and a half stories tall, the building features a prominent bell tower in one corner; the school's basic floor plan is that of the letter "L", and the tower sits in the elbow created by the intersection of the building's main portion and its ell. No specific architectural style can be deemed to include the West School.

== Preservation ==
In 1980, the West School was listed on the National Register of Historic Places, qualifying because of its significant place in local history. Much of its significance arises from its status as the only architectural relic of early 20th-century Crooksville. It is Crooksville's only National Register-listed location and one of one of thirteen countywide, although the Register also includes seven locations in and around the nearby village of Roseville, just outside the county's boundaries.
