= Bearfield =

Bearfield may refer to:

== Places ==
- Bearfield Township, Ohio, United States
- Bearfield, an area of Bradford on Avon, Wiltshire, England

== Fictional characters ==
- Pike Bearfield, eponymous hero of the Pike Bearfield series of stories by Robert E. Howard
