= Ludington, Ohio =

- Unincorporated community
- Location within Ohio Location within the United States
- Coordinates: 39°35′37″N 82°09′38″W
- Country: United States
- State: Ohio
- County: Perry
- Elevation: 771 ft (235 m)
- Time zone: UTC-5 (Eastern (EST))
  - Summer (DST): UTC-4 (EDT)
- Area code: 740
- GNIS feature ID: 1076316

Ludington is an unincorporated community in the township of Salt Lick Township, Perry County, Ohio, United States.
