= Portersville, Ohio =

Unincorporated community in Ohio, US

Coordinates: 39°40′29″N 82°01′52″W

Portersville is an unincorporated community in Perry County, in the U.S. state of Ohio. The town borders neighboring Morgan County and is in Bearfield Township.

== History ==
Portersville was laid out in 1848 by John Porter, and named for him. A post office called Portersville was established in 1849, and remained in operation until 1941.
