= Millertown =

Millertown may refer to:

- Millertown, Newfoundland and Labrador, a town
- Millertown, Ohio, an unincorporated community in Perry County
- Millertown, West Virginia, an unincorporated community in Taylor County

== See also ==
- Millertown Junction
