= Ohio State Route 278 =

State highway in southeastern Ohio, US

State Route 278

Route information
- Maintained by ODOT
- Length: 27.61 mi (44.43 km)
- Existed: 1930–present

Major junctions
- South end: US 50 near McArthur
- US 33 Bus. in Nelsonville
- North end: SR 595 near Nelsonville

Location
- Country: United States
- State: Ohio
- Counties: Vinton, Hocking, Athens

Highway system
- Ohio State Highway System; Interstate; US; State; Scenic
← SR 277	→ SR 279

State Route 278 (SR 278) is a north–south state highway located in the southeastern part of the U.S. state of Ohio. The southern terminus of SR 278 is at US 50 approximately 4.75 miles (7.64 km) east of McArthur. The highway's northern terminus is at the T-intersection it has with SR 595 nearly 5.50 miles (8.85 km) northwest of Nelsonville.

Established in the early 1930s, SR 278 primarily connects rural communities in Vinton, Hocking, and Athens Counties. In Vinton County, it passes through and provides access to the Zaleski State Forest and Lake Hope State Park.

== Route description ==
SR 278 travels through the large portions of the counties of Vinton, Hocking and Athens. There are no segments of SR 278 that are a part of the National Highway System.

== History ==
When it was designated in 1930, SR 278 was a spur route that ran along the segment of the current route between its current southern terminus at US 50 and the village of Zaleski. In 1937, the highway was extended north from Zaleski, through Nelsonville up to its current northern terminus at SR 595.

== Major intersections ==
County	Location	mi	km	Destinations	Notes
Vinton	Madison Township	0.00	0.00	US 50	
Vinton	Zaleski	3.42	5.50	SR 677 south / 2nd Street	Northern terminus of SR 677
Hocking	Starr Township	13.24	21.31	SR 56 west – Laurelville	Southern end of SR 56 concurrency
Hocking	Starr Township	13.33	21.45	SR 56 east – Athens	Northern end of SR 56 concurrency
Athens	Nelsonville	21.60	34.76	US 33 Bus. (West Canal Street) to US 33 – Logan, Athens	
Hocking	Green Township	27.61	44.43	SR 595	
1.000 mi = 1.609 km; 1.000 km = 0.621 mi: Concurrency terminus
