= Dicksonton, Ohio =

- Location within Ohio Location within the United States
- Country: United States
- State: Ohio
- County: Perry

Dicksonton is an extinct town in Perry County, in the U.S. state of Ohio.

== History ==
Dicksonton was established in 1875 by George Detwiler and W. H. Price as a mining community for both coal and iron ore. By 1883 the town had about 100 inhabitants, a general store, and a post office. The coal mine and the store closed in 1897. The Dicksonton post office was discontinued in 1908.
