= Buckingham, Ohio =

Unincorporated community in Ohio, U.S.

Coordinates: 39°35′30″N 82°08′16″W

Buckingham is an unincorporated community in Perry County, in the U.S. state of Ohio.

== History ==
Buckingham was platted in 1873. The community's growth remained dormant until the railroad was built through the area in 1881.
