= Sulphur Springs, Perry County, Ohio =

Unincorporated community in Ohio, U.S.

Coordinates: 39°36′02″N 82°09′59″W

Sulphur Springs is an unincorporated community in Perry County, in the U.S. state of Ohio.

== History ==
Sulphur Springs was named for a mineral spring near the original town site.
