= Clarksville, Perry County, Ohio =

Unincorporated community in Ohio, U.S.

Coordinates: 39°42′19″N 82°17′29″W

Clarksville is an unincorporated community in Perry County, in the U.S. state of Ohio.

== History ==
Clarksville was laid out in 1854 by Daniel Clark, and named for him.
