= Moxahala, Ohio =

Unincorporated community in Ohio, U.S.

Coordinates: 39°39′45″N 82°08′11″W

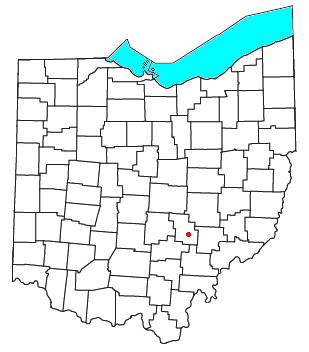
Location of Moxahala, Ohio

Moxahala is an unincorporated community in northern Pleasant Township, Perry County, Ohio, United States. It has a post office with the ZIP code 43761. State Route 13 runs through Moxahala, connecting it with New Lexington to the northwest and Rendville to the southeast.

Moxahala was laid out in 1873. A post office has been in operation at Moxahala since 1874.
