= Sego Lily (disambiguation) =

The sego lily (Calochortus nuttallii) is a bulbous perennial endemic to the Western U.S., and is the state flower of Utah.

Sego Lily may also refer to:

- Sego Lily, the newsletter of the Utah Native Plant Society
- Sego Lily School, Salt Lake City, U.S., a Sudbury school

== See also ==
- Sego (disambiguation)
