= Crossenville, Ohio =

Unincorporated community in Ohio, U.S.

Coordinates: 39°40′50″N 82°21′23″W

Crossenville is an unincorporated community in Perry County, in the U.S. state of Ohio.

== History ==
William Crossen founded Crossenville in 1817, and named it for himself. The Crossenville post office closed in 1905.
