= Chapel Hill, Ohio =

Unincorporated community in Ohio, U.S.

Coordinates: 39°37′25″N 82°03′13″W

Chapel Hill is an unincorporated community in Perry County, Ohio.

== History ==
Chapel Hill was laid out in 1849. A post office called Chapel Hill was established in 1848 and remained in operation until 1894.
