= Pleasant Township, Perry County, Ohio =

Township in Ohio, US

- Township
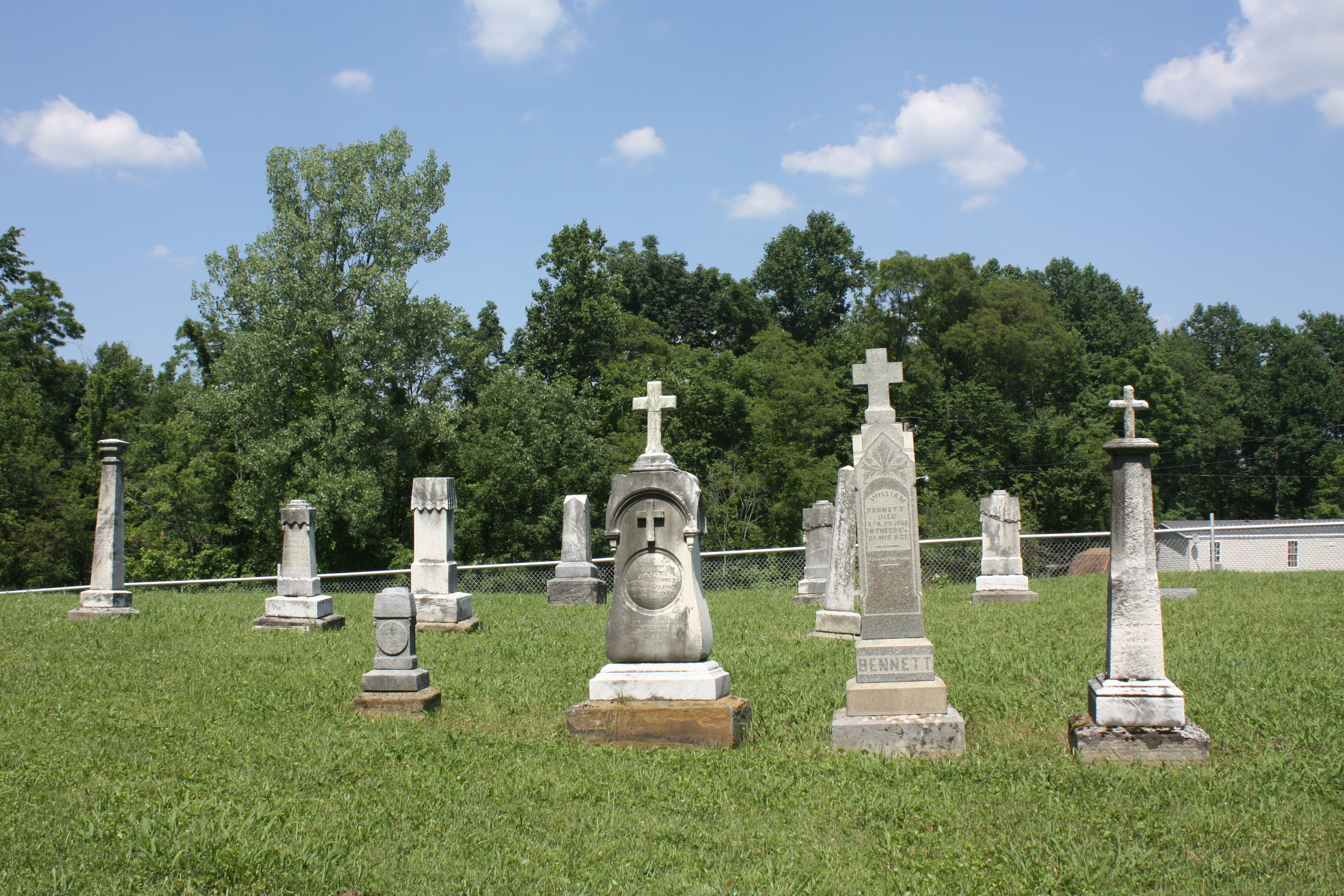
- South Fork Cemetery near Moxahala

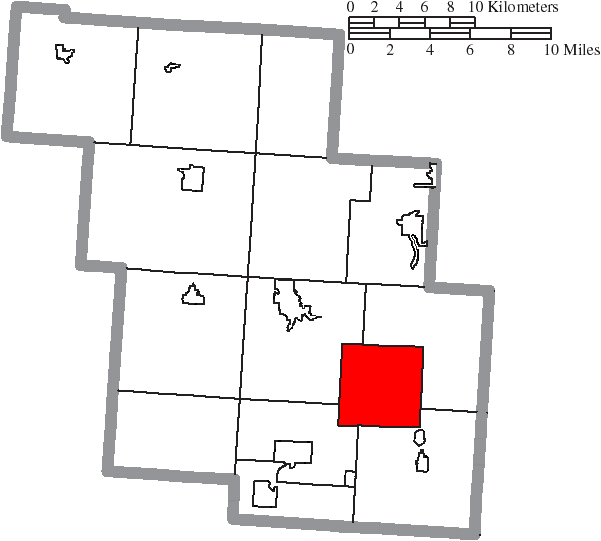
- Location of Pleasant Township in Perry County
- Coordinates: 39°39′23″N 82°7′28″W
- Country: United States
- State: Ohio
- County: Perry

Area
  - Total: 16.2 sq mi (42.0 km^{2})
  - Land: 15.8 sq mi (41.0 km^{2})
  - Water: 0.35 sq mi (0.9 km^{2})
- Elevation: 920 ft (280 m)

Population (2020)
  - Total: 842
  - Density: 53/sq mi (20.5/km^{2})
- Time zone: UTC-5 (Eastern (EST))
  - Summer (DST): UTC-4 (EDT)
- FIPS code: 39-63366
- GNIS feature ID: 1086788

Pleasant Township is one of the fourteen townships of Perry County, Ohio, United States. The 2020 census found 842 people in the township.

== Geography ==
Located in the southeastern part of the county, it borders the following townships:

- Bearfield Township - northeast
- Monroe Township - southeast
- Salt Lick Township - southwest
- Pike Township - northwest

No municipalities are located in Pleasant Township, although the unincorporated community of Moxahala lies in the township's north.

== Name and history ==
Pleasant Township was established in 1850. It is one of fifteen Pleasant Townships statewide.

== Government ==
The township is governed by a three-member board of trustees, who are elected in November of odd-numbered years to a four-year term beginning on the following January 1. Two are elected in the year after the presidential election and one is elected in the year before it. There is also an elected township fiscal officer, who serves a four-year term beginning on April 1 of the year after the election, which is held in November of the year before the presidential election. Vacancies in the fiscal officership or on the board of trustees are filled by the remaining trustees.
