= San Toy, Ohio =

Ghost town in Ohio, United States

Coordinates: 39°39′22″N 82°02′09″W

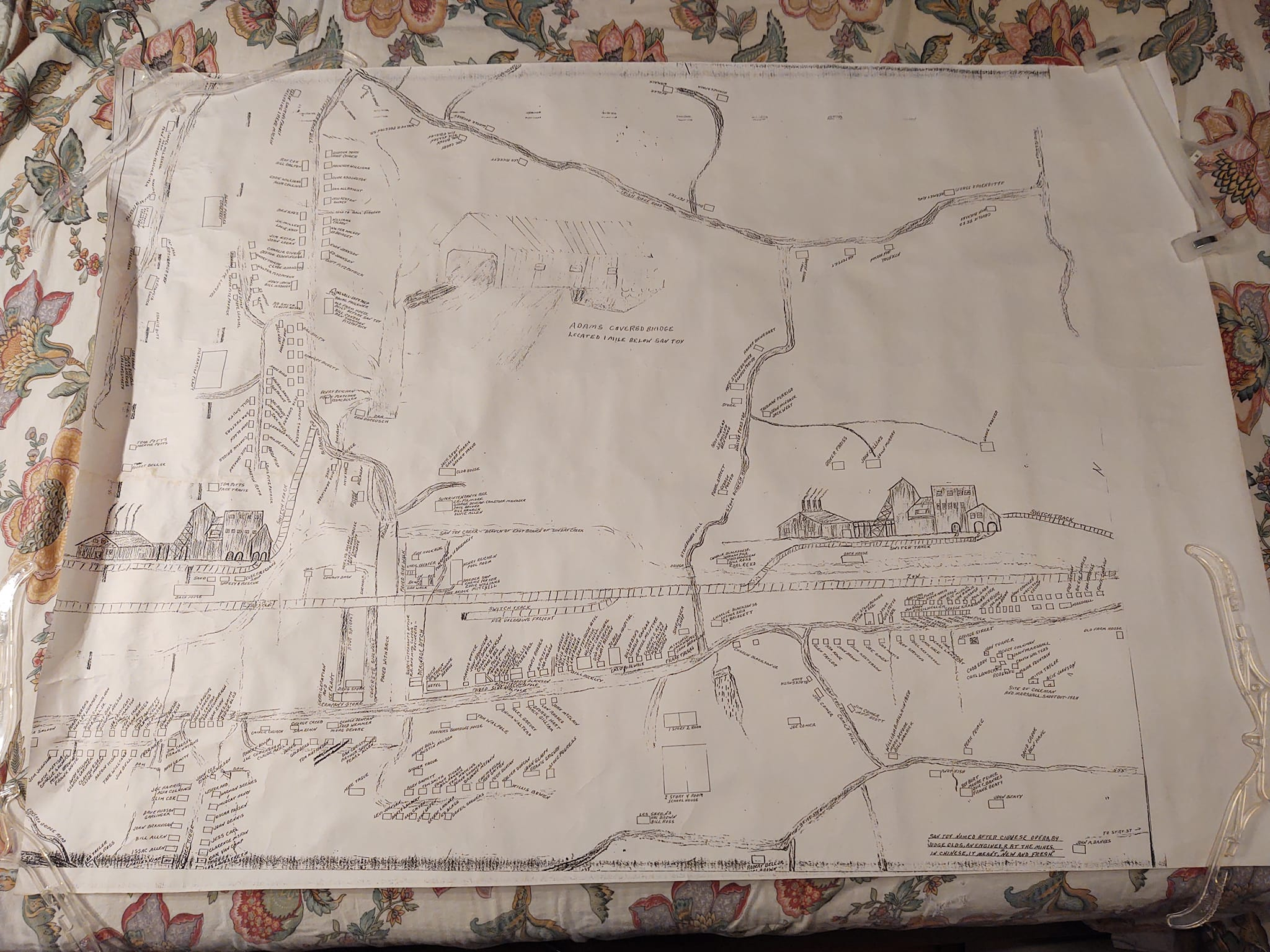

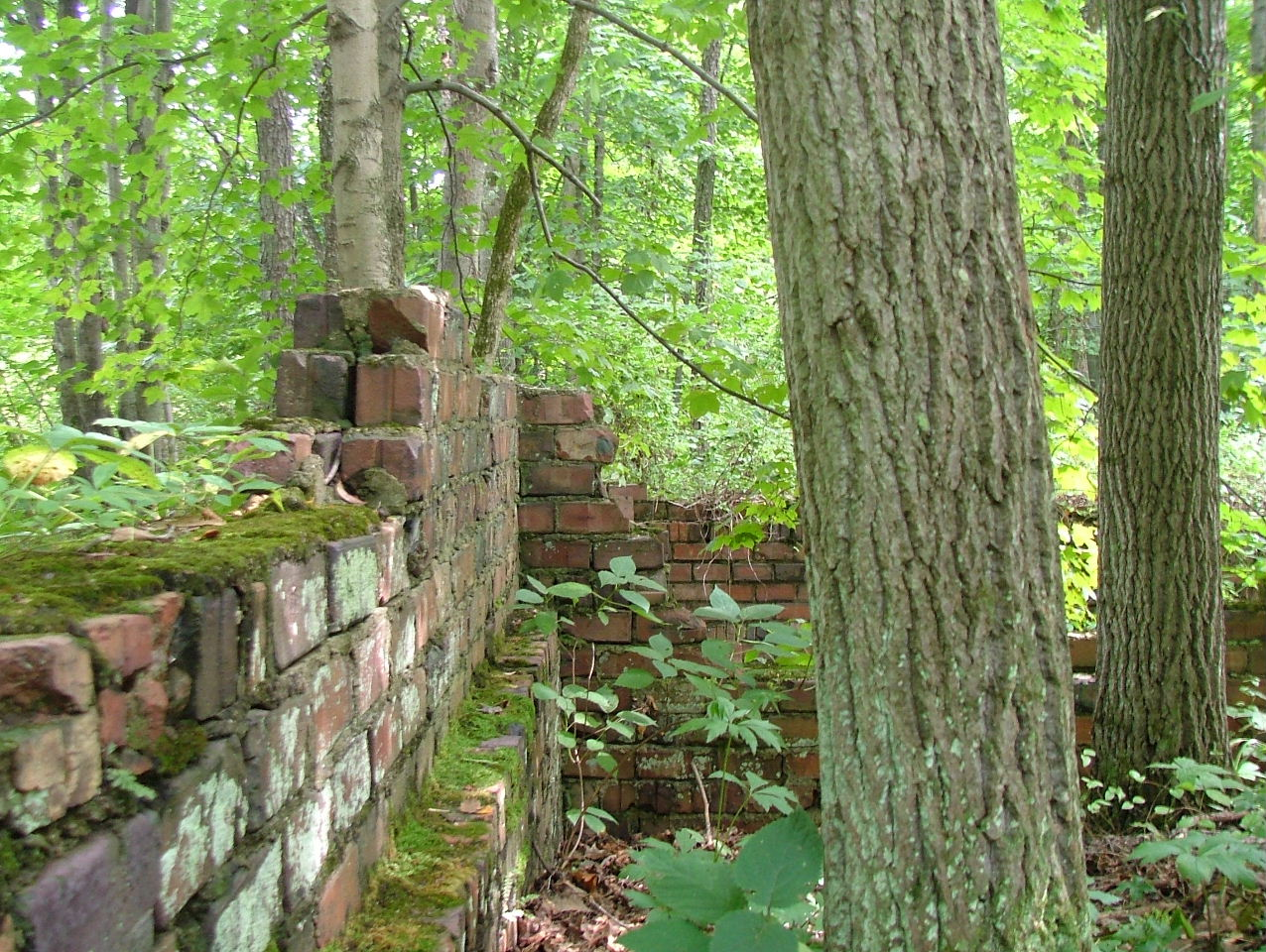
Remains of a wall in San Toy

Interactive map pinpointing the town

San Toy is a ghost town in southeastern Bearfield Township, Ohio, Perry County, Ohio, United States. A flourishing community in the early 20th century, it was a coal town created by the Sunday Creek Coal Company.

== Decline ==
According to the 1930 census, San Toy was the town in the United States whose population had decreased the most per capita since the previous census (976 in 1920 to just 128 in 1930). In 1931, 17 of the 19 registered voters voted to abandon the town. Today approximately 50 people live in the area that was once San Toy. Many foundations and roads of the once busy town remain. A local road is named in its honor.

== See also ==
- New Straitsville mine fire
