= Coal Township, Perry County, Ohio =

Township in Ohio, US

- Township
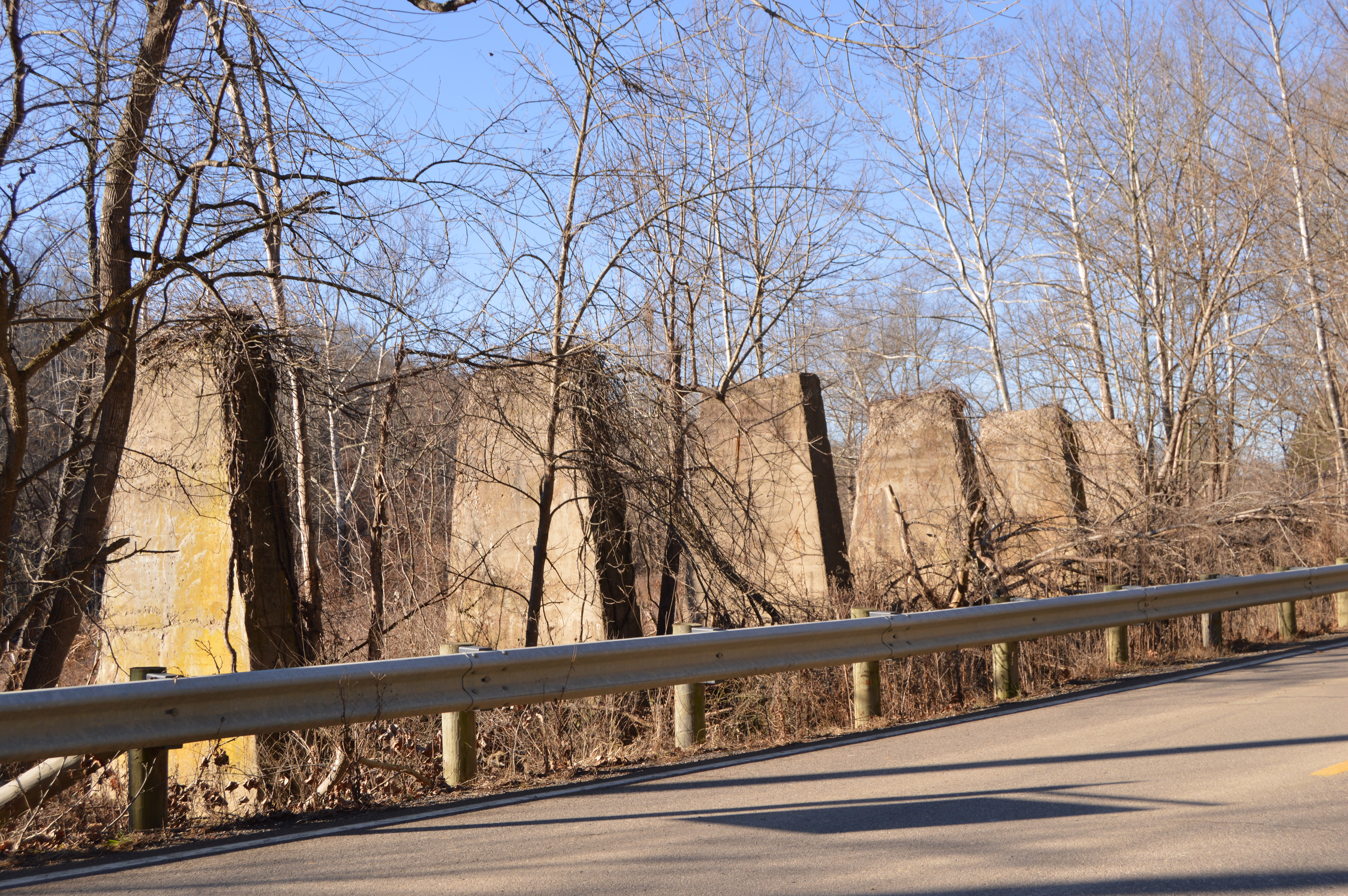
- State Route 93 west of New Straitsville

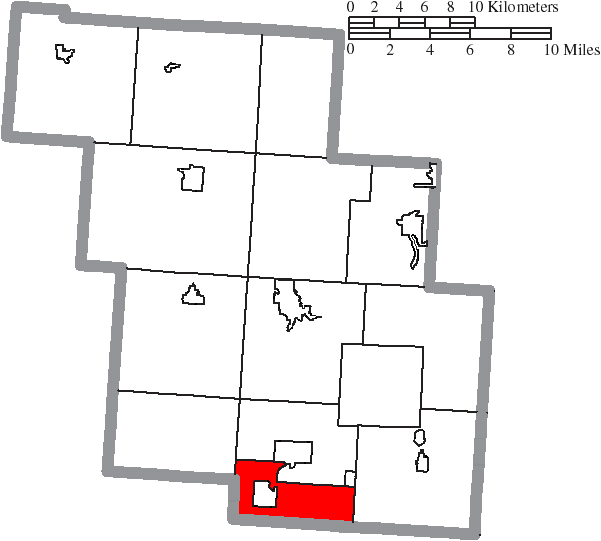
- Location of Coal Township in Perry County
- Coordinates: 39°35′3″N 82°13′57″W
- Country: United States
- State: Ohio
- County: Perry

Area
  - Total: 14.0 sq mi (36.2 km^{2})
  - Land: 14.0 sq mi (36.2 km^{2})
  - Water: 0 sq mi (0.0 km^{2})
- Elevation: 860 ft (262 m)

Population (2020)
  - Total: 939
  - Density: 67.2/sq mi (25.9/km^{2})
- Time zone: UTC-5 (Eastern (EST))
  - Summer (DST): UTC-4 (EDT)
- FIPS code: 39-16350
- GNIS feature ID: 1086780

Coal Township is one of the fourteen townships of Perry County, Ohio, United States. The 2020 census found 939 people in the township.

== Geography ==
Located in the southern part of the county, it borders the following townships:

- Salt Lick Township - north
- Monroe Township - east
- Trimble Township, Athens County - southeast corner
- Ward Township, Hocking County - south
- Falls Township, Hocking County (northeastern portion) - west
- Monday Creek Township - northwest

The village of New Straitsville is located in western Coal Township.

== Name and history ==
Coal Township was established in 1872, and so named for the local coal-mining industry. Statewide, the only other Coal Township is located in Jackson County.

== Government ==
The township is governed by a three-member board of trustees, who are elected in November of odd-numbered years to a four-year term beginning on the following January 1. Two are elected in the year after the presidential election and one is elected in the year before it. There is also an elected township fiscal officer, who serves a four-year term beginning on April 1 of the year after the election, which is held in November of the year before the presidential election. Vacancies in the fiscal officership or on the board of trustees are filled by the remaining trustees.
