= Moxahala Park, Ohio =

Unincorporated community in Ohio, U.S.

Coordinates: 39°52′48″N 82°03′17″W

Moxahala Park is an unincorporated community in Muskingum County, in the U.S. state of Ohio.

Moxahala Park had its start in 1906 when an amusement park opened near the site.
