= Millertown, Ohio =

Unincorporated community in Ohio, U.S.

Coordinates: 39°35′59″N 82°05′50″W

Millertown is an unincorporated community in Perry County, in the U.S. state of Ohio.

== History ==
Millertown was laid out in 1834 by Jacob Miller, and named for him.
