= Sego, Ohio =

Unincorporated community in Ohio, U.S.

Coordinates: 39°50′50″N 82°12′28″W

Sego is an unincorporated community in Perry County, in the U.S. state of Ohio.

== History ==
Sego had its start in 1846 when a blacksmith shop was built there; a mill soon followed. The name Sego is said to be African in origin.
