= McCuneville, Ohio =

Unincorporated community in Ohio, U.S.

Coordinates: 39°37′44″N 82°14′04″W

McCuneville is an unincorporated community in Perry County, in the U.S. state of Ohio.

== History ==
McCuneville had its start in 1829 when salt production began at the site. McCuneville was laid out in 1873, and named for the local McCune family. A post office called McCuneville was established in 1872, and remained in operation until 1951.
