= Coal Township, Jackson County, Ohio =

Township in Ohio, US

- Township
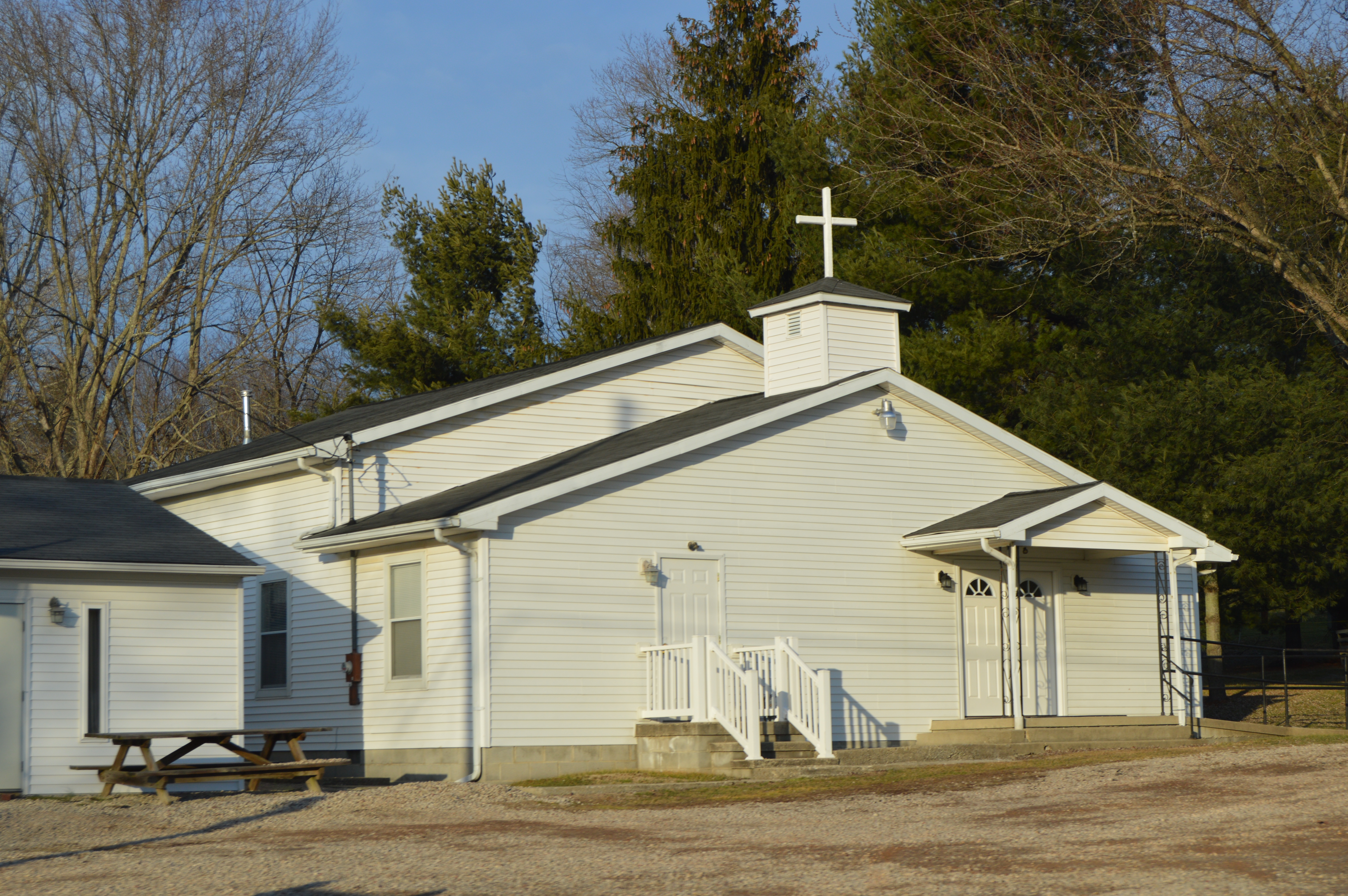
- Glen Roy Community Freewill Baptist Church

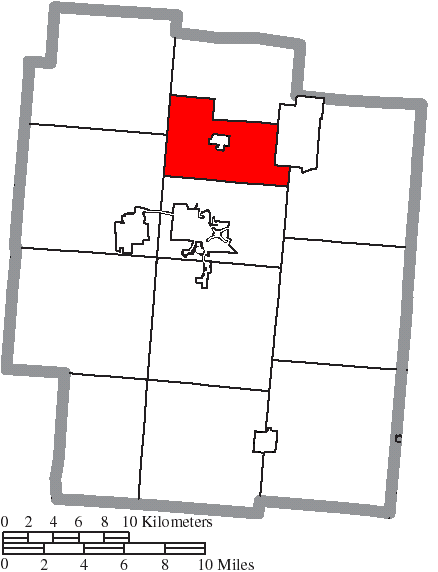
- Location of Coal Township in Jackson County
- Coordinates: 39°6′32″N 82°36′35″W
- Country: United States
- State: Ohio
- County: Jackson

Area
  - Total: 19.4 sq mi (50.2 km^{2})
  - Land: 19.4 sq mi (50.2 km^{2})
  - Water: 0 sq mi (0.0 km^{2})
- Elevation: 778 ft (237 m)

Population (2020)
  - Total: 1,996
  - Density: 103/sq mi (39.8/km^{2})
- Time zone: UTC-5 (Eastern (EST))
  - Summer (DST): UTC-4 (EDT)
- FIPS code: 39-16336
- GNIS feature ID: 1086364

Coal Township is one of the twelve townships of Jackson County, Ohio, United States. As of the 2020 census, 1,996 people lived in the township.

== Geography ==
Located in the northern part of the county, it borders the following townships:

- Washington Township: north
- Milton Township: east
- Lick Township: south
- Liberty Township: southwest
- Jackson Township: northwest

Of the three Jackson County townships that do not border another county (Franklin, Lick, and Coal), Coal Township is the farthest north.

The village of Coalton is located in central Coal Township, and part of the city of Wellston occupies the northwestern corner of the township.

== Name and history ==
Statewide, the only other Coal Township is located in Perry County.

== Government ==
The township is governed by a three-member board of trustees, who are elected in November of odd-numbered years to a four-year term beginning on the following January 1. Two are elected in the year after the presidential election and one is elected in the year before it. There is also an elected township fiscal officer, who serves a four-year term beginning on April 1 of the year after the election, which is held in November of the year before the presidential election. Vacancies in the fiscal officership or on the board of trustees are filled by the remaining trustees.
