= Bearfield Township, Ohio =

Township in Ohio, US

- Township
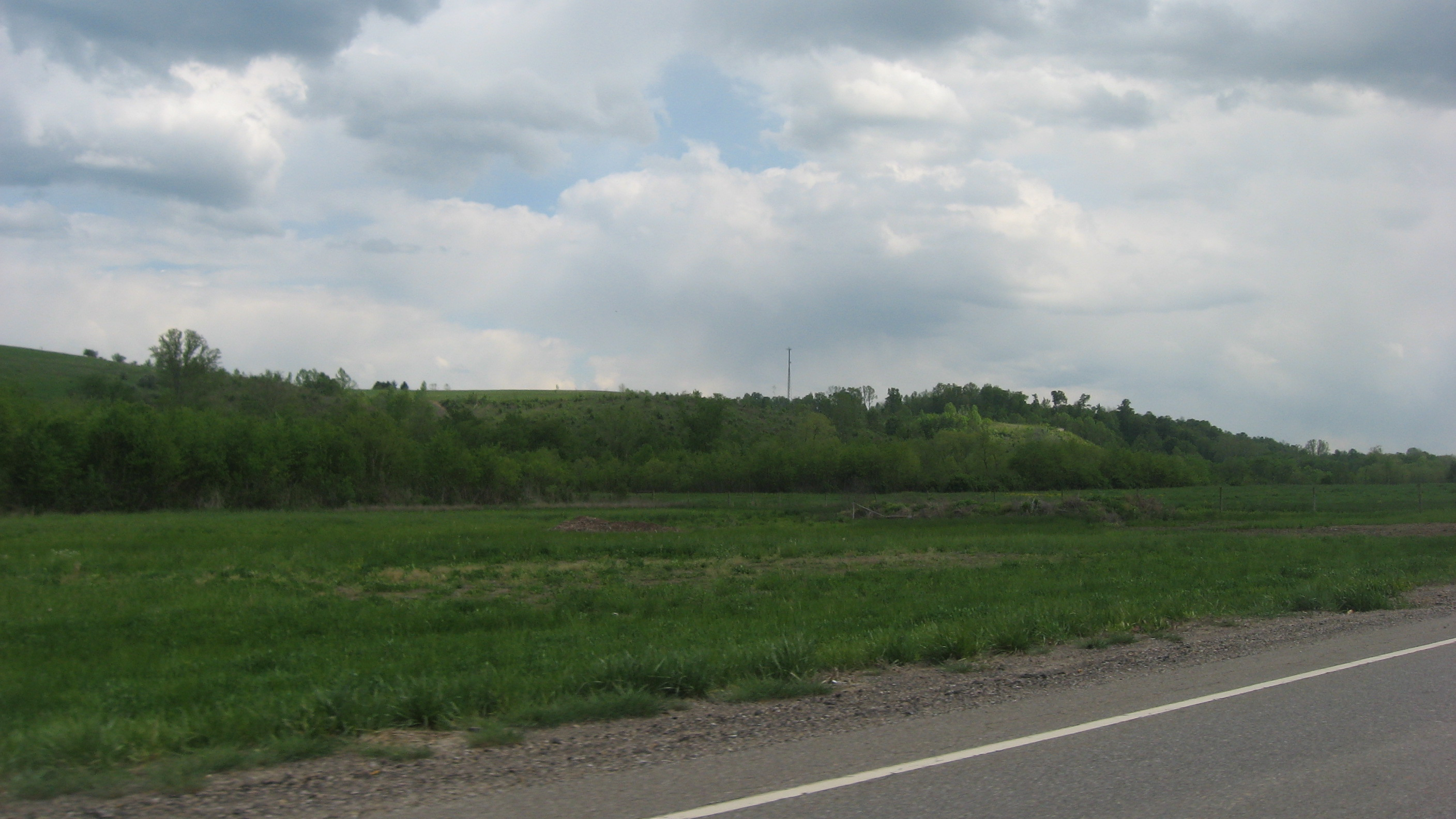
- Moxahala Creek valley along State Route 93

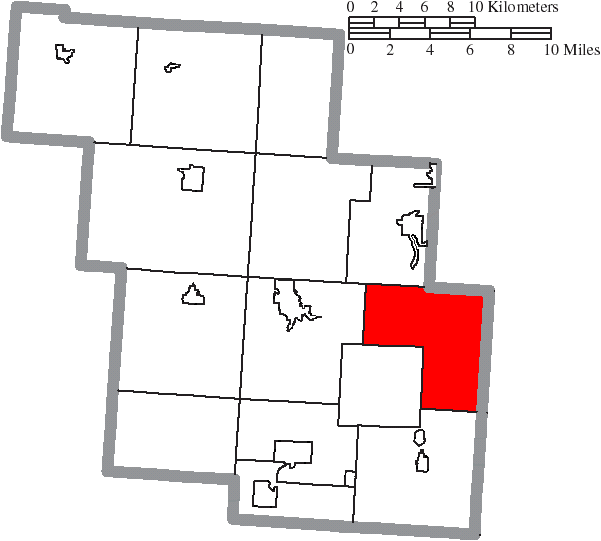
- Location of Bearfield Township in Perry County
- Coordinates: 39°41′22″N 82°5′2″W
- Country: United States
- State: Ohio
- County: Perry

Area
  - Total: 27.6 sq mi (71.5 km^{2})
  - Land: 27.5 sq mi (71.1 km^{2})
  - Water: 0.15 sq mi (0.4 km^{2})
- Elevation: 860 ft (262 m)

Population (2020)
  - Total: 1,465
  - Density: 53/sq mi (20.6/km^{2})
- Time zone: UTC-5 (Eastern (EST))
  - Summer (DST): UTC-4 (EDT)
- FIPS code: 39-04584
- GNIS feature ID: 1086778

Bearfield Township is one of the fourteen townships of Perry County, Ohio, United States. The 2020 census found 1,465 people in the township.

== Communities ==
- Milligan is an unincorporated area located at 39°43′40″N 82°06′07″W within the northwest portion of the township.
- San Toy is a ghost town located at 39°39′22″N 82°02′09″W within the southeast portion of the township.

== Geography ==
Located in the eastern part of the county, it borders the following townships:

- Harrison Township - north
- York Township, Morgan County - northeast
- Deerfield Township, Morgan County - east
- Union Township, Morgan County - southeastern corner
- Monroe Township - south
- Pleasant Township - southwest
- Pike Township - west

No municipalities are located in Bearfield Township.

== Name and history ==
It is the only Bearfield Township statewide.

== Government ==
The township is governed by a three-member board of trustees, who are elected in November of odd-numbered years to a four-year term beginning on the following January 1. Two are elected in the year after the presidential election and one is elected in the year before it. There is also an elected township fiscal officer, who serves a four-year term beginning on April 1 of the year after the election, which is held in November of the year before the presidential election. Vacancies in the fiscal officership or on the board of trustees are filled by the remaining trustees.
