= Robert Sego =

American politician

Member of the U.S. House of Representatives from Missouri's 43rd district
- In office 1975–1993

Missouri House of Representatives

Personal details
- Born: 1933 Denver, Missouri, US
- Died: 2020 (aged 86–87)
- Party: Democratic
- Spouse: Darlyne Louise Brennnan
- Children: 4 (1 son, 3 daughters)
- Occupation: farmer

Robert Franklin "Bob" Sego (July 2, 1933 - March 17, 2020) was an American Democratic politician who served for 18 years in the Missouri House of Representatives. He was born in Denver, Missouri, and was educated at Denver elementary school and at Grant City High School. On December 1, 1956, he married Darlyne Louise Brennnan in Kansas City, Missouri. Sego served in the United States Army between 1953 and 1955 and was stationed for a time in Germany.
