= Rendville, Ohio =

- Village
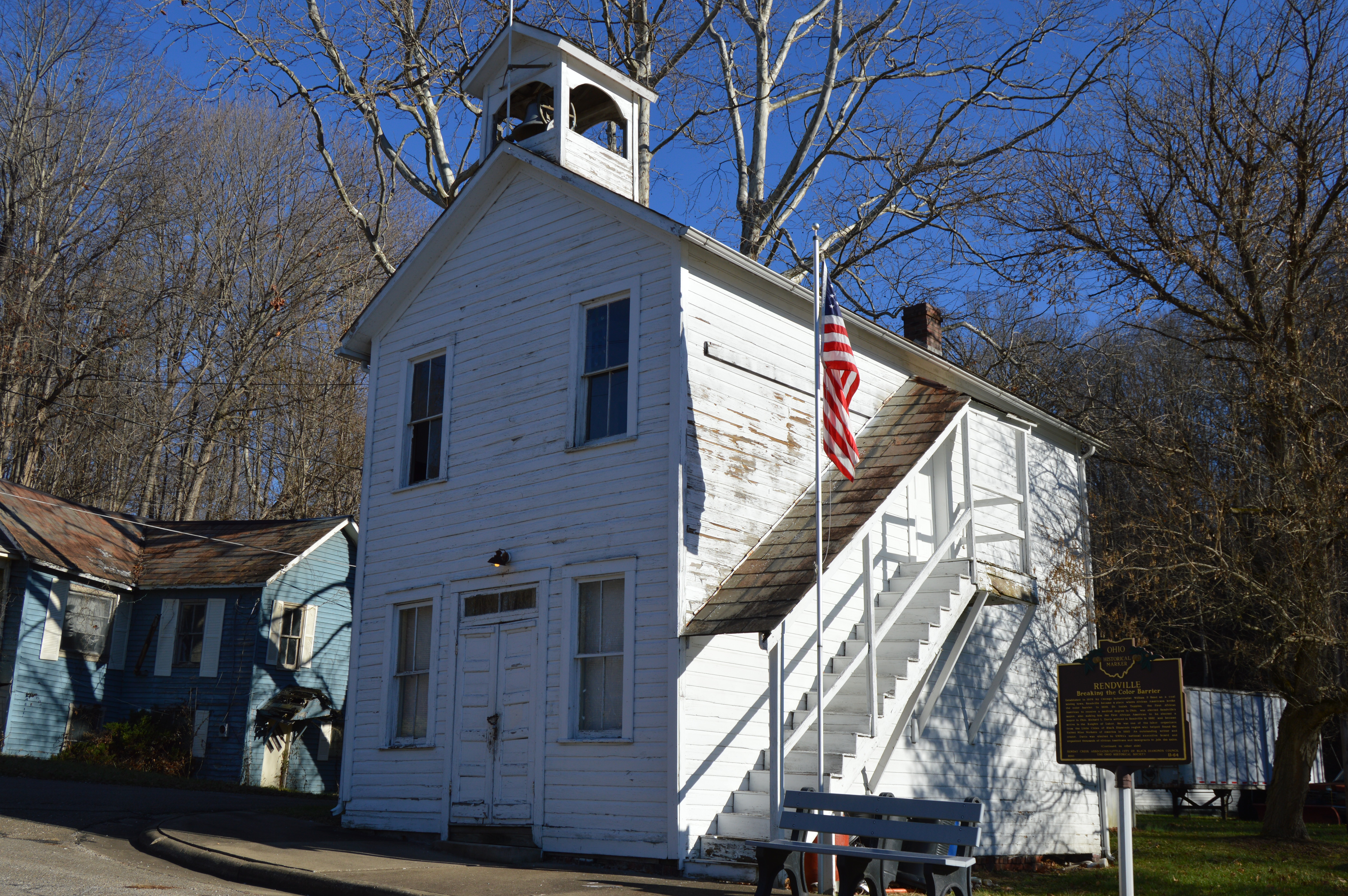
- Village Hall

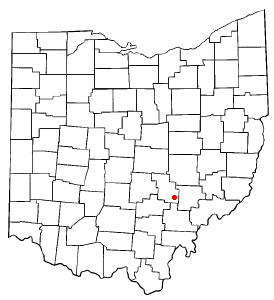
- Location of Rendville, Ohio

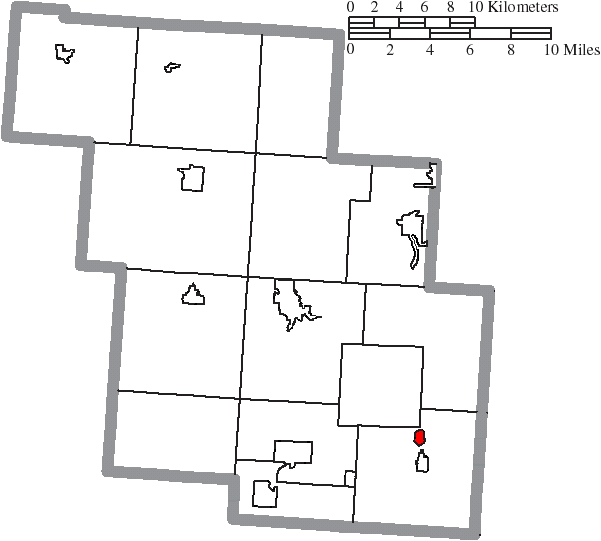
- Location of Rendville in Perry County
- Coordinates: 39°37′20″N 82°05′21″W
- Country: United States
- State: Ohio
- County: Perry
- Established: 1879

Government
  - Type: Mayor council government

Area
  - Total: 0.31 sq mi (0.81 km^{2})
  - Land: 0.31 sq mi (0.81 km^{2})
  - Water: 0 sq mi (0.00 km^{2})
- Elevation: 758 ft (231 m)

Population (2020)
  - Total: 28
  - Density: 89.8/sq mi (34.68/km^{2})
- Time zone: UTC-5 (Eastern (EST))
  - Summer (DST): UTC-4 (EDT)
- Postal code: Original 43775 Current 43730
- Area code: 740
- FIPS code: 39-66222
- GNIS feature ID: 2399056

Rendville is a village in Perry County, Ohio, United States. It is an old mining town in southeastern Appalachian Ohio. The population was 28 at the 2020 census, making it the smallest incorporated community in Ohio.

== History ==
Rendville was founded in 1879 by William P. Rend, and named after him. A post office was established at Rendville in 1879, and remained in operation until 1982. In 1888, Isiah Tuppins was elected as the first African-American mayor in Ohio.

== Geography ==
Rendville is located along Sunday Creek.

According to the United States Census Bureau, the village has a total area of 0.31 square miles (0.80 km^{2}), all land.

== Demographics ==
Historical population
Census	Pop.	Note	%±
1880	349		—
1890	859		146.1%
1900	790		−8.0%
1910	623		−21.1%
1920	515		−17.3%
1930	331		−35.7%
1940	387		16.9%
1950	301		−22.2%
1960	197		−34.6%
1970	82		−58.4%
1980	68		−17.1%
1990	32		−52.9%
2000	46		43.8%
2010	36		−21.7%
2020	28		−22.2%
U.S. Decennial Census

=== 2010 census ===
As of the census of 2010, there were 36 people, 18 households, and 11 families living in the village. The population density was 116.1 inhabitants per square mile (44.8/km^{2}). There were 28 housing units at an average density of 90.3 per square mile (34.9/km^{2}). The racial makeup of the village was 80.6% White, 8.3% African American, and 11.1% from two or more races.

There were 18 households, of which 16.7% had children under the age of 18 living with them, 38.9% were married couples living together, 16.7% had a female householder with no husband present, 5.6% had a male householder with no wife present, and 38.9% were non-families. 22.2% of all households were made up of individuals, and 5.6% had someone living alone who was 65 years of age or older. The average household size was 2.00 and the average family size was 2.27.

The median age in the village was 54.5 years. 11.1% of residents were under the age of 18; 8.5% were between the ages of 18 and 24; 8.4% were from 25 to 44; 44.5% were from 45 to 64; and 27.8% were 65 years of age or older. The gender makeup of the village was 44.4% male and 55.6% female.

=== 2000 census ===
As of the census of 2000, there were 46 people, 19 households, and 12 families living in the village. The population density was 148.5 inhabitants per square mile (57.3/km^{2}). There were 30 housing units at an average density of 96.8 per square mile (37.4/km^{2}). The racial makeup of the village was 86.96% White, 10.87% African American, and 2.17% from two or more races.

There were 19 households, out of which 31.6% had children under the age of 18 living with them, 52.6% were married couples living together, 15.8% had a female householder with no husband present, and 31.6% were non-families. 31.6% of all households were made up of individuals, and 15.8% had someone living alone who was 65 years of age or older. The average household size was 2.42 and the average family size was 3.08.

In the village, the population was spread out, with 26.1% under the age of 18, 10.9% from 18 to 24, 28.3% from 25 to 44, 17.4% from 45 to 64, and 17.4% who were 65 years of age or older. The median age was 36 years. For every 100 females there were 91.7 males. For every 100 females age 18 and over, there were 112.5 males.

The median income for a household in the village was $38,750, and the median income for a family was $39,583. Males had a median income of $28,125 versus $26,250 for females. The per capita income for the village was $17,002. There were 15.8% of families and 13.2% of the population living below the poverty line, including no under eighteens and 45.5% of those over 64.
