= Hemlock, Ohio =

- Village
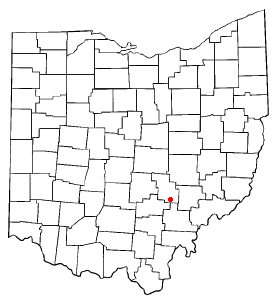
- Location of Hemlock, Ohio

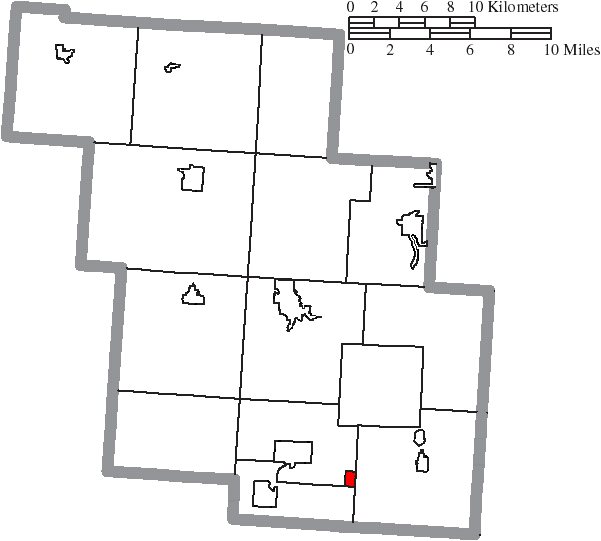
- Location of Hemlock in Perry County
- Coordinates: 39°35′26″N 82°09′16″W
- Country: United States
- State: Ohio
- County: Perry
- Settled: June 15, 1869
- Incorporated: July 15, 1872

Government
  - Type: Mayor council government
  - Mayor: James R. Knippa

Area
  - Total: 0.37 sq mi (0.97 km^{2})
  - Land: 0.37 sq mi (0.96 km^{2})
  - Water: 0.0039 sq mi (0.01 km^{2})
- Elevation: 856 ft (261 m)

Population (2020)
  - Total: 142
  - Estimate (2023): 145
  - Density: 381.5/sq mi (147.28/km^{2})
- Time zone: UTC-5 (Eastern (EST))
  - Summer (DST): UTC-4 (EDT)
- ZIP code: Original 43743. Current 43730
- Area code: 740
- FIPS code: 39-34888
- GNIS feature ID: 2398486

Hemlock is a village in Perry County, Ohio, United States. The population was 142 at the 2020 census.

== History ==
Originally settled as Coaldale on June 15, 1869, then established as Hemlock on July 15, 1872. The Hemlock post office was in operation until October 3, 1986. The village was named for a grove of hemlock trees near the original town site.

== Geography ==
According to the United States Census Bureau, the village has a total area of 0.37 square miles (0.96 km^{2}), all land.

== Demographics ==
Historical population
Census	Pop.	Note	%±
1900	581		—
1910	452		−22.2%
1920	497		10.0%
1930	282		−43.3%
1940	353		25.2%
1950	253		−28.3%
1960	227		−10.3%
1970	199		−12.3%
1980	197		−1.0%
1990	203		3.0%
2000	142		−30.0%
2010	155		9.2%
2020	142		−8.4%
2023 (est.)	145	▲	2.1%
U.S. Decennial Census

=== 2010 census ===
As of the census of 2010, there were 155 people, 56 households, and 46 families living in the village. The population density was 418.9 inhabitants per square mile (161.7/km^{2}). There were 71 housing units at an average density of 191.9 per square mile (74.1/km^{2}). The racial makeup of the village was 100.0% White.

There were 56 households, of which 37.5% had children under the age of 18 living with them, 64.3% were married couples living together, 12.5% had a female householder with no husband present, 5.4% had a male householder with no wife present, and 17.9% were non-families. 17.9% of all households were made up of individuals, and 5.4% had someone living alone who was 65 years of age or older. The average household size was 2.77 and the average family size was 3.00.

The median age in the village was 39.4 years. 25.2% of residents were under the age of 18; 9.7% were between the ages of 18 and 24; 22.6% were from 25 to 44; 30.9% were from 45 to 64; and 11.6% were 65 years of age or older. The gender makeup of the village was 49.7% male and 50.3% female.

=== 2000 census ===
As of the census of 2000, there were 142 people, 48 households, and 39 families living in the village. The population density was 374.2 inhabitants per square mile (144.5/km^{2}). There were 58 housing units at an average density of 152.9 per square mile (59.0/km^{2}). The racial makeup of the village was 95.07% White, 2.11% Asian, and 2.82% from two or more races. Hispanic or Latino of any race were 2.11% of the population.

There were 48 households, out of which 45.8% had children under the age of 18 living with them, 66.7% were married couples living together, 14.6% had a female householder with no husband present, and 16.7% were non-families. 16.7% of all households were made up of individuals, and 10.4% had someone living alone who was 65 years of age or older. The average household size was 2.96 and the average family size was 3.30.

In the village, the population was spread out, with 33.1% under the age of 18, 8.5% from 18 to 24, 33.1% from 25 to 44, 12.7% from 45 to 64, and 12.7% who were 65 years of age or older. The median age was 32 years. For every 100 females there were 94.5 males. For every 100 females age 18 and over, there were 82.7 males.

The median income for a household in the village was $26,250, and the median income for a family was $28,333. Males had a median income of $28,750 versus $17,917 for females. The per capita income for the village was $7,701. There were 26.3% of families and 24.3% of the population living below the poverty line, including 29.4% of under eighteens and 22.2% of those over 64.
