= Moxahala Creek =

River in USA

Coordinates: 39.90396°N 82.00180°W

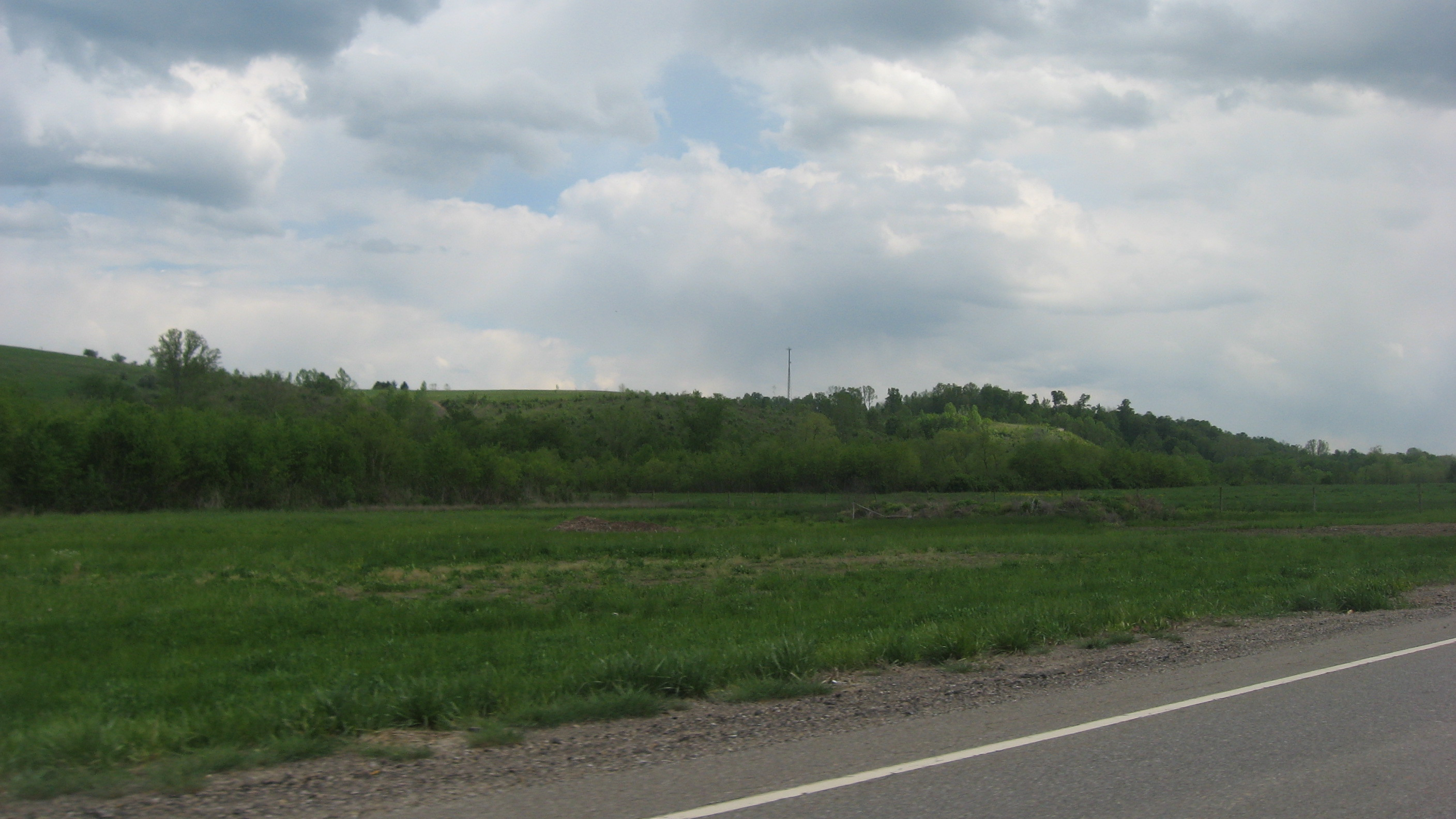
- Along the creek south of Crooksville

Physical characteristics
- Source
  - location: 4 mi (6.4 km) south of New Lexington
  - elevation: ~ 1,040 ft (320 m)
- Mouth
  - location: Muskingum River at South Zanesville
  - elevation: ~ 680 ft (210 m)
- Length: 29.2 mi (47.0 km)
- Basin size: 301 mi^{2} (780 km^{2})

Moxahala Creek is a tributary of the Muskingum River, 29.2 miles (47.0 km) long, in southeastern Ohio in the United States. Via the Muskingum and Ohio Rivers, it is part of the watershed of the Mississippi River, draining an area of 301 square miles (780 km^{2})

Moxahala Creek rises in southeastern Perry County and flows generally northward into southern Muskingum County, past Crooksville and Roseville. It joins the Muskingum River at South Zanesville.

It was historically also known as Jonathan's Creek.

== See also ==
- List of rivers of Ohio
