= Corning, Ohio =

Village in Ohio, United States

- Village
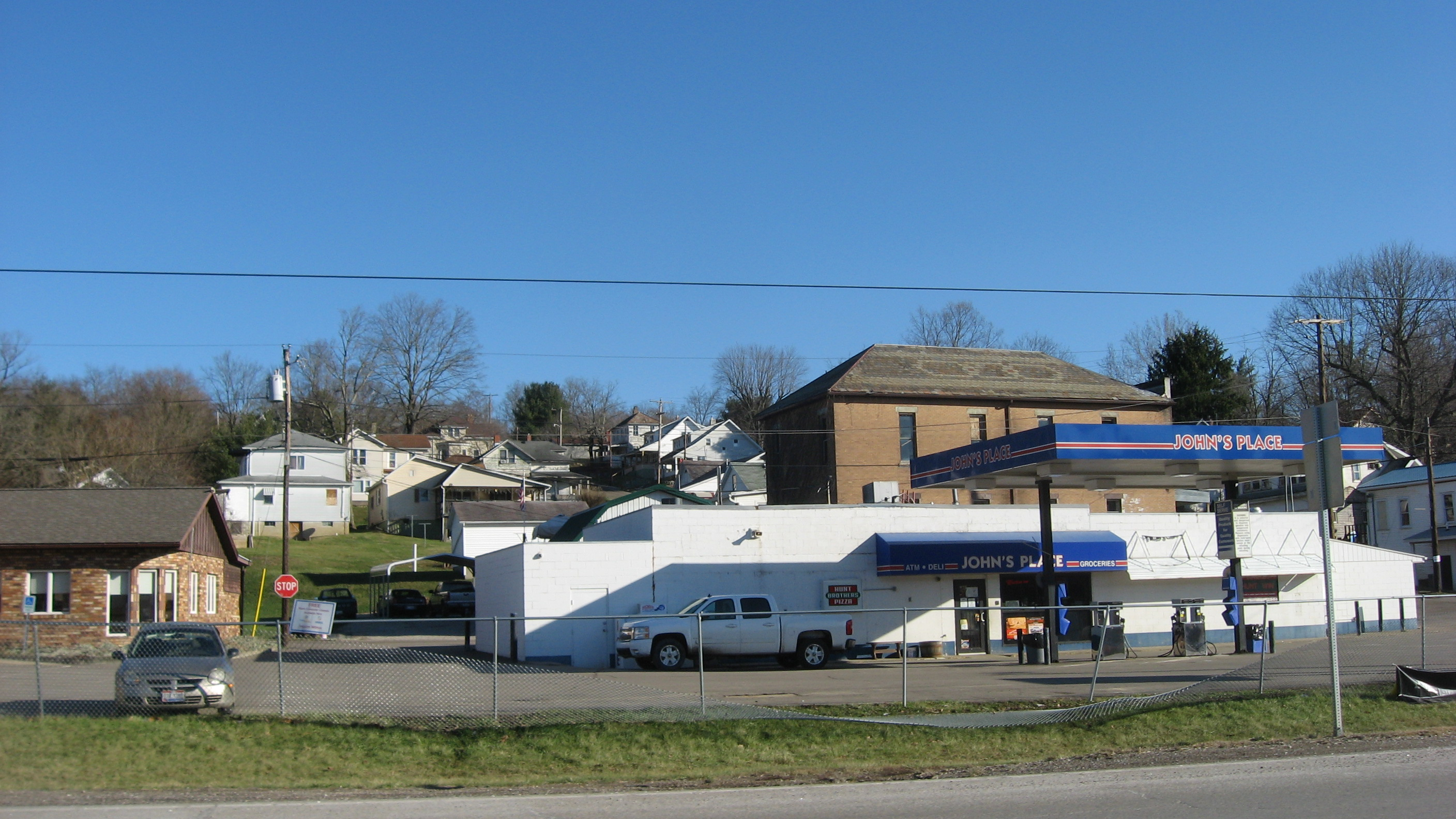
- View from State Route 13

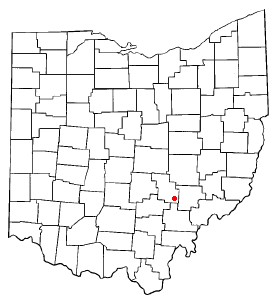
- Location of Corning, Ohio

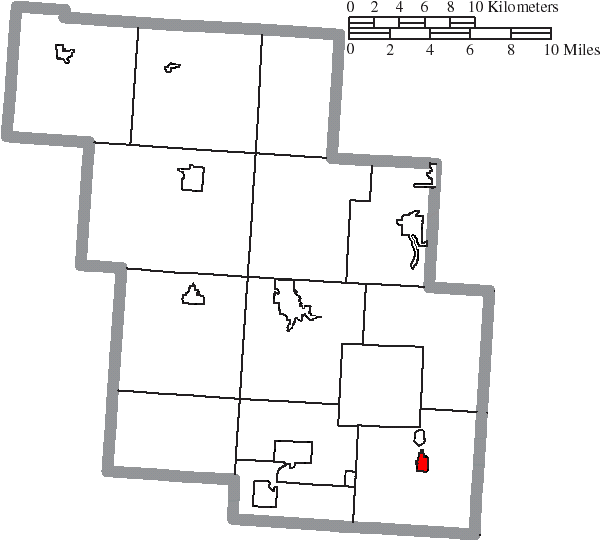
- Location of Corning in Perry County
- Coordinates: 39°36′06″N 82°05′15″W
- Country: United States
- State: Ohio
- County: Perry

Area
  - Total: 0.43 sq mi (1.11 km^{2})
  - Land: 0.43 sq mi (1.11 km^{2})
  - Water: 0 sq mi (0.00 km^{2})
- Elevation: 764 ft (233 m)

Population (2020)
  - Total: 488
  - Estimate (2023): 485
  - Density: 1,134.7/sq mi (438.11/km^{2})
- Time zone: UTC-5 (Eastern (EST))
  - Summer (DST): UTC-4 (EDT)
- ZIP code: 43730
- Area code: 740
- FIPS code: 39-18770
- GNIS feature ID: 2398629

Corning is a village in Perry County, Ohio, United States. The population was 488 at the 2020 census.

== History ==
Originally named Ferrara, the town was focused on farming along the Sunday Creek Valley. That would change when the Atlantic and Lake Erie Railway completed the Moxahala tunnel in 1879. By 1880, Joseph Rodgers sold over 8,000 acres along Sunday Creek to the Ohio Central Coal Company. With New York capitalists investing heavily in the coal camp, the town was soon renamed Corning. A post office has been in operation at Corning since 1880.

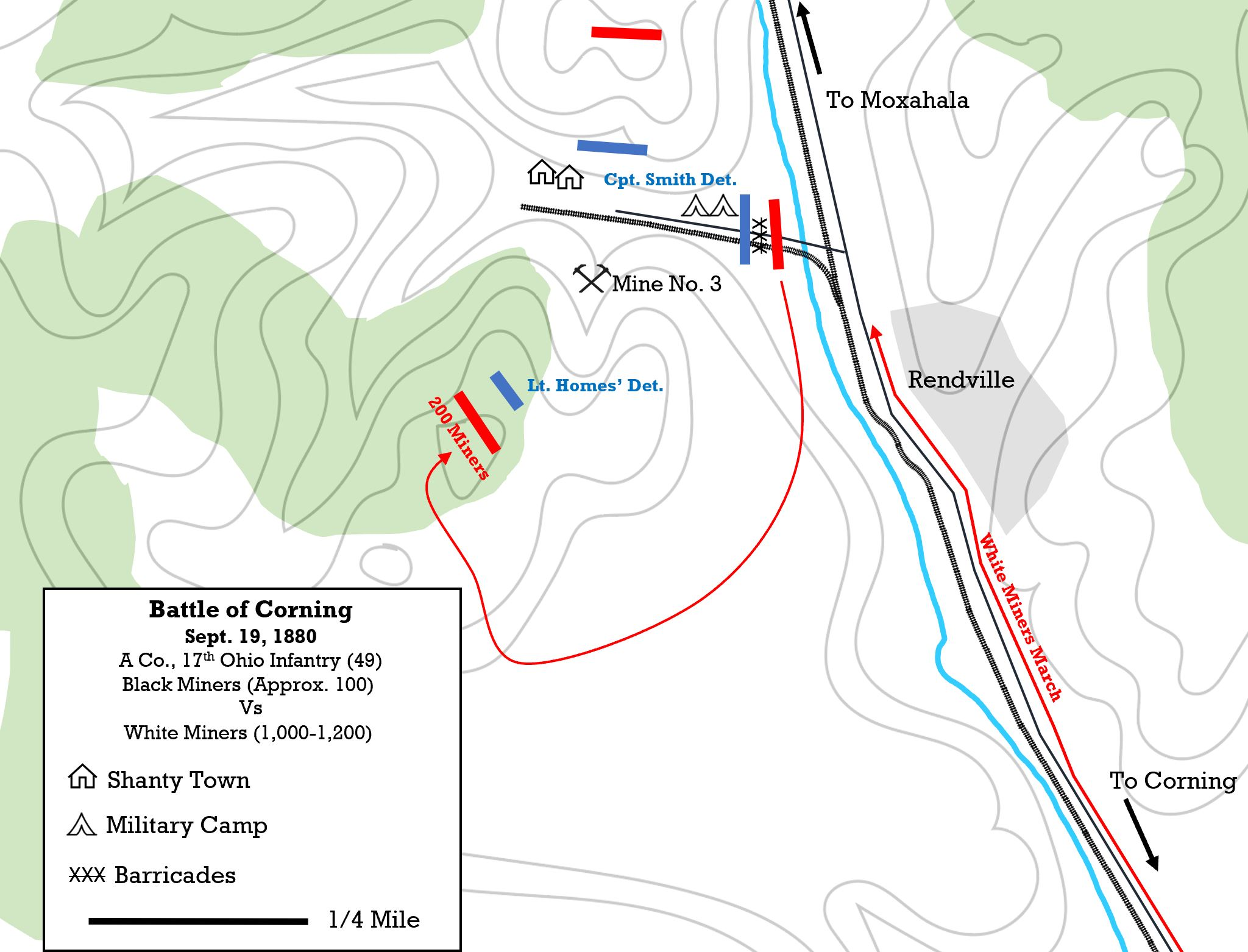
Battle of Corning, September 19, 1880

Known as one of the most lawless towns in the state, Corning can only be compared to violent mining towns such as Tombstone, Arizona, or Deadwood, South Dakota. In addition to shootouts and murders, Corning saw several violent events that made it famous. On September 19, 1880, the Ohio National Guard battled white coal miners trying to force out newly arrived African American miners. The Battle of Corning, or the Corning War, was the first time the Ohio National Guard shed blood in defense of the state.

In 1884, the town witnessed an Irish Catholic Feud between local parish Priest Father Bernard O’Boylan and saloon owner Andy McDevitt. Known as the Corning Church War, the feud gained national attention and grew Corning’s reputation. After several mine strikes during the early 1890s, Corning served as the unofficial site of “insurgency” against the leadership of the newly formed United Mine Workers of America.

At a meeting between Ohio and West Virginia miners at the Mercer Hotel, Richard L. Davis, an African American miner and labor organizer from Rendville, was denied service at the restaurant. In 1895, the Mercer Hotel became the first Ohio business punished under the state’s anti-discrimination laws. The incident at the Mercer Hotel represented the “High Water Mark of the Color Line in Ohio,” establishing a boundary between acceptable and unacceptable segregation of African Americans across the state.

== Geography ==
Corning is located along Sunday Creek.

According to the United States Census Bureau, the village has a total area of 0.43 square miles (1.11 km^{2}), all land.

== Demographics ==
Historical population
Census	Pop.	Note	%±
1880	270		—
1890	1,551		474.4%
1900	1,401		−9.7%
1910	1,564		11.6%
1920	1,628		4.1%
1930	1,411		−13.3%
1940	1,433		1.6%
1950	1,215		−15.2%
1960	1,065		−12.3%
1970	838		−21.3%
1980	789		−5.8%
1990	703		−10.9%
2000	593		−15.6%
2010	583		−1.7%
2020	488		−16.3%
2023 (est.)	485	▼	−0.6%
U.S. Decennial Census

=== 2010 census ===
As of the census of 2010, there were 583 people, 226 households, and 152 families living in the village. The population density was 1,355.8 inhabitants per square mile (523.5/km^{2}). There were 264 housing units at an average density of 614.0 per square mile (237.1/km^{2}). The racial makeup of the village was 97.3% White, 0.5% African American, 0.3% Native American, and 1.9% from two or more races. Hispanic or Latino of any race were 0.3% of the population.

There were 226 households, of which 39.4% had children under the age of 18 living with them, 37.2% were married couples living together, 21.7% had a female householder with no husband present, 8.4% had a male householder with no wife present, and 32.7% were non-families. 25.7% of all households were made up of individuals, and 14.2% had someone living alone who was 65 years of age or older. The average household size was 2.58 and the average family size was 3.07.

The median age in the village was 30.9 years. 30% of residents were under the age of 18; 9.7% were between the ages of 18 and 24; 27.8% were from 25 to 44; 18.8% were from 45 to 64; and 13.7% were 65 years of age or older. The gender makeup of the village was 48.9% male and 51.1% female.

=== 2000 census ===
As of the census of 2000, there were 593 people, 239 households, and 159 families living in the village. The population density was 1,360.1 inhabitants per square mile (525.1/km^{2}). There were 269 housing units at an average density of 617.0 per square mile (238.2/km^{2}). The racial makeup of the village was 97.13% White, 0.34% African American, 0.34% Native American, 0.17% Asian, and 2.02% from two or more races. Hispanic or Latino of any race were 0.17% of the population.

There were 239 households, out of which 29.7% had children under the age of 18 living with them, 49.8% were married couples living together, 13.8% had a female householder with no husband present, and 33.1% were non-families. 28.5% of all households were made up of individuals, and 18.0% had someone living alone who was 65 years of age or older. The average household size was 2.48 and the average family size was 3.03.

In the village, the population was spread out, with 25.8% under the age of 18, 8.6% from 18 to 24, 28.0% from 25 to 44, 20.4% from 45 to 64, and 17.2% who were 65 years of age or older. The median age was 38 years. For every 100 females there were 88.3 males. For every 100 females age 18 and over, there were 84.1 males.

The median income for a household in the village was $27,868, and the median income for a family was $31,875. Males had a median income of $31,875 versus $20,481 for females. The per capita income for the village was $13,615. About 12.5% of families and 15.3% of the population were below the poverty line, including 24.0% of those under age 18 and 8.4% of those age 65 or over.

== Education ==
Southern Local School District operates one elementary school and Miller High School.

Corning has a public library, a branch of the Perry County District Library.
