= Shawnee, Perry County, Ohio =

Shawnee, Ohio
- Village
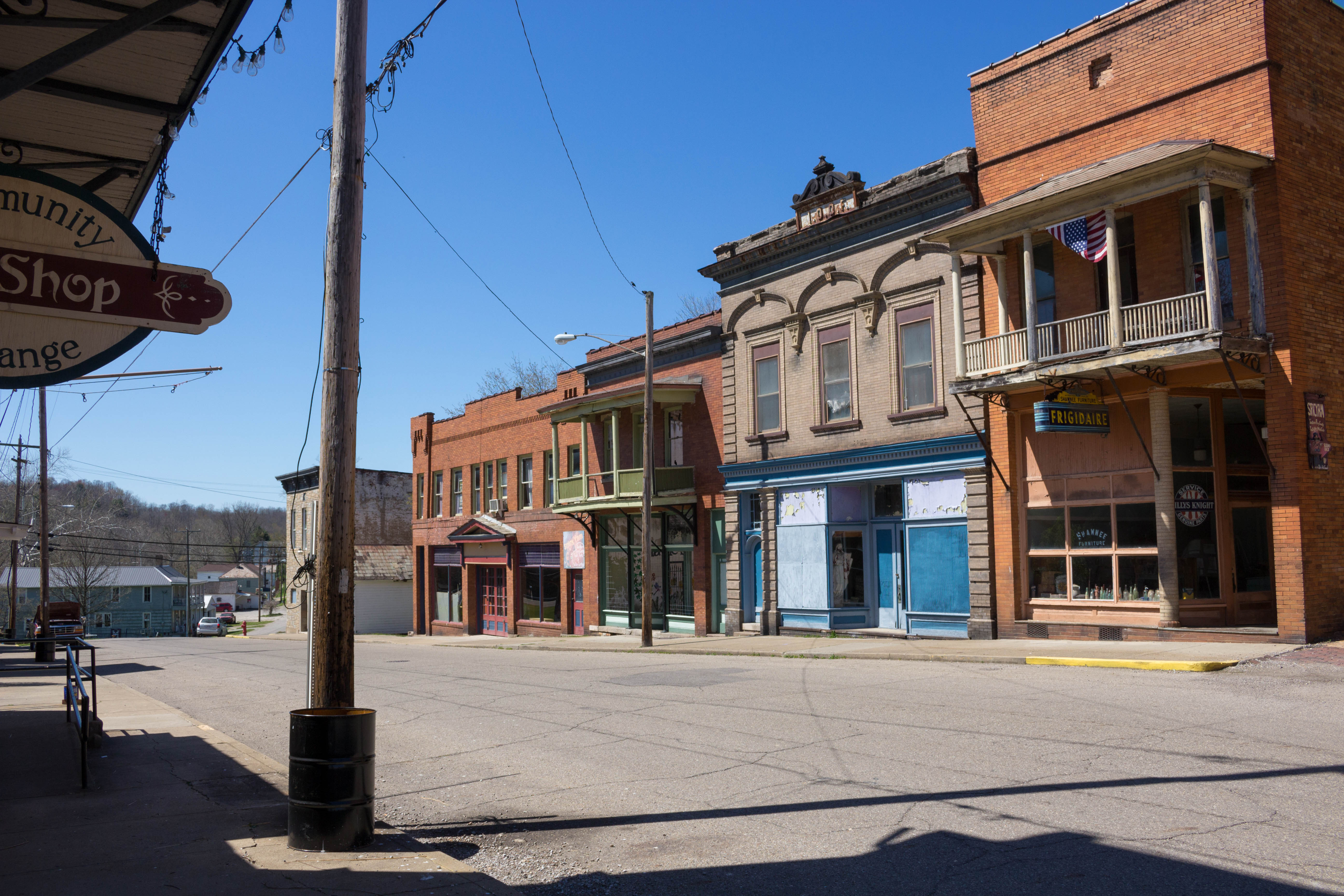
- A portion of Main Street

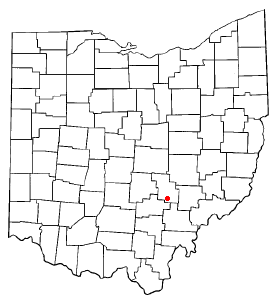
- Location of Shawnee, Ohio

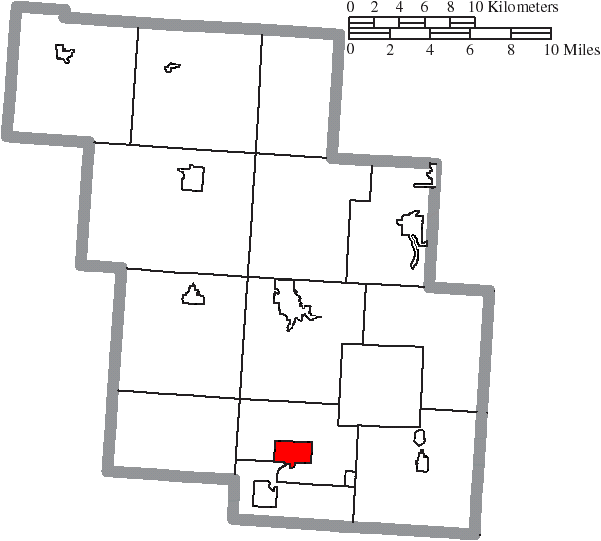
- Location of Shawnee in Perry County
- Coordinates: 39°36′23″N 82°12′16″W
- Country: United States
- State: Ohio
- County: Perry
- Established: 1872

Government
  - Type: Mayor council government

Area
  - Total: 2.26 sq mi (5.86 km^{2})
  - Land: 2.25 sq mi (5.82 km^{2})
  - Water: 0.015 sq mi (0.04 km^{2})
- Elevation: 866 ft (264 m)

Population (2020)
  - Total: 505
  - Density: 224.7/sq mi (86.76/km^{2})
- Time zone: UTC-5 (Eastern (EST))
  - Summer (DST): UTC-4 (EDT)
- ZIP code: 43782
- Area code: 740
- FIPS code: 39-71962
- GNIS feature ID: 2399792

Shawnee is a village in Perry County, Ohio, United States. The population was 505 at the 2020 census. It is 9 miles (14 km) south of the county seat of New Lexington.

== History ==
Shawnee had its start in 1872 when the railroad was extended to that point. The town was platted by investor T. J. Davis on the former Israel Gordon farm, and incorporated as a village in 1874.

The village was named after the Shawnee Indians, and a post office has been in operation at Shawnee since 1872.

Fueled by coal, clay, and oil discoveries in the region, Shawnee quickly became a bustling boomtown. Its population swelled to nearly 4,000 residents by the early 1900s, drawing immigrant miners from Wales, Ireland, and Eastern Europe. The downtown flourished with hotels, banks, saloons, and a variety of shops—earning it the nickname “the Main Street of the Little Cities of Black Diamonds.”

In 1906, the Cincinnati Reds played a demonstration game in the village, highlighting its once-prominent place on the regional map.

Shawnee’s architectural heritage includes several surviving structures from this era. The Knights of Labor Opera House, constructed in 1881, was used as a union hall, library, and community theater. It reflected the rise of organized labor in the region and later housed the Knights of Pythias and a furniture company.

The Tecumseh Theater (originally Red Men’s Hall), built in 1907–08 by the Improved Order of Red Men, became a cultural hub, hosting silent films, lodge meetings, and local sports. Though it closed in 1960, the building was rescued by local volunteers in 1976 and restored for community use.

In the early 2000s, Shawnee was designated a Preserve America community and received Save America’s Treasures grants for historic preservation. Nonprofit efforts—especially by Sunday Creek Associates and the Little Cities of Black Diamonds—have helped revitalize the area through festivals, walking tours, and a regional coal museum.

== Geography ==
According to the United States Census Bureau, the village has a total area of 2.26 square miles (5.85 km^{2}), of which 2.25 square miles (5.83 km^{2}) is land and 0.01 square miles (0.03 km^{2}) is water.

== Demographics ==
Historical population
| Census | Pop. | Note | %± |
|---|---|---|---|
| 1880 | 2,770 | | — |
| 1890 | 3,266 | | 17.9% |
| 1900 | 2,966 | | −9.2% |
| 1910 | 2,280 | | −23.1% |
| 1920 | 1,918 | | −15.9% |
| 1930 | 1,457 | | −24.0% |
| 1940 | 1,475 | | 1.2% |
| 1950 | 1,145 | | −22.4% |
| 1960 | 1,000 | | −12.7% |
| 1970 | 914 | | −8.6% |
| 1980 | 924 | | 1.1% |
| 1990 | 742 | | −19.7% |
| 2000 | 608 | | −18.1% |
| 2010 | 655 | | 7.7% |
| 2020 | 505 | | −22.9% |
U.S. Decennial Census

=== 2010 census ===
As of the census of 2010, there were 655 people, 235 households, and 179 families living in the village. The population density was 291.1 inhabitants per square mile (112.4/km^{2}). There were 275 housing units at an average density of 122.2 per square mile (47.2/km^{2}). The racial makeup of the village was 98.0% White, 0.2% African American, and 1.8% from two or more races. Hispanic or Latino of any race were 0.3% of the population.

There were 235 households, of which 38.3% had children under the age of 18 living with them, 51.1% were married couples living together, 16.2% had a female householder with no husband present, 8.9% had a male householder with no wife present, and 23.8% were non-families. 20.9% of all households were made up of individuals, and 6.8% had someone living alone who was 65 years of age or older. The average household size was 2.79 and the average family size was 3.08.

The median age in the village was 34.9 years. 27.8% of residents were under the age of 18; 7.8% were between the ages of 18 and 24; 26.8% were from 25 to 44; 26.2% were from 45 to 64; and 11.3% were 65 years of age or older. The gender makeup of the village was 52.5% male and 47.5% female.

=== 2000 census ===
As of the census of 2000, there were 608 people, 207 households, and 157 families living in the village. The population density was 305.1 inhabitants per square mile (117.8/km^{2}). There were 235 housing units at an average density of 117.9 per square mile (45.5/km^{2}). The racial makeup of the village was 99.51% White, 0.33% Asian, and 0.16% from two or more races.

There were 207 households, out of which 44.0% had children under the age of 18 living with them, 49.8% were married couples living together, 15.0% had a female householder with no husband present, and 23.7% were non-families. 21.3% of all households were made up of individuals, and 9.7% had someone living alone who was 65 years of age or older. The average household size was 2.94 and the average family size was 3.27.

In the village, the population was spread out, with 31.9% under the age of 18, 8.7% from 18 to 24, 34.2% from 25 to 44, 18.1% from 45 to 64, and 7.1% who were 65 years of age or older. The median age was 31 years. For every 100 females there were 98.7 males. For every 100 females age 18 and over, there were 102.9 males.

The median income for a household in the village was $33,229, and the median income for a family was $37,188. Males had a median income of $30,833 versus $20,833 for females. The per capita income for the village was $11,850. About 14.7% of families and 15.6% of the population were below the poverty line, including 27.4% of those under age 18 and 4.9% of those age 65 or over.

== Landmarks and architecture ==
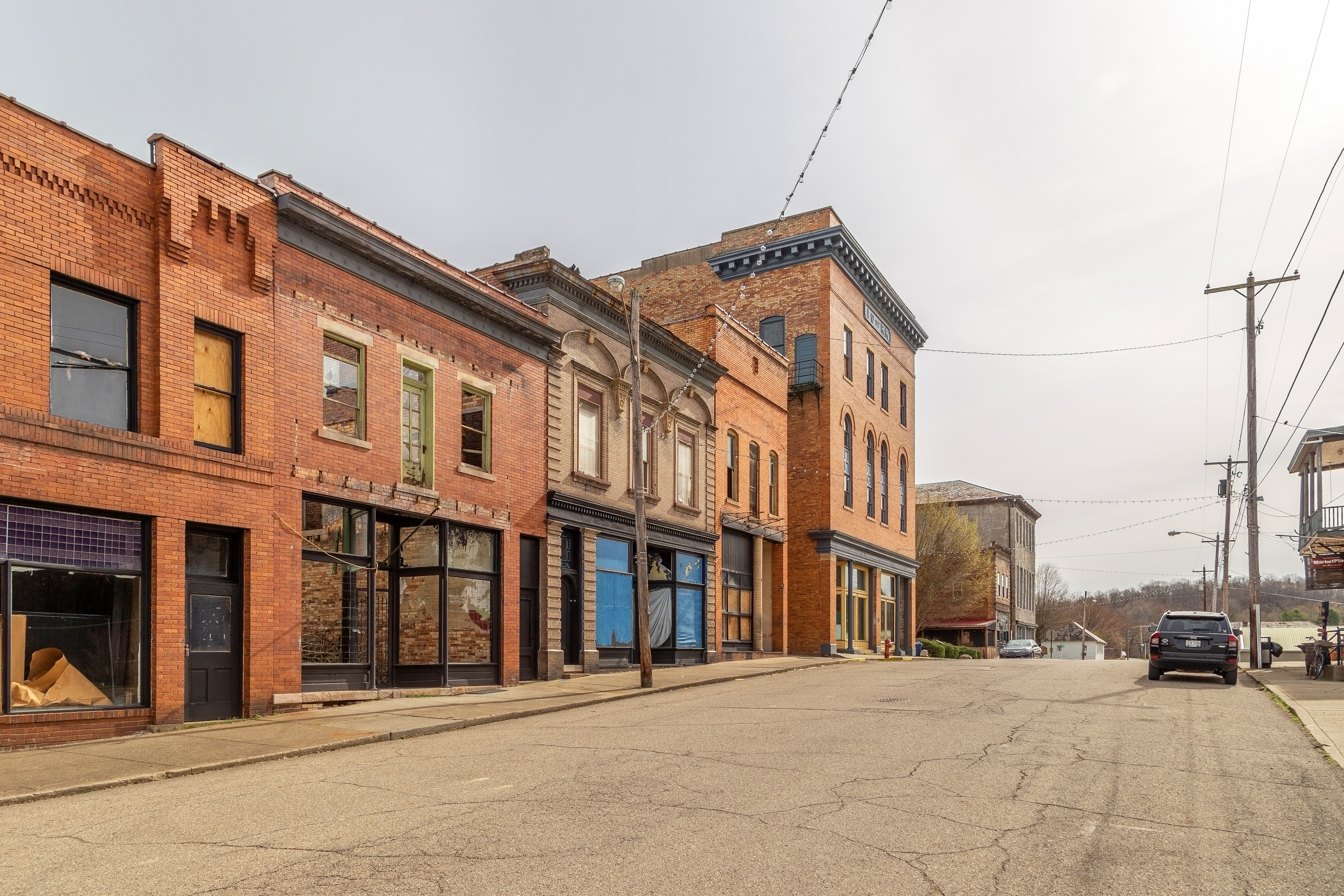
Historic Main Street, featuring the Knights of Labor Opera House and Tecumseh Theater.

Shawnee is noted for its rare surviving examples of Appalachian boomtown architecture. The village’s Main Street Historic District preserves multiple late-19th and early-20th century commercial buildings, many of which feature false-front facades and wooden overhang porches—designs once common in mining towns but now scarce in Ohio.

One of the most prominent landmarks is the Tecumseh Theater, originally constructed as Red Men’s Hall by the Improved Order of Red Men in 1907–08. It is a steel-frame commercial structure built in Classical Revival style and once hosted lodge meetings, vaudeville acts, silent films, and basketball games. After decades of vacancy, it was saved from demolition in 1976 and gradually restored. Today, the theater serves as a performance venue, café, and community cultural space.

Another historic structure is the Knights of Labor Opera House, built in 1881. This multipurpose building once functioned as a cooperative store, union hall, and theater. It symbolized the growing labor movement in the region, particularly the transition of the Knights of Labor from secrecy to public action. It was later repurposed by the Knights of Pythias and subsequently as a furniture showroom in the mid-20th century.

Together, these buildings reflect Shawnee’s past as a center of industrial growth and organized labor in the Hocking Valley coalfields. Preservation efforts led by local nonprofits have helped stabilize many of the structures and maintain the village’s historic character.

== Notable people ==
- Tom Thomas (December 27, 1873 – September 23, 1942), Major League pitcher with the Cleveland Spiders, St. Louis Perfectos and St. Louis Cardinals between 1894 and 1900; a native of Shawnee.
