= New Straitsville, Ohio =

- Village
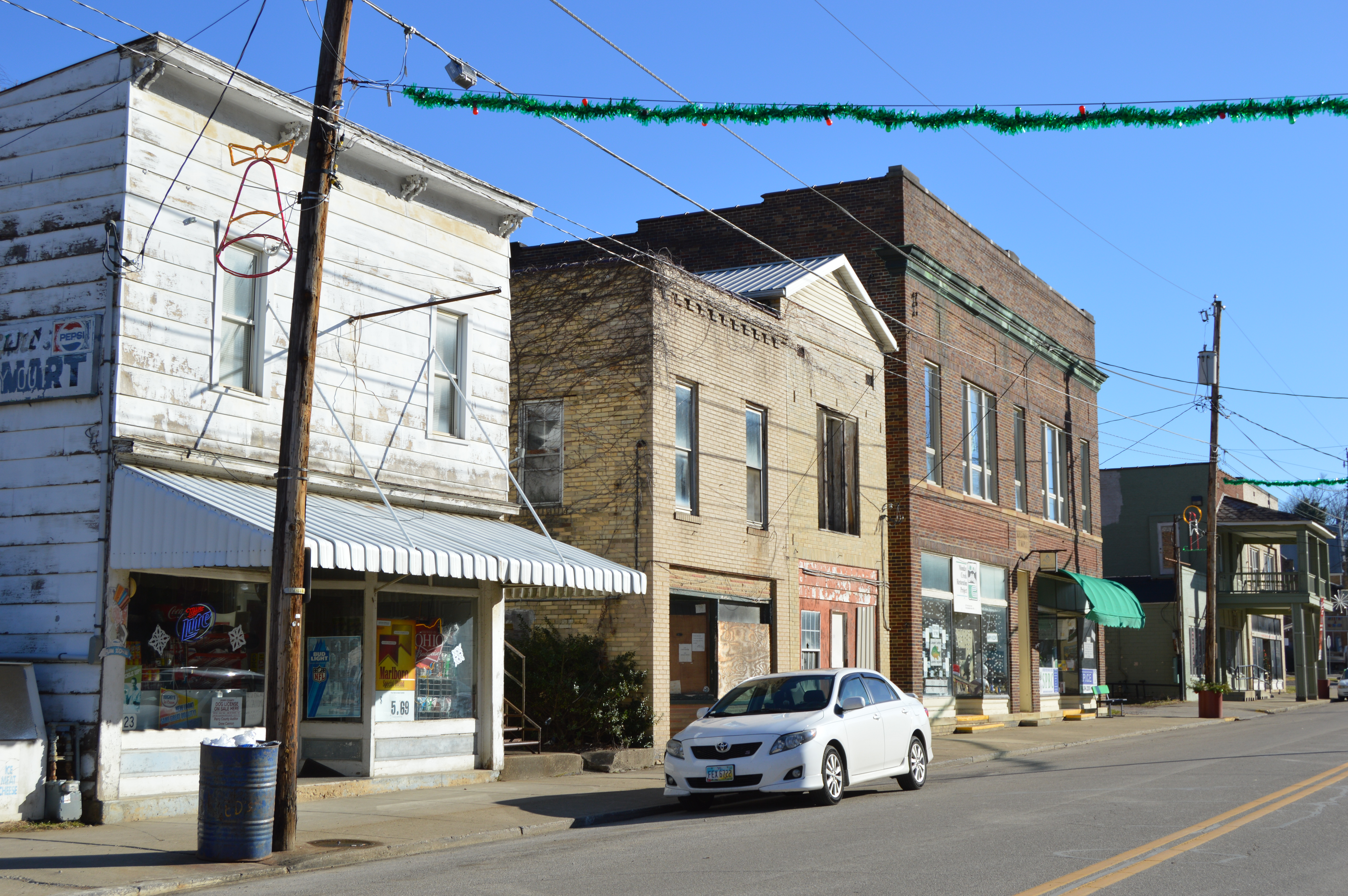
- West Main Street, the village's business district

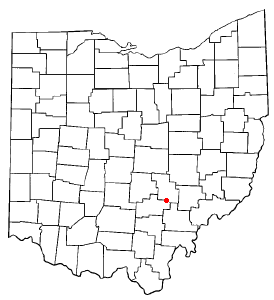
- Location of New Straitsville, Ohio

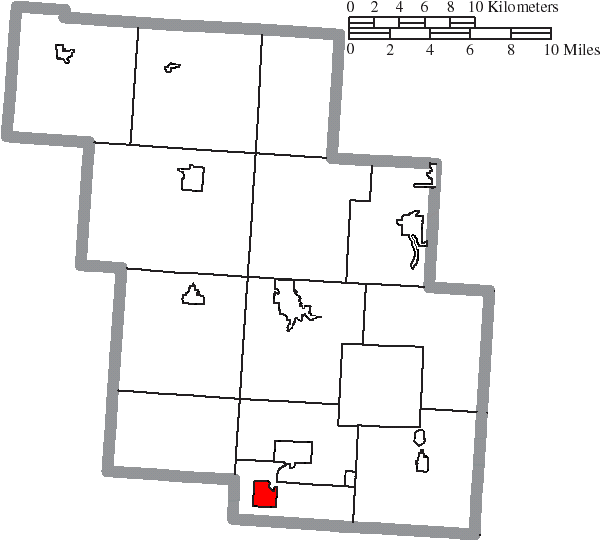
- Location of New Straitsville in Perry County
- Coordinates: 39°34′45″N 82°14′04″W
- Country: United States
- State: Ohio
- County: Perry

Area
  - Total: 1.30 sq mi (3.37 km^{2})
  - Land: 1.30 sq mi (3.37 km^{2})
  - Water: 0 sq mi (0.00 km^{2})
- Elevation: 906 ft (276 m)

Population (2020)
  - Total: 652
  - Density: 501.7/sq mi (193.71/km^{2})
- Time zone: UTC-5 (Eastern (EST))
  - Summer (DST): UTC-4 (EDT)
- ZIP code: 43766
- Area code: 740
- FIPS code: 39-55552
- GNIS feature ID: 2399483

New Straitsville is a village in Perry County, Ohio, United States. The population was 652 at the 2020 census.

== History ==
New Straitsville was founded in 1870 as a coal mining town by the New Straitsville Mining Company. The town grew quickly and by 1880 its population exceeded 4,000. Coal mining terminated in 1884 when a labor dispute at the mine ended with a group of miners sending a burning coal car into the mine, igniting the coal. The heat from the fire was so great that residents could draw hot water directly from wells to brew coffee. The fire in the New Straitsville mine burns to this day. New Straitsville is also famous for its annual "Moonshine Festival" on Memorial Day Weekend.

== Geography ==
According to the United States Census Bureau, the village has a total area of 1.30 square miles (3.37 km^{2}), all land. It lies in the watershed of Monday Creek.

== Demographics ==
Historical population
Census	Pop.	Note	%±
1880	2,782		—
1890	2,782		0.0%
1900	2,302		−17.3%
1910	2,242		−2.6%
1920	2,208		−1.5%
1930	1,718		−22.2%
1940	1,473		−14.3%
1950	1,122		−23.8%
1960	1,019		−9.2%
1970	947		−7.1%
1980	937		−1.1%
1990	865		−7.7%
2000	774		−10.5%
2010	722		−6.7%
2020	652		−9.7%
U.S. Decennial Census

=== 2010 census ===
As of the census of 2010, there were 722 people, 293 households, and 189 families living in the village. The population density was 555.4 inhabitants per square mile (214.4/km^{2}). There were 363 housing units at an average density of 279.2 per square mile (107.8/km^{2}). The racial makeup of the village was 95.7% White, 0.4% African American, and 3.9% from two or more races. Hispanic or Latino of any race were 0.7% of the population.

There were 293 households, of which 33.1% had children under the age of 18 living with them, 43.3% were married couples living together, 15.4% had a female householder with no husband present, 5.8% had a male householder with no wife present, and 35.5% were non-families. 28.7% of all households were made up of individuals, and 12.9% had someone living alone who was 65 years of age or older. The average household size was 2.46 and the average family size was 2.94.

The median age in the village was 37.4 years. 25.6% of residents were under the age of 18; 9.3% were between the ages of 18 and 24; 24.5% were from 25 to 44; 28.8% were from 45 to 64; and 11.8% were 65 years of age or older. The gender makeup of the village was 45.7% male and 54.3% female.

=== 2000 census ===
As of the census of 2000, there were 774 people, 312 households, and 210 families living in the village. The population density was 589.4 inhabitants per square mile (227.6/km^{2}). There were 357 housing units at an average density of 271.9 per square mile (105.0/km^{2}). The racial makeup of the village was 97.67% White, 0.13% African American, 1.03% from other races, and 1.16% from two or more races. Hispanic or Latino of any race were 2.33% of the population.

There were 312 households, out of which 30.4% had children under the age of 18 living with them, 49.0% were married couples living together, 13.1% had a female householder with no husband present, and 32.4% were non-families. 27.6% of all households were made up of individuals, and 13.1% had someone living alone who was 65 years of age or older. The average household size was 2.48 and the average family size was 3.00.

In the village, the population was spread out, with 26.5% under the age of 18, 9.3% from 18 to 24, 27.4% from 25 to 44, 22.1% from 45 to 64, and 14.7% who were 65 years of age or older. The median age was 37 years. For every 100 females there were 92.5 males. For every 100 females age 18 and over, there were 92.9 males.

The median income for a household in the village was $27,557, and the median income for a family was $31,827. Males had a median income of $30,227 versus $19,750 for females. The per capita income for the village was $15,333. About 13.8% of families and 16.6% of the population were below the poverty line, including 26.7% of those under age 18 and 6.2% of those age 65 or over.

== Notable people ==
- Chris Evans, labor union leader
- Clara Green Carl, American murderer and writer
- David Hite, clarinetist
- Jack Taylor - former professional baseball player

== See also ==
- San Toy mine fire
- Centralia mine fire
