= Perry County, Ohio =

County in Ohio, United States

- County
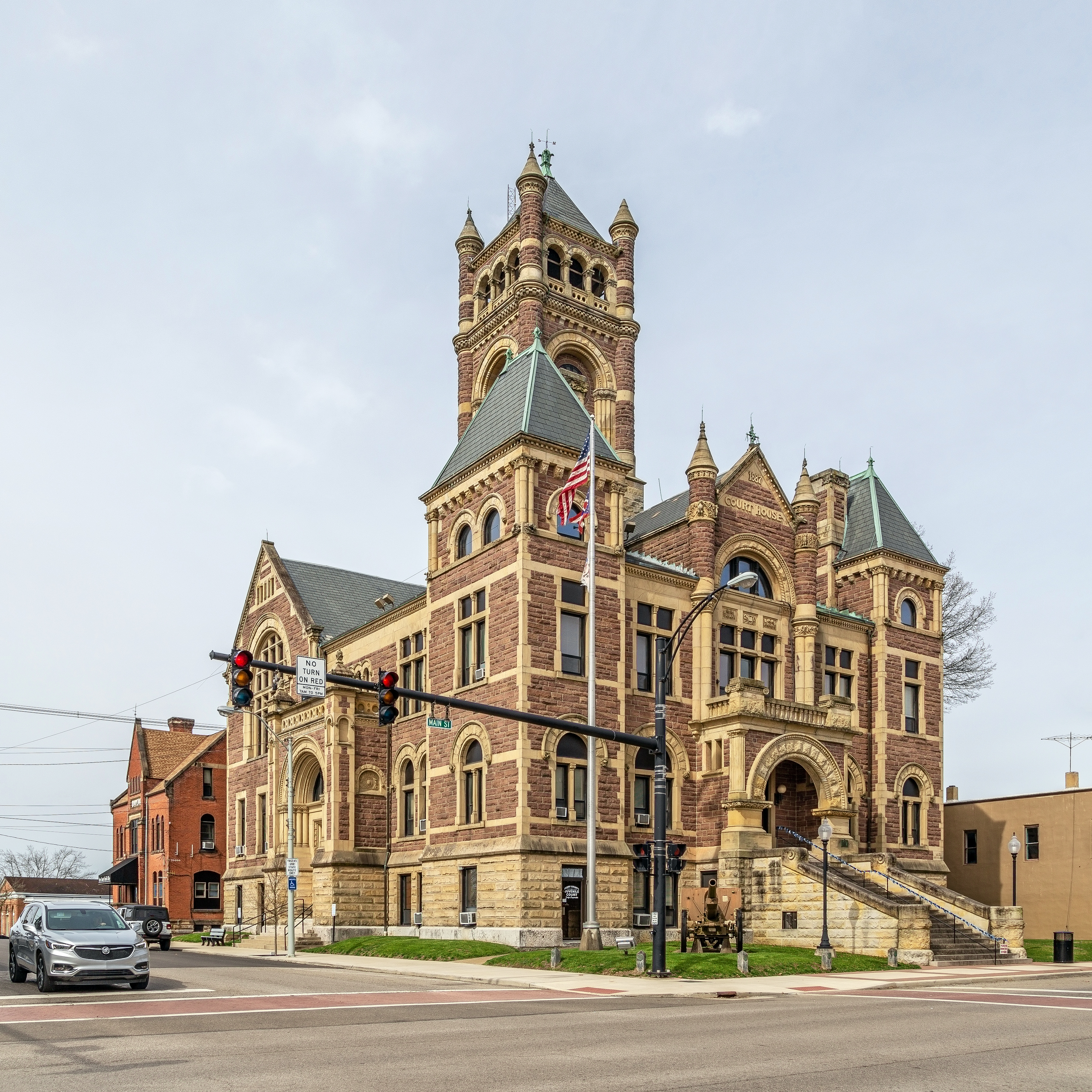
- Perry County Courthouse

- Flag Seal

- Location within the U.S. state of Ohio
- Coordinates: 39°44′N 82°14′W
- Country: United States
- State: Ohio
- Founded: March 1, 1818
- Named for: Oliver Hazard Perry
- Seat: New Lexington
- Largest City: New Lexington

Area
  - Total: 412 sq mi (1,070 km^{2})
  - Land: 408 sq mi (1,060 km^{2})
  - Water: 4.5 sq mi (12 km^{2}) 1.1%

Population (2020)
  - Total: 35,408
  - Estimate (2025): 35,918 ▲
  - Density: 86/sq mi (33/km^{2})
- Time zone: UTC−5 (Eastern)
  - Summer (DST): UTC−4 (EDT)
- Congressional district: 12th
- Website: perrycountyohio.gov

Perry County is a county located in the U.S. state of Ohio. As of the 2020 census, the population was 35,408. Its county seat is New Lexington. It was established on March 1, 1818, from parts of Fairfield, Washington and Muskingum counties. The county is named for Oliver Hazard Perry, a hero of the War of 1812. Perry County is included in the Columbus, OH Metropolitan Statistical Area. One of the poorest counties in the state, this is where the lawsuit challenging Ohio's school funding system, DeRolph v. State, began.

== Geography ==
According to the U.S. Census Bureau, the county has a total area of 412 square miles (1,070 km^{2}), of which 408 square miles (1,060 km^{2}) is land and 4.5 square miles (12 km^{2}) (1.1%) is water.

=== Adjacent counties ===
- Licking County (north)
- Muskingum County (northeast)
- Morgan County (southeast)
- Athens County (south)
- Hocking County (southwest)
- Fairfield County (west)

=== National protected area ===
- Wayne National Forest (part)

== Demographics ==
Historical population
Census	Pop.	Note	%±
1820	8,429		—
1830	13,970		65.7%
1840	19,344		38.5%
1850	20,775		7.4%
1860	19,678		−5.3%
1870	18,453		−6.2%
1880	28,218		52.9%
1890	31,151		10.4%
1900	31,841		2.2%
1910	35,396		11.2%
1920	36,098		2.0%
1930	31,445		−12.9%
1940	31,087		−1.1%
1950	28,999		−6.7%
1960	27,864		−3.9%
1970	27,434		−1.5%
1980	31,032		13.1%
1990	31,557		1.7%
2000	34,078		8.0%
2010	36,058		5.8%
2020	35,408		−1.8%
2025 (est.)	35,918	▲	1.4%
U.S. Decennial Census; 1790-1960 1900-1990; 1990-2000 2020

=== Racial and ethnic composition ===
Perry County, Ohio – Racial and ethnic composition Note: the US Census treats Hispanic/Latino as an ethnic category. This table excludes Latinos from the racial categories and assigns them to a separate category. Hispanics/Latinos may be of any race.
Race / Ethnicity (NH = Non-Hispanic)	Pop 1980	Pop 1990	Pop 2000	Pop 2010	Pop 2020	% 1980	% 1990	% 2000	% 2010	% 2020
White alone (NH)	30,784	31,345	33,473	35,170	33,595	99.20%	99.33%	98.22%	97.54%	94.88%
Black or African American alone (NH)	64	57	73	92	90	0.21%	0.18%	0.21%	0.26%	0.25%
Native American or Alaska Native alone (NH)	16	45	93	86	94	0.05%	0.14%	0.27%	0.24%	0.27%
Asian alone (NH)	19	18	33	37	67	0.06%	0.06%	0.10%	0.10%	0.19%
Native Hawaiian or Pacific Islander alone (NH)	x	x	1	6	0	x	x	0.00%	0.02%	0.00%
Other race alone (NH)	28	11	7	14	85	0.09%	0.03%	0.02%	0.04%	0.24%
Mixed race or Multiracial (NH)	x	x	246	458	1,225	x	x	0.72%	1.27%	3.46%
Hispanic or Latino (any race)	121	81	152	195	252	0.39%	0.26%	0.45%	0.54%	0.71%
Total	31,032	31,557	34,078	36,058	35,408	100.00%	100.00%	100.00%	100.00%	100.00%

=== 2020 census ===
As of the 2020 census, the county had a population of 35,408. The median age was 41.0 years. 23.9% of residents were under the age of 18 and 17.7% of residents were 65 years of age or older. For every 100 females there were 100.3 males, and for every 100 females age 18 and over there were 99.0 males age 18 and over.

The racial makeup of the county was 95.2% White, 0.3% Black or African American, 0.3% American Indian and Alaska Native, 0.2% Asian, <0.1% Native Hawaiian and Pacific Islander, 0.3% from some other race, and 3.8% from two or more races. Hispanic or Latino residents of any race comprised 0.7% of the population.

19.5% of residents lived in urban areas, while 80.5% lived in rural areas.

There were 13,592 households in the county, of which 31.9% had children under the age of 18 living in them. Of all households, 51.3% were married-couple households, 17.3% were households with a male householder and no spouse or partner present, and 22.2% were households with a female householder and no spouse or partner present. About 24.3% of all households were made up of individuals and 11.0% had someone living alone who was 65 years of age or older.

There were 14,962 housing units, of which 9.2% were vacant. Among occupied housing units, 74.7% were owner-occupied and 25.3% were renter-occupied. The homeowner vacancy rate was 1.0% and the rental vacancy rate was 5.0%.

=== 2010 census ===
As of the 2010 United States census, there were 36,058 people, 13,576 households, and 9,738 families living in the county. The population density was 88.4 inhabitants per square mile (34.1/km^{2}). There were 15,211 housing units at an average density of 37.3 units per square mile (14.4 units/km^{2}). The racial makeup of the county was 97.9% white, 0.3% black or African American, 0.2% American Indian, 0.1% Asian, 0.1% from other races, and 1.4% from two or more races. Those of Hispanic or Latino origin made up 0.5% of the population. In terms of ancestry, 25.4% were German, 14.9% were Irish, 10.4% were English, and 9.6% were American.

Of the 13,576 households, 35.7% had children under the age of 18 living with them, 54.3% were married couples living together, 11.6% had a female householder with no husband present, 28.3% were non-families, and 22.8% of all households were made up of individuals. The average household size was 2.63 and the average family size was 3.06. The median age was 38.6 years.

The median income for a household in the county was $42,388 and the median income for a family was $50,489. Males had a median income of $39,305 versus $31,112 for females. The per capita income for the county was $18,916. About 14.2% of families and 18.5% of the population were below the poverty line, including 26.4% of those under age 18 and 8.6% of those age 65 or over.

=== 2000 census ===
As of the census of 2000, there were 34,078 people, 12,500 households, and 9,350 families living in the county. The population density was 83 people per square mile (32 people/km^{2}). There were 13,655 housing units at an average density of 33 units per square mile (13/km^{2}). The racial makeup of the county was 98.54% White, 0.22% Black or African American, 0.28% Native American, 0.10% Asian, 0.01% Pacific Islander, 0.09% from other races, and 0.76% from two or more races. 0.45% of the population were Hispanic or Latino of any race.

There were 12,500 households, out of which 36.7% had children under the age of 18 living with them, 60.1% were married couples living together, 9.8% had a female householder with no husband present, and 25.2% were non-families. 21.4% of all households were made up of individuals, and 9.9% had someone living alone who was 65 years of age or older. The average household size was 2.70 and the average family size was 3.13.

In the county, the population was spread out, with 28.1% under the age of 18, 8.5% from 18 to 24, 29.1% from 25 to 44, 22.3% from 45 to 64, and 12.0% who were 65 years of age or older. The median age was 35 years. For every 100 females there were 98.9 males. For every 100 females age 18 and over, there were 95.4 males.

The median income for a household in the county was $34,383, and the median income for a family was $40,294. Males had a median income of $31,664 versus $21,147 for females. The per capita income for the county was $15,674. About 9.4% of families and 11.8% of the population were below the poverty line, including 15.2% of those under age 18 and 12.70% of those age 65 or over.

== Politics ==
Perry County tended to be a swing county prior to 2016. Bill Clinton was the last Democrat to win this county, a distinction shared with 16 other Ohio counties, in 1996. In 2020, Donald Trump won the largest percentage of votes in the county of any Republican nominee since the party's founding, a feat surpassed by more than two percentage points in 2024.

United States presidential election results for Perry County, Ohio
Year	Republican		Democratic		Third party(ies)	
Year	No.	%	No.	%	No.	%
1856	1,385	37.19%	1,847	49.60%	492	13.21%
1860	1,605	43.51%	1,950	52.86%	134	3.63%
1864	1,824	49.52%	1,859	50.48%	0	0.00%
1868	1,725	46.48%	1,986	53.52%	0	0.00%
1872	1,907	46.67%	2,172	53.16%	7	0.17%
1876	2,084	40.22%	2,810	54.24%	287	5.54%
1880	2,676	42.84%	3,187	51.02%	384	6.15%
1884	3,222	48.19%	3,114	46.57%	350	5.23%
1888	3,528	49.16%	3,474	48.40%	175	2.44%
1892	3,359	47.11%	3,430	48.11%	341	4.78%
1896	3,989	48.63%	4,112	50.13%	102	1.24%
1900	4,180	52.59%	3,599	45.28%	170	2.14%
1904	4,883	60.32%	2,846	35.16%	366	4.52%
1908	4,304	49.48%	3,885	44.67%	509	5.85%
1912	1,739	21.60%	3,147	39.08%	3,166	39.32%
1916	3,953	47.85%	3,860	46.73%	448	5.42%
1920	7,685	54.82%	5,917	42.21%	416	2.97%
1924	7,592	58.11%	3,702	28.34%	1,771	13.56%
1928	8,551	64.39%	4,653	35.04%	75	0.56%
1932	7,225	49.34%	6,714	45.85%	704	4.81%
1936	6,826	43.24%	8,508	53.90%	451	2.86%
1940	8,656	55.46%	6,953	44.54%	0	0.00%
1944	7,339	59.24%	5,050	40.76%	0	0.00%
1948	5,692	51.78%	5,264	47.89%	36	0.33%
1952	7,425	58.46%	5,275	41.54%	0	0.00%
1956	7,511	64.56%	4,123	35.44%	0	0.00%
1960	7,658	59.60%	5,191	40.40%	0	0.00%
1964	3,895	33.26%	7,816	66.74%	0	0.00%
1968	4,815	44.96%	4,811	44.92%	1,084	10.12%
1972	6,716	62.13%	3,728	34.49%	365	3.38%
1976	5,637	46.44%	6,268	51.64%	233	1.92%
1980	5,725	53.77%	4,383	41.16%	540	5.07%
1984	7,548	65.09%	3,961	34.16%	88	0.76%
1988	6,602	56.28%	5,011	42.72%	118	1.01%
1992	4,712	34.78%	4,972	36.70%	3,863	28.52%
1996	4,606	37.00%	5,819	46.75%	2,022	16.24%
2000	6,440	50.20%	5,895	45.95%	493	3.84%
2004	7,856	51.72%	7,257	47.78%	76	0.50%
2008	7,721	50.02%	7,261	47.04%	455	2.95%
2012	7,627	50.78%	7,033	46.82%	360	2.40%
2016	10,228	67.73%	4,138	27.40%	735	4.87%
2020	12,357	74.10%	4,098	24.57%	221	1.33%
2024	13,062	76.81%	3,800	22.35%	143	0.84%

United States Senate election results for Perry County, Ohio1
Year	Republican		Democratic		Third party(ies)	
Year	No.	%	No.	%	No.	%
2024	11,626	69.32%	4,492	26.78%	654	3.90%

== Transportation ==
The Perry County Airport is located two nautical miles (2.3 mi; 3.7 km) south of New Lexington's central business district.

== Communities ==
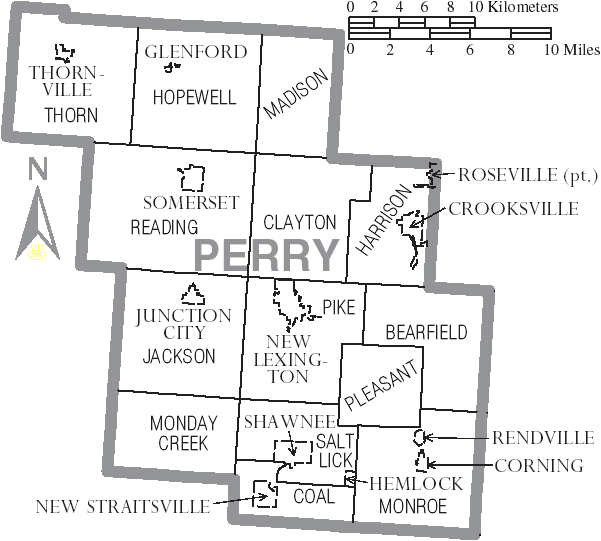
Map of Perry County, Ohio with municipal and township labels

=== Villages ===
- Corning
- Crooksville
- Glenford
- Hemlock
- Junction City
- New Lexington (county seat)
- New Straitsville
- Rendville
- Roseville (partial)
- Shawnee
- Somerset (former county seat)
- Thornville

=== Townships ===
- Bearfield
- Clayton
- Coal
- Harrison
- Hopewell
- Jackson
- Madison
- Monday Creek
- Monroe
- Pike
- Pleasant
- Reading
- Salt Lick
- Thorn

=== Census-designated places ===
- Rose Farm
- Thornport

=== Unincorporated communities ===
- Bristol
- Buckingham
- Chalfants
- Chapel Hill
- Clarksville
- Crossenville
- McCuneville
- McLuney
- Millertown
- Milligan
- Mount Perry
- Moxahala
- New Reading
- Oakfield
- Portersville, Ohio
- Rehoboth
- Saltillo
- Sego
- Sulphur Springs

=== Ghost towns ===
- Dicksonton
- San Toy

== See also ==
- National Register of Historic Places listings in Perry County, Ohio

Media

- Perry County has its own newspaper called the Perry County Tribune.
