= Ohio State Route 668 =

State highway in central Ohio, US

State Route 668

Route information
- Maintained by ODOT
- Length: 29.24 mi (47.06 km)
- Existed: 1937–present

Major junctions
- South end: SR 93 near Logan
- US 22 in Somerset; I-70 near Brownsville
- North end: US 40 in Brownsville

Location
- Country: United States
- State: Ohio
- Counties: Hocking, Perry, Licking

Highway system
- Ohio State Highway System; Interstate; US; State; Scenic
← SR 666	→ SR 669

State Route 668 (SR 668) is a north-south state highway in central Ohio. Its southern terminus is at an intersection with SR 93 in the Wayne National Forest, northeast of Logan; its northern terminus is at an intersection with US 40 in the unincorporated community of Brownsville.

== Route description ==
SR 668 begins at SR 93 in Falls Township, about 5 miles (8.0 km) northeast of Logan. The route heads north and almost immediately exits Hocking County and enters Perry County. For the first 4 miles (6.4 km) of the route, the route is also within the boundaries of the Wayne National Forest. The route reaches Junction City and reaches SR 37 in the center of town. The two routes run together west on Main Street out of town. Shortly after leaving the village, the two routes separate, SR 37 continues west while SR 668 heads north. Upon entering Somerset, the road name becomes Market Street and eventually reaches US 22 (Main Street). SR 668 turns right onto US 22 and the two routes head towards the center of Somerset. SR 13 (Columbus Street) intersects Main Street at a traffic circle in the center of town. The circle houses a memorial to General Philip Sheridan who was born in Somerset. At the eastern village limits, SR 668 splits from US 22 and heads north. North of Somerset, there is a stop-controlled intersection with SR 204 where only travelers on SR 668 must stop. The route then passes a former railroad and makes a sharp turn towards the southeast at Hopewell Township Road 65. It heads up the side of a hill as it gradually curves back to the north. The route passes the Suburban Landfill before it exits Perry County and enters Licking County. After entering Licking County, SR 668 reaches a partial interchange with I-70. Known as exit 141 on I-70, the interchange only provides eastbound travelers on I-70 the opportunity to connect to SR 668 and access to I-70 westbound only from SR 668. After I-70, the route enters the unincorporated community of Brownsville (within Bowling Green Township). SR 668 comes to an end at an intersection with US 40 (National Road). Travelers that need to access I-70 eastbound can head east on US 40 and access I-70 in the nearby village of Gratiot.

== History ==
SR 668 was brought into the state highway system in 1937 on a route longer than it runs today. At its first designation, the route ran from SR 75 (now SR 93) near Logan, past Brownsville on Brownsville Road (now County Road 668) to SR 16 near Hanover. One year later, SR 668 took over the entire route of SR 207; SR 668 shared a short concurrency west on SR 16, went northeast into Hanover and Perryton, and traveled north to its end at SR 79 near Fallsburg. By 1959, the route was shortened to its current length.

== Major junctions ==
County	Location	mi	km	Destinations	Notes
Hocking	Falls Township	0.00	0.00	SR 93 – Logan, New Straitsville	
Perry	Junction City	10.35	16.66	SR 37 east (Main Street) / Logan Street – New Lexington	Southern end of SR 37 concurrency
Perry	Jackson Township	11.16	17.96	SR 37 west – Lancaster	Northern end of SR 37 concurrency
Perry	Somerset	17.04	27.42	US 22 west (West Main Street) / North Market Street – Rushville, Lancaster	Southern end of US 22 concurrency
Perry	Somerset	17.21	27.70	SR 13 (Columbus Street)	Traffic circle
Perry	Somerset	17.80	28.65	US 22 east – Zanesville	Northern end of US 22 concurrency
Perry	Hopewell Township	22.93	36.90	SR 204 – Glenford, Mount Perry	
Licking	Bowling Green Township	28.43	45.75	I-70 west – Columbus	Exit 141 (I-70); access from eastbound I-70 / to westbound I-70 only
Licking	Bowling Green Township	29.24	47.06	US 40 (National Road) to I-70 east / Third Street – Hebron, Gratiot, Zanesville, Flint Ridge	
1.000 mi = 1.609 km; 1.000 km = 0.621 mi: Concurrency terminus; Incomplete access
