= Ohio State Route 37 =

State highway in Ohio, US

State Route 37
- Route of SR 37 highlighted in red

Route information
- Maintained by ODOT
- Length: 174.21 mi (280.36 km)
- Existed: 1924–present

Major junctions
- West end: US 224 / SR 12 in Findlay
- SR 15 in Findlay; US 30 in Forest; US 23 in Delaware; US 36 from Delaware to Sunbury; I-71 near Sunbury; US 62 in Johnstown; US 40 near Hebron; I-70 near Hebron; US 22 near Lancaster; SR 13 / SR 93 in New Lexington
- East end: SR 60 / SR 78 in McConnelsville

Location
- Country: United States
- State: Ohio
- Counties: Hancock, Hardin, Wyandot, Marion, Union, Delaware, Licking, Fairfield, Perry, Morgan

Highway system
- Ohio State Highway System; Interstate; US; State; Scenic
| ← SR 36 | → SR 38 |

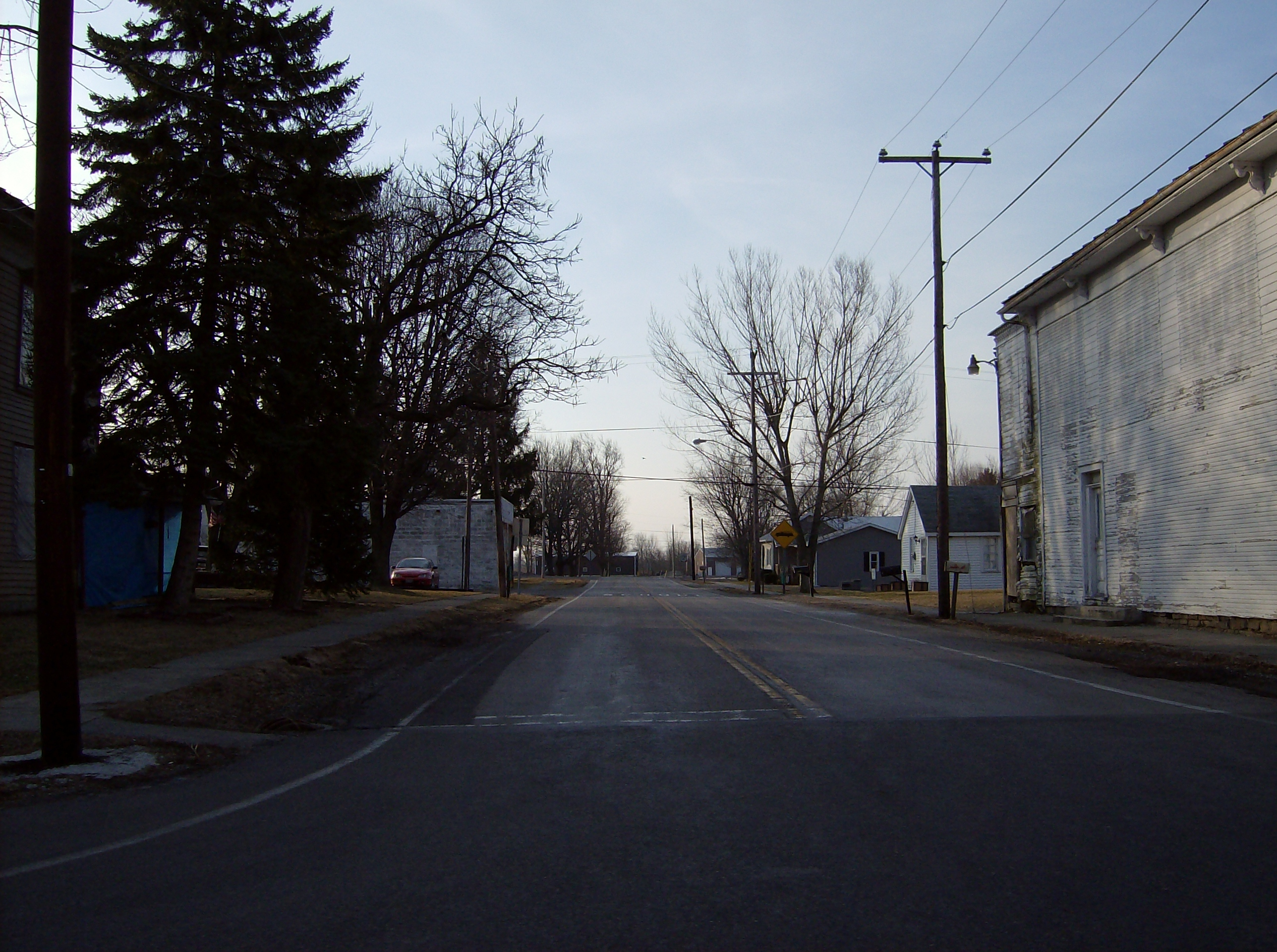
Along State Route 37 at Marseilles in Wyandot County.

State Route 37 (SR 37) is a northwest–southeast highway (signed east–west) in Ohio. It is the ninth longest state route in Ohio. Its western terminus is at U.S. Route 224 and SR 12 in Findlay, and its eastern terminus is at SR 60 and SR 78 in McConnelsville.

== History ==
State Route 37 is an original state highway that went from Lancaster to Marietta. In 1932, the route was extended to Findlay along its current route. In 1935, its eastern terminus was shortened to its current terminus, giving that route to State Route 78 and the now defunct State Route 77 (now part of State Route 60).

== Major junctions ==
| County | Location | mi | km | Destinations | Notes |
|---|---|---|---|---|---|
| Hancock | Findlay | 0.00 | 0.00 | US 224 (Main Street / Center Street) / SR 12 east | Western end of SR 12 concurrency |
| Hancock | Findlay | 0.34 | 0.55 | SR 12 west (Main Street / Main Cross Street) / SR 568 begins to I-75 | Eastern end of SR 12 concurrency; western end of SR 568 concurrency |
| Hancock | Findlay | 0.49 | 0.79 | SR 568 east (Sandusky Street) | Eastern end of SR 568 concurrency |
| Hancock | Jackson Township | 6.16– 6.32 | 9.91– 10.17 | SR 15 – Findlay, Carey | Interchange |
| Hancock | Amanda Township | 11.12 | 17.90 | SR 103 east / T-133 – Carey | Western end of SR 103 concurrency |
| Hancock | Mount Blanchard–Delaware Township municipal line | 13.19 | 21.23 | SR 103 west / CR 17 – Arlington | Eastern end of SR 103 concurrency |
| Hancock | Delaware Township | 19.40– 19.61 | 31.22– 31.56 | US 30 – Fort Wayne, Ind., Mansfield | Interchange |
| Hardin | Forest | 21.53 | 34.65 | SR 53 south (Mad River Street) | Western end of SR 53 concurrency |
| Wyandot | Jackson Township | 22.87 | 36.81 | SR 53 north / Township Highway 84 – Upper Sandusky | Eastern end of SR 53 concurrency |
| Wyandot | Jackson Township | 28.38 | 45.67 | SR 294 east / CR 70 – Harpster | Western terminus of SR 294 |
| Wyandot | Marseilles Township | 31.54 | 50.76 | SR 67 south – Kenton | Western end of SR 67 concurrency |
| Wyandot | Marseilles | 31.77 | 51.13 | SR 67 north / Center Street – Upper Sandusky | Eastern end of SR 67 concurrency |
| Marion | Grand–Montgomery township line | 36.15 | 58.18 | SR 309 (Harding Highway) – Marion, Kenton | |
| Marion | La Rue | 41.02 | 66.02 | SR 95 east (Market Street) | Western terminus of SR 95 |
| Union | Jackson Township | 48.57 | 78.17 | SR 739 south – Byhalia | Western end of SR 739 concurrency |
| Union | Jackson Township | 48.82 | 78.57 | SR 739 north / CR 323 – Marion | Eastern end of SR 739 concurrency |
| Union | Richwood | 52.83 | 85.02 | SR 47 east (Blagrove Street) | Western end of SR 47 concurrency |
| Union | Richwood | 52.90 | 85.13 | SR 47 west (Ottawa Street) | Eastern end of SR 47 concurrency |
| Union | Claibourne Township | 55.76 | 89.74 | SR 4 north – Marion | Western end of SR 4 concurrency |
| Union | Leesburg Township | 56.72 | 91.28 | SR 4 south – Marysville | Eastern end of SR 4 concurrency |
| Union | Leesburg Township | 59.65 | 96.00 | SR 347 west – East Liberty | Eastern terminus of SR 347 |
| Delaware | Scioto Township | 64.84 | 104.35 | SR 257 – Prospect | |
| Delaware | Radnor–Delaware township line | 67.51 | 108.65 | SR 203 north / CR 5 (South Section Line Road) – Radnor, Prospect | Southern terminus of SR 203 |
| Delaware | Delaware | 70.93 | 114.15 | SR 521 east (Sandusky Street) | Western terminus of SR 521 |
| Delaware | Delaware | 71.05– 71.10 | 114.34– 114.42 | US 23 north – Marion | Interchange; northbound US 23 entrance / southbound US 23 exit only |
| Delaware | Delaware | 71.38 | 114.87 | US 42 (Lake Street) | |
| Delaware | Delaware | 72.02 | 115.90 | US 36 west (East William Street) / SR 521 west | Western end of US 36 / SR 521 concurrencies |
| Delaware | Delaware | 72.50 | 116.68 | SR 521 east / Mill Road Crossing | Eastern end of SR 521 concurrency |
| Delaware | Berkshire Township | 78.68– 78.80 | 126.62– 126.82 | I-71 – Columbus, Cleveland | Exit 131 (I-71) |
| Delaware | Sunbury | 82.51 | 132.79 | US 36 east / SR 3 / SR 61 north (State Street) – Centerburg, Mount Vernon, Columbus | Eastern end of US 36 concurrency; southern terminus of SR 61 |
| Delaware | Trenton Township | 86.51 | 139.22 | SR 605 south / CR 605 – New Albany | Northern terminus of SR 605 |
| Licking | Johnstown | 94.29 | 151.75 | US 62 (Coshocton Street) | |
| Licking | Liberty Township | 96.68 | 155.59 | SR 310 south / T-96 – Pataskala | Northern terminus of SR 310 |
| Licking | St. Albans Township | 101.38– 101.87 | 163.16– 163.94 | SR 161 west / CR 39 (York Road) – Columbus | Interchange; eastern terminus of SR 161 |
| Licking | St. Albans Township | | | Western end of freeway | |
| Licking | Granville Township | 105.52– 105.86 | 169.82– 170.37 | SR 16 west / Columbus Road – Columbus, Granville | Interchange; western end of SR 16 concurrency |
| Licking | Granville Township | 106.08– 106.27 | 170.72– 171.02 | SR 16 east / SR 661 north (Lancaster Road) – Newark, Granville | Interchange; eastern end of SR 16 concurrency; southern terminus of SR 661 |
| Licking | Granville Township | | | Eastern end of freeway | |
| Licking | Union Township | 113.29 | 182.32 | US 40 (National Road) – Hebron, Kirkersville | |
| Licking | Union Township | 114.34– 114.49 | 184.01– 184.25 | I-70 – Columbus, Wheeling, W.Va. | Exit 126 (I-70) |
| Licking–Fairfield county line | Union–Walnut township line | 115.49 | 185.86 | SR 79 north – Buckeye Lake | Southern terminus of SR 79 |
| Fairfield | Walnut Township | 117.74 | 189.48 | SR 204 – Millersburg, Reynoldsburg | |
| Fairfield | Walnut Township | 121.83 | 196.07 | SR 256 – Thurston, Baltimore | |
| Fairfield | Lancaster | 131.07 | 210.94 | US 22 west / SR 158 north / SR 188 west (Main Street) / High Street | Western end of US 22 / SR 188 concurrencies; southern terminus of SR 158 |
| Fairfield | Lancaster | 131.91 | 212.29 | SR 188 east (Cherry Street) | Eastern end of SR 188 concurrency |
| Fairfield | Lancaster–Pleasant Township municipal line | 134.72 | 216.81 | US 22 east | Eastern end of US 22 concurrency |
| Fairfield | Rush Creek Township | 140.50 | 226.11 | SR 664 – Rushville, Bremen | |
| Perry | Jackson Township | 146.57 | 235.88 | SR 668 north – Somerset | Western end of SR 668 concurrency |
| Perry | Junction City | 147.38 | 237.19 | SR 668 south (Logan Street) | Eastern end of SR 668 concurrency |
| Perry | New Lexington | 152.28 | 245.07 | SR 13 north | Western end of SR 13 concurrency |
| Perry | New Lexington | 152.73 | 245.80 | SR 345 north (West Broadway Street) / Monument Street | Southern terminus of SR 345 |
| Perry | New Lexington | 153.39 | 246.86 | SR 93 south (Main Street) | Western end of SR 93 concurrency |
| Perry | Bearfield Township | 158.71 | 255.42 | SR 13 south / SR 93 north – Crooksville, Corning | Eastern end of SR 13 / SR 93 concurrencies |
| Perry | Bearfield Township | 163.97 | 263.88 | SR 555 north – Deavertown | Western end of SR 555 concurrency |
| Morgan | Deerfield Township | 164.49 | 264.72 | SR 555 south – Chesterhill | Eastern end of SR 555 concurrency |
| Morgan | Malta Township | 172.75 | 278.01 | SR 78 west – Glouster, Sharpsburg | Western end of SR 78 concurrency |
| Morgan | Malta | 174.00 | 280.03 | SR 669 west (Main Street) – Deavertown | Eastern terminus of SR 669 |
| Morgan | McConnelsville | 174.21 | 280.36 | SR 60 / SR 78 east – Zanesville, Beverly, Caldwell, Marietta | Eastern end of SR 78 concurrency |
1.000 mi = 1.609 km; 1.000 km = 0.621 mi: Concurrency terminus; Incomplete access
