= Ohio State Route 204 =

State highway in central Ohio, US

State Route 204

Route information
- Maintained by ODOT
- Length: 37.79 mi (60.82 km)
- Existed: 1924–present

Major junctions
- West end: SR 256 in Pickerington
- SR 310 near Pataskala
- East end: US 22 near Mount Perry

Location
- Country: United States
- State: Ohio
- Counties: Fairfield, Perry

Highway system
- Ohio State Highway System; Interstate; US; State; Scenic
← SR 203	→ SR 205

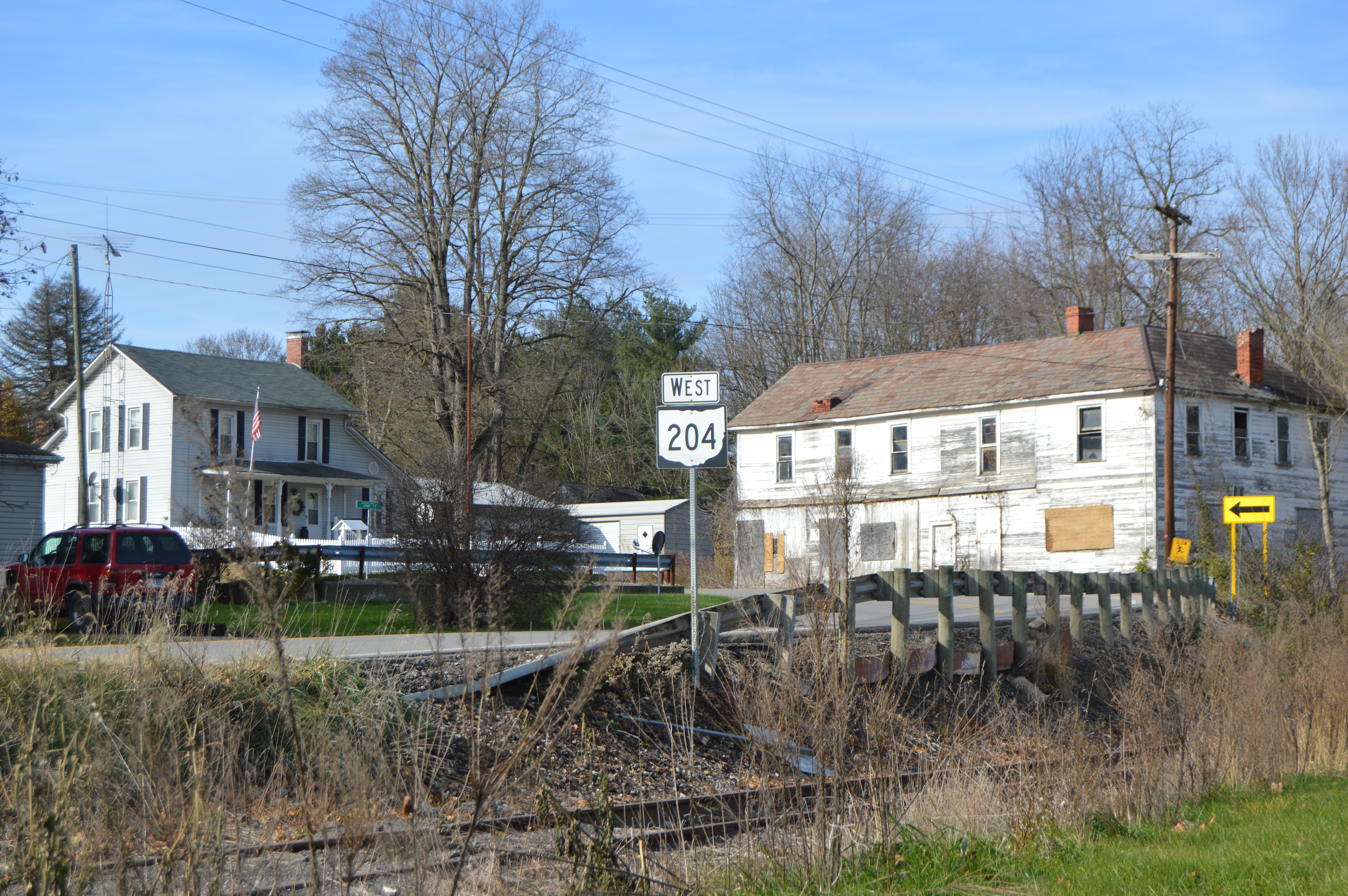
Scene on State Route 204 in Mount Perry

State Route 204 (SR 204) is a state route in central Ohio. It starts at SR 256 in Pickerington, and ends at US 22 near Mount Perry. At a length of 37.79 miles (60.82 km), the route is located parallel to Interstate 70 in Fairfield and Perry counties east of Columbus, the state capital.

== History ==
SR 204 was designated in 1923 on what was formerly SR 470 (which existed since 1915) between SR 79 (current SR 37) and SR 40, US 22's predecessor. In 1937, SR 204 was extended west along local roads and SR 386 to SR 256. Since then, no major, functional changes have occurred to the routing.

== Major intersections ==
County	Location	mi	km	Destinations	Notes
Fairfield	Pickerington	0.00	0.00	SR 256 (Reynoldsburg–Baltimore Road / Hill Road) to Tussing Road / I-70	
Fairfield	Violet Township	0.81	1.30	SR 204A	
Fairfield	Liberty Township	5.81	9.35	SR 310 north (Hazelton–Etna Road) – Pataskala	Southern terminus of SR 310
Fairfield	Liberty Township	11.16	17.96	SR 158 (Lancaster–Kirkersville Road) – Kirkersville, Baltimore	
Fairfield	Walnut Township	13.31	21.42	SR 37 (Lancaster–Newark Road) – Granville, Lancaster	
Perry	Thornville	21.56	34.70	SR 188 west / CR 30 (Main Street)	Eastern terminus of SR 188
Perry	Thorn Township	22.28	35.86	SR 13 – Newark, Somerset	
Perry	Hopewell Township	28.55	45.95	SR 757 south (Mill Street) – Somerset	Northern terminus of SR 757
Perry	Hopewell Township	33.01	53.12	SR 668 – Brownsville, Somerset	
Perry	Madison Township	37.79	60.82	US 22 / Township Road 49 – Zanesville, Somerset	
1.000 mi = 1.609 km; 1.000 km = 0.621 mi

== State Route 204A ==
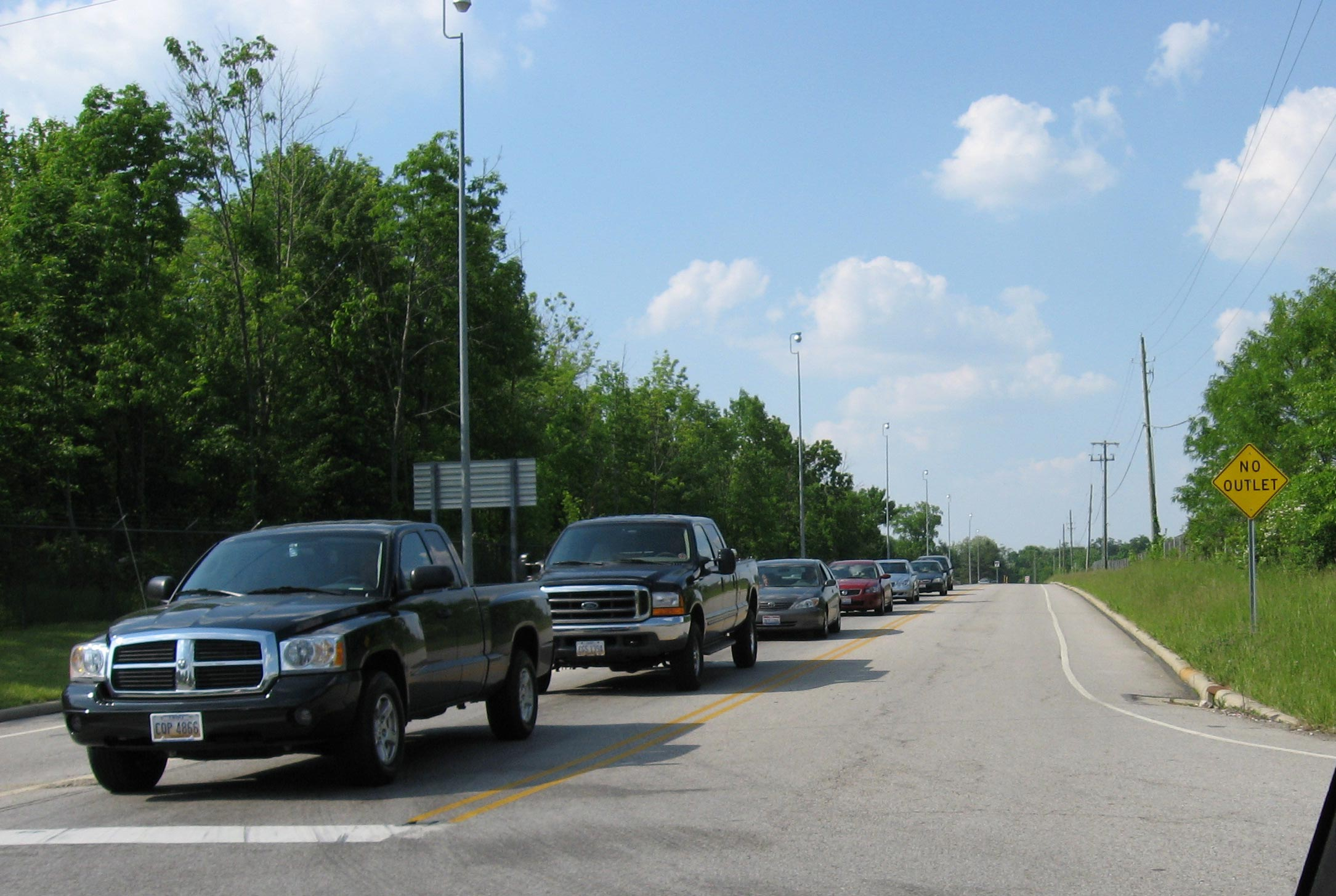
The entire length of Ohio State Route 204A

State Route 204A is a 0.49-mile alternate route connecting I-70 with SR 204 in Pickerington. Route 204A runs south from I-70 to SR 204, connecting the two parallel roads. Route 204A also serves as the off ramp for I-70 until it becomes Taylor Road and intersects SR 204. A No Outlet sign is posted because the I-70 off ramp is southbound only and there is no access northbound to I-70.
