= Interstate 70 in Ohio =

Interstate Highway in Ohio, United States

Interstate 70
- I-70 highlighted in red

Route information
- Maintained by ODOT
- Length: 225.60 mi (363.07 km)
- Existed: 1956–present
- NHS: Entire route

Major junctions
- West end: I-70 / US 35 at the Indiana state line in New Paris
- I-75 near Vandalia; I-675 near Springfield; I-270 in Columbus; I-670 in Columbus; I-71 / SR 315 in Columbus; I-270 in Columbus; I-77 near Cambridge; I-470 near St. Clairsville
- East end: I-70 at the West Virginia state line in Bridgeport

Location
- Country: United States
- State: Ohio
- Counties: Preble, Montgomery, Clark, Madison, Franklin, Fairfield, Licking, Muskingum, Guernsey, Belmont

Highway system
- Interstate Highway System; Main; Auxiliary; Suffixed; Business; Future; Ohio State Highway System; Interstate; US; State; Scenic
← SR 69	→ SR 70

Interstate 70 (I-70) in the US state of Ohio provides access between Indiana and West Virginia. I-70 is a major highway for traffic within, to, from, and through Ohio. The highway is a core roadway of the Columbus metropolitan area and is of additional importance in the Dayton metropolitan area.

== Route description ==
Along its path through Ohio, I-70 passes through the following counties: Preble, Montgomery, Clark, Madison, Franklin, Fairfield, Licking, Muskingum, Guernsey, and Belmont. As an Interstate Highway, by default, I-70 is a part of the National Highway System, a network of highways deemed most important for the country's economy, mobility, and defense.

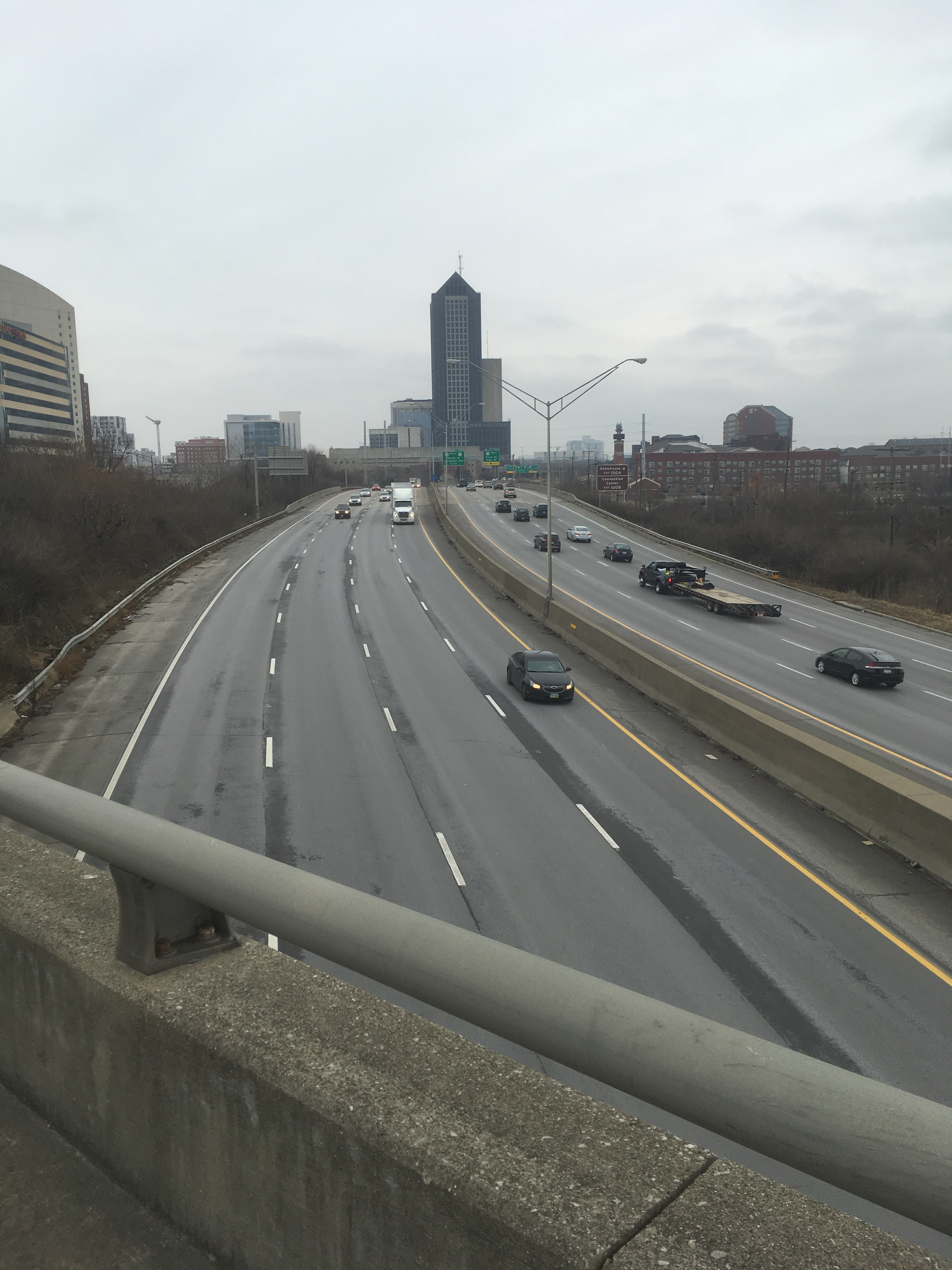
View of I-70 looking east from a pedestrian bridge in Columbus

The portion of I-70 between I-675 and Enon Road in Clark County is designated as the "Deputy Suzanne Hopper Memorial Highway", in honor of a Clark County Sheriff's deputy who was shot and killed on January 1, 2011, while responding to reports of gunshots at a mobile home park on Enon Road, near I-70.

The portion of I-70 between milemarkers 51 and 53 in Clark County is designated as the "Trooper Charles V. Vogel, Jr. Memorial Highway", in honor of a trooper with the Springfield post of the Ohio State Highway Patrol who was struck and killed by a vehicle on January 24, 1980, while investigating a crash at the junction of I-70 and U.S. Route 68 (US 68; which is located along the designated stretch of highway).

=== Western Ohio ===
I-70's first exit within Ohio is in New Westville, just south of New Paris. The exit is only accessible eastbound, and traffic going on to I-70 using the exit-only enters westbound lanes. I-70 goes on to pass Gettysburg before making two exits near Lewisburg, one at a junction with US 127 and another near downtown Lewisburg. I-70 also makes an exit in Brookville and runs concurrent with State Route 49 (SH 49) for just under 1.5 miles (2.4 km) before SH 49 continues to the southeast.

At this point, I-70 comes its closest to Dayton and primarily serves rural suburbs. Within the northern Dayton section of I-70, a separate series of ramps serves traffic to Dayton International Airport before entering a major intersection with I-75 just south of Vandalia. From there, I-70 continues to serve northern Dayton suburbs and also junctions the SH 4 expressway, which runs concurrent with I-70 between Wright-Patterson Air Force Base and Enon, and I-675, a bypass route of Downtown Dayton.

After another interchange with US 68, I-70 passes south of Springfield and serves three exits, the easternmost of which serves as one of the many junctions I-70 has with the National Road (today known as US 40).

=== Central Ohio ===
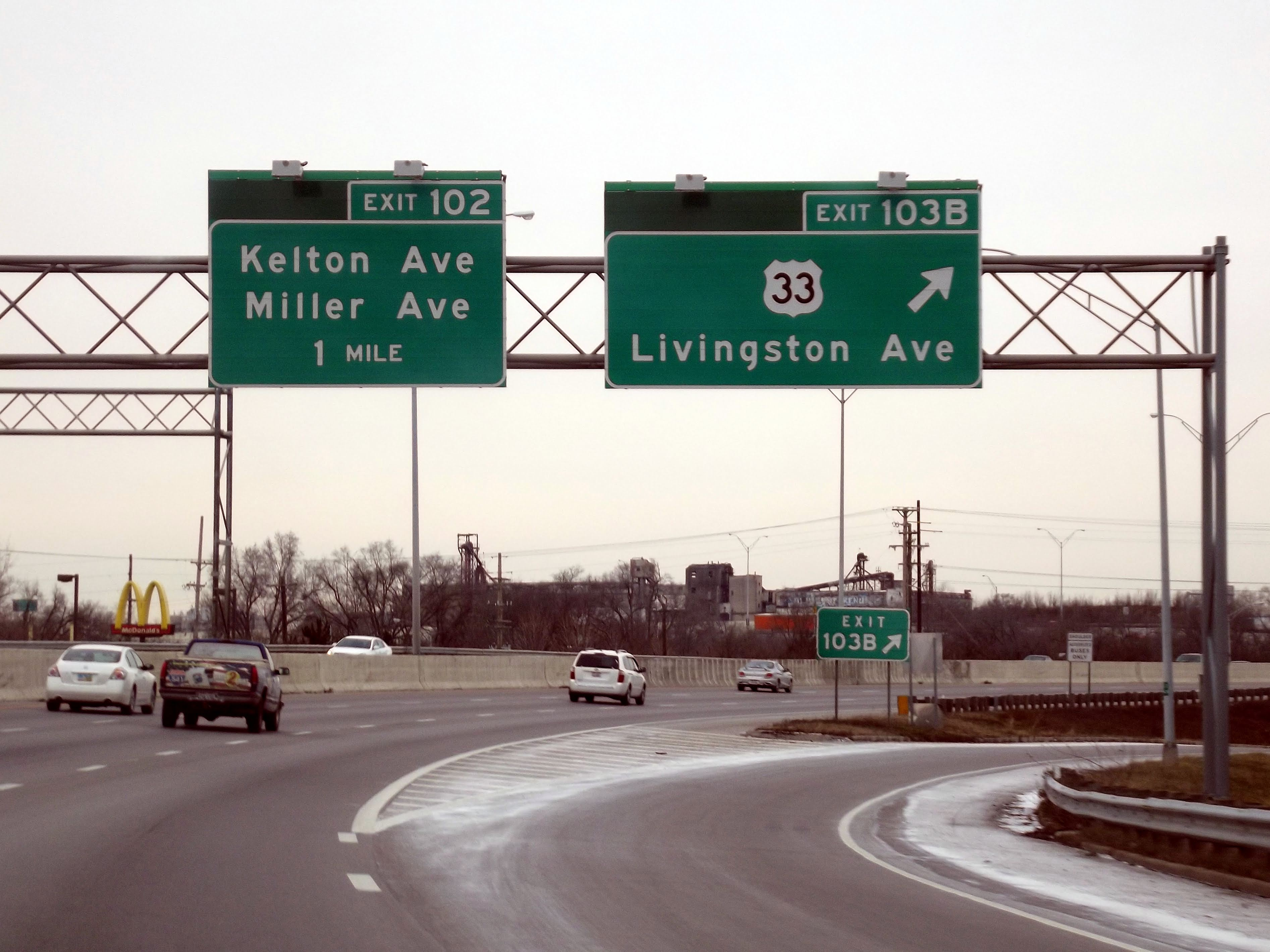
Westbound at US 33 in Columbus

I-70 is a major freeway within the Columbus metropolitan area, serving as the primary east–west route. After brief exits just outside the towns of Summerford and West Jefferson, I-70 reaches the southern part of Hilliard, where I-70 makes its first junction with I-270, a ring road around the Columbus area primarily serving its suburbs. Between the I-270 interchanges on I-70, hazmats are prohibited. I-70 continues toward Downtown Columbus and, upon entering Valleyview, reaches I-670, a highway serving north-central Columbus as well as both Easton Town Center and John Glenn Columbus International Airport. I-70 itself continues south and meets up with I-71 and SH 315 in a major interchange to the east of Franklinton. For just over 1.5 miles (2.4 km), I-71 and I-70 run concurrently in south Downtown Columbus before I-70 separates and continues east for about nine miles (14 km) before reaching I-270's eastern interchange with I-70, but not before serving three exits in the Bexley area and an interchange with US 33. Throughout the rest of the route in central Ohio, I-70 serves state routes and rural towns like Kirkersville and Buckeye Lake.

I-70 is also the only major expressway within the Zanesville area and bisects the central business district and serves the area with exits to both the central business district and Zanesville Municipal Airport. Once I-70 passes outside of Zanesville, the road connects with Norwich and New Concord, the latter of which also includes Muskingum University and the John and Annie Glenn Museum.

=== Eastern Ohio ===
Running roughly parallel with both US 22 and US 40, I-70 passes through New Concord to serve Cambridge, which is also where I-70 interchanges with I-77. Between the I-77 interchange and St. Clairsville, I-70 is a rural highway with few exits serving small towns along its path.

In St. Clairsville, I-70 connects with the Ohio Valley Mall and is less than 10 miles (16 km) from Wheeling, West Virginia. Eastbound traffic can either continue on I-70 toward Wheeling's central business district or use I-470 as a bypass of Wheeling. I-70 itself serves a few more exits in Wheeling's western area before crossing the Fort Henry Bridge and the state line into downtown Wheeling.

== History ==
I-70 appeared on the original American Association of State Highway and Transportation Officials (AASHTO) interstate route numbering map from August 14, 1957. It was envisioned as a modern upgrade of the old National Road (US 40), the main east–west route through the heart of the state, built closely parallel to, but on a separate alignment from, the then overburdened and obsolete highway. The 21-mile (34 km) section between Kirkersville and Gratiot (current exits 122–142) was the first new construction opened to traffic in 1959. At that time, the highway was accessed at both ends via temporary at-grade intersections with the old National Pike, with I-70 and US 40 sharing the same carriageways.

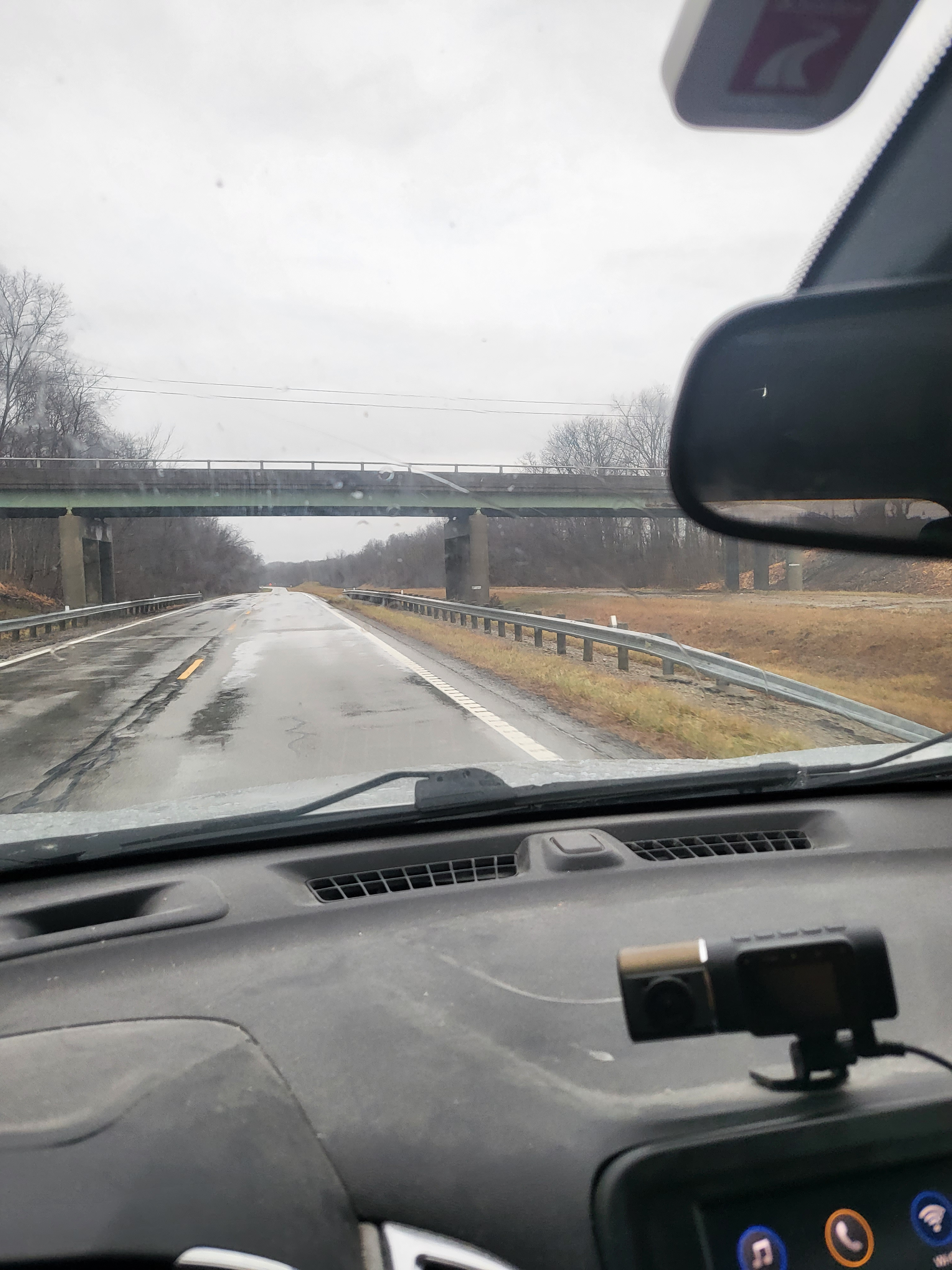
The northern end of SR 158 that once served as a connecting road between I-70 and US 40 with westbound grading and Interstate-style bridge

Once the road was extended westward toward Columbus by 1968, access was routed to exit 122, with the western one-mile (1.6 km) access road continuing US 40 back to the old National Pike becoming part of SR 158 (though the westbound lanes were abandoned), with SH 158's old alignment north of the access road being turned over to Licking County. The following year, the highway was opened eastward to Zanesville, with a new interchange, exit 142, at Gratiot. The at-grade intersection with the old National Pike was subsequently blocked off, to be erased by years of overgrowth. The US 40 designation was returned to the Pike around the same time, replacing the temporary SR 440 designation.

In February 2013, an 11.18-mile (17.99 km) segment of I-70 traveling through Franklin, Fairfield, and Licking counties was named by the National Asphalt Pavement Association as the winner of the 2012 Sheldon G. Hayes Award for the best asphalt pavement in the country.

== Exit list ==
County	Location	mi	km	Exit	Destinations	Notes
Preble	Jefferson Township	0.00	0.00		I-70 west / US 35 north – Indianapolis	Continuation into Indiana
Preble	Jefferson Township	1.83	2.95	1	US 35 east – Eaton	Eastern end of US 35 concurrency; eastbound exit and westbound entrance
Preble	Monroe Township	9.91	15.95	10	US 127 – Greenville, Eaton	
Preble	Harrison Township	14.66	23.59	14	SR 503 – West Alexandria, Lewisburg	
Montgomery	Brookville	21.01	33.81	21	Arlington Road – Brookville	
Montgomery	Clay Township	23.71– 24.05	38.16– 38.70	24	SR 49 north – Phillipsburg, Greenville	Western end of SR 49 concurrency; eastbound access to SR 49 via Brookville Salem Pike
Montgomery	Clayton–Englewood line	25.88– 26.26	41.65– 42.26	26	SR 49 south – Clayton, Trotwood Hoke Road to SR 49 – Trotwood	Eastbound signage; eastern end of SR 49 concurrency Westbound signage
Montgomery	Englewood	28.97	46.62	29	SR 48 – Englewood, Clayton	
Montgomery	Butler Township	32.08	51.63	32	To US 40 – Vandalia, Dayton International Airport	
Montgomery	Butler Township	33.72– 33.97	54.27– 54.67	33	I-75 – Dayton, Toledo	Signed as exits 33A (south) and 33B (north) eastbound; I-75 north exit 61; south exits 61A-B
Montgomery	Huber Heights	36.67	59.01	36	SR 202 – Huber Heights	
Montgomery	Huber Heights	38.64	62.19	38	SR 201 – Huber Heights	
Montgomery–Clark county line	Huber Heights	41.00	65.98	41	SR 4 south / SR 235 – Fairborn, New Carlisle	Western end of SR 4 concurrency
Clark	Mad River Township	44.33	71.34	44	I-675 south / Spangler Road – Cincinnati	I-675 exits 26A-B; northern terminus of I-675; signed as exits 44A (I-675 south) and 44B (Spangler Road) on collector-distributor lanes
Clark	Mad River Township	47.29	76.11	47	SR 4 – Enon, Springfield	Eastern end of SR 4 concurrency; Eastbound exit and westbound entrance
Clark	Mad River Township	47.79	76.91	48	Enon, Donnelsville	Westbound exit and eastbound entrance
Clark	Mad River–Springfield township line	52.23	84.06	52	US 68 – Xenia, Urbana	Signed as exits 52A (south) and 52B (north)
Clark	Springfield	54.47	87.66	54	SR 72 – Springfield	
Clark	Springfield	59.36	95.53	59	SR 41 – South Charleston	
Clark	Harmony Township	62.02	99.81	62	US 40 – Springfield	
Clark	South Vienna	66.33	106.75	66	SR 54 – Catawba, South Vienna	
Madison	Somerford Township	72.36	116.45	72	SR 56 – Mechanicsburg, London	
Madison	Deer Creek Township	79.10	127.30	79	US 42 – Plain City, London	
Madison	Jefferson Township	80.76	129.97	80	SR 29 – West Jefferson	
Madison	Jefferson Township	85.39	137.42	85	SR 142 (Plain City–Georgesville Road) – West Jefferson, Plain City	
Franklin	Columbus	91.30	146.93	91	Hilliard-Rome Road	Signed as exits 91A (south) and 91B (north) westbound
Franklin	Columbus	92.82– 92.94	149.38– 149.57	93	I-270 – Cincinnati, Cleveland	Signed as exits 93A (south) and 93B (north) eastbound; I-270 exit 8
Franklin	Columbus	93.98	151.25	94	Wilson Road	
Franklin	Columbus	94.97	152.84	95	Hague Avenue	Westbound exit and eastbound entrance
Franklin	Columbus	96.15	154.74	96	I-670 east – Airport	Eastbound exit and westbound entrance
Franklin	Columbus	97.25	156.51	97	US 40 (W. Broad Street)	
Franklin	Columbus	97.82– 98.02	157.43– 157.75	98A	US 62 (Central Avenue) / SR 3 / Sullivant Avenue	Westbound exit and eastbound entrance
Franklin	Columbus	98.27	158.15	98B	Mound Street	Westbound exit and eastbound entrance
Franklin	Columbus	98.86– 99.44	159.10– 160.03	99C	Rich Street / Town Street ( US 62 / SR 3)	Access via SR 315; westbound exit only; SR 315 exit 1A
Franklin	Columbus	98.86– 99.44	159.10– 160.03	99	I-71 south / SR 315 north – Cincinnati	Western end of I-71 concurrency; signed as exits 99A (south) and 99B (north); I-71 exit 106A
Franklin	Columbus	99.98	160.90	100	US 23 (Third Street / Fourth Street) / Fulton Street	Replaces exits 100A-B; has no westbound exit
Franklin	Columbus	99.99	160.92	100A	US 23 south (High Street) / Front Street	Closed after opening of new exit 100; was eastbound exit and westbound entrance
Franklin	Columbus	100.23– 100.33	161.30– 161.47	100B	US 23 north / US 33 (3rd & 4th Streets) / Livingston Avenue	Closed after opening of new exit 100; had no westbound exit
Franklin	Columbus	100.91– 101.28	162.40– 162.99	101B	Parsons Avenue	Eastbound exit only
Franklin	Columbus	100.91– 101.28	162.40– 162.99	101A	I-71 north to I-670 – Cleveland	Eastern end of I-71 concurrency; I-71 exit 107; access to John Glenn Columbus International Airport
Franklin	Columbus	100.91– 101.28	162.40– 162.99	101B	Downtown	Westbound exit and eastbound entrance; eastbound exit was signed for 18th Street, closed in 2020
Franklin	Columbus	102.10– 102.21	164.31– 164.49	102	Miller Avenue / Kelton Avenue	
Franklin	Columbus	103.04	165.83	103A	Main Street — Bexley	Eastbound exit and westbound entrance; indirect access via Alum Creek Drive
Franklin	Columbus	103.403– 103.513	166.411– 166.588	103B	US 33 (Livingston Avenue) / Alum Creek Drive	Alum Creek Drive signed eastbound only, US 33 signed westbound only
Franklin	Columbus	104.603– 105.613	168.342– 169.968	105	US 33 / James Road – Lancaster, Bexley	Signed as exits 105A (south) and 105B (north)
Franklin	Columbus	107.163– 107.633	172.462– 173.219	107	SR 317 (Hamilton Road) – Whitehall	Signed as exits 107A (south) and 107B (north) eastbound
Franklin	Columbus	108.393– 109.213	174.442– 175.761	108	I-270 – Cincinnati, Cleveland	Signed as exits 108A (south) and 108B (north) westbound; I-270 exits 43A-B.
Franklin	Columbus	109.823– 110.183	176.743– 177.322	110	Brice Road — Reynoldsburg	Signed as exits 110A (south) and 110B (north) eastbound
Fairfield	Pickerington	112.023– 112.403	180.284– 180.895	112	SR 256 – Pickerington, Reynoldsburg	Signed as exits 112A (south) and 112B (north) eastbound, exit 112 westbound
Fairfield	Violet Township	112.923	181.732	112C	SR 204 (Blacklick–Eastern Road)	Eastbound exit only
Licking	Etna Township	118.053– 118.373	189.988– 190.503	118	SR 310 – Etna, Pataskala	
Licking	Kirkersville	122.373– 122.753	196.940– 197.552	122	SR 158 – Kirkersville, Baltimore	
Licking	Union Township	125.893– 126.913	202.605– 204.247	126	SR 37 – Granville, Lancaster	
Licking	Union Township	128.683– 129.263	207.095– 208.029	129	SR 79 – Buckeye Lake, Newark	
Licking	Licking Township	132.643– 132.973	213.468– 213.999	132	SR 13 – Newark, Thornville	
Licking	Bowling Green Township	140.763– 140.903	226.536– 226.761	141	SR 668 – Brownsville, Gratiot	Eastbound exit and westbound entrance
Muskingum	Hopewell Township	142.883– 143.198	229.948– 230.455	142	To US 40 – Gratiot	Westbound exit and eastbound entrance
Muskingum	Falls Township	152.168– 152.820	244.891– 245.940	152	US 40 (National Road) – Zanesville	
Muskingum	Zanesville	153.359	246.807	153A	SR 60 north / SR 146 west (State Street)	Signed as exit 153 eastbound
Muskingum	Zanesville	154.203– 154.416	248.166– 248.508	153B	Maple Avenue	Westbound exit and eastbound entrance
Muskingum	Zanesville	154.528– 154.643	248.689– 248.874	154	Fifth Street	Eastbound exit only
Muskingum	Zanesville	154.661– 154.703	248.903– 248.970	155	SR 60 south (Seventh Street) / SR 146 east / SR 666 north	
Muskingum	Washington Township	156.921– 157.446	252.540– 253.385	157	SR 93 – Adamsville, Zanesville	
Muskingum	Perry Township	160.391– 160.977	258.124– 259.067	160	Airport Road / Sonora Road	Access to Zanesville Municipal Airport
Muskingum	Perry Township	163.905– 164.548	263.780– 264.814	164	US 22 / US 40 – Norwich	
Muskingum	New Concord	169.585– 170.135	272.921– 273.806	169	SR 83 – Cumberland, New Concord	
Guernsey	Cambridge Township	175.903– 176.377	283.088– 283.851	176	US 22 / US 40 (SR 723) – Cambridge	
Guernsey	Cambridge Township	178.390– 178.970	287.091– 288.024	178	SR 209 – Cambridge, Byesville	
Guernsey	Cambridge Township	179.654– 180.474	289.125– 290.445	180	I-77 – Marietta, Cleveland	Signed as exits 180A (south) and 180B (north); I-77 exits 44A-B
Guernsey	Wills Township	186.347– 187.020	299.896– 300.980	186	US 40 west / SR 285 – Old Washington, Senecaville	Western end of US 40 concurrency
Guernsey	Oxford Township	193.053– 193.713	310.689– 311.751	193	SR 513 – Quaker City	
Guernsey–Belmont county line	Fairview	198.385– 198.887	319.270– 320.078	198	CR 114 – Fairview	
Belmont	Kirkwood Township	202.357– 202.737	325.662– 326.274	202	SR 800 – Dennison, Barnesville	
Belmont	Kirkwood–Union township line	204.537– 204.747	329.170– 329.508	204	US 40 (National Road) / CR 100	Eastern end of US 40 concurrency; eastbound exit and westbound entrance
Belmont	Union Township	208.057– 208.427	334.835– 335.431	208	SR 149 – Belmont, Morristown	
Belmont	Richland Township	212.707– 212.897	342.319– 342.625	213	US 40 / SR 331	
Belmont	Richland Township	215.027– 215.457	346.052– 346.744	215	US 40 – St. Clairsville	
Belmont	Richland Township	216.667– 216.967	348.692– 349.175	216	SR 9 – St. Clairsville	
Belmont	Richland Township	218.367– 218.827	351.428– 352.168	218	Mall Road / Banfield Road	
Belmont	Richland Township	219.607– 219.957	353.423– 353.986	219	I-470 – Bellaire, Washington PA	Eastbound exit and westbound entrance
Belmont	Richland Township	219.937– 220.427	353.954– 354.743	220	US 40 (National Road) / CR 214	
Belmont	Bridgeport	225.117– 225.357	362.291– 362.677	225	To US 250 west / SR 7 – Bridgeport	
Ohio River		225.587	363.047	Ohio–West Virginia line		
Ohio River		225.587	363.047		I-70 east / US 250 south – Wheeling	Continuation into West Virginia
1.000 mi = 1.609 km; 1.000 km = 0.621 mi: Closed/former; Concurrency terminus; Incomplete access

== Auxiliary routes ==
Interstate	City	Type	Notes
Interstate 270	Columbus	Loop	
Interstate 470	Wheeling	Bypass	Route extends into West Virginia
Interstate 670	Columbus	Bypass	

== See also ==
- Interstate 70 Business (Springfield, Ohio)

Interstate 70
Previous state: Indiana	Ohio	Next state: West Virginia
