= Ohio State Route 188 =

State highway in central Ohio, US

State Route 188

Route information
- Maintained by ODOT
- Length: 39.04 mi (62.83 km)
- Existed: 1927–present

Major junctions
- West end: US 22 / SR 56 in Circleville
- US 33 near Lancaster; US 22 / SR 37 / SR 158 in Lancaster
- East end: SR 204 in Thornville

Location
- Country: United States
- State: Ohio
- Counties: Pickaway, Fairfield, Perry

Highway system
- Ohio State Highway System; Interstate; US; State; Scenic
← SR 187	→ SR 189

State Route 188 (SR 188) is a 39.04-mile-long (62.83 km) east–west state highway located in the central part of the U.S. state of Ohio. SR 188's western terminus is in Circleville at a signalized intersection where it meets the concurrency of U.S. Route 22 (US 22) and SR 56. Its eastern terminus is at a signalized intersection with SR 204 in the central business district of the village of Thornville.

== Route description ==
SR 188 traverses the eastern part of Pickaway County, then through the western, central and northeastern portions of Fairfield County and finally the northwestern corner of Perry County. No segment of SR 188 is included as a part of the National Highway System (NHS). The NHS is a network of routes deemed to be most important for the economy, mobility and defense of the nation.

== History ==
SR 188 was designated in 1927. When it was first designated, it was routed along its present alignment between Circleville and Lancaster, following what had been previously designated as a portion of SR 158. In 1937, SR 188 was extended to the northeast from Lancaster along what was at the time an un-numbered roadway to its current eastern terminus at SR 204 in Thornville.

== Major intersections ==
County	Location	mi	km	Destinations	Notes
Pickaway	Circleville	0.00	0.00	US 22 / SR 56 (Main Street) / South Court Street	
Pickaway–Fairfield county line	Walnut–Amanda township line	8.03	12.92	SR 674 (Winchester Southern Road) – Stoutsville, Canal Winchester	
Fairfield	Hocking Township	17.41	28.02	US 33 – Logan, Columbus	Interchange
Fairfield	Lancaster	20.88	33.60	US 22 west (Lincoln Avenue)	Western end of US 22 concurrency
Fairfield	Lancaster	21.38	34.41	SR 158 north (Columbus Avenue)	Western end of SR 158 concurrency
Fairfield	Lancaster	21.67	34.87	SR 37 west (High Street) / SR 158 ends	Eastern end of SR 158 concurrency; western end of SR 37 concurrency
Fairfield	Lancaster	22.51	36.23	US 22 east / SR 37 east (East Main Street) / South Cherry Street	Eastern end of US 22 / SR 37
Fairfield	Walnut Township	32.56	52.40	SR 256 – Thurston	
Perry	Thornville	39.04	62.83	SR 204 (Columbus Street) to SR 13 / North Main Street	
1.000 mi = 1.609 km; 1.000 km = 0.621 mi: Concurrency terminus
