= Ohio State Route 158 =

North-south state highway in central Ohio, US

State Route 158

Route information
- Maintained by ODOT
- Length: 18.11 mi (29.15 km)
- Existed: 1923–present

Major junctions
- South end: US 22 / SR 37 / SR 188 in Lancaster
- I-70 near Kirkersville
- North end: US 40 in Kirkersville

Location
- Country: United States
- State: Ohio
- Counties: Fairfield, Licking

Highway system
- Ohio State Highway System; Interstate; US; State; Scenic
← SR 157	→ SR 159

State Route 158 (SR 158) is a two-lane north–south state highway located in the central portion of the U.S. state of Ohio. No section of State Route 158 is included as a portion of the National Highway System.

== History ==
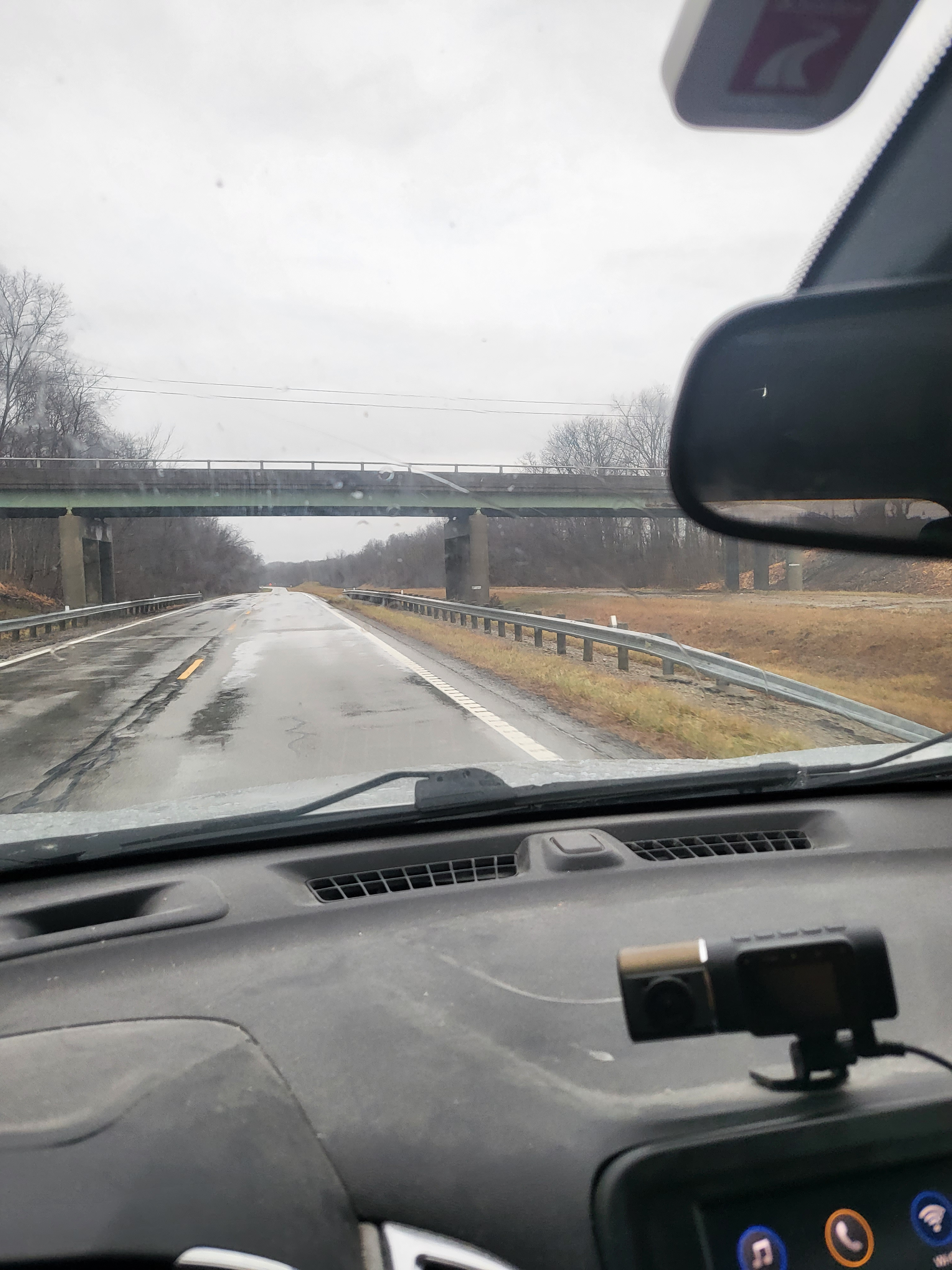
The northern end of OH 158 that once served as a connecting road between I-70 and US 40. Note the westbound grading and Interstate-style bridge.

State Route 158 was established in 1923. Its original routing utilized the majority of its current routing between Lancaster and Kirkersville. The only exception is that in Kirkersville, State Route 158 continued due north along what is now County Road 40 up to U.S. Route 40.

== Route description ==
State Route 158's southern terminus is in downtown Lancaster at its junction with U.S. Route 22, State Route 37 and State Route 188. Its northern terminus is at a T-intersection US 40 in Kirkersville.

The route intersects Interstate 70 in Kirkersville, and actually follows an old alignment of Interstate 70 bypassing the town. That segment was abandoned when the Interstate was extended towards Columbus in the late 1960s.

With the completion of Interstate 70 from Kirkersville eastward in 1959, State Route 158's northern terminus was relocated to its junction with Interstate 70. Meanwhile, for the time being, Interstate 70 followed what is now the northernmost stretch of State Route 158 to hook in with U.S. Route 40 in the western end of Kirkersville, as it would be a number of years before the Interstate would be completed along its present alignment west of State Route 158. Jurisdiction of the former stretch of the state highway north of Interstate 70 was turned over to Licking County, which renamed the roadway as County Road 40. Then, in 1969, Interstate 70 was completed along its present alignment heading west from State Route 158, and the former alignment of Interstate 70 that hooked in with U.S. Route 40 was abandoned as a freeway. Consequently, State Route 158 was restored to the north of Interstate 70, with it being the new designation for the former path of Interstate 70. This, in turn, brought the highway to its current northern terminus at U.S. Route 40 in the western end of Kirkersville.

== Major intersections ==
County	Location	mi	km	Destinations	Notes
Fairfield	Lancaster	0.00	0.00	US 22 east / SR 188 east (East Main Street) / SR 37 (High Street)	Southern end of US 22 / SR 188 concurrency
Fairfield	Lancaster	0.29	0.47	US 22 west / SR 188 west (West Main Street) / South Columbus Street	Northern end of US 22 / SR 188 concurrency
Fairfield	Baltimore	9.81	15.79	SR 256 (Market Street)	
Fairfield	Liberty Township	13.80	22.21	SR 204 – Pickerington, Millersport	
Licking	Harrison Township	16.80	27.04	I-70 – Columbus, Wheeling	Exit 122 (I-70)
Licking	Kirkersville	18.11	29.15	US 40 (National Road) – Columbus, Zanesville	
1.000 mi = 1.609 km; 1.000 km = 0.621 mi: Concurrency terminus
