= Ohio State Route 70 =

State Route 70

Route information
- Maintained by ODOT

Location
- Country: United States
- State: Ohio

Highway system
- Ohio State Highway System; Interstate; US; State; Scenic
← I-70	→ I-71

In Ohio, State Route 70 may refer to:

- Interstate 70 in Ohio, the only Ohio highway numbered 70 since about 1962
- Ohio State Route 70 (1923), now SR 753 (near Sinking Spring to Greenfield) and SR 41 (Greenfield to Covington)
