= Ohio State Route 757 =

State highway in Perry County, Ohio, US

State Route 757

Route information
- Maintained by ODOT
- Length: 5.68 mi (9.14 km)
- Existed: 1938–present

Major junctions
- South end: SR 13 in Somerset
- North end: SR 204 in Glenford

Location
- Country: United States
- State: Ohio
- Counties: Perry

Highway system
- Ohio State Highway System; Interstate; US; State; Scenic
← SR 756	→ SR 761

State Route 757 (SR 757) is a north–south state highway located in the central portion of the U.S. state of Ohio. The highway runs from its southern terminus at SR 13 in Somerset to its northern terminus at a T-intersection with SR 204 in Glenford.

== Route description ==
SR 757 runs exclusively within northern Perry County. The highway is not included as a portion of the National Highway System.

== History ==
This state route came into existence in 1937, starting from SR 13 approximately 1.25 miles (2.01 km) northwest of Somerset, and utilizing Black Horse Road (County Road 27) up to where it meets the current SR 757, then following the current alignment of the highway from that point to its current northern terminus at SR 204 in Glenford. By 1957, the southern portion of SR 757 was re-aligned onto the routing that it follows today from the Black Horse Road intersection southeasterly to its intersection with SR 13 in Somerset.

== Major intersections ==
The entire route is in Perry County.

Location	mi	km	Destinations	Notes
Somerset	0.00	0.00	SR 13 (North Columbus Street) to US 22 / North Drive – Newark	
Hopewell Township	5.68	9.14	SR 204 (High Street) to SR 668 – Thornville	
1.000 mi = 1.609 km; 1.000 km = 0.621 mi
