= Ohio State Route 13 =

North-south state highway in Ohio, US

State Route 13
- Route of SR 13 highlighted in red

Route information
- Maintained by ODOT
- Length: 166.15 mi (267.39 km)
- Existed: 1926–present

Major junctions
- South end: SR 550 near Athens
- US 22 / SR 668 in Somerset; I-70 near Thornville; US 40 near Thornville; US 62 in Utica; US 36 / SR 229 in Mt. Vernon; I-71 in Mansfield; US 42 in Mansfield; US 30 in Mansfield; US 250 / SR 162 / CR 60 in Fitchville; US 20 / SR 18 in Norwalk; SR 2 near Huron
- North end: US 6 in Huron

Location
- Country: United States
- State: Ohio
- Counties: Athens, Perry, Licking, Knox, Richland, Huron, Erie

Highway system
- Ohio State Highway System; Interstate; US; State; Scenic
← SR 12	→ SR 14
← US 30	→ US 30S

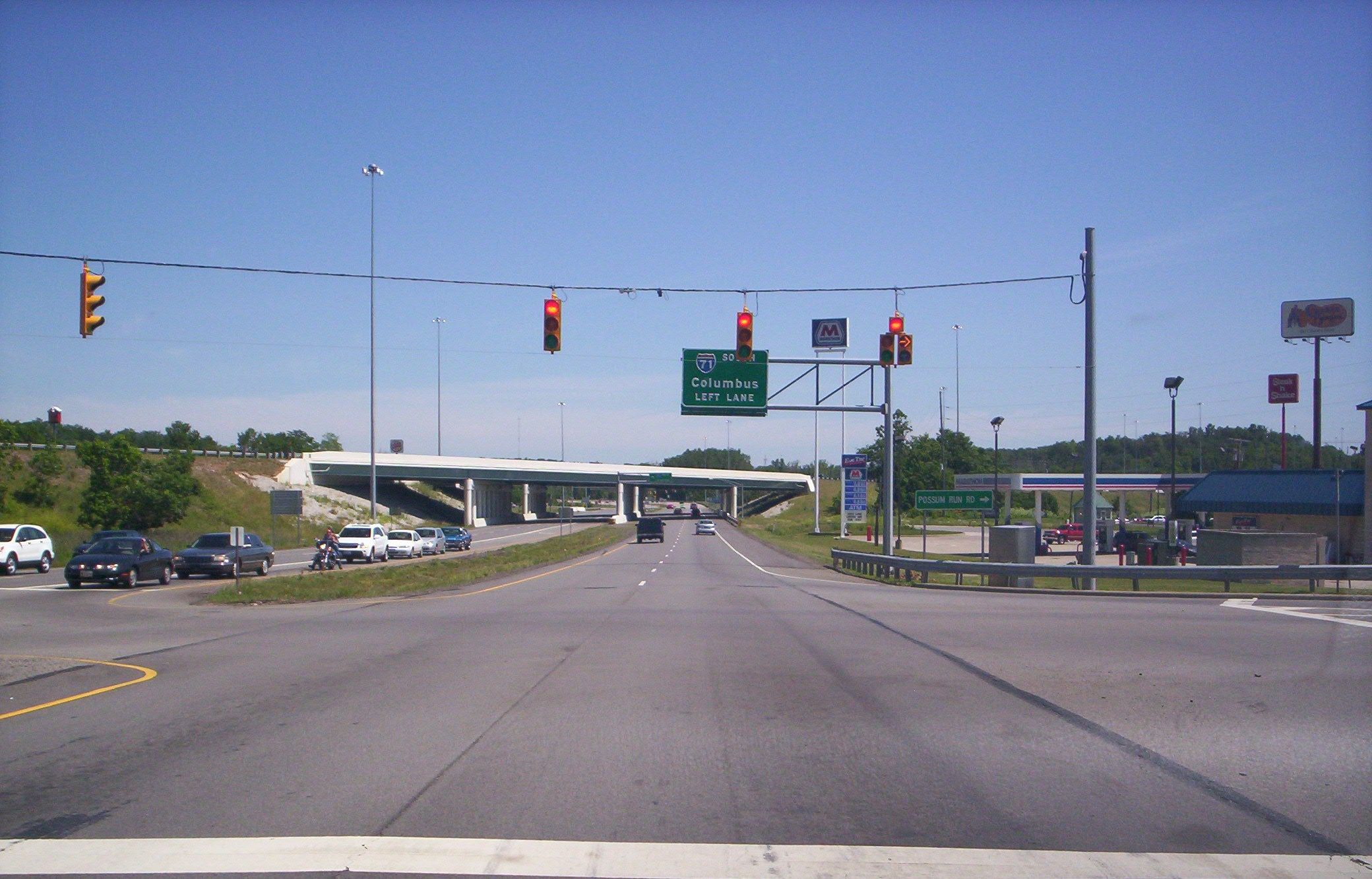
State Route 13 at the Possum Run Road intersection heading northbound near the junction of I-71 in Mansfield.

State Route 13 is a north–south state highway in the northern and southeastern portions of the U.S. state of Ohio. It is the tenth longest state route in Ohio. Its southern terminus is at State Route 550 near Athens, and its northern terminus is at U.S. Route 6 in Huron.

== Route description ==
Route 13 arises in Dover Township, Athens County, Ohio at Ohio State Route 550 at its junction with US Route 33. It travels west to the heart of Chauncey, Ohio, then turns north at its junction with Ohio State Route 682. After leaving Chauncey, it bypasses Millfield, Ohio, then enters Trimble Township and passes through Redtown, Jacksonville, Trimble, Glouster, Palos, then passes by the dam side of Burr Oak State Park and passes Burr Oak. It then enters Perry County and continues north. For much of its length in Athens and Perry Counties, the highway is paralleled by a line of the Norfolk Southern Railway.

== History ==
The southern terminus of Ohio State Route 13 was originally in the village of Chauncey, Ohio, at the intersection with Ohio State Route 682 that is now at mile 3.15. This original terminus was at what was then US-33. Since then, US-33 was rebuilt as a four-lane divided highway, and is across the Hocking River now from Chauncey. The former section of US-33 was divided between Ohio State Route 682, to the west, and Ohio State Route 13, to the east, slightly extending both roadways.

North of Chauncey, the highway now is almost straight as it passes Millfield, Ohio and goes to Redtown, Ohio, and passes through a cut through a ridge. Originally, the highway looped through Millfield and Truetown.

On the northern end Ohio State Route 13 followed US 250 into Sandusky until 1966, at which point 13 was rerouted onto Ohio State Route 299. With this move State Route 299 was deleted.

== Major intersections ==
County	Location	mi	km	Destinations	Notes
Athens	Athens Township	0.00	0.00	SR 550 to US 33 – Athens, Amesville	
Athens	Chauncey	3.15	5.07	SR 682 south (Main Street) to US 33	Northern terminus of SR 682
Athens	Trimble Township	8.39	13.50	SR 685 west – Buchtel	Eastern terminus of SR 685
Athens	Trimble	10.71	17.24	SR 329 south (Congress Street) – Amesville	Northern terminus of SR 329
Athens	Glouster	11.86	19.09	SR 78 west (Toledo Street) – Murray City	Southern end of SR 78 concurrency
Athens	Trimble Township–Glouster municipal line	12.88	20.73	SR 78 east – McConnelsville	Northern end of SR 78 concurrency
Perry	Corning	20.30	32.67	SR 155 west (Main Street) – Shawnee	Eastern terminus of SR 155
Perry	Bearfield Township	29.65	47.72	SR 37 east / SR 93 north – McConnelsville, Crooksville	Southern end of SR 37 / SR 93 concurrencies
Perry	New Lexington	34.97	56.28	SR 93 south (Main Street)	Northern end of SR 93 concurrency
Perry	New Lexington	35.63	57.34	SR 345 north (West Broadway Street) / Monument Street	Southern terminus of SR 345
Perry	New Lexington	36.08	58.07	SR 37 west (West Broadway Street) – Hocking College Perry Campus	Northern end of SR 37 concurrency
Perry	Reading Township	42.26	68.01	SR 669 east – Crooksville, Perry State Forest	Western terminus of SR 669
Perry	Reading Township	42.90	69.04	SR 383 south – St. Joseph's Catholic Church	Northern terminus of SR 383
Perry	Somerset	44.04	70.88	US 22 / SR 668 (Main Street)	Traffic circle with monument to Gen. Philip Sheridan
Perry	Somerset	44.42	71.49	SR 757 north / North Drive – Glenford	Southern terminus of SR 757
Perry	Thorn Township	49.90	80.31	SR 256 west – Thurston	Eastern terminus of SR 256
Perry	Thorn Township	54.55	87.79	SR 204 – Thornville, Glenford	
Licking	Licking Township	57.61– 57.81	92.71– 93.04	I-70 – Columbus, Wheeling	Exit 132 (I-70)
Licking	Licking Township	58.83	94.68	US 40 (National Road) – Hebron, Zanesville	
Licking	Newark	66.14	106.44	SR 16 / SR 79 – Coshocton, Columbus	Interchange; SR 16 east / SR 79 north via Mt. Vernon Road only
Licking	Newton Township	70.22	113.01	SR 657 north to US 36	Southern terminus of SR 657
Licking	Utica	78.73	126.70	US 62 – Johnstown, Martinsburg	
Knox	Mount Vernon	88.06	141.72	SR 661 south (Blackjack Street) – Granville	Northern terminus of SR 661
Knox	Mount Vernon	89.62	144.23	SR 586 south (Martinsville Road)	Northern terminus of SR 586
Knox	Mount Vernon	90.31	145.34	SR 229 (East Gambier Street)	Southern end of SR 229 concurrency (SR 13 north / SR 229 west only)
Knox	Mount Vernon	90.43	145.53	US 36 (East High Street) / SR 229 west	Northern end of SR 229 concurrency
Knox	Mount Vernon	90.57	145.76	SR 3 (North Main Street)	
Knox	Fredericktown	97.75	157.31	SR 95 (Mt. Gilead Road) – Fredericktown, Mount Gilead	Interchange
Knox	Middlebury Township	100.97	162.50	SR 546 north (Lexington Road) – Lexington	Southern terminus of SR 546
Richland	Bellville	107.91	173.66	SR 97 west (Church Street)	Southern end of SR 97 concurrency
Richland	Bellville	108.30	174.29	SR 97 east (Mill Street)	Northern end of SR 97 concurrency
Richland	Washington Township–Mansfield municipal line	113.45– 114.05	182.58– 183.55	I-71 – Cleveland, Columbus	Exit 169 (I-71)
Richland	Mansfield	116.32	187.20	Cook Road	Northbound exit / southbound entrance only
Richland	Mansfield	117.03	188.34	Main Street	Northbound entrance / southbound exit only
Richland	Mansfield	118.04	189.97	US 42 south (Lexington Avenue)	Southern end of US 42 concurrency; no access to US 42 southbound from SR 13 northbound
Richland	Mansfield	118.36	190.48	US 42 east (East First Street) / South Diamond Street	Northern end of US 42 concurrency
Richland	Mansfield	118.44	190.61	US 42 south (East Second Street)	
Richland	Mansfield	118.53	190.76	SR 430 (Park Avenue)	
Richland	Mansfield	118.83	191.24	SR 39 (East Fifth Street)	
Richland	Mansfield	119.83– 120.01	192.85– 193.14	US 30 / Longview Avenue – Wooster, Bucyrus	Exit 130 (US 30); eastbound US 30 via Longview Avenue
Richland	Franklin Township	127.85	205.75	SR 96 west – Shelby	Southern end of SR 96 concurrency
Richland	Franklin Township	128.58	206.93	SR 96 east – Ashland	Northern end of SR 96 concurrency
Richland	Blooming Grove Township	129.84	208.96	SR 603 – Shiloh, Olivesburg	
Huron	Greenwich Township	138.05	222.17	US 224 – Napoleon, Akron	
Huron	Fitchville Township	142.56	229.43	US 250 east / SR 162 east / CR 60 (Fitchville River Road) – New London, Ashland	Southern end of US 250 / SR 162 concurrencies
Huron	Fitchville Township	143.20	230.46	SR 162 west – North Fairfield	Northern end of SR 162 concurrency
Huron	Norwalk	153.02– 153.21	246.26– 246.57	US 20 / SR 18 (Norwalk Bypass) – Cleveland, Toledo	Interchange
Huron	Norwalk	154.73	249.01	SR 61 (Main Street)	
Erie	Milan	158.78	255.53	SR 113 east (Church Street) / Shawmill Road – North Ridgeville	Southern end of SR 113 concurrency
Erie	Milan Township	159.36	256.47	SR 113 west – Bellevue	Northern end of SR 113 concurrency
Erie	Milan Township	159.90	257.33	US 250 west to Ohio Turnpike – Sandusky	Northern end of US 250 concurrency
Erie	Huron Township	164.54– 164.68	264.80– 265.03	SR 2 – Cleveland, Toledo	Exit 145 (SR 2)
Erie	Huron	166.15	267.39	US 6 / LECT (Cleveland Road)	
1.000 mi = 1.609 km; 1.000 km = 0.621 mi: Concurrency terminus; Incomplete access
