= Ohio State Route 256 =

State highway in central Ohio, US

State Route 256

Route information
- Maintained by ODOT
- Length: 25.99 mi (41.83 km)

Major junctions
- West end: US 40 in Reynoldsburg
- I-70 in Pickerington
- East end: SR 13 west of Somerset

Location
- Country: United States
- State: Ohio
- Counties: Franklin, Fairfield, Perry

Highway system
- Ohio State Highway System; Interstate; US; State; Scenic
← SR 255	→ SR 257

State Route 256 (SR 256) is a 25.99-mile (41.83 km) east–west state highway in the central portion of the U.S. state of Ohio. The western terminus of SR 256 is at a T-intersection with U.S. Route 40 (US 40) in Reynoldsburg. Its eastern terminus is at a T-intersection with SR 13 approximately 5.50 miles (8.85 km) west-northwest of Somerset.

== Route description ==
SR 256 runs through parts of Franklin, Fairfield and Perry Counties. No portion of SR 256 is included within the National Highway System (NHS). The NHS is a system of highways deemed most important for the nation's economy, mobility and defense.

== History ==
The current route of SR 256 between Reynoldsburg and Baltimore was commissioned as SR 204, in 1923. In 1927, SR 256 was commissioned on that section of SR 204. SR 256 was extended east to an intersection with SR 13, in 1937.

== Major intersections ==
County	Location	mi	km	Destinations	Notes
Franklin	Reynoldsburg	0.00	0.00	US 40 (Main Street)	Eastbound US 40 to SR 256 / SR 256 to eastbound US 40 only
Fairfield	Pickerington	1.66	2.67	I-70 – Columbus, Wheeling, WV	Exit 112 (I-70)
Fairfield	Pickerington	1.97	3.17	SR 204 east (Blacklick-Eastern Road) / Tussing Road	Western terminus of SR 204
Fairfield	Baltimore	14.74	23.72	SR 158 (Main Street)	
Fairfield	Walnut Township	16.56	26.65	SR 37 – Granville, Lancaster	
Fairfield	Walnut Township	20.06	32.28	SR 188 (Lancaster-Thornville Road)	
Fairfield–Perry county line	Richland–Thorn township line	24.33	39.16	SR 664 south – Rushville, Bremen	Northern terminus of SR 664
Perry	Thorn Township	25.99	41.83	SR 13 – Somerset, Newark	
1.000 mi = 1.609 km; 1.000 km = 0.621 mi: Incomplete access
