= Brownsville, Ohio =

- Census-designated place
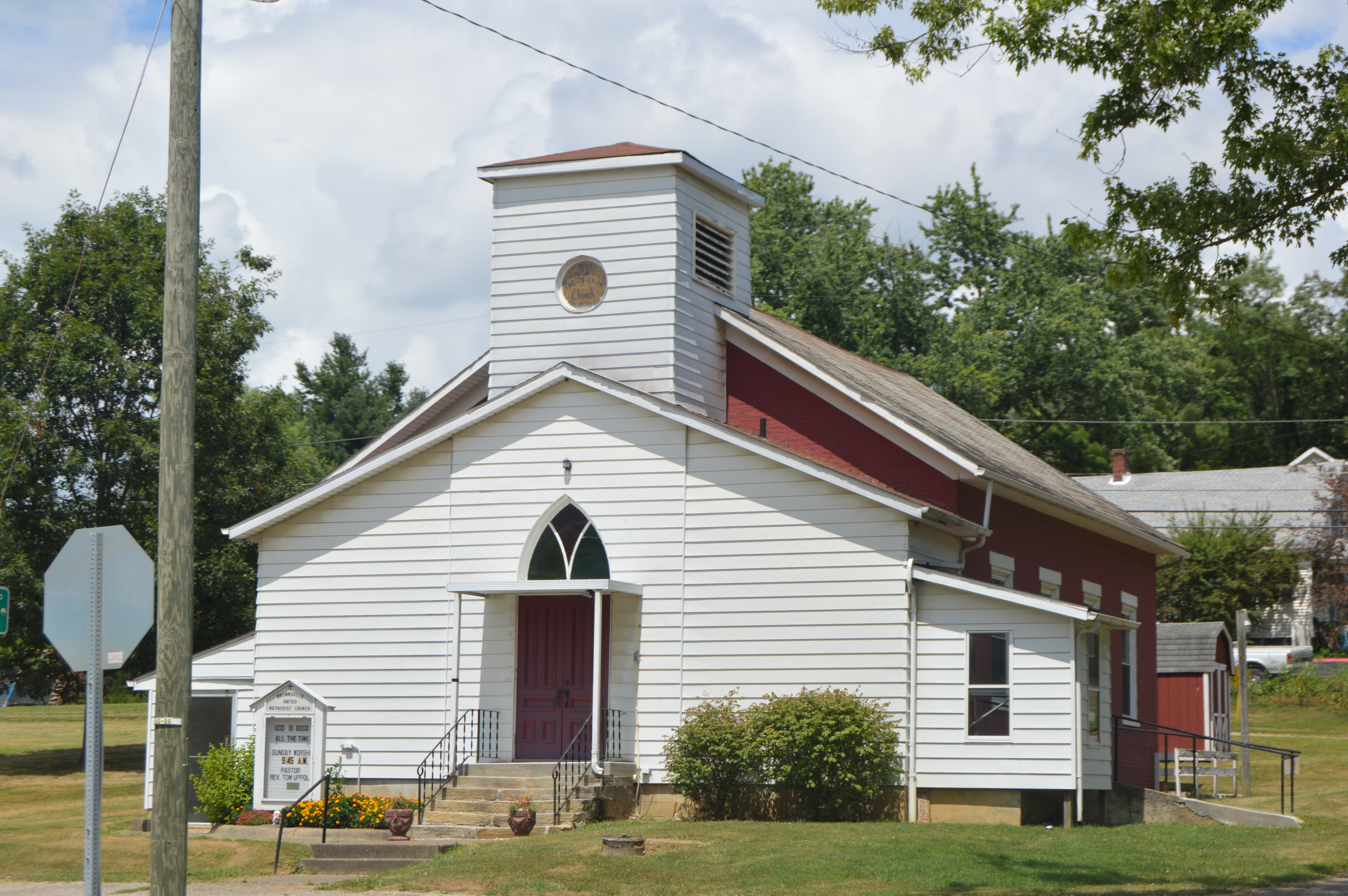
- Brownsville United Methodist Church

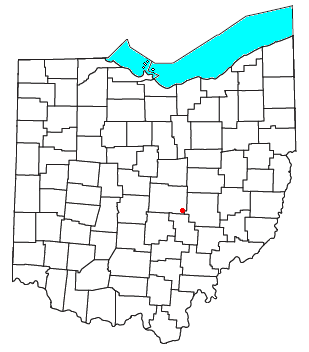
- Location of Brownsville in Ohio
- Coordinates: 39°56′36″N 82°15′00″W
- Country: United States
- State: Ohio
- County: Licking
- Township: Bowling Green

Area
  - Total: 0.89 sq mi (2.31 km^{2})
  - Land: 0.89 sq mi (2.31 km^{2})
  - Water: 0 sq mi (0.00 km^{2})
- Elevation: 1,053 ft (321 m)

Population (2020)
  - Total: 214
  - Density: 240.3/sq mi (92.77/km^{2})
- Time zone: UTC-5 (Eastern (EST))
  - Summer (DST): UTC-4 (EDT)
- ZIP Code: 43721
- FIPS code: 39-09596
- GNIS feature ID: 2628868

Brownsville is an unincorporated community and census-designated place (CDP) in northeastern Bowling Green Township, Licking County, Ohio, United States. As of the 2020 census, it had a population of 214. It lies at the intersection of U.S. Route 40 with State Route 668.

== History ==
Brownsville starts when the National Road was extended to that point. The community was laid out in 1829. Brownsville was named for its founder, Adam Brown. A post office was established in 1830.

== Geography ==
Brownsville is in southeastern Licking County, 13 miles (21 km) southeast of Newark, the county seat. The community's northern border is the boundary between Bowling Green Township and Hopewell Township, and the southern border follows Interstate 70. Access to I-70 is provided by Exit 141, a half-interchange directly south of the town on State Route 668, for traffic traveling to and from the west. A complementary interchange for traffic to and from the east is Exit 142 in Gratiot, 2 miles (3 km) east of Brownsville. Both I-70 and US-40 lead east 13 miles (21 km) to Zanesville and west 41 miles (66 km) to Columbus.

According to the U.S. Census Bureau, the Brownsville CDP has a total area of 0.9 square miles (2.3 km^{2}), of which 0.6 acres (2,422 m^{2}), or 0.10%, are water. Brownsville is in the valley of Berry Run, a south-flowing tributary of Valley Run, which via Jonathan Creek is part of the Muskingum River watershed flowing south to the Ohio River.

Flint Ridge State Memorial is 3 miles (5 km) north of Brownsville.

== Demographics ==
Historical population
Census	Pop.	Note	%±
2020	214		—
U.S. Decennial Census

== Notable person ==
- William M. Morgan, congressman
