= Deavertown, Ohio =

Unincorporated community in Ohio, U.S.

Coordinates: 39°44′03″N 82°02′17″W

Deavertown is an unincorporated community in Morgan County, in the U.S. state of Ohio.

== History ==
Deavertown was laid out in 1815, and named for Levi Deaver, one of the original two brothers that settled the town. In 1840, Levi's daughter Matilda (d. 1858) married the future doctor, Daniel Rusk. A post office called Deavertown was established in 1828, and remained in operation until 1957.
