= Flint Ridge State Memorial =

Archaeological site in Ohio, United States

- Flint Ridge Ancient Quarries and Nature Preserve
- U.S. National Register of Historic Places
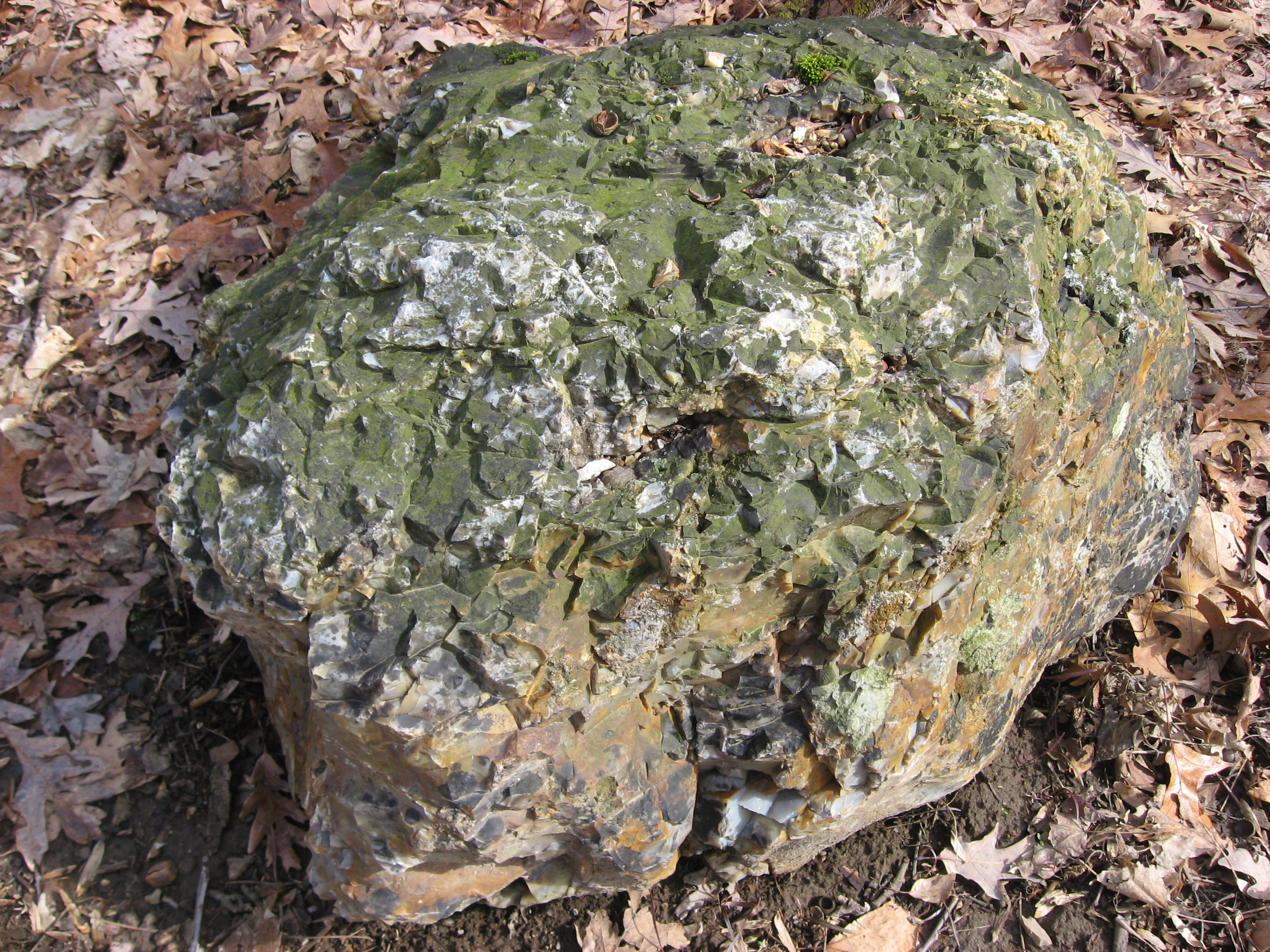
- A typical boulder at the site

- Location within Ohio Location within the United States
- Nearest city: Brownsville, Ohio
- Coordinates: 39.990322°N 82.260004°W
- Area: 250 acres (100 ha)
- NRHP reference No.: 70000505
- Added to NRHP: November 10, 1970

Quarrying landscape at Flint Ridge State Memorial, Ohio. Hopewell culture peoples excavated Vanport chert from shallow pits across this ridgeline for over 10,000 years.

Flint Ridge Ancient Quarries and Nature Preserve is a Native American flint quarry located in Hopewell Township, Licking County, Ohio, about 3 miles (5 km) north of Brownsville at the intersection of Brownsville Road and Flint Ridge Road. Old quarry pits are visible, and a museum owned and operated by the Ohio History Connection is located on the site.

Flint is a variety of quartz and the flint on the ridge is within the Vanport Limestone Member of the Allegheny Formation of Pennsylvanian age.

Vanport chert exposed in a creek bed at Flint Ridge State Memorial, Ohio — the distinctive multicolored flint quarried here for over 10,000 years and traded across the Hopewell exchange network.

Flint Ridge was an important source of flint and Native Americans extracted the flint from hundreds of quarries along the ridge. This "Ohio Flint" was traded across eastern North America and has been found as far west as present-day Kansas City and south around the Gulf of Mexico. Flint from the Knife River area in modern North Dakota has been found in archaeological sites associated with the Hopewell Culture in Ohio. (Note: Unique petrological characteristics of individual flint deposits permit stones' association with sources.) Ohio flint is the state gemstone of Ohio.

== See also ==
- Paleo Crossing site
