= Mount Perry, Ohio =

Unincorporated community in Ohio, United States

Coordinates: 39°52′43″N 82°13′12″W

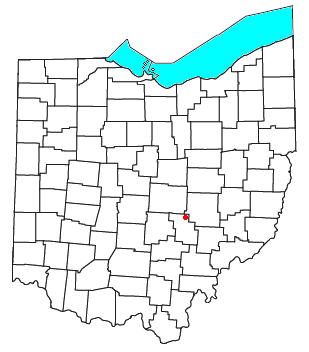
Location of Mount Perry, Ohio

Mount Perry is an unincorporated community in northern Madison Township, Perry County, Ohio, United States, northeast of Somerset. State Route 204 runs through the town. It is in the Northern Local School District, home of the Sheridan Generals.

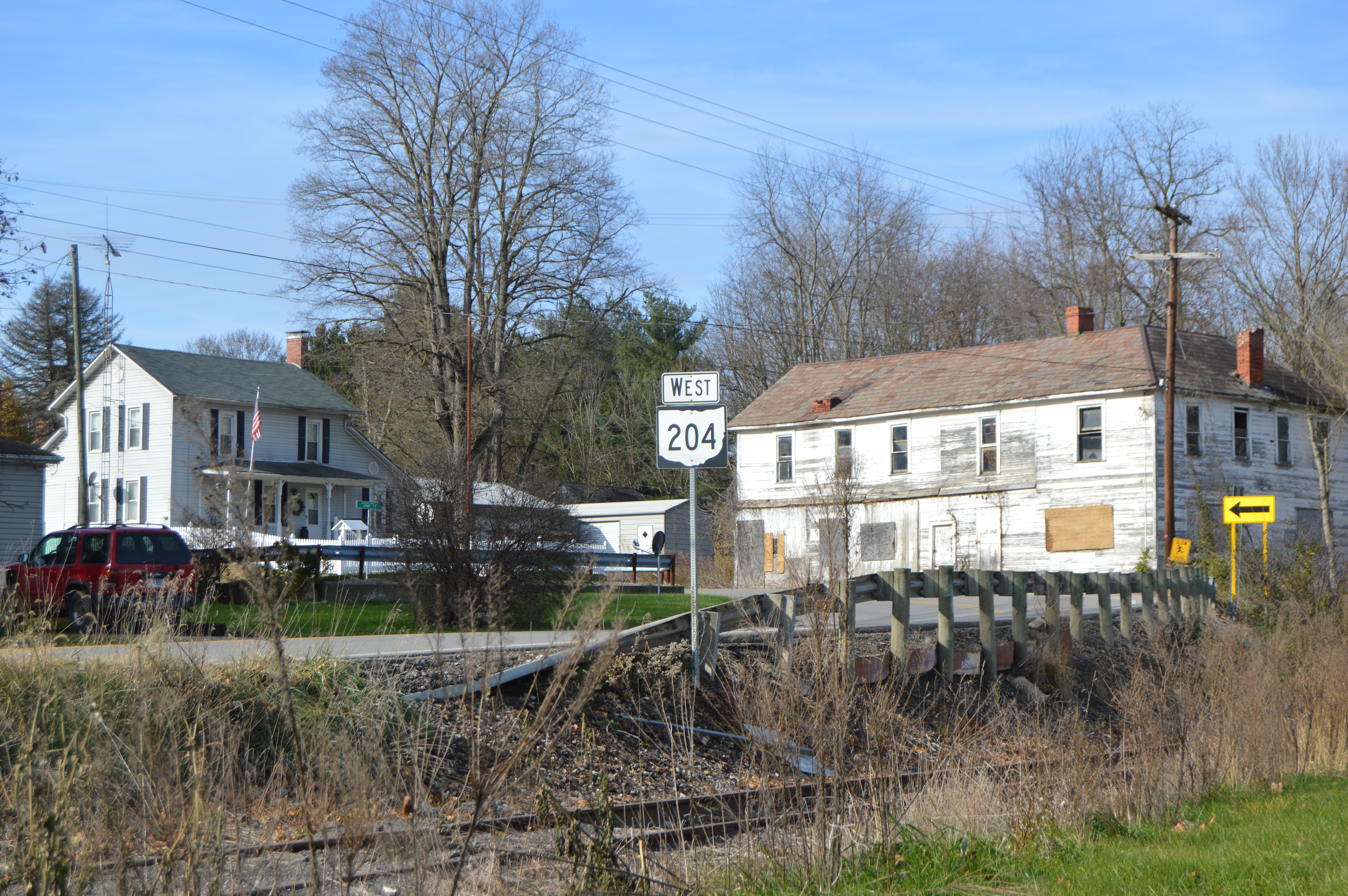
Scene on State Route 204

Mount Perry was laid out in 1828. A post office called Mount Perry has been in operation since 1843.
