= Junction City, Ohio =

- Village
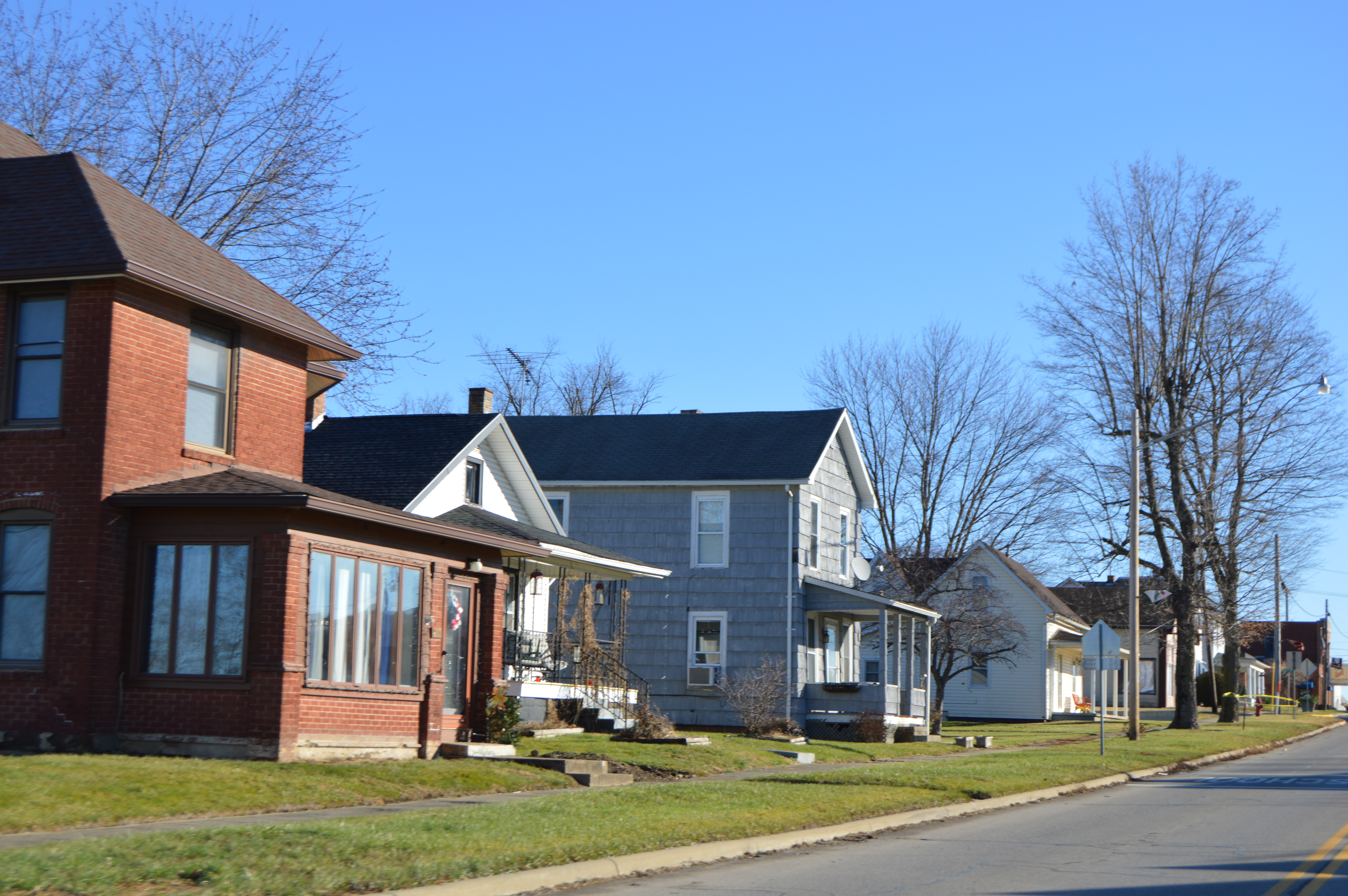
- Main Street

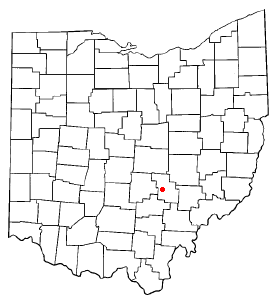
- Location of Junction City, Ohio

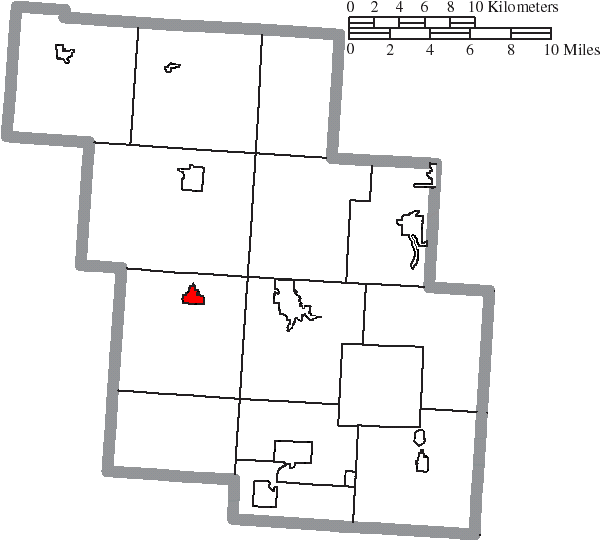
- Location of Junction City in Perry County
- Coordinates: 39°43′18″N 82°17′59″W
- Country: United States
- State: Ohio
- County: Perry

Area
  - Total: 0.65 sq mi (1.68 km^{2})
  - Land: 0.64 sq mi (1.67 km^{2})
  - Water: 0.0039 sq mi (0.01 km^{2})
- Elevation: 846 ft (258 m)

Population (2020)
  - Total: 721
  - Density: 1,120.7/sq mi (432.69/km^{2})
- Time zone: UTC-5 (Eastern (EST))
  - Summer (DST): UTC-4 (EDT)
- ZIP code: 43748
- Area code: 740
- FIPS code: 39-39508
- GNIS feature ID: 2398315

Junction City is a village in Perry County, Ohio, United States. The population was 721 at the 2020 census.

== History ==
Junction City was laid out in 1872 at the site of a railroad junction. A post office has been in operation at Junction City since 1872.

== Geography ==
According to the United States Census Bureau, the village has a total area of 0.64 square miles (1.66 km^{2}), of which 0.63 square miles (1.63 km^{2}) is land and 0.01 square miles (0.03 km^{2}) is water.

== Demographics ==
Historical population
Census	Pop.	Note	%±
1890	394		—
1900	443		12.4%
1910	811		83.1%
1920	890		9.7%
1930	860		−3.4%
1940	813		−5.5%
1950	805		−1.0%
1960	763		−5.2%
1970	732		−4.1%
1980	754		3.0%
1990	770		2.1%
2000	818		6.2%
2010	819		0.1%
2020	721		−12.0%
U.S. Decennial Census

=== 2010 census ===
As of the census of 2010, there were 819 people, 315 households, and 223 families living in the village. The population density was 1,300.0 inhabitants per square mile (501.9/km^{2}). There were 337 housing units at an average density of 534.9 per square mile (206.5/km^{2}). The racial makeup of the village was 97.3% White, 0.2% African American, 0.1% Native American, 0.1% Asian, 0.4% from other races, and 1.8% from two or more races. Hispanic or Latino of any race were 1.0% of the population.

There were 315 households, of which 34.9% had children under the age of 18 living with them, 41.9% were married couples living together, 17.1% had a female householder with no husband present, 11.7% had a male householder with no wife present, and 29.2% were non-families. 22.9% of all households were made up of individuals, and 8.2% had someone living alone who was 65 years of age or older. The average household size was 2.60 and the average family size was 3.00.

The median age in the village was 35.5 years. 26.6% of residents were under the age of 18; 10.6% were between the ages of 18 and 24; 26.3% were from 25 to 44; 25.3% were from 45 to 64; and 11.4% were 65 years of age or older. The gender makeup of the village was 50.4% male and 49.6% female.

=== 2000 census ===
As of the census of 2000, there were 818 people, 295 households, and 225 families living in the village. The population density was 1,276.4 inhabitants per square mile (492.8/km^{2}). There were 320 housing units at an average density of 499.3 per square mile (192.8/km^{2}). The racial makeup of the village was 99.14% White, and 0.86% from two or more races. Hispanic or Latino of any race were 0.61% of the population.

There were 295 households, out of which 40.3% had children under the age of 18 living with them, 54.2% were married couples living together, 15.6% had a female householder with no husband present, and 23.4% were non-families. 17.6% of all households were made up of individuals, and 7.5% had someone living alone who was 65 years of age or older. The average household size was 2.77 and the average family size was 3.12.

In the village, the population was spread out, with 29.8% under the age of 18, 8.4% from 18 to 24, 26.9% from 25 to 44, 24.8% from 45 to 64, and 10.0% who were 65 years of age or older. The median age was 32 years. For every 100 females, there were 98.1 males. For every 100 females age 18 and over, there were 94.6 males.

The median income for a household in the village was $29,861, and the median income for a family was $32,426. Males had a median income of $30,329 versus $18,750 for females. The per capita income for the village was $12,074. About 18.2% of families and 22.8% of the population were below the poverty line, including 27.0% of those under age 18 and 26.4% of those age 65 or over.

== Education ==
New Lexington Schools operates Junction City Elementary School in the village.

Junction City has a public library, a branch of the Perry County District Library.
