= Bowling Green Township, Licking County, Ohio =

Township in Ohio, US

- Township
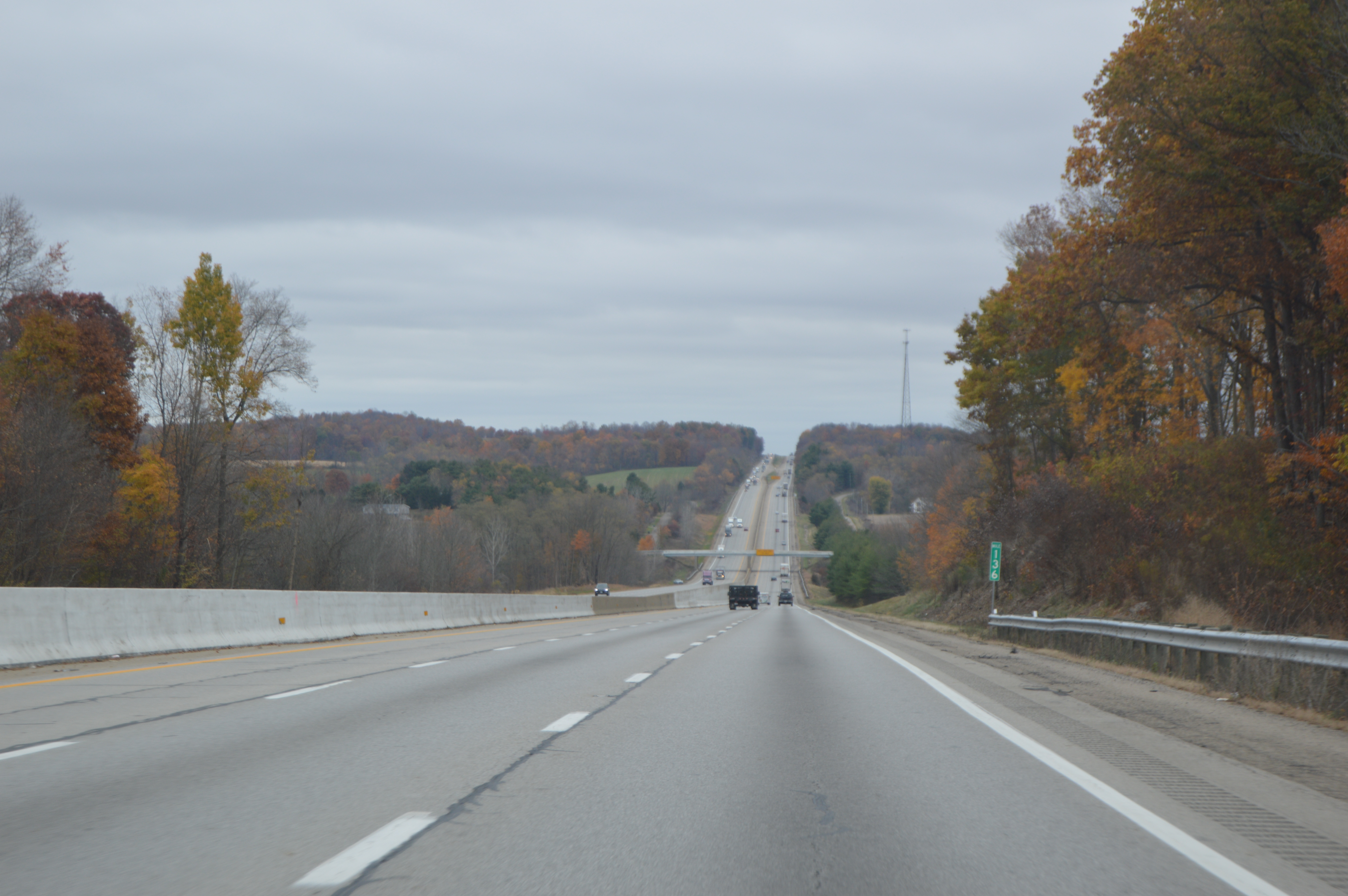
- Interstate 70 southwest of Brownsville

- Flag

- Location of Bowling Green Township in Licking County
- Coordinates: 39°56′4″N 82°17′46″W
- Country: United States
- State: Ohio
- County: Licking

Area
  - Total: 21.19 sq mi (54.88 km^{2})
  - Land: 21.13 sq mi (54.73 km^{2})
  - Water: 0.058 sq mi (0.15 km^{2})
- Elevation: 971 ft (296 m)

Population (2020)
  - Total: 1,799
  - Density: 85.13/sq mi (32.87/km^{2})
- Time zone: UTC-5 (Eastern (EST))
  - Summer (DST): UTC-4 (EDT)
- FIPS code: 39-07944
- GNIS feature ID: 1086453
- Website: bowlinggreentwp.org

Bowling Green Township is one of the 25 townships of Licking County, Ohio, United States. As of the 2020 census, the population was 1,799.

== Geography ==
Located in the southeastern corner of the county, it borders the following townships:

- Franklin Township - north
- Hopewell Township - northeast
- Hopewell Township, Muskingum County - east
- Madison Township, Perry County - southeast corner
- Hopewell Township, Perry County - south
- Thorn Township, Perry County - southwest
- Licking Township - west

No municipalities are located in Bowling Green Township, although the census-designated place of Brownsville lies in the northeastern part of the township.

== Name and history ==
Statewide, the only other Bowling Green Township is located in Marion County. The township is located within the Refugee Tract.

== Government ==
The township is governed by a three-member board of trustees, who are elected in November of odd-numbered years to a four-year term beginning on the following January 1. Two are elected in the year after the presidential election and one is elected in the year before it. There is also an elected township fiscal officer, who serves a four-year term beginning on April 1 of the year after the election, which is held in November of the year before the presidential election. Vacancies in the fiscal officership or on the board of trustees are filled by the remaining trustees.
