= Gratiot, Ohio =

- Village
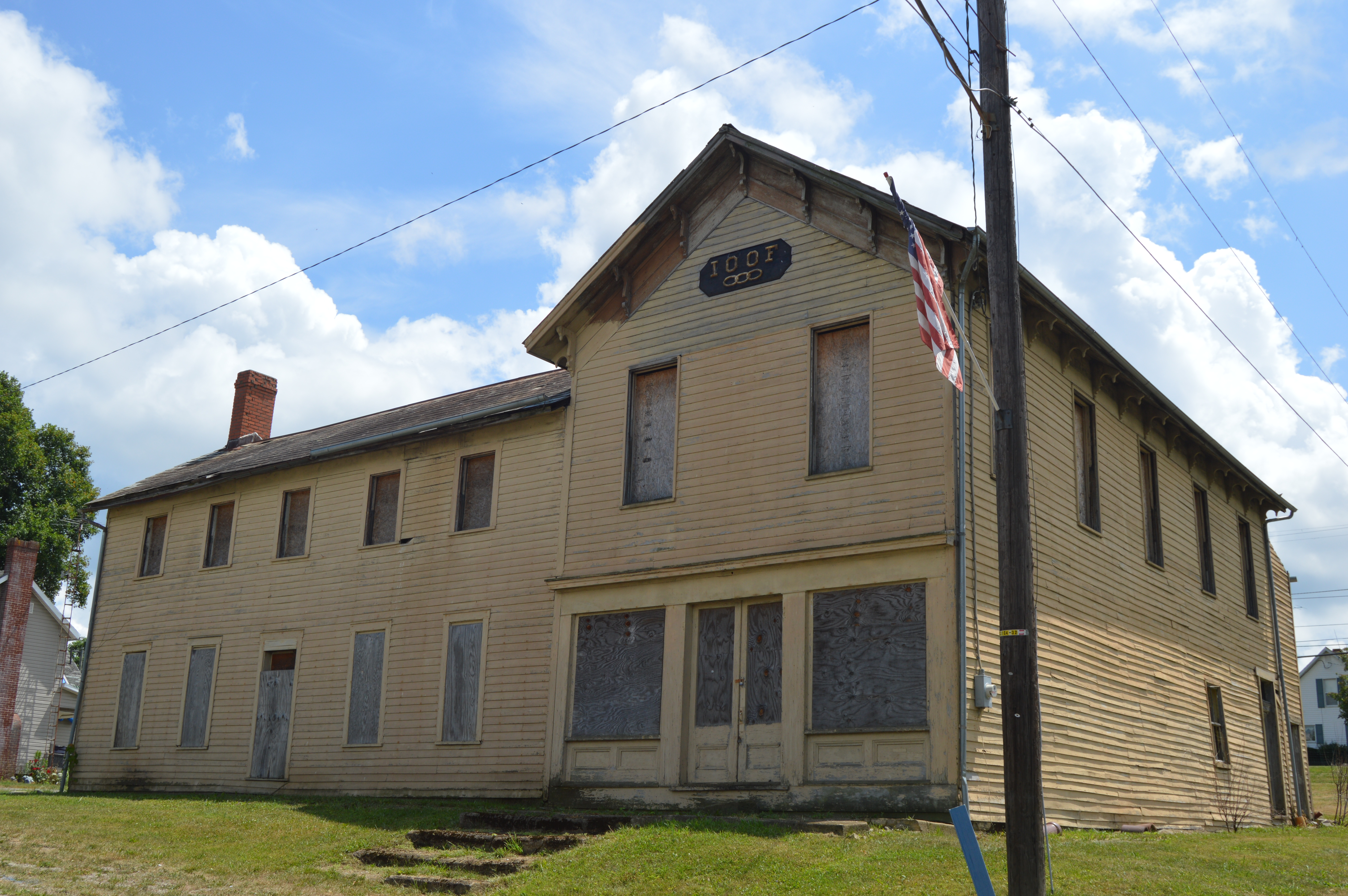
- IOOF hall on Main Street

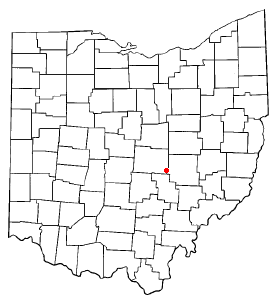
- Location of Gratiot, Ohio

- Location of Gratiot in Licking County (highlighted in red) and Muskingum County
- Coordinates: 39°57′05″N 82°13′00″W
- Country: United States
- State: Ohio
- Counties: Licking, Muskingum
- Townships: Hopewell (Licking Co.), Hopewell (Muskingum Co.)

Area
  - Total: 0.14 sq mi (0.35 km^{2})
  - Land: 0.14 sq mi (0.35 km^{2})
  - Water: 0 sq mi (0.00 km^{2})
- Elevation: 974 ft (297 m)

Population (2020)
  - Total: 215
  - Estimate (2023): 216
  - Density: 1,599.4/sq mi (617.54/km^{2})
- Time zone: UTC-5 (Eastern (EST))
  - Summer (DST): UTC-4 (EDT)
- ZIP code: 43740
- Area code: 740
- FIPS code: 39-31458
- GNIS feature ID: 2398196

Gratiot (/ˈɡreɪʃɒt/ GRAY-shot) is a village in Licking and Muskingum counties in the U.S. state of Ohio. The population was 215 at the 2020 census.

== History ==
Gratiot was platted in 1829, and named in honor of Charles Gratiot.

== Geography ==
According to the United States Census Bureau, the village has a total area of 0.13 square miles (0.34 km^{2}), all land.

== Demographics ==
Historical population
Census	Pop.	Note	%±
1880	67		—
1950	187		—
1960	222		18.7%
1970	232		4.5%
1980	227		−2.2%
1990	195		−14.1%
2000	187		−4.1%
2010	221		18.2%
2020	215		−2.7%
2023 (est.)	216	▲	0.5%
U.S. Decennial Census

=== 2010 census ===
At the 2010 census there were 221 people, 91 households, and 67 families living in the village. The population density was 1,700.0 inhabitants per square mile (656.4/km^{2}). There were 101 housing units at an average density of 776.9 per square mile (300.0/km^{2}). The racial makeup of the village was 98.6% White, 0.5% African American, and 0.9% from two or more races. Of the 91 households 23.1% had children under the age of 18 living with them, 58.2% were married couples living together, 9.9% had a female householder with no husband present, 5.5% had a male householder with no wife present, and 26.4% were non-families. 20.9% of households were one person and 12.1% were one person aged 65 or older. The average household size was 2.43 and the average family size was 2.81.

The median age in the village was 44.4 years. 19.5% of residents were under the age of 18; 7.3% were between the ages of 18 and 24; 25.8% were from 25 to 44; 32% were from 45 to 64; and 15.4% were 65 or older. The gender makeup of the village was 47.5% male and 52.5% female.

=== 2000 census ===
At the 2000 census there were 187 people, 77 households, and 50 families living in the village. The population density was 1,565.5 inhabitants per square mile (604.4/km^{2}). There were 82 housing units at an average density of 686.5 per square mile (265.1/km^{2}). The racial makeup of the village was 98.40% White, 1.07% African American, and 0.53% from two or more races. Of the 77 households 29.9% had children under the age of 18 living with them, 51.9% were married couples living together, 11.7% had a female householder with no husband present, and 33.8% were non-families. 28.6% of households were one person and 11.7% were one person aged 65 or older. The average household size was 2.43 and the average family size was 3.04.

The age distribution was 27.3% under the age of 18, 4.8% from 18 to 24, 31.6% from 25 to 44, 17.6% from 45 to 64, and 18.7% 65 or older. The median age was 37 years. For every 100 females there were 120.0 males. For every 100 females age 18 and over, there were 119.4 males.

The median household income was $34,250 and the median family income was $35,417. Males had a median income of $26,875 versus $23,333 for females. The per capita income for the village was $15,094. About 11.1% of families and 9.3% of the population were below the poverty line, including 11.3% of those under the age of eighteen and 11.5% of those sixty five or over.

== Notable people ==
- Cornelius S. Hamilton, U.S. Representative from Ohio
- Jesse Yarnell, newspaperman
