= Thurston, Ohio =

- Village
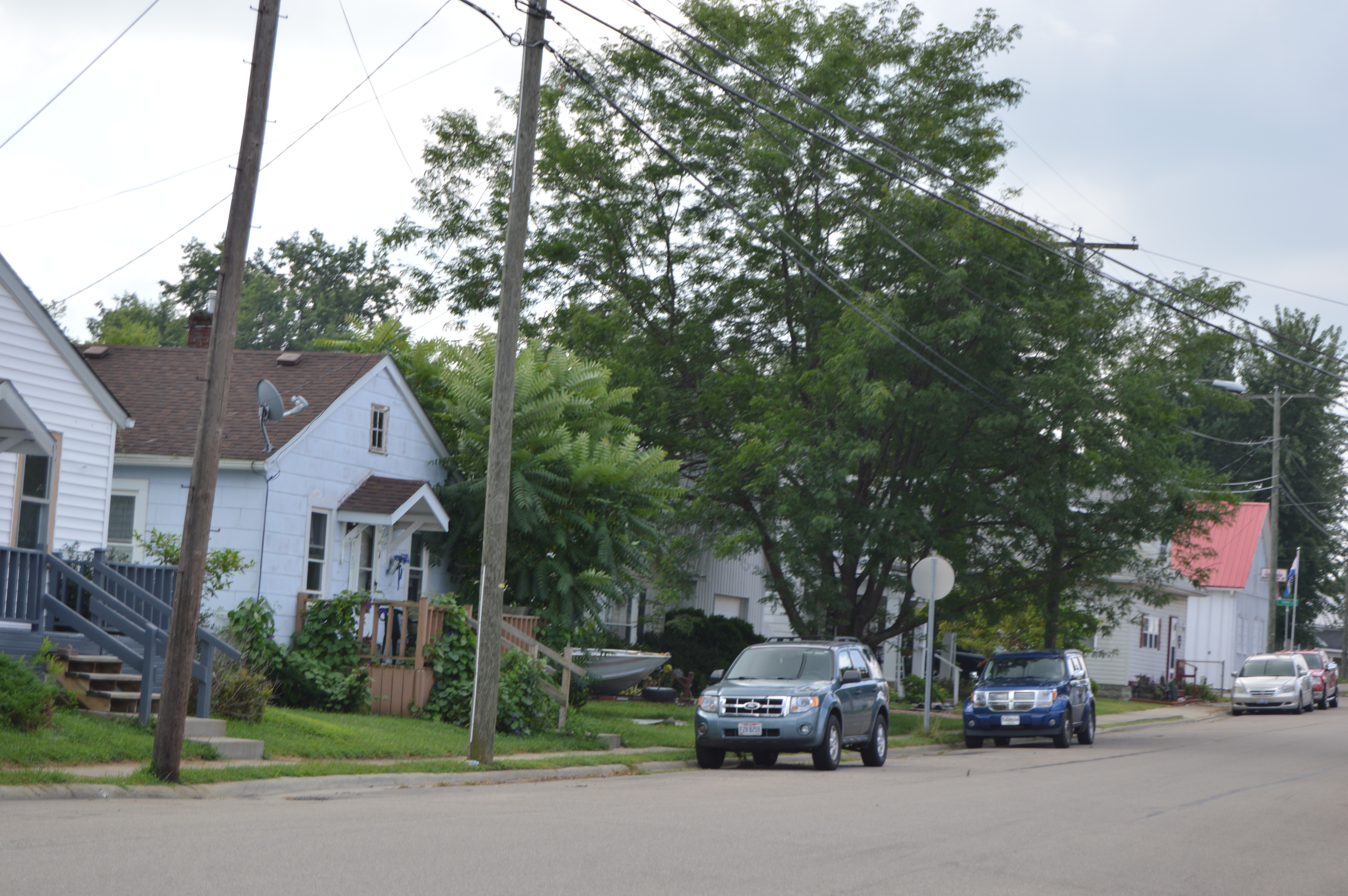
- Houses on High Street

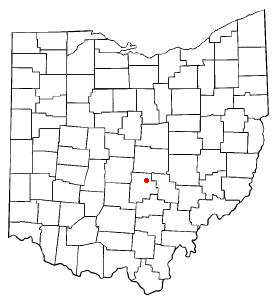
- Location of Thurston, Ohio

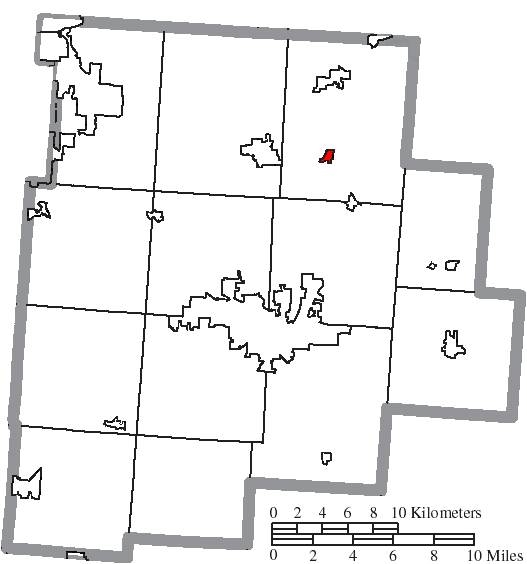
- Location of Thurston in Fairfield County
- Coordinates: 39°50′28″N 82°32′54″W
- Country: United States
- State: Ohio
- County: Fairfield

Area
  - Total: 0.41 sq mi (1.05 km^{2})
  - Land: 0.41 sq mi (1.05 km^{2})
  - Water: 0 sq mi (0.00 km^{2})
- Elevation: 873 ft (266 m)

Population (2020)
  - Total: 603
  - Density: 1,490.8/sq mi (575.62/km^{2})
- Time zone: UTC-5 (Eastern (EST))
  - Summer (DST): UTC-4 (EDT)
- ZIP code: 43157
- Area code: 740
- FIPS code: 39-76764
- GNIS feature ID: 2399978
- Website: https://www.thurstonohio.com/

Thurston is a village in Fairfield County, Ohio, United States. The population was 603 at the 2020 census.

== History ==
Thurston was originally called Bush City, and under the latter name was laid out in 1881. A post office called Thurston has been in operation since 1881.

== Geography ==
According to the United States Census Bureau, the village has a total area of 0.26 square miles (0.67 km^{2}), all land.

== Demographics ==
Historical population
Census	Pop.	Note	%±
1920	394		—
1930	430		9.1%
1940	424		−1.4%
1950	454		7.1%
1960	429		−5.5%
1970	428		−0.2%
1980	527		23.1%
1990	539		2.3%
2000	555		3.0%
2010	604		8.8%
2020	603		−0.2%
U.S. Decennial Census

=== 2010 census ===
As of the census of 2010, there were 604 people, 219 households, and 152 families living in the village. The population density was 2,323.1 inhabitants per square mile (897.0/km^{2}). There were 238 housing units at an average density of 915.4 per square mile (353.4/km^{2}). The racial makeup of the village was 95.4% White, 0.3% Native American, 0.2% Asian, 0.3% from other races, and 3.8% from two or more races. Hispanic or Latino of any race were 1.3% of the population.

There were 219 households, of which 43.4% had children under the age of 18 living with them, 48.4% were married couples living together, 12.8% had a female householder with no husband present, 8.2% had a male householder with no wife present, and 30.6% were non-families. 21.9% of all households were made up of individuals, and 8.7% had someone living alone who was 65 years of age or older. The average household size was 2.76 and the average family size was 3.18.

The median age in the village was 34.6 years. 29.1% of residents were under the age of 18; 8.5% were between the ages of 18 and 24; 28.2% were from 25 to 44; 22.5% were from 45 to 64; and 11.8% were 65 years of age or older. The gender makeup of the village was 48.0% male and 52.0% female.

=== 2000 census ===
As of the census of 2000, there were 555 people, 203 households, and 145 families living in the village. The population density was 2,145.3 inhabitants per square mile (828.3/km^{2}). There were 209 housing units at an average density of 807.9 per square mile (311.9/km^{2}). The racial makeup of the village was 96.04% White, 0.18% African American, 1.62% Native American, 0.36% Asian, and 1.80% from two or more races. Hispanic or Latino of any race were 0.18% of the population.

There were 203 households, out of which 36.5% had children under the age of 18 living with them, 51.2% were married couples living together, 13.8% had a female householder with no husband present, and 28.1% were non-families. 23.2% of all households were made up of individuals, and 9.4% had someone living alone who was 65 years of age or older. The average household size was 2.73 and the average family size was 3.12.

In the village, the population was spread out, with 29.7% under the age of 18, 9.0% from 18 to 24, 28.8% from 25 to 44, 20.9% from 45 to 64, and 11.5% who were 65 years of age or older. The median age was 34 years. For every 100 females there were 96.1 males. For every 100 females age 18 and over, there were 97.0 males.

The median income for a household in the village was $29,911, and the median income for a family was $30,000. Males had a median income of $23,438 versus $24,375 for females. The per capita income for the village was $14,381. About 9.3% of families and 9.9% of the population were below the poverty line, including 9.1% of those under age 18 and 11.8% of those age 65 or over.
