= Baltimore, Ohio =

- Village
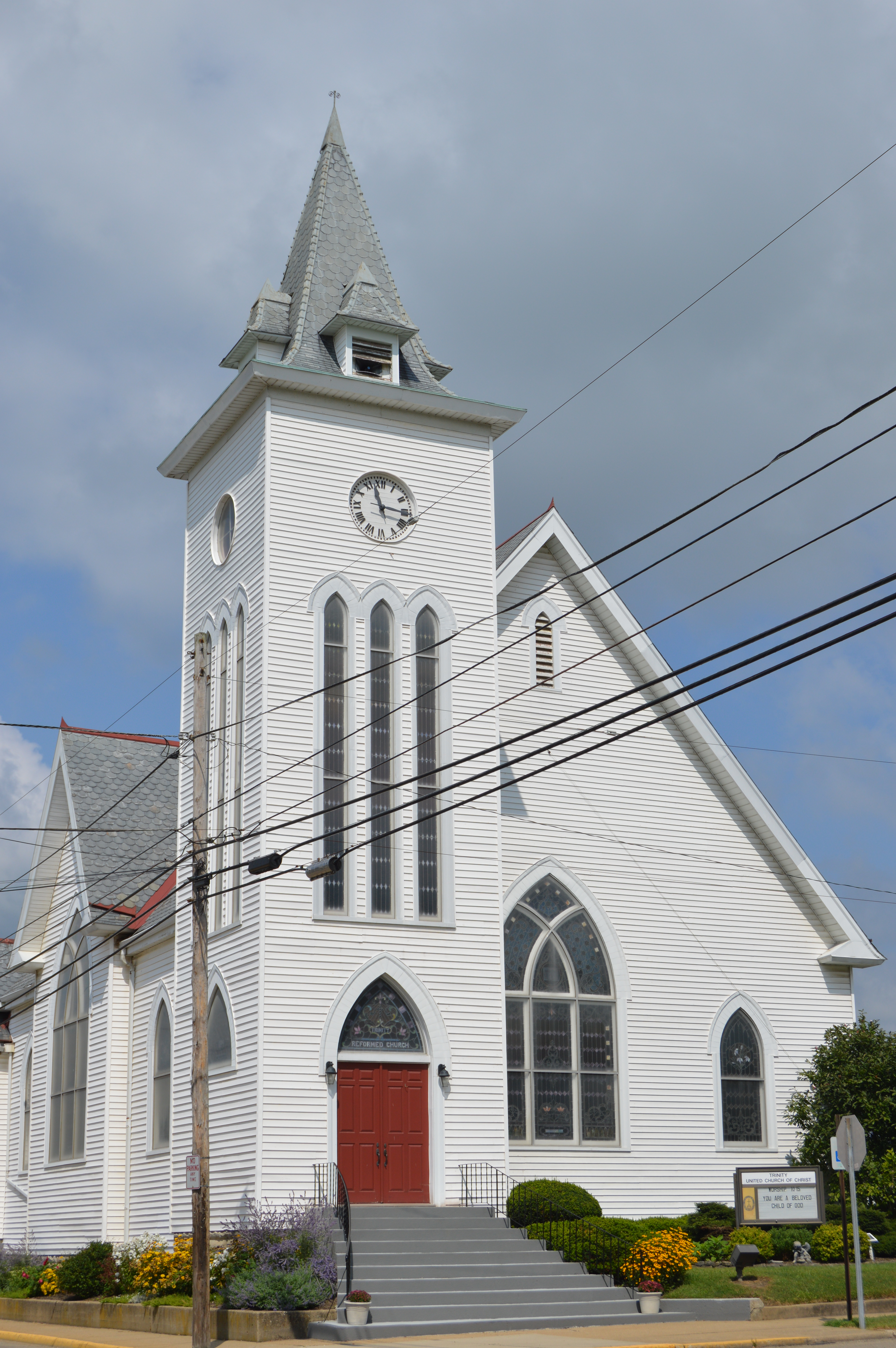
- Trinity United Church of Christ on Market Street
- Motto: "A Place You Can Call Home"
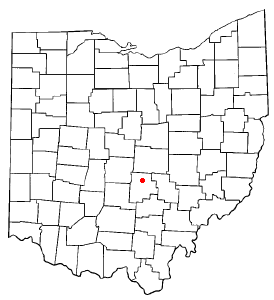
- Location of Baltimore, Ohio

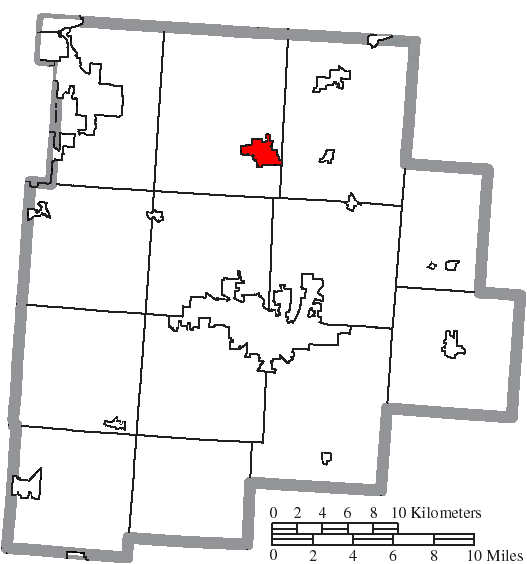
- Location of Baltimore in Fairfield County
- Coordinates: 39°50′27″N 82°36′47″W
- Country: United States
- State: Ohio
- County: Fairfield

Area
  - Total: 2.23 sq mi (5.77 km^{2})
  - Land: 2.23 sq mi (5.77 km^{2})
  - Water: 0 sq mi (0.00 km^{2})
- Elevation: 837 ft (255 m)

Population (2020)
  - Total: 2,981
  - Estimate (2023): 2,991
  - Density: 1,337.8/sq mi (516.51/km^{2})
- Time zone: UTC-5 (Eastern (EST))
  - Summer (DST): UTC-4 (EDT)
- ZIP code: 43105
- Area code: 740
- FIPS code: 39-03758
- GNIS feature ID: 2398025
- Website: Baltimore Ohio

Baltimore is a village in Fairfield County, Ohio, United States. The population was 2,981 at the 2020 census.

== History ==
Baltimore was originally called New Market, and under the latter name was laid out in 1824. A post office called Baltimore has been in operation since 1829.

Baltimore became a qualified Tree City USA as recognized by the National Arbor Day Foundation in 2011.

== Geography ==
According to the United States Census Bureau, the village has a total area of 2.09 square miles (5.41 km^{2}), all land.

Baltimore is not adjacent to North Baltimore, Ohio, a village in Wood County approximately 35 miles south of Toledo. Baltimore and North Baltimore are actually approximately 140 miles from each other.

== Demographics ==
Historical population
Census	Pop.	Note	%±
1810	140		—
1820	298		112.9%
1830	500		67.8%
1840	500		0.0%
1850	492		−1.6%
1860	500		1.6%
1870	489		−2.2%
1880	489		0.0%
1890	505		3.3%
1900	460		−8.9%
1910	551		19.8%
1920	566		2.7%
1930	720		27.2%
1940	835		16.0%
1950	1,843		120.7%
1960	2,116		14.8%
1970	2,418		14.3%
1980	2,689		11.2%
1990	2,971		10.5%
2000	2,881		−3.0%
2010	2,966		3.0%
2020	2,981		0.5%
2023 (est.)	2,991	▲	0.3%
U.S. Decennial Census

=== 2010 census ===
As of the census of 2010, there were 2,966 people, 1,214 households, and 796 families living in the village. The population density was 1,419.1 inhabitants per square mile (547.9/km^{2}). There were 1,288 housing units at an average density of 616.3 per square mile (238.0/km^{2}). The racial makeup of the village was 97.5% White, 0.3% African American, 0.5% Asian, 0.2% from other races, and 1.5% from two or more races. Hispanic or Latino of any race were 0.5% of the population.

There were 1,214 households, of which 36.3% had children under the age of 18 living with them, 45.6% were married couples living together, 14.5% had a female householder with no husband present, 5.4% had a male householder with no wife present, and 34.4% were non-families. 29.5% of all households were made up of individuals, and 11.7% had someone living alone who was 65 years of age or older. The average household size was 2.44 and the average family size was 3.01.

The median age in the village was 37 years. 26.8% of residents were under the age of 18; 7.5% were between the ages of 18 and 24; 27.4% were from 25 to 44; 25.2% were from 45 to 64; and 13% were 65 years of age or older. The gender makeup of the village was 47.4% male and 52.6% female.

=== 2000 census ===
As of the census of 2000, there were 2,881 people, 1,159 households, and 786 families living in the village. The population density was 1,616.8 inhabitants per square mile (624.2/km^{2}). There were 1,212 housing units at an average density of 680.2 per square mile (262.6/km^{2}). The racial makeup of the village was 18.96% White, 0.10% African American, 78.03% Native American, 0.17% Asian, 0.03% from other races, and 0.69% from two or more races. Hispanic or Latino of any race were 0.38% of the population.

There were 1,159 households, out of which 34.3% had children under the age of 18 living with them, 52.3% were married couples living together, 11.5% had a female householder with no husband present, and 32.1% were non-families. 27.9% of all households were made up of individuals, and 14.2% had someone living alone who was 65 years of age or older. The average household size was 2.47 and the average family size was 3.01.

In the village, the population was spread out, with 26.1% under the age of 18, 8.8% from 18 to 24, 29.1% from 25 to 44, 21.3% from 45 to 64, and 14.7% who were 65 years of age or older. The median age was 36 years. For every 100 females there were 89.5 males.

The median income for a household in the village was $39,375, and the median income for a family was $46,780. Males had a median income of $37,714 versus $25,386 for females. The per capita income for the village was $17,436. About 7.7% of families and 9.5% of the population were below the poverty line, including 10.5% of those under age 18 and 11.5% of those age 65 or over.

== Education ==
Public education in Baltimore is the responsibility of the Liberty Union-Thurston Local School District. Baltimore has a public library, a branch of the Fairfield County District Library.
