= Kirkersville, Ohio =

- Village
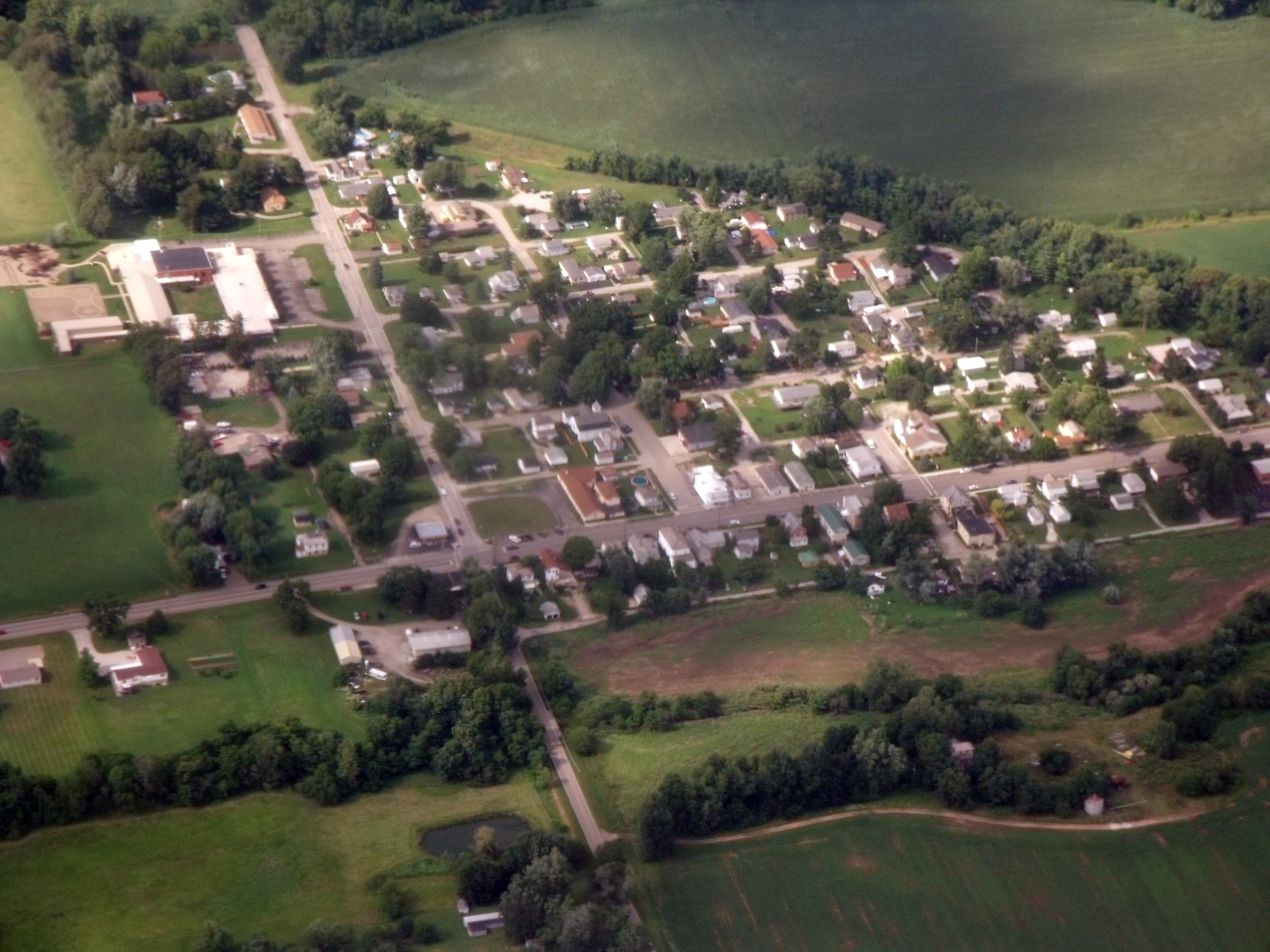
- Aerial photograph of Kirkersville

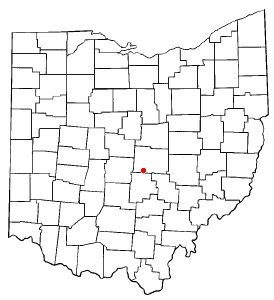
- Location of Kirkersville, Ohio

- Location of Kirkersville in Licking County
- Coordinates: 39°57′00″N 82°35′55″W
- Country: United States
- State: Ohio
- County: Licking

Area
  - Total: 2.24 sq mi (5.81 km^{2})
  - Land: 2.24 sq mi (5.80 km^{2})
  - Water: 0.0039 sq mi (0.01 km^{2})
- Elevation: 935 ft (285 m)

Population (2020)
  - Total: 471
  - Density: 210.2/sq mi (81.14/km^{2})
- Time zone: UTC-5 (Eastern (EST))
  - Summer (DST): UTC-4 (EDT)
- ZIP code: 43033
- Area code: 740
- FIPS code: 39-40572
- GNIS feature ID: 2398360
- Website: https://kirkersvilleohio.net/

Kirkersville is a village in Licking County, Ohio, United States, along the South Fork of the Licking River. The population was 471 at the 2020 census.

Kirkersville was platted in 1832 by William C. Kirker, and named for him.

== Geography ==
According to the United States Census Bureau, the village has a total area of 2.24 square miles (5.80 km^{2}), all land.

== Demographics ==
Historical population
Census	Pop.	Note	%±
1870	295		—
1910	297		—
1920	266		−10.4%
1930	279		4.9%
1940	264		−5.4%
1950	299		13.3%
1960	417		39.5%
1970	578		38.6%
1980	626		8.3%
1990	563		−10.1%
2000	520		−7.6%
2010	525		1.0%
2020	471		−10.3%
U.S. Decennial Census

=== 2010 census ===
As of the census of 2010, there were 525 people, 194 households, and 145 families living in the village. The population density was 234.4 inhabitants per square mile (90.5/km^{2}). There were 214 housing units at an average density of 95.5 per square mile (36.9/km^{2}). The racial makeup of the village was 94.5% White, 2.9% African American, 0.2% Native American, 1.1% Asian, 0.4% from other races, and 1.0% from two or more races. Hispanic or Latino of any race were 0.6% of the population.

There were 194 households, of which 36.1% had children under the age of 18 living with them, 56.2% were married couples living together, 12.4% had a female householder with no husband present, 6.2% had a male householder with no wife present, and 25.3% were non-families. 18.6% of all households were made up of individuals, and 5.1% had someone living alone who was 65 years of age or older. The average household size was 2.58 and the average family size was 2.95.

The median age in the village was 39.4 years. 22.7% of residents were under the age of 18; 7.2% were between the ages of 18 and 24; 26.2% were from 25 to 44; 33.9% were from 45 to 64; and 9.9% were 65 years of age or older. The gender makeup of the village was 51.6% male and 48.4% female.

=== 2000 census ===
As of the census of 2000, there were 520 people, 177 households, and 143 families living in the village. The population density was 264.8 inhabitants per square mile (102.2/km^{2}). There were 184 housing units at an average density of 93.7 per square mile (36.2/km^{2}). The racial makeup of the village was 97.50% White, 1.15% African American, 0.19% Asian, 0.58% Pacific Islander, 0.19% from other races, and 0.38% from two or more races. Hispanic or Latino of any race were 2.50% of the population.

There were 177 households, out of which 40.7% had children under the age of 18 living with them, 65.0% were married couples living together, 11.9% had a female householder with no husband present, and 19.2% were non-families. 15.8% of all households were made up of individuals, and 5.1% had someone living alone who was 65 years of age or older. The average household size was 2.81 and the average family size was 3.15.

In the village, the population was spread out, with 28.5% under the age of 18, 6.7% from 18 to 24, 29.6% from 25 to 44, 24.2% from 45 to 64, and 11.0% who were 65 years of age or older. The median age was 36 years. For every 100 females there were 103.1 males. For every 100 females age 18 and over, there were 97.9 males.

The median income for a household in the village was $45,833, and the median income for a family was $55,000. Males had a median income of $35,893 versus $25,481 for females. The per capita income for the village was $16,932. About 6.8% of families and 8.0% of the population were below the poverty line, including 15.8% of those under age 18 and none of those age 65 or over.

== See also ==
- Kirkersville shooting
