= Saltillo, Ohio =

Unincorporated community in Ohio, U.S.

Coordinates: 39°47′40″N 82°9′0″W

Saltillo is an unincorporated community in Perry County, in the U.S. state of Ohio. Main routes in Saltillo include Ohio State Route 669, Ohio State Route 345, and Clayton Township Highways 114 and 169. A river named the Buckeye Fork flows just south of Saltillo. A little east of Saltillo is Perry County Route 3 (Old Rainer Road), which leads to Roseville.

== History ==
Saltillo was founded in 1849 (176 years ago), but a tavern had operated on the town site for some time prior.
