= Rehoboth, Perry County, Ohio =

Unincorporated community in Ohio, U.S.

Coordinates: 39°44′37″N 82°11′35″W

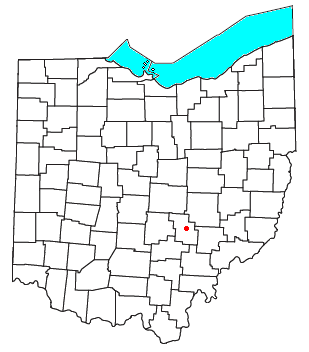
Location of Rehoboth, Ohio

Rehoboth is an unincorporated community in southern Clayton Township, Perry County, Ohio, United States. Rehoboth is located along State Route 345, a short distance north (2 miles) of the county seat of New Lexington, and its ZIP code of 43764 is New Lexington's ZIP code.

John and Eli Gardner platted Rehoboth in 1815. Expecting to see a new county created in the area, they included a public square and space for a courthouse in their plat. Two years later, when Perry County was formed, Rehoboth narrowly lost to Somerset in an election to determine the county seat. In later years, tobacco farming became the mainstay of Perry County's economy, and Rehoboth was the center of the tobacco-growing region.
