= Rose Farm, Ohio =

- Census-designated place
- Location within Ohio Location within the United States
- Coordinates: 39°44′09″N 82°04′40″W
- Country: United States
- State: Ohio
- Counties: Morgan, Perry
- Townships: York, Harrison

Area
  - Total: 0.147 sq mi (0.38 km^{2})
  - Land: 0.146 sq mi (0.38 km^{2})
  - Water: 0.001 sq mi (0.0026 km^{2})
- Elevation: 771 ft (235 m)

Population (2020)
  - Total: 111
  - Density: 760.3/sq mi (293.6/km^{2})
- Time zone: UTC-5 (Eastern (EST))
  - Summer (DST): UTC-4 (EDT)
- ZIP Code: 43731 (Crooksville)
- FIPS code: 39-68448
- GNIS feature ID: 2628963

Rose Farm is an unincorporated community and census-designated place (CDP) in southwestern York Township, Morgan County, and southeastern Harrison Township, Perry County, Ohio, United States. The population was 111 at the 2020 census.

== Geography ==
Rose Farm is in northwestern Morgan County, with a small portion extending west into Perry County. It lies along the south side of State Route 669 at its intersection with McKinley Street. Route 669 leads northwest 3 miles (5 km) to Crooksville and east-southeast 20 miles (32 km) to McConnelsville, the Morgan county seat. (Via local roads, McConnelsville is just 16 miles (26 km) southeast of Rose Farm.)

There are three east-west streets in Rose Farm: 1st, 2nd, and 3rd Street, running parallel to State Route 669. North-south streets are McKinley, Garfield, and Lincoln. Argo Road is in the southern part of the community. McKinley Street continues south out of Rose Farm as County Road 75, leading south 4 miles (6 km) to State Route 37 at Sayre.

According to the U.S. Census Bureau, the Rose Farm CDP has a total area of 0.15 square miles (0.39 km^{2}), of which 0.001 square miles (0.003 km^{2}), or 0.68%, are water. Black Fork runs through the community, flowing north to meet Moxahala Creek at Brigglesville, just south of Crooksville. Moxahala Creek is in turn a tributary of the Muskingum River, which flows southeast to the Ohio River.

The Rose Farm Church of Christ (located on the corner of McKinley and 2nd Streets) is the only non-residential building in use within the community. The other non-residential building is the old Rose Farm School, which is a two-room school house that served 1st through 8th grades until its closure in the mid-1960s.

== Notable people ==
- Mell G. Underwood, congressman for Ohio and U.S. district judge
