= Buckeye Creek =

Buckeye Creek may refer to:

- Buckeye Creek (Apple Creek), a stream in Missouri
- Buckeye Creek (Cedar Creek), a tributary of Cedar Creek in the Skunk River (Iowa) watershed in Iowa
- Buckeye Creek (East Walker River), a tributary of the East Walker River in California
- Buckeye Creek (Georgia), a tributary of the Oconee River
- Buckeye Creek (Gualala River), a tributary of the Gualala River in California
- Buckeye Creek (Iowa River), a tributary of the Iowa River in Iowa
- Buckeye Creek (Nevada), a tributary of the East Fork Carson River
- Buckeye Creek (Ohio), a tributary of Salt Lick Creek in the Scioto River watershed
- Buckeye Creek (Oklahoma), a tributary of the Deep Fork River
- Buckeye Creek (Sacramento River), a tributary of the Sacramento River in California
- Buckeye Creek (West Virginia), a tributary of Middle Island Creek

== See also ==
- Buckeye Fork
