= East Fultonham, Ohio =

- Census-designated place
- Location within Ohio Location within the United States
- Coordinates: 39°50′48″N 82°07′30″W
- Country: United States
- State: Ohio
- County: Muskingum
- Township: Newton

Area
  - Total: 0.54 sq mi (1.4 km^{2})
  - Land: 0.40 sq mi (1.0 km^{2})
  - Water: 0.14 sq mi (0.36 km^{2})
- Elevation: 758 ft (231 m)

Population (2020)
  - Total: 290
  - Density: 723.2/sq mi (279.2/km^{2})
- Time zone: UTC-5 (Eastern (EST))
  - Summer (DST): UTC-4 (EDT)
- ZIP Codes: 43735 (East Fultonham); 43777 (Roseville)
- FIPS code: 39-23534
- GNIS feature ID: 2628887

East Fultonham is an unincorporated community and census-designated place in Newton Township, Muskingum County, Ohio, United States. It has a post office with the ZIP code 43735. The population was 290 at the 2020 census.

== History ==
East Fultonham had its start when the railroad was extended to that point. The community was named for its location east of Fultonham.

== Geography ==
East Fultonham is in southwestern Muskingum County, southwest of the center of Newton Township. It is located along U.S. Route 22 a short distance east of the village of Fultonham. Via US 22, it is 9 miles (14 km) northeast to Zanesville, the Muskingum county seat, and 10 miles (16 km) west-southwest to Somerset. Ohio State Route 345 runs along the western edge of East Fultonham, with its northern terminus at US 22. To the south it leads 12 miles (19 km) to New Lexington.

According to the U.S. Census Bureau, the East Fultonham CDP has a total area of 0.54 square miles (1.40 km^{2}), of which 0.40 square miles (1.04 km^{2}) are land and 0.14 square miles (0.36 km^{2}), or 25.2%, are water. Jonathan Creek runs along the northern edge of the community, and its tributary the Buckeye Fork comes in from the south. Lake Isabel fills the valley between the two creeks in the eastern part of the CDP. Jonathan Creek flows east to Moxahala Creek at Avondale and is part of the Muskingum River watershed.

Historical population
Census	Pop.	Note	%±
2010	335		—
2020	290		−13.4%
U.S. Decennial Census

== Notable people ==
- Thomas A. Hendricks, 21st vice president of the United States
