= Pike Township, Indiana =

Pike Township, Indiana may refer to one of the following places:

- Pike Township, Jay County, Indiana
- Pike Township, Marion County, Indiana
- Pike Township, Ohio County, Indiana
- Pike Township, Warren County, Indiana

== See also ==
- Pike Township (disambiguation)
