= Saltillo (disambiguation) =

Saltillo may refer to one of the following:

== Places ==
Belize

- Saltillo, Belize

Mexico

- Saltillo, Coahuila, state capital
- Saltillo, a town in Las Margaritas, Chiapas

United States

- Saltillo, Indiana, a town
- Saltillo, Mississippi, a town
- Saltillo, Nebraska, unincorporated community
- Saltillo, Ohio, a village
- Saltillo, Pennsylvania, a borough
- Saltillo, Tennessee, a town
- Saltillo, Texas, an unincorporated community
- Saltillo (Adjuntas), a barrio of Adjuntas, Puerto Rico
- Saltillo, Arkansas, a town

== Other uses ==
- Saltillo (linguistics), a name given to the glottal stop consonant in Mexican linguistics
- Saltillo affair, a scandal involving the Portuguese national football team during the 1986 FIFA World Cup in Mexico
- Saltillo tile, a terra-cotta tile originating in Saltillo, Mexico

== Musicians ==
- Menton J. Matthews III, an American multi-instrumentalist known by the stage name Saltillo
