= Bowman Mill Covered Bridge =

- U.S. National Register of Historic Places
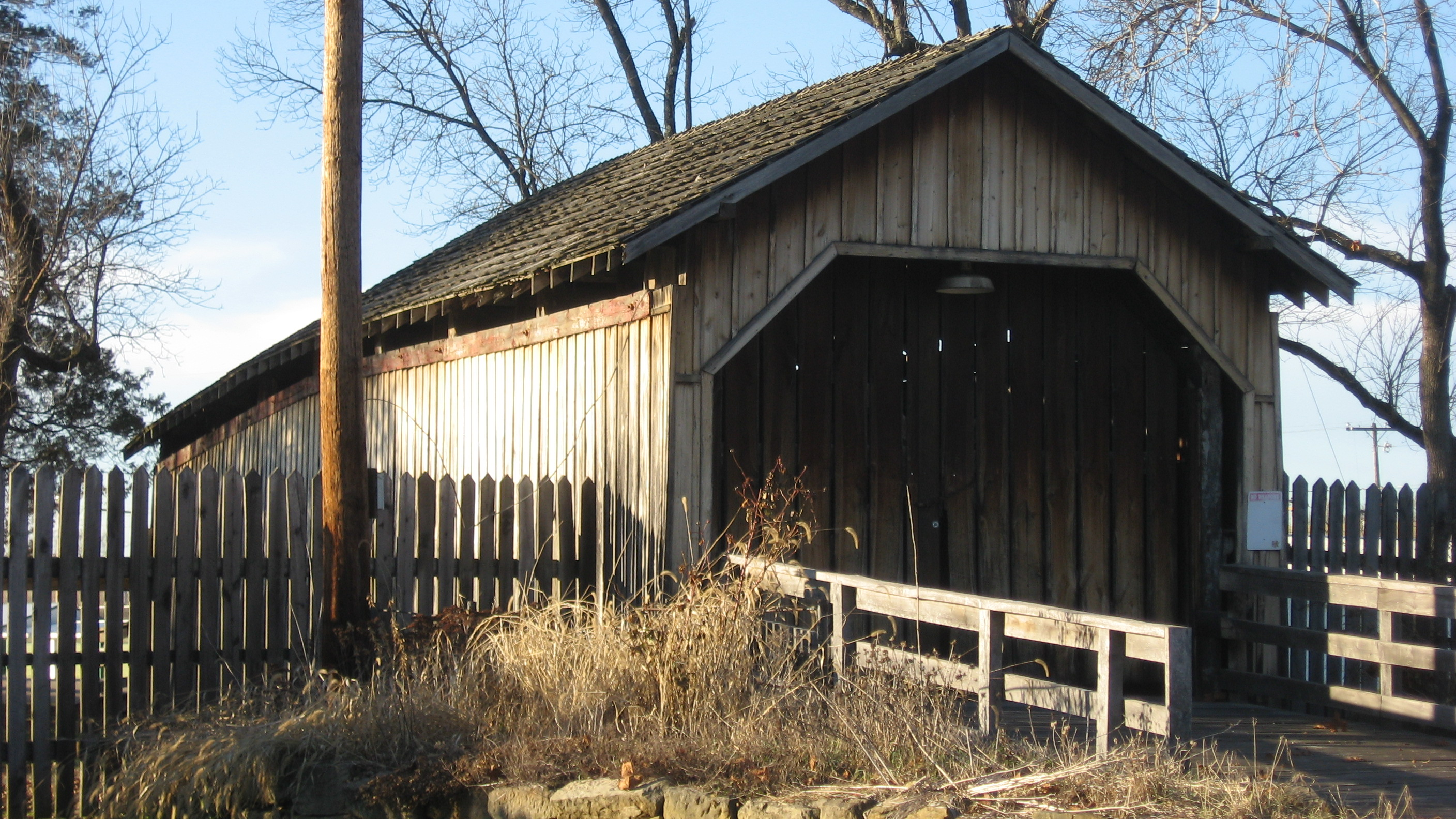
- Photo from 2013, at Perry County Fairgrounds

- Location within Ohio
- Nearest city: New Reading, Ohio
- Coordinates: 39°47′53″N 82°21′40″W
- Area: less than one acre
- Built: 1880
- Built by: Bowman, Lank
- Architectural style: Multiple kingpost truss
- NRHP reference No.: 78002169
- Added to NRHP: February 8, 1978

The Bowman Mill Covered Bridge, in Perry County, Ohio, is a multiple kingpost truss covered bridge which was built in 1880. It was listed on the National Register of Historic Places in 1978.

It was a work of Lank Bowman. It has also been termed the Rush Creek Covered Bridge and the Readington Covered Bridge.

It was located south of New Reading, on Winegardner Rd.

It is now located in the Perry County Fairgrounds in Pike Township, at 39.720833°N 82.224250°W, at the intersection of Broadway (Ohio State Route 37) and Thorn Street near New Lexington. It was moved to the fairgrounds in 1987
