= Pike Township, Ohio =

Pike Township, Ohio may refer to:

- Pike Township, Brown County, Ohio
- Pike Township, Clark County, Ohio
- Pike Township, Coshocton County, Ohio
- Pike Township, Fulton County, Ohio
- Pike Township, Knox County, Ohio
- Pike Township, Madison County, Ohio
- Pike Township, Perry County, Ohio
- Pike Township, Stark County, Ohio

== See also ==
- Pike Township (disambiguation)
