= Ohio State Route 719 =

State highway in Muskingum County, Ohio, US

State Route 719

Route information
- Maintained by ODOT
- Length: 0.61 mi (980 m)
- Existed: by 1989–present

Major junctions
- West end: US 22 / SR 93 in South Zanesville
- East end: SR 555 in Zanesville

Location
- Country: United States
- State: Ohio
- Counties: Muskingum

Highway system
- Ohio State Highway System; Interstate; US; State; Scenic
| ← SR 718 | → SR 720 |

State Route 719 (SR 719) is a very short east–west state highway located in central Ohio in the United States. Situated within the southernmost sections of the city of Zanesville as well as parts of South Zanesville and Springfield Township, SR 719 is a four-lane, undivided route whose primary purpose is to connect the concurrency of U.S. Route 22 (US 22) and SR 93 (Maysville Avenue) at its western end with SR 555 at its eastern end, which, in turn, meets SR 60 just across the Muskingum River from SR 719's eastern terminus.

== Route description ==
SR 719, which is located entirely within Muskingum County, is not included within the National Highway System.

The short journey of SR 719 begins at the signalized intersection with US 22/SR 93 (Maysville Avenue) and Clay Street on the boundary between South Zanesville and Zanesville. The highway immediately crosses railroad tracks, then comes upon the signalized intersection it has with June Parkway. Heading east from there, the four-lane undivided roadway is bounded by a steep embankment on each side of the roadway, with woods abutting the top of each of the embankments, as it ducks briefly into Springfield Township before re-entering Zanesville just prior to arriving at its endpoint, a signalized intersection with SR 555 and Moxahala Avenue approximately one block west of SR 555's crossing of the Muskingum River, which is immediately west of that route's junction with SR 60.

== History ==
SR 719 was first planned along its current route in the 1970s as County Road 719. The proposed county road was planned concurrently with the proposed SR 555 bridge over the Muskingum River. Constructed between 1989 and 1992, SR 719 was constructed on an entirely new alignment and has not experienced any changes in its routing.

== Major intersections ==
The entire route is in Muskingum County.

| Location | mi | km | Destinations | Notes |
|---|---|---|---|---|
| South Zanesville–Zanesville municipal line | 0.00 | 0.00 | US 22 / SR 93 (Maysville Avenue) / Clay Street | Western terminus of SR 719 |
| Zanesville | 0.61 | 0.98 | SR 555 (Old River Road) to SR 60 / SR 146 / Moxahala Avenue | Eastern terminus of SR 719 |
1.000 mi = 1.609 km; 1.000 km = 0.621 mi
