= Clay Township, Muskingum County, Ohio =

Township in Ohio, US

Clay Township, Muskingum County Ohio
- Township
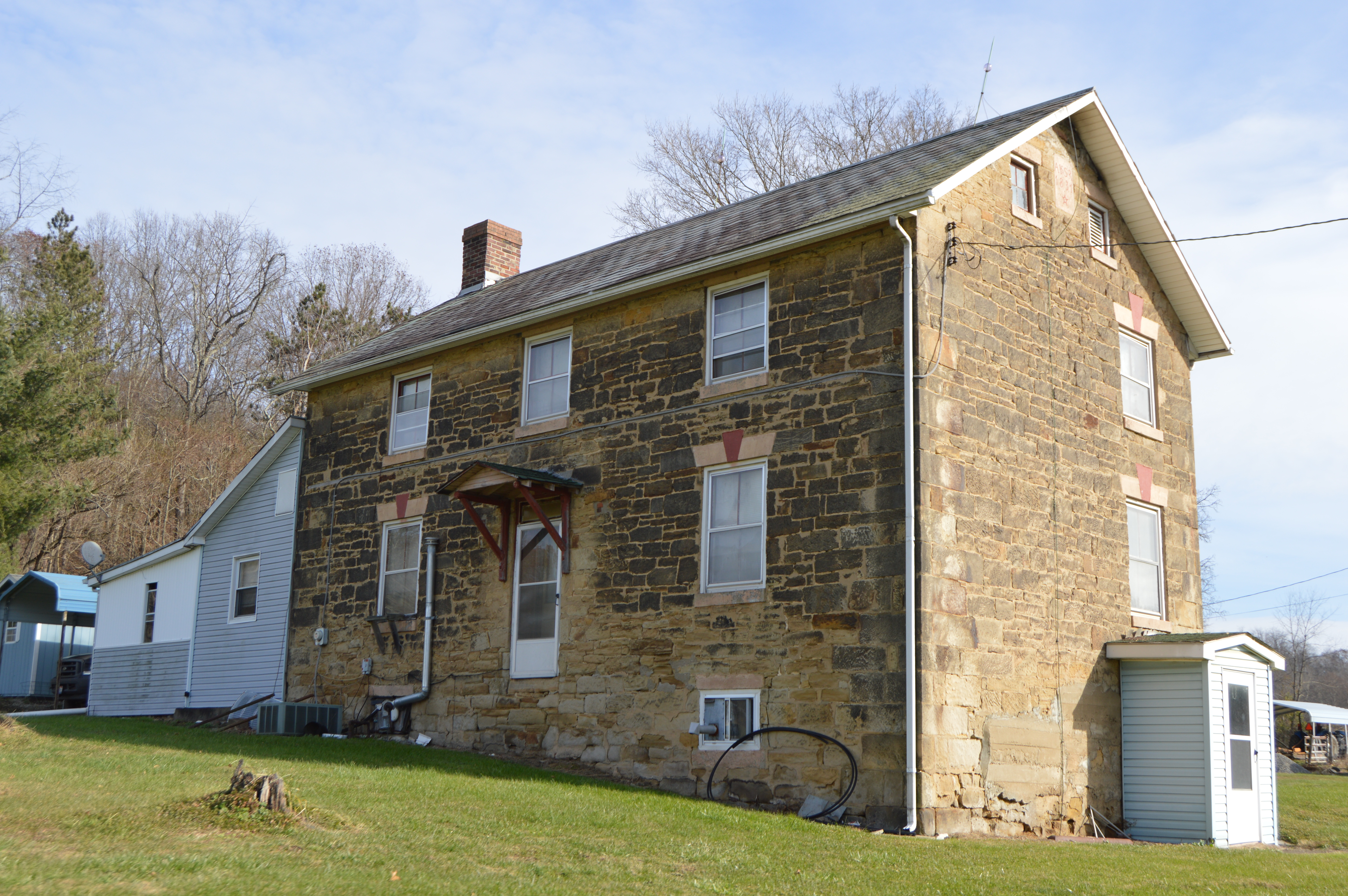
- Adam Rider House near Roseville

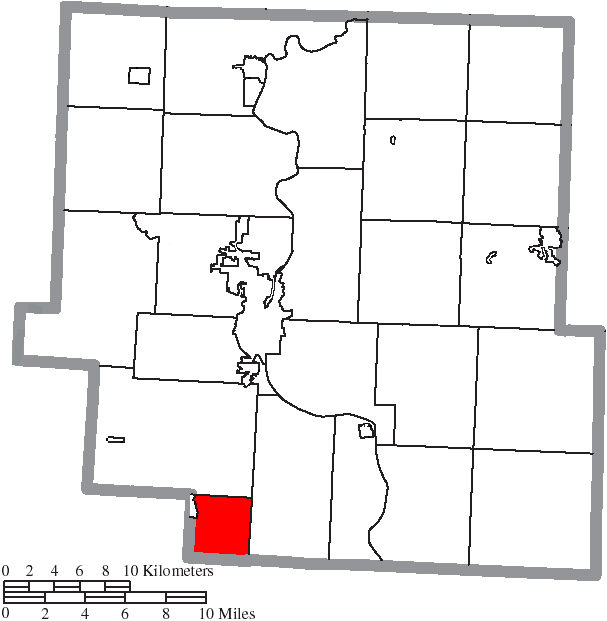
- Location of Clay Township in Muskingum County
- Coordinates: 39°47′34″N 82°3′33″W
- Country: United States
- State: Ohio
- County: Muskingum

Area
  - Total: 9.4 sq mi (24.4 km^{2})
  - Land: 9.4 sq mi (24.3 km^{2})
  - Water: 0 sq mi (0.0 km^{2})
- Elevation: 896 ft (273 m)

Population (2020)
  - Total: 971
  - Density: 103/sq mi (40.0/km^{2})
- Time zone: UTC-5 (Eastern (EST))
  - Summer (DST): UTC-4 (EDT)
- FIPS code: 39-15532
- GNIS feature ID: 1086717

Clay Township is one of the twenty-five townships of Muskingum County, Ohio, United States. The 2020 census found 971 people in the township.

== Geography ==
Located in the southwestern corner of the county, it borders the following townships:

- Newton Township - north
- Brush Creek Township - east
- York Township, Morgan County - south
- Harrison Township, Perry County - west

Part of the village of Roseville is located in northwestern Clay Township.

== Name and history ==
It is one of nine Clay Townships statewide.

== Government ==
The township is governed by a three-member board of trustees, who are elected in November of odd-numbered years to a four-year term beginning on the following January 1. Two are elected in the year after the presidential election and one is elected in the year before it. There is also an elected township fiscal officer, who serves a four-year term beginning on April 1 of the year after the election, which is held in November of the year before the presidential election. Vacancies in the fiscal officership or on the board of trustees are filled by the remaining trustees.
