= Dizzy Nutter =

American baseball player (1893-1958)

- Center fielder
- Born: August 27, 1893; Roseville, Ohio, US
- Died: July 25, 1958 (aged 64); Battle Creek, Michigan, US
- Batted: Left Threw: Right

MLB debut
- September 7, 1919, for the Boston Braves

Last MLB appearance
- September 26, 1919, for the Boston Braves

MLB statistics
- Batting average: .212
- Hits: 11
- Runs batted in: 3
- Stats at Baseball Reference

Teams
- Boston Braves (1919)

Everett Clarence "Dizzy" Nutter (August 27, 1893 – July 25, 1958) was an American professional baseball player. In an eight-year career, Nutter played in one major league season with the Boston Braves in 1919. He was listed as 5 feet 9 inches (175 cm) in height and weighed 160 pounds (73 kg).

== Biography ==
=== Early life ===
Nutter was born Everett Clarence Nutter on August 27, 1893, in Roseville, Ohio.

=== Career ===
In 1914, Nutter began his professional baseball career playing for the D-level Charleston Senators of the Ohio State League. During the 1914 season, Nutter recorded a .271 batting average with 108 hits and seven home runs. He continued his minor-league career in 1915 with Charleston before joining the B-level New Haven Murlins in 1916. Nutter played in New Haven for two years before his contract was purchased by the Boston Braves on August 29, 1919. He made his major league debut for the Boston Braves on September 7, 1919, in a game against the New York Giants, playing played center field and recording two hits in four plate appearances.

After playing eighteen games for the Braves during which he batted .212, Nutter returned to New Haven for the remainder of the 1919 season. For the New Haven Weissmen, he led the team in hits, doubles, and triples during the 1919 and 1920 seasons. Nutter's last season of professional baseball was in 1922 for the New Haven Weissmen.

=== After baseball ===
Nutter died on July 25, 1958, in Battle Creek, Michigan, and was buried in Rose Hill Cemetery in Roseville, Ohio.
