= Mount Perry =

Mount Perry may refer to:

- Mount Perry, Ohio, an unincorporated community in northern Madison Township, Perry County, Ohio, United States
- Mount Perry, Queensland, a small town in the North Burnett Region in southeastern Queensland, Australia
  - Mount Perry, the highest mountain in the area
