= McCoy (pottery) =

Brand of pottery produced in the United States

Nelson McCoy Pottery Co.
- Company type: Private company
- Industry: Pottery
- Founded: 1910
- Defunct: 2001
- Headquarters: Roseville, Ohio, United States
- Key people: Nelson McCoy Sr., Nelson McCoy Jr., Nelson Melick
- Products: Coffee mugs, pitchers, bowls, vases

McCoy is a brand of pottery that was produced in Roseville, Ohio, in the 20th century. It was produced from 1910 until 1990 and remains one of the most widely collected types of pottery in the United States.

== History ==
=== Nelson McCoy Sanitary and Stoneware Company ===
Two McCoy #7112 mugs in the Brown Drip glaze pattern. (made in 1974)

In April 1910, Nelson McCoy Sr., with help from his father J.W. McCoy and five stockholders, established the Nelson McCoy Sanitary and Stoneware Company in Roseville, Ohio. The pottery produced utilitarian stoneware and operated successfully until about 1918.

In 1918, the pottery joined with eleven other stoneware potteries to form the American Clay Products Company (ACPC), which was based in Zanesville, Ohio. All member potteries produced stoneware that was marketed by the new company. The ACPC produced sales catalogs of the wares that were produced, which purposely had no trademark, and had salesmen to advertise and take orders. The pottery orders received by the company were shared among the different potteries based on production capability, and revenue was proportionally distributed.

The ACPC thrived until January 1926, at which time the company was liquidated. The demise of the company released the former member potteries to once again become independent and compete with one another. Around this time, the demand for utilitarian stoneware was beginning to decrease.

In order to re-establish its own identity, and also to reflect the changing times, the company had changed its name to the Nelson McCoy Sanitary Stoneware Company by 1929. It was around then that the company began the practice of marking its wares; no evidence has been found that the company marked any of its pieces prior to this time.

=== Nelson McCoy Pottery Company ===
In 1933, in response to a further decreased demand for food and sanitary wares, and an increased demand for decorative pieces, the name of the company was changed again to Nelson McCoy Pottery Co.

Nelson McCoy Sr., Nelson Melick, and later Nelson McCoy Jr. operated the pottery for 57 years until it was sold in 1967 to the owners of the Mt. Clemens Pottery Co., although Nelson McCoy Jr. remained as president of the pottery.

=== Decline ===
The Lancaster Colony Corporation purchased the pottery in 1974. In 1981 Nelson McCoy Jr., retired. In 1985, the pottery was sold once again, this time to Designer Accents of New Jersey. Some months earlier, Designer Accents had acquired two other potteries, Holiday Designs of Sebring, Ohio, and their Sebring Studios division. Designer Accents also acquired the Sunstone Pottery of Cambridge, Ohio.

All production at these potteries was moved to the Nelson McCoy Pottery facility in Roseville. Production of some wares continued, and others were discontinued. Selected items previously made by the McCoy pottery, and some newly designed items, were marketed by Designer Accents under the name Nelson McCoy Ceramics. Some of these items have the familiar McCoy name on them. The Floraline line with its distinctive mark, first produced by the Nelson McCoy Pottery in 1960, was continued.

Designer Accents operated for about five years until closing in late 1990.

The former Nelson McCoy factory was taken over by Burley Clay Products Company in 1998 and has been their production site since 2000.

== Trademark history ==
The United States Patent and Trademark Office lists three individuals or companies that have applied for a Trademark using the name "McCoy" for use on pottery.

- Designer Accents, Inc., the final owner of the Nelson McCoy Pottery Company, filed the first of these applications on June 7, 1989. In the fall of 1990, the pottery closed. The application was canceled on December 20, 1997.
- On August 31, 1992, Roger Jensen from Rockwood, Tennessee, applied for use of the name "McCoy" as a trademark on pottery he made. The application stated that the first use of the proposed trademark was in January 1991. The application was canceled on May 25, 1999.
- A year before the Jensen application was canceled, Designer Accents, Inc., reapplied. This was on August 19, 1998. This application was abandoned on July 31, 2000.
- On October 28, 1999, Rosella Martin of Century, Florida, made application to use the name "McCoy" on numerous types of pottery she produced. On May 24, 2001, this application was abandoned.

== Chronology ==
- 1848 - Small Factory opened by W. N. McCoy
- 1886 - J.W. McCoy opened Williams & (JW) McCoy Pottery Co.
- 1890 - Merged & Renamed Kildow, Williams & McCoy Pottery Co.
- 1892 - Renamed Midland Pottery Co.
- 1898 - Sold to Roseville Pottery Co.
- 1910 - J.W. McCoy assisted his son, Nelson, in establishing "Nelson McCoy Sanitary Stoneware"
- 1911 - J.W. McCoy Pottery Company acquired by George Brush and it became "Brush-McCoy Pottery Co."
- 1918 - McCoy family sold interest in Brush-McCoy but name did not change until 1925
- 1933 - Nelson McCoy Sanitary Stoneware simplified name to Nelson McCoy Pottery Co.
- 1967 - Sold to Mount Clemens Pottery Co.
- 1974 - Sold to Lancaster Colony
- 1981 - Nelson McCoy Jr. stopped working at Nelson McCoy Pottery Co.
- 1982 - Brush-McCoy ceased operation
- 1985 - Nelson McCoy Pottery Co. sold to Designer Accents & merged with their company, renamed "Nelson McCoy Ceramics"
- 1989 - Designer Accent Applies for use of Trademark McCoy on Pottery
- 1990 - Nelson McCoy Ceramics ceased operation
- 1991 - Roger Jensen begins using McCoy trademark on pottery he produced in Tennessee
- 1992 - Roger Jensen applies for use of McCoy trademark on Pottery
- 1997 - Designer Accents' 1989 Trademark Application cancelled
- 1998 - Designer Accent Applies a second time for use of Trademark McCoy on Pottery
- 1999 - Roger Jensen's 1992 Trademark application was cancelled
- 1999 - Rosella Martin applies to use the McCoy Trademark on pottery produced in Florida
- 2000 - Designer Accents abandoned second McCoy Trademark Application
- 2001 - Rosella Martin abandoned McCoy Trademark Application
