= Burley Clay Products Company =

American garden pottery company

- Company type: Private
- Industry: Pottery
- Founded: 1923
- Headquarters: Roseville, Ohio, United States
- Website: burleyclay.com

Burley Clay Products Company, based in Roseville, Ohio, is an American manufacturer of clay garden pottery.

== History ==
The company was incorporated on April 27, 1923, by Samuel Burley, Zane Burley, Florence Burley, John Burley, and Emmett Burley, who all had backgrounds in the pottery industry. The first factory was along Maysville Pike in South Zanesville, Ohio and started out with two kilns. Burley Clay Products initially made stoneware crocks and jugs, but sold that business in 1927 to focus on making garden pottery.

The Burley company became known for their use of jiggering to form stoneware bird baths, flowerpots, and jardinieres from local clay.

In 1984 the Burley family sold the company to Steven McCann, who purchased the former Nelson McCoy facility in Roseville, Ohio, in 1998. The McCoy factory had been out of operation since 1990 and it took three years to return it to a usable state for Burley.

After relocating to Roseville, Burley became a prominent sponsor of the Crooksville-Roseville Pottery Festival.

== See also ==
- McCoy Pottery
- Roseville Pottery
