= Springfield Township, Ohio =

Springfield Township may be any of these places in the U.S. state of Ohio:

- Springfield Township, Clark County, Ohio
- Springfield Township, Gallia County, Ohio
- Springfield Township, Hamilton County, Ohio
- Springfield Township, Jefferson County, Ohio
- Springfield Township, Lucas County, Ohio
- Springfield Township, Mahoning County, Ohio
- Springfield Township, Muskingum County, Ohio
- Springfield Township, Richland County, Ohio
- Springfield Township, Ross County, Ohio
- Springfield Township, Summit County, Ohio
- Springfield Township, Williams County, Ohio

== See also ==
- Springfield, Ohio, a city in Clark County
