= Reading Township, Perry County, Ohio =

Township in Ohio, US

- Township
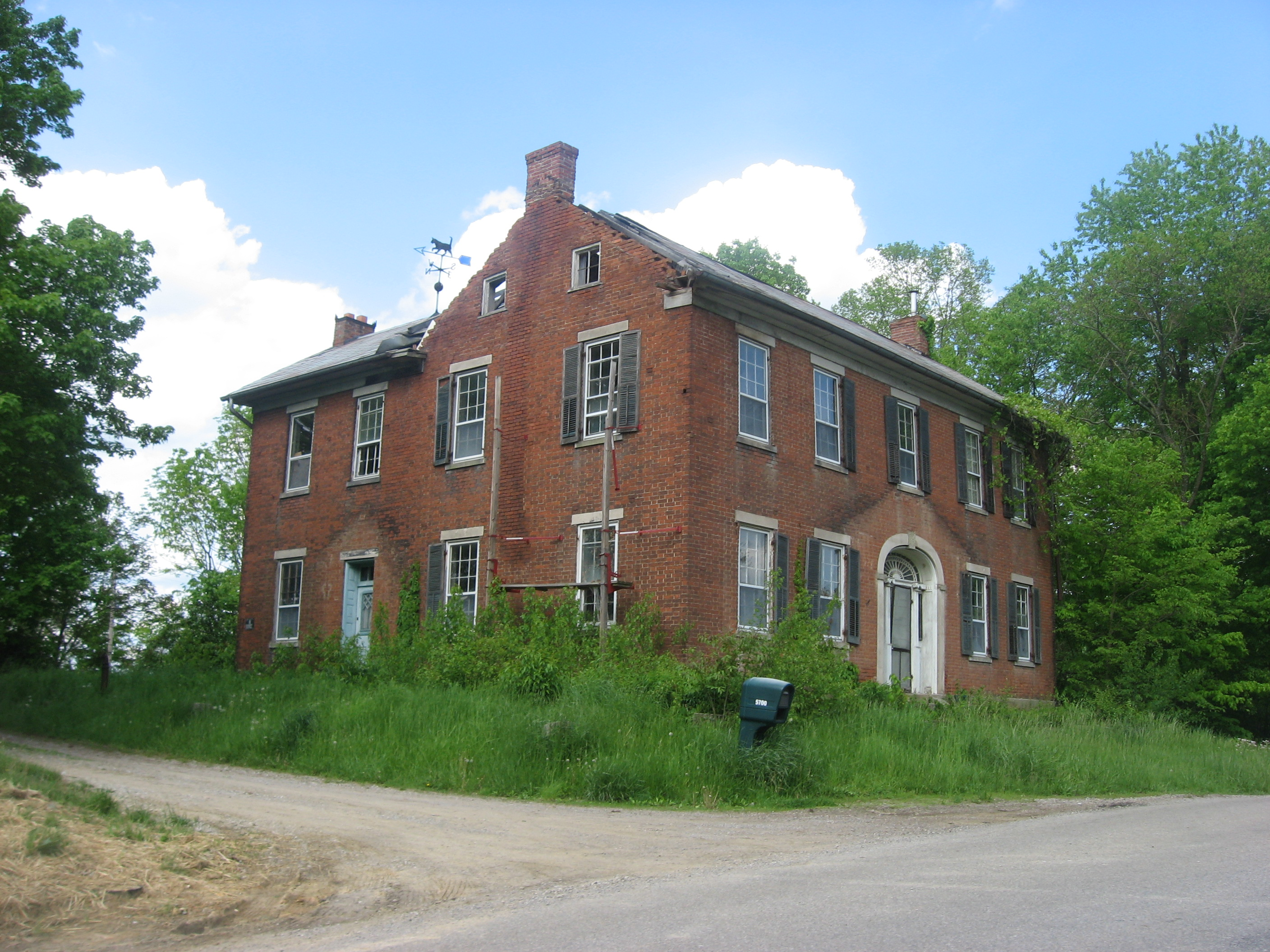
- The Randolph Mitchell House in New Reading

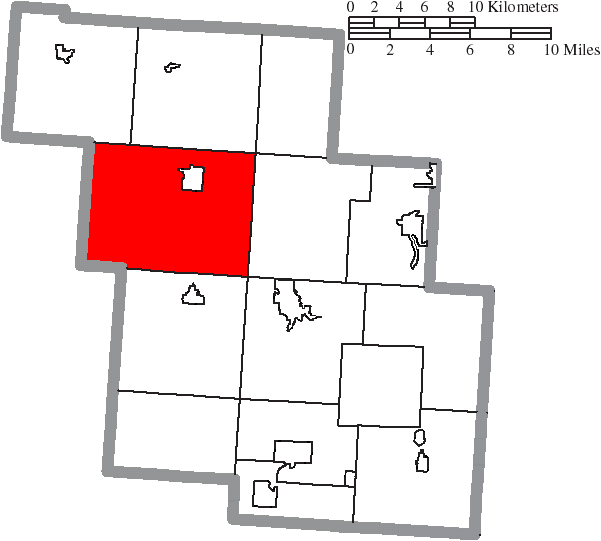
- Location of Reading Township in Perry County
- Coordinates: 39°47′7″N 82°19′8″W
- Country: United States
- State: Ohio
- County: Perry

Area
  - Total: 50.7 sq mi (131.3 km^{2})
  - Land: 50.4 sq mi (130.5 km^{2})
  - Water: 0.35 sq mi (0.9 km^{2})
- Elevation: 1,079 ft (329 m)

Population (2020)
  - Total: 4,358
  - Density: 87/sq mi (33.4/km^{2})
- Time zone: UTC-5 (Eastern (EST))
  - Summer (DST): UTC-4 (EDT)
- FIPS code: 39-65760
- GNIS feature ID: 1086789
- Website: https://www.readingtownshipohio.com/

Reading Township is one of the fourteen townships of Perry County, Ohio, United States. The 2020 census found 4,358 people in the township.

== Geography ==
Located in the western part of the county, it borders the following townships:

- Hopewell Township - north
- Madison Township - northeast corner
- Clayton Township - east
- Pike Township - southeast corner
- Jackson Township - south
- Rush Creek Township, Fairfield County - southwest
- Richland Township, Fairfield County - west
- Thorn Township - northwest

The village of Somerset is located in northern Reading Township.

== Name and history ==
Reading Township was established around 1805, and named after Reading, Pennsylvania. It is the only Reading Township statewide.

== Government ==
The township is governed by a three-member board of trustees, who are elected in November of odd-numbered years to a four-year term beginning on the following January 1. Two are elected in the year after the presidential election and one is elected in the year before it. There is also an elected township fiscal officer, who serves a four-year term beginning on April 1 of the year after the election, which is held in November of the year before the presidential election. Vacancies in the fiscal officership or on the board of trustees are filled by the remaining trustees.
