= York Township, Morgan County, Ohio =

Township in Ohio, US

- Township
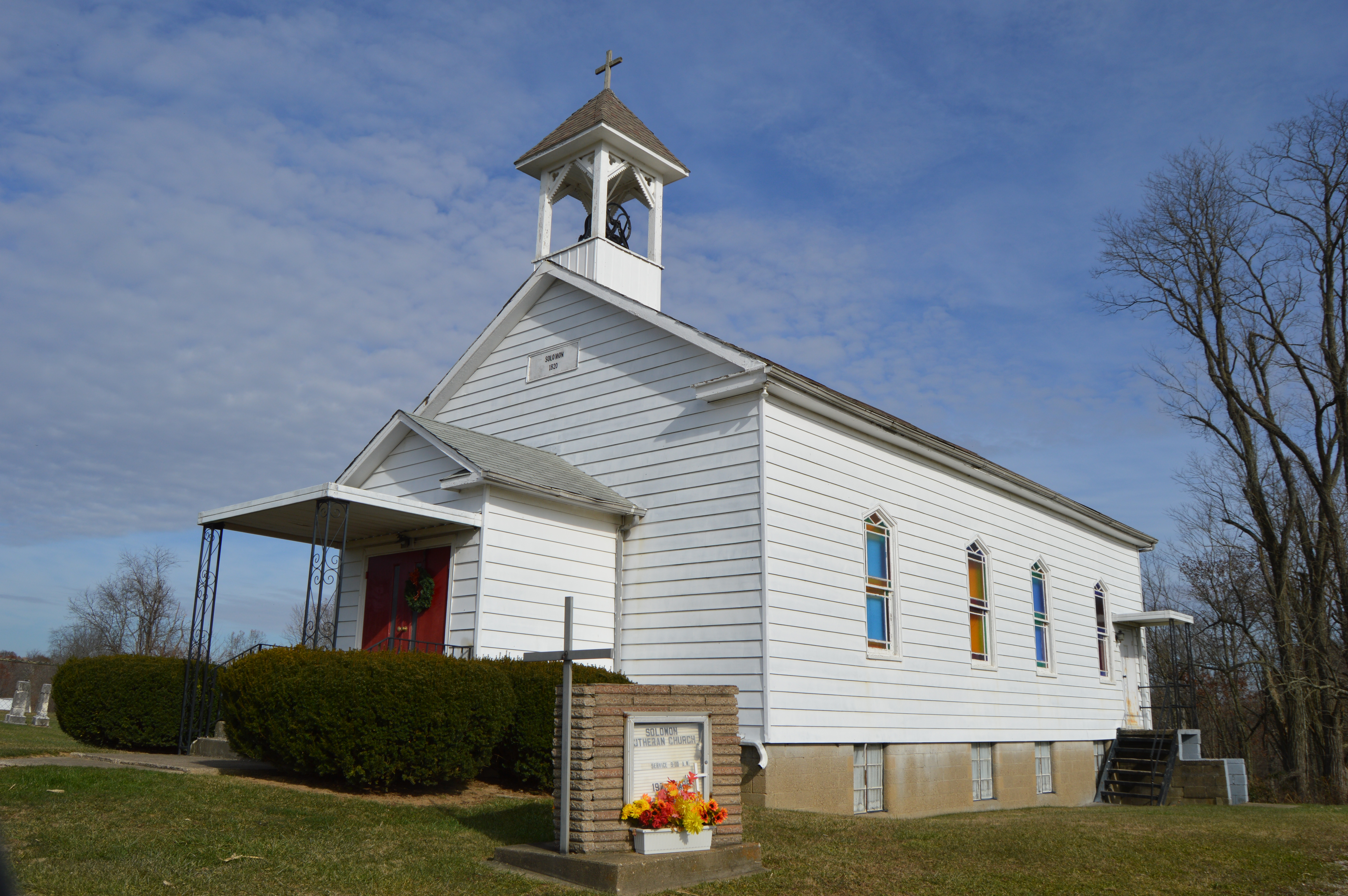
- Solomon Lutheran Church on State Route 669

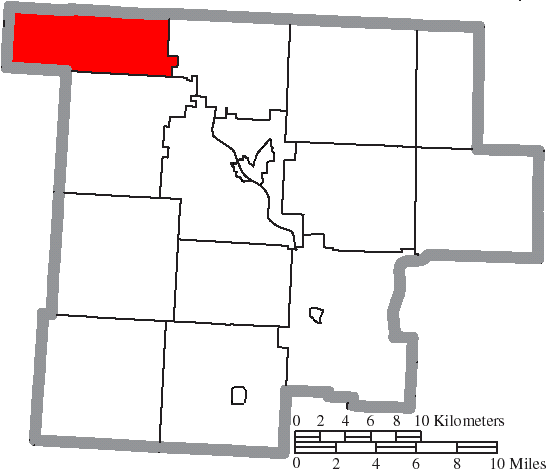
- Location of York Township in Morgan County
- Coordinates: 39°44′54″N 82°1′56″W
- Country: United States
- State: Ohio
- County: Morgan

Area
  - Total: 24.6 sq mi (63.6 km^{2})
  - Land: 24.5 sq mi (63.5 km^{2})
  - Water: 0.039 sq mi (0.1 km^{2})
- Elevation: 909 ft (277 m)

Population (2020)
  - Total: 753
  - Density: 30.7/sq mi (11.9/km^{2})
- Time zone: UTC-5 (Eastern (EST))
  - Summer (DST): UTC-4 (EDT)
- FIPS code: 39-87066
- GNIS feature ID: 1086696

York Township is one of the fourteen townships of Morgan County, Ohio, United States. The 2020 census found 753 people in the township. Main roads that go through the township are Ohio State Route 669, and Ohio State Route 555.

== Geography ==
Located in the northwestern corner of the county, it borders the following townships:

- Clay Township, Muskingum County - north, west of Brush Creek Township
- Brush Creek Township, Muskingum County - north, east of Clay Township
- Harrison Township, Muskingum County - northeast
- Bloom Township - east
- Deerfield Township - south
- Bearfield Township, Perry County - southwest
- Harrison Township, Perry County - west

It is the most westerly township in Morgan County.

The census-designated place of Rose Farm lies in the township's southwest. Deavertown is located in the west of the township.

== Name and history ==
It is one of ten York Townships statewide.

== Government ==
The township is governed by a three-member board of trustees, who are elected in November of odd-numbered years to a four-year term beginning on the following January 1. Two are elected in the year after the presidential election and one is elected in the year before it. There is also an elected township fiscal officer, who serves a four-year term beginning on April 1 of the year after the election, which is held in November of the year before the presidential election. Vacancies in the fiscal officership or on the board of trustees are filled by the remaining trustees.
