= White Cottage, Ohio =

Unincorporated community in Ohio, U.S.

Coordinates: 39°52′18″N 82°05′52″W

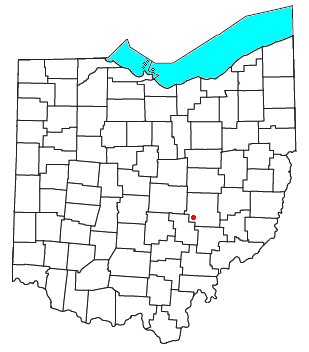
Location of White Cottage, Ohio

White Cottage is an unincorporated community in central Newton Township, Muskingum County, Ohio, United States. It has a post office with the ZIP code 43791. It lies along U.S. Route 22 between Zanesville and Lancaster.

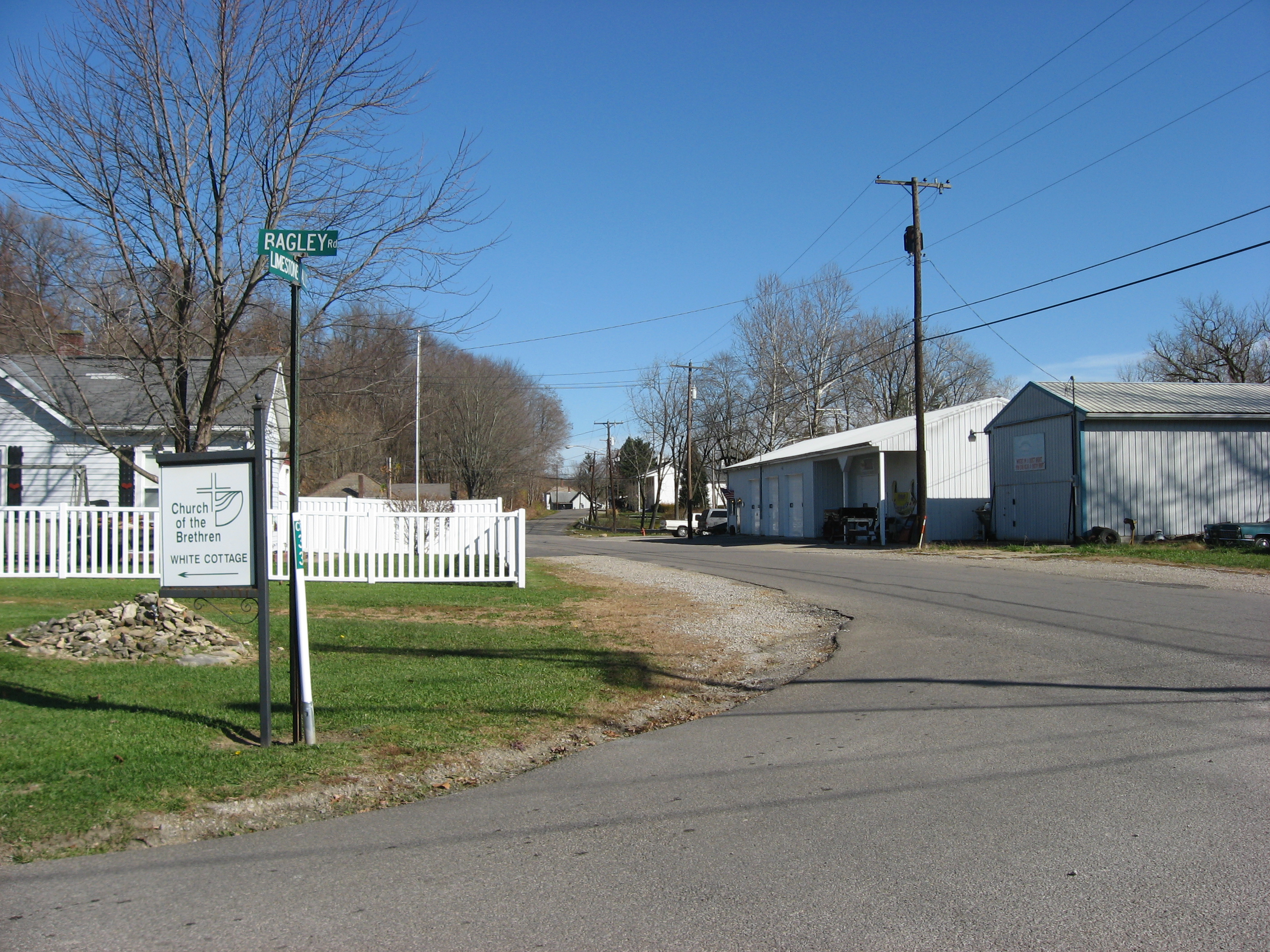
Streetside in White Cottage

A post office called White Cottage has been in operation since 1839. The community was named for a white tavern near the original town site.
