= Randolph Mitchell House =

- U.S. National Register of Historic Places
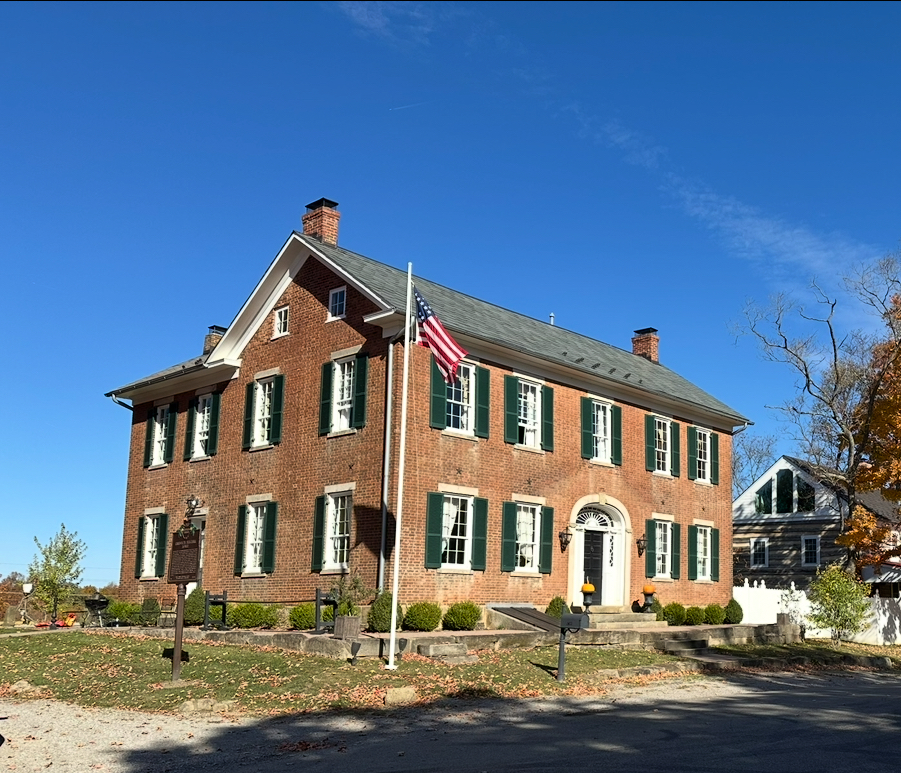
- Front and western side

- Location within Ohio Location within the United States
- Location: 5700 Rush Creek Rd., New Reading, Ohio
- Coordinates: 39°48′36″N 82°21′12″W
- Area: 1 acre (0.40 ha)
- Built: 1828
- Architectural style: Federal, Adam style
- NRHP reference No.: 78002170
- Added to NRHP: December 8, 1978

The Randolph Mitchell House is a historic house in the small community of New Reading, Ohio, United States. One of the most prominent old buildings in the area's oldest settlement, it was once the home of a leading local resident, and it has been named a historic site because of its distinctive Neoclassical-influenced architecture.

== History ==
Settled in 1801, the community of New Reading was platted in 1805, before any other community in Perry County; for much of its early history, it was better known as "Overmyertown" in honor of its founder, Peter Overmyer. When the county was established in 1817, New Reading contended for the title of county seat, and although it failed to obtain this distinction, it remained prosperous throughout the nineteenth century. Into this flourishing community moved Randolph Mitchell two years after the failed bid for county seat. Having paid the then-huge sum of $100 to buy seven lots in the village, he commenced the construction of a grand house, which was finished in 1828. Before long, Mitchell had gained high standing in the community; he was a prominent member of the village's Methodist church, and later generations remembered him as one of the leading merchants of old New Reading.

== Architecture ==
Mitchell's house is a brick building with a foundation of sandstone, a slate roof, and miscellaneous elements of sandstone and other types of stone. Built with a floor plan in the shape of the letter "L", the house is entered primarily through a grand entrance in the center of its five-bay facade. This entrance is the exterior's most prominent component, due to its trabeated entrance with an archway, its eight-panelled surrounding windows and fanlight, and its Ionic columns on both sides of the doorway. Inside, the house is divided into rooms surrounding a single hallway, and the rooms feature neoclassical detailing. The plan and details of the house's interior and entrance combine to make it typical of the Adam style, while the exterior is clearly Federal in style.

== Preservation ==
The Randolph Mitchell House occupies a prominent place in the extant early architecture of Perry County. Few period residences in the area can compare with its Federal and Adam styling, and few have experienced so few changes by the hand of man. In December 1978, the Mitchell House was listed on the National Register of Historic Places, qualifying both because of its distinctive architecture and because of its place as the home of a prominent citizen. It is one of four National Register-listed properties in Reading Township, along with St. Joseph's Catholic Church near Somerset, the home of General Philip Sheridan's family in Somerset, and Somerset's public square.
