= Ohio State Route 345 =

State highway in eastern Ohio, US

State Route 345

Route information
- Maintained by ODOT
- Length: 11.74 mi (18.89 km)
- Existed: 1935–present

Major junctions
- South end: SR 13 / SR 37 in New Lexington
- North end: US 22 in East Fultonham

Location
- Country: United States
- State: Ohio
- Counties: Perry, Muskingum

Highway system
- Ohio State Highway System; Interstate; US; State; Scenic
← SR 344	→ SR 346

State Route 345 (SR 345) is a north–south state highway in the eastern portion of the U.S. state of Ohio. The southern terminus of SR 345 is at a signalized intersection with the SR 13/SR 37 concurrency in New Lexington. Its northern terminus is at a T-intersection with U.S. Route 22 (US 22) in the unincorporated community of East Fultonham.

== Route description ==
SR 345 traverses the northeastern quadrant of Perry County and the southwestern corner of Muskingum County. This state route is not included as a component of the National Highway System (NHS). The NHS is a system of highways identified as most important for the economy, mobility and defense of the nation.

== History ==
The SR 345 designation was assigned in 1935. It was originally routed along its present alignment from its southern terminus in New Lexington to its northeastern junction with SR 669, and then along the current routing of SR 669 from that point southeasterly into Crooksville.

Two years later, SR 345 was re-routed from the point that currently marks its northeastern junction with SR 669 onto a new alignment along a previously un-numbered roadway to the point that marks its current northern terminus at US 22 in East Fultonham.

== Major intersections ==
County	Location	mi	km	Destinations	Notes
Perry	New Lexington	0.00	0.00	SR 13 / SR 37 (Main Street / Broadway) / Monument Street	
Perry	Clayton Township	6.65	10.70	SR 669 west – Somerset	Southern end of SR 669 concurrency
Perry	Clayton Township	7.28	11.72	SR 669 east – Crooksville	Northern end of SR 669 concurrency
Muskingum	Newton Township	11.74	18.89	US 22 – Somerset, Zanesville	
1.000 mi = 1.609 km; 1.000 km = 0.621 mi: Concurrency terminus
