= Thorn Township, Perry County, Ohio =

Township in Ohio, US

- Township
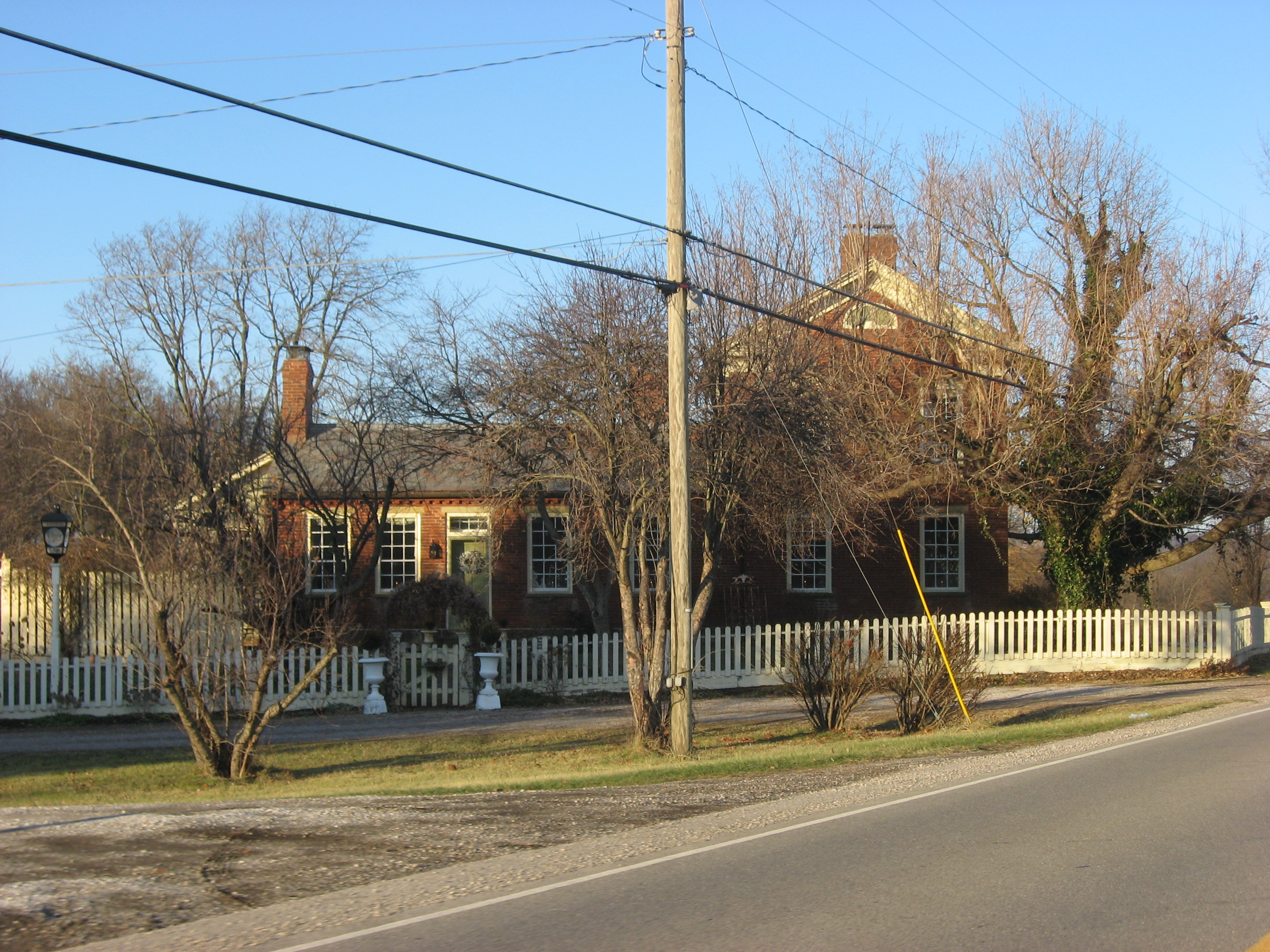
- The Soloman Whitmer House, a historic site on Zion Road

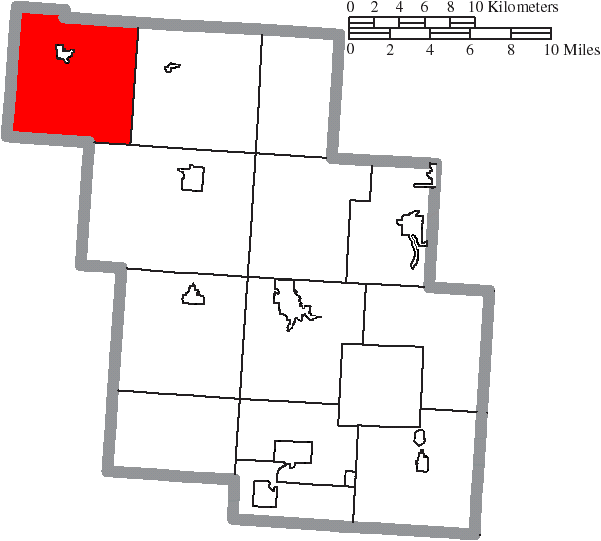
- Location of Thorn Township in Perry County
- Coordinates: 39°53′26″N 82°24′52″W
- Country: United States
- State: Ohio
- County: Perry

Area
  - Total: 38.0 sq mi (98.5 km^{2})
  - Land: 37.3 sq mi (96.5 km^{2})
  - Water: 0.77 sq mi (2.0 km^{2})
- Elevation: 1,020 ft (310 m)

Population (2020)
  - Total: 4,555
  - Density: 122/sq mi (47.2/km^{2})
- Time zone: UTC-5 (Eastern (EST))
  - Summer (DST): UTC-4 (EDT)
- FIPS code: 39-76659
- GNIS feature ID: 1086791
- Website: https://thorntownship.com/

Thorn Township is one of the fourteen townships of Perry County, Ohio, United States. The 2020 census found 4,555 people in the township.

== Geography ==
Located in the northwestern corner of the county, it borders the following townships:

- Licking Township, Licking County - north
- Bowling Green Township, Licking County - northeast
- Hopewell Township - east
- Reading Township - southeast
- Richland Township, Fairfield County - south
- Walnut Township, Fairfield County - west
- Union Township, Licking County - northwest corner

The village of Thornville is located in northeastern Thorn Township.

== Name and history ==
Thorn Township was organized around 1804, and was so named on account of there being many thorny plants within its borders. It is the only Thorn Township statewide.

Thorn Township borders Buckeye Lake, formerly known as the Licking Summit Reservoir. The unincorporated village of Thornport was platted in 1839 by W. W. Talbott, whose canal improvement company dug a private canal to connect Thorn Township and its farmers to the Licking Summit Reservoir and the canal trade, bringing some prosperity to the township. After a storm, the village fell into ruin, until a nearby railroad reestablished grain networks. Today, the northern edge of Thorn Township is composed of lake-side homes, many of which are owned by prosperous residents of nearby cities, such as Zanesville, Newark and Columbus.

== Government ==
The township is governed by a three-member board of trustees, who are elected in November of odd-numbered years to a four-year term beginning on the following January 1. Two are elected in the year after the presidential election and one is elected in the year before it. There is also an elected township fiscal officer, who serves a four-year term beginning on April 1 of the year after the election, which is held in November of the year before the presidential election. Vacancies in the fiscal officership or on the board of trustees are filled by the remaining trustees.
