= Ringgold, Ohio =

- Unincorporated community
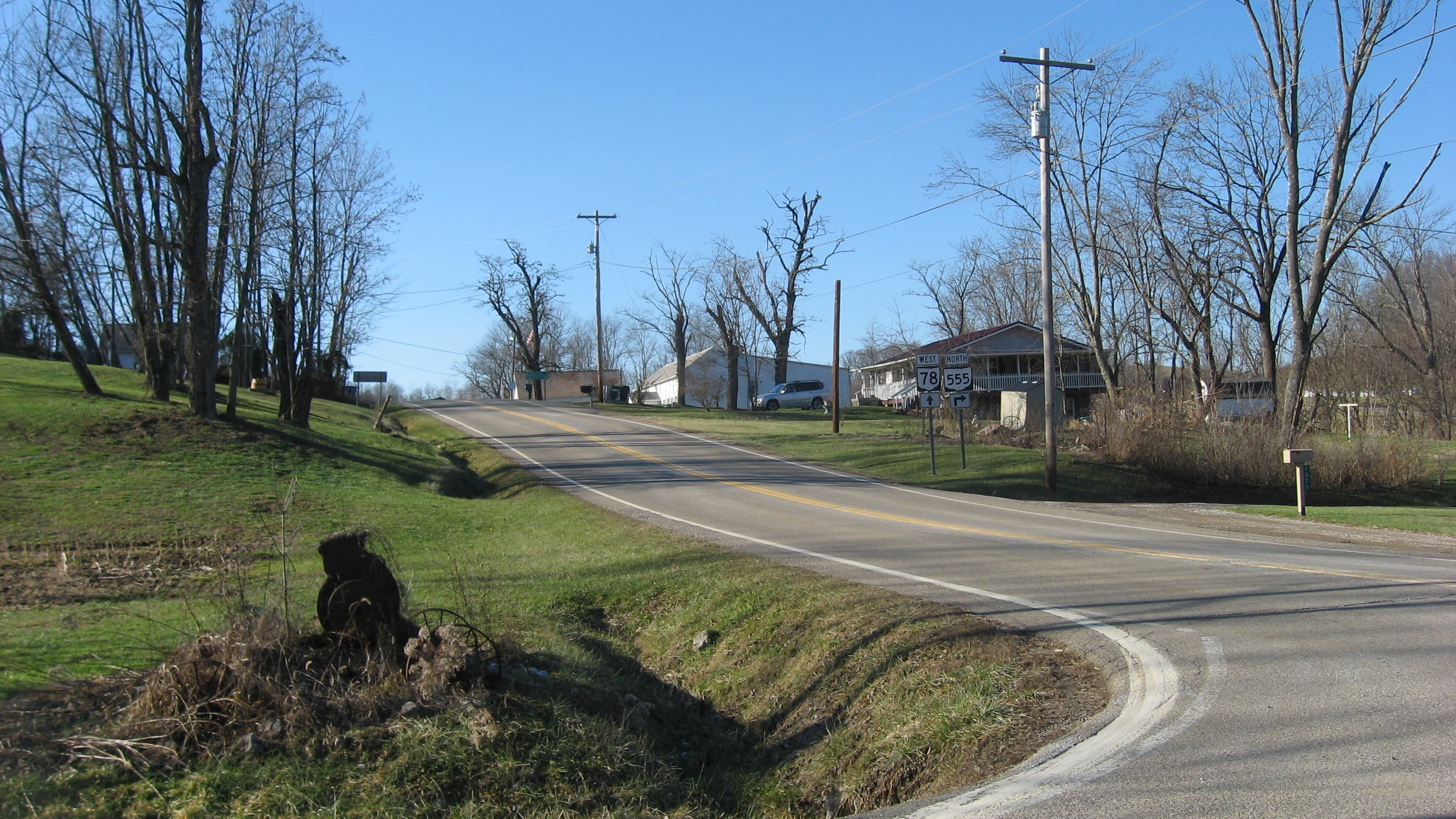
- State Route 78 in the community's east side

- Location within Ohio Location within the United States
- Coordinates: 39°35′25″N 81°58′47″W
- Country: United States
- State: Ohio
- County: Morgan
- Township: Union
- Elevation: 932 ft (284 m)
- Time zone: UTC-5 (Eastern (EST))
  - Summer (DST): UTC-4 (EDT)
- ZIP Code: 43758 (Malta)
- Area code: 740
- GNIS feature ID: 1076743

Ringgold is an unincorporated community in Morgan County, Ohio, United States. Ringgold is located at the junction of State Routes 78 and 555, 7.5 miles (12.1 km) southwest of Malta.

== History ==
Ringgold was platted in 1846, and named for Samuel Ringgold, a United States Army officer. A post office was established at Ringgold in 1847, and remained in operation until 1939.
