= Ohio State Route 669 =

East-west state highway in Ohio, US

State Route 669

Route information
- Maintained by ODOT
- Length: 32.68 mi (52.59 km)
- Existed: 1937–present

Major junctions
- West end: SR 13 near Somerset
- East end: SR 37 / SR 78 in Malta

Location
- Country: United States
- State: Ohio
- Counties: Perry, Morgan

Highway system
- Ohio State Highway System; Interstate; US; State; Scenic
← SR 668	→ I-670

State Route 669 (SR 669) is an east–west state highway in Perry and Morgan Counties in the US state of Ohio. The western terminus of SR 669 is at an intersection with SR 13, southeast of Somerset. The eastern terminus of SR 669 at an intersection with SR 37 and SR 78. Most of the route is a rural two-lane highway and passes through woodland, farmland, and residential properties. For some of its path, SR 669 runs generally parallel to the west of Muskingum River. SR 669 was commissioned in 1937, along a similar route to today. The highway was extended to its current western terminus in 1938. The entire route was paved by the mid-1950s.

== Route description ==
SR 669 begins at a T-intersection with SR 13, southeast of Somerset. The highway heads towards the east passing through farmland and woodland, as a two-lane highway. The highway has a T-intersection with SR 345, SR 669 heads northeast concurrent with SR 345. The road passes through residential area, before SR 669 leaves SR 345. SR 669 heads towards the southeast passes through woodland, as a two-lane highway. The route enters Crooksville, passing through residential properties. The highway has an intersection with SR 93, SR 669 turns south concurrent with SR 93. The concurrency head towards south-southeast, as a four-lane divided highway, before becoming a two-lane highway. The highway passes through woodland and crosses over a railroad track.

The concurrency ends at an intersection with SR 669 turning towards the east and SR 93 continuing towards the south. The highway heads east through woodland, with some farmland and houses. SR 669 begins a concurrency with SR 555, heading towards the north-northeast. The concurrency ends with SR 669 heading towards the east and SR 555 continuing towards the north. SR 669 heads east-southeast through woodland as a two-lane highway. The highway makes a sharp turn on the banks of the Muskingum River. The road parallels the river on the west banks of the river, until the road enter Malta. In Malta the highway makes a sharp curve towards the southwest, followed by a curve towards the southeast. The road continues towards the southeast, passing through residential properties in Malta. SR 669 ends at an intersection with SR 37 and SR 78.

== History ==
SR 669 was commissioned in 1937, on the same route as today between Crooksville and Malta. In 1938 the route was extended west to its current western terminus, replacing SR 663. The first section of route paved was between Crooksville and Deavertown, which was paved in 1942. The final section was paved between 1957 and 1959, this section was between SR 555 and Eagleport.

== Major intersections ==
County	Location	mi	km	Destinations	Notes
Perry	Reading Township	0.00	0.00	SR 13	Western terminus of SR 669
Perry	Clayton Township	6.34	10.20	SR 345 south	Southern end of SR 345 concurrency
Perry	Clayton Township	6.97	11.22	SR 345 north	Northern end of SR 345 concurrency
Perry	Crooksville	10.15	16.33	SR 93 north	Northern end of SR 93 concurrency
Perry	Crooksville	12.41	19.97	SR 93 south	Southern end of SR 93 concurrency
Morgan	York Township	15.90	25.59	SR 555 south	Southern end of SR 555 concurrency
Morgan	York Township	18.87	30.37	SR 555 north	Northern end of SR 555 concurrency
Morgan	Malta	32.68	52.59	SR 37 / SR 78	Eastern terminus of SR 669
1.000 mi = 1.609 km; 1.000 km = 0.621 mi: Concurrency terminus
