= Hopewell Township, Perry County, Ohio =

Township in Ohio, US

- Township
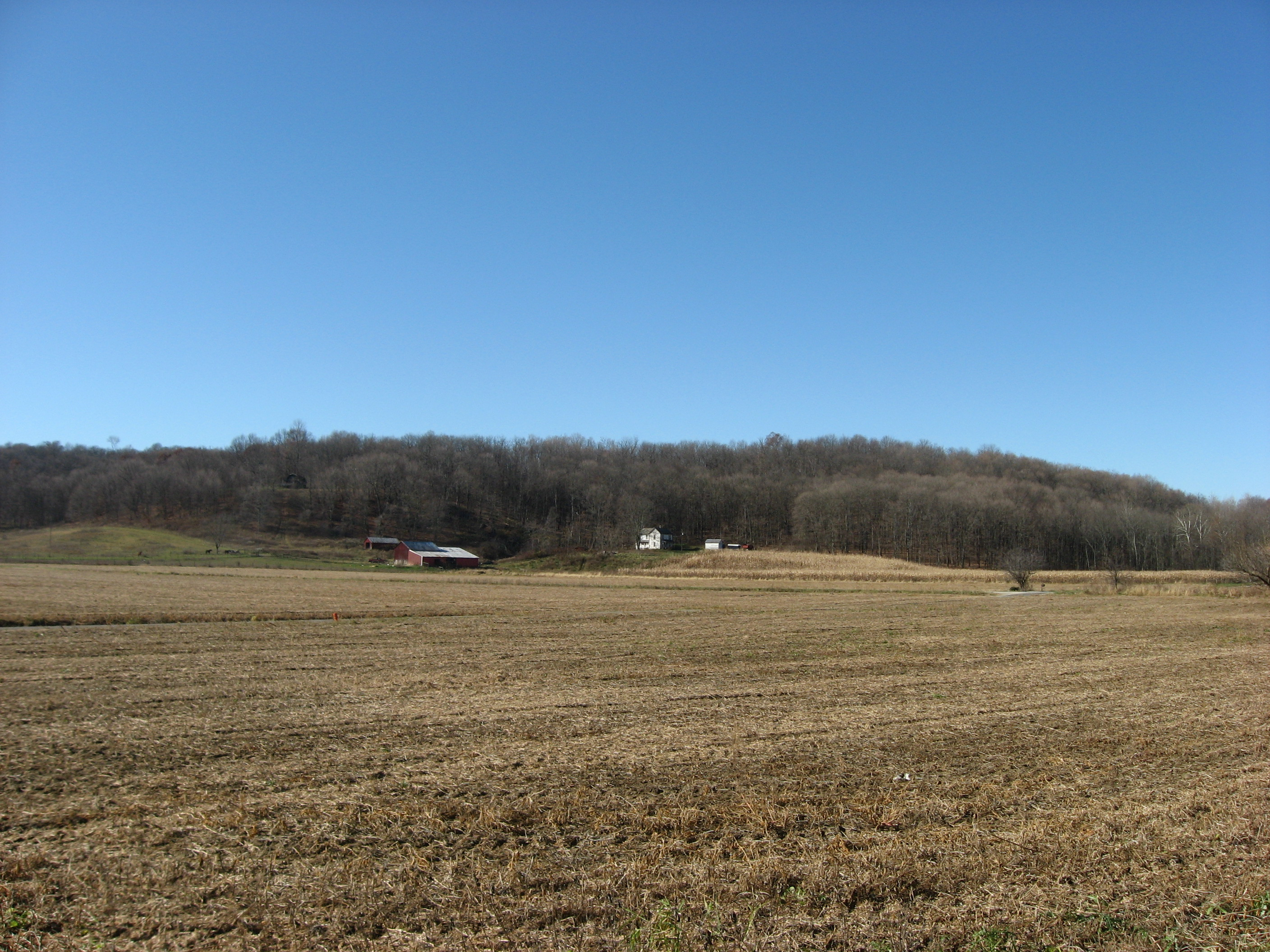
- Countryside in Hopewell Township

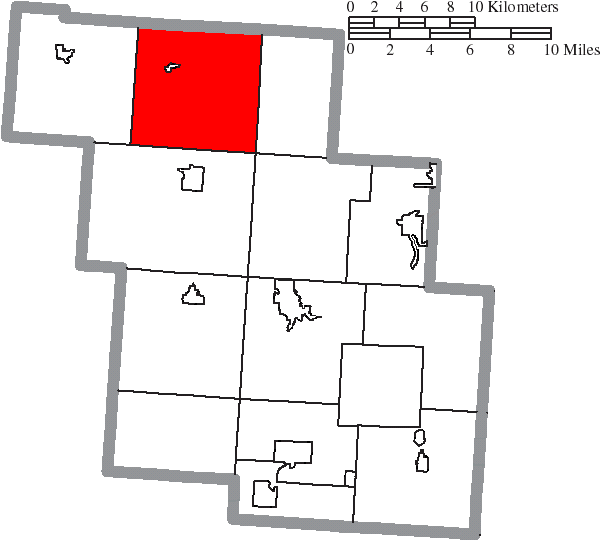
- Location of Hopewell Township in Perry County
- Coordinates: 39°52′37″N 82°17′38″W
- Country: United States
- State: Ohio
- County: Perry

Area
  - Total: 37.7 sq mi (97.6 km^{2})
  - Land: 37.6 sq mi (97.5 km^{2})
  - Water: 0.039 sq mi (0.1 km^{2})
- Elevation: 965 ft (294 m)

Population (2020)
  - Total: 2,583
  - Density: 69/sq mi (26.5/km^{2})
- Time zone: UTC-5 (Eastern (EST))
  - Summer (DST): UTC-4 (EDT)
- FIPS code: 39-36386
- GNIS feature ID: 1086782
- Website: https://hopewelltownship.net/

Hopewell Township is one of the fourteen townships of Perry County, Ohio, United States. The 2020 census found 2,583 people in the township.

== Geography ==
Located in the northern part of the county, it borders the following townships:

- Bowling Green Township, Licking County - north
- Hopewell Township, Muskingum County - northeast corner
- Madison Township - east
- Clayton Township - southeast corner
- Reading Township - south
- Thorn Township - west

The village of Glenford is located in northwestern Hopewell Township.

== Name and history ==
Hopewell Township was organized around 1810. It is one of five Hopewell Townships statewide.

== Government ==
The township is governed by a three-member board of trustees, who are elected in November of odd-numbered years to a four-year term beginning on the following January 1. Two are elected in the year after the presidential election and one is elected in the year before it. There is also an elected township fiscal officer, who serves a four-year term beginning on April 1 of the year after the election, which is held in November of the year before the presidential election. Vacancies in the fiscal officership or on the board of trustees are filled by the remaining trustees.
