= Harrison Township, Perry County, Ohio =

Township in Ohio, US

- Township
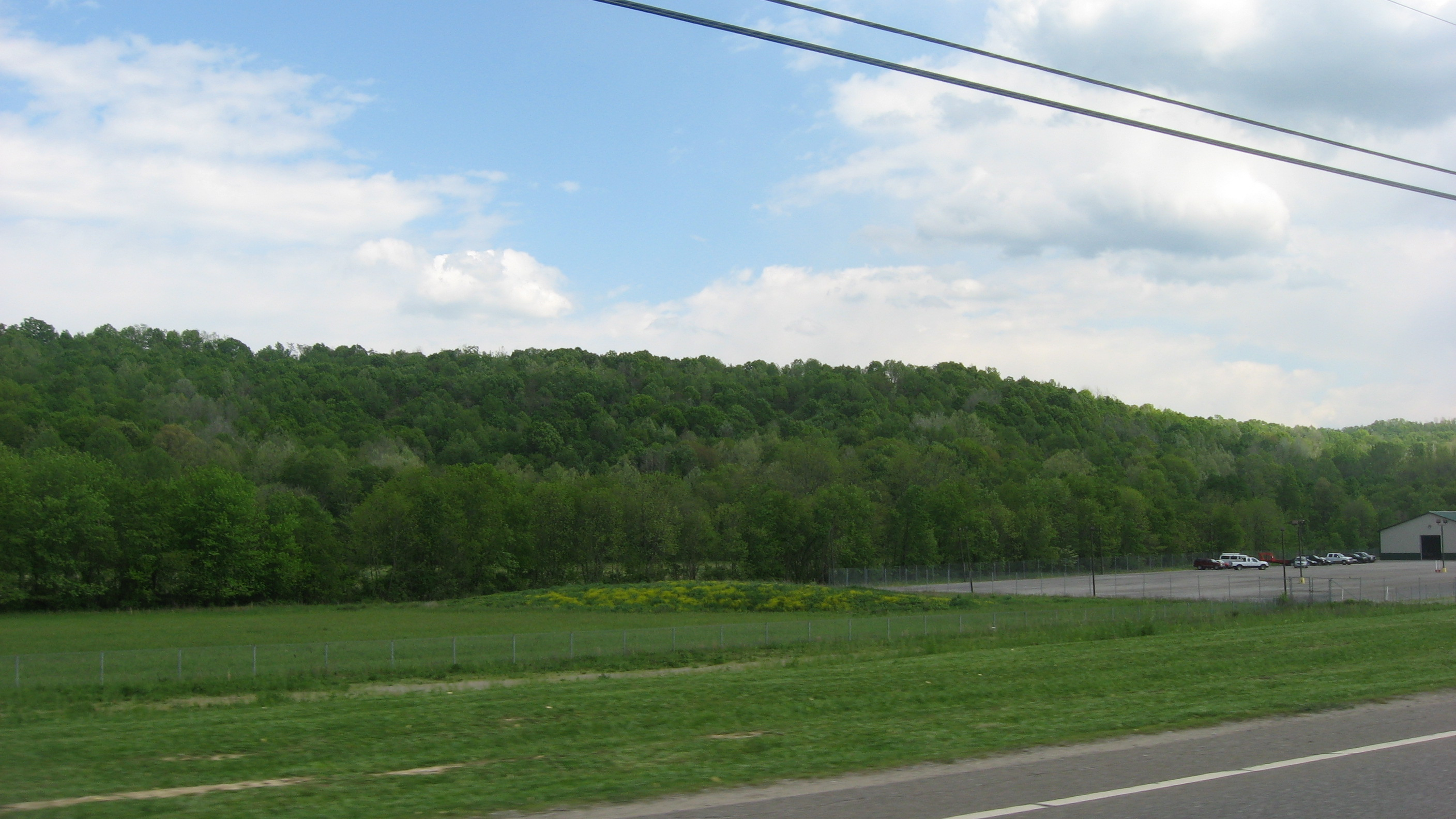
- Hills south of Crooksville

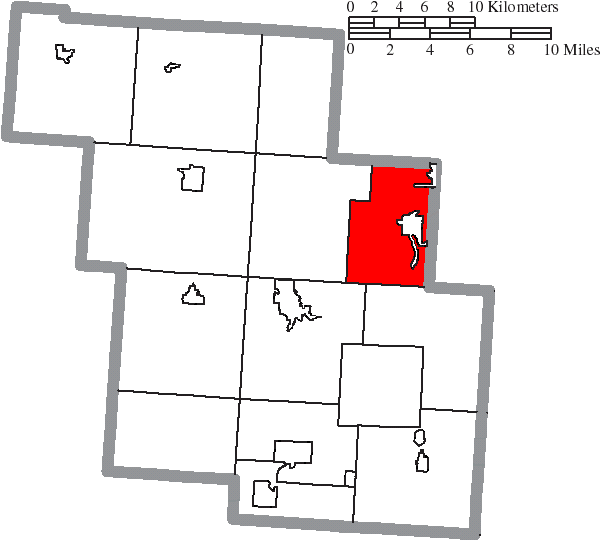
- Location of Harrison Township in Perry County
- Coordinates: 39°46′36″N 82°5′51″W
- Country: United States
- State: Ohio
- County: Perry

Area
  - Total: 23.3 sq mi (60.3 km^{2})
  - Land: 23.2 sq mi (60.2 km^{2})
  - Water: 0.077 sq mi (0.2 km^{2})
- Elevation: 778 ft (237 m)

Population (2020)
  - Total: 5,145
  - Density: 221/sq mi (85.5/km^{2})
- Time zone: UTC-5 (Eastern (EST))
  - Summer (DST): UTC-4 (EDT)
- ZIP Codes: 43731 E & SE; 43764 W & SW; 43777 NE & NW
- Area code: 740
- FIPS code: 39-33964
- GNIS feature ID: 1086781

Harrison Township is one of the fourteen townships of Perry County, Ohio, United States. The 2020 census found 5,145 people in the township.

== Geography ==
Located in the northeastern part of the county, it borders the following townships:

- Newton Township, Muskingum County - north
- Clay Township, Muskingum County - northeast
- York Township, Morgan County - southeast
- Bearfield Township - south
- Pike Township - southwest
- Clayton Township - west

Several populated places are located in Harrison Township:

- The village of Crooksville, in the east
- Part of the village of Roseville, in the far northeast along the border with Muskingum County
- Part of the census-designated place of Rose Farm, in the southeast along the border with Morgan County
- The unincorporated community of McLuney, also in the south

== Name and history ==
Harrison Township was organized in 1820, and named for William Henry Harrison, an Ohio legislator and afterward 5th President of the United States. It is one of nineteen Harrison Townships statewide.

== Government ==
The township is governed by a three-member board of trustees, who are elected in November of odd-numbered years to a four-year term beginning on the following January 1. Two are elected in the year after the presidential election and one is elected in the year before it. There is also an elected township fiscal officer, who serves a four-year term beginning on April 1 of the year after the election, which is held in November of the year before the presidential election. Vacancies in the fiscal officership or on the board of trustees are filled by the remaining trustees.
