= Clay Township, Ohio =

Clay Township, Ohio, may refer to:

- Clay Township, Auglaize County, Ohio
- Clay Township, Gallia County, Ohio
- Clay Township, Highland County, Ohio
- Clay Township, Knox County, Ohio
- Clay Township, Montgomery County, Ohio
- Clay Township, Muskingum County, Ohio
- Clay Township, Ottawa County, Ohio
- Clay Township, Scioto County, Ohio
- Clay Township, Tuscarawas County, Ohio
