= Pike Township =

Pike Township may refer to:

== Illinois ==
- Pike Township, Livingston County, Illinois

== Indiana ==
- Pike Township, Jay County, Indiana
- Pike Township, Marion County, Indiana
- Pike Township, Ohio County, Indiana
- Pike Township, Warren County, Indiana

== Iowa ==
- Pike Township, Muscatine County, Iowa

== Kansas ==
- Pike Township, Lyon County, Kansas

== Minnesota ==
- Pike Township, St. Louis County, Minnesota

== Missouri ==
- Pike Township, Carter County, Missouri
- Pike Township, Stoddard County, Missouri

== Ohio ==
- Pike Township, Brown County, Ohio
- Pike Township, Clark County, Ohio
- Pike Township, Coshocton County, Ohio
- Pike Township, Fulton County, Ohio
- Pike Township, Knox County, Ohio
- Pike Township, Madison County, Ohio
- Pike Township, Perry County, Ohio
- Pike Township, Stark County, Ohio

== Pennsylvania ==
- Pike Township, Berks County, Pennsylvania
- Pike Township, Bradford County, Pennsylvania
- Pike Township, Clearfield County, Pennsylvania
- Pike Township, Potter County, Pennsylvania
