= New Reading, Ohio =

- Unincorporated community
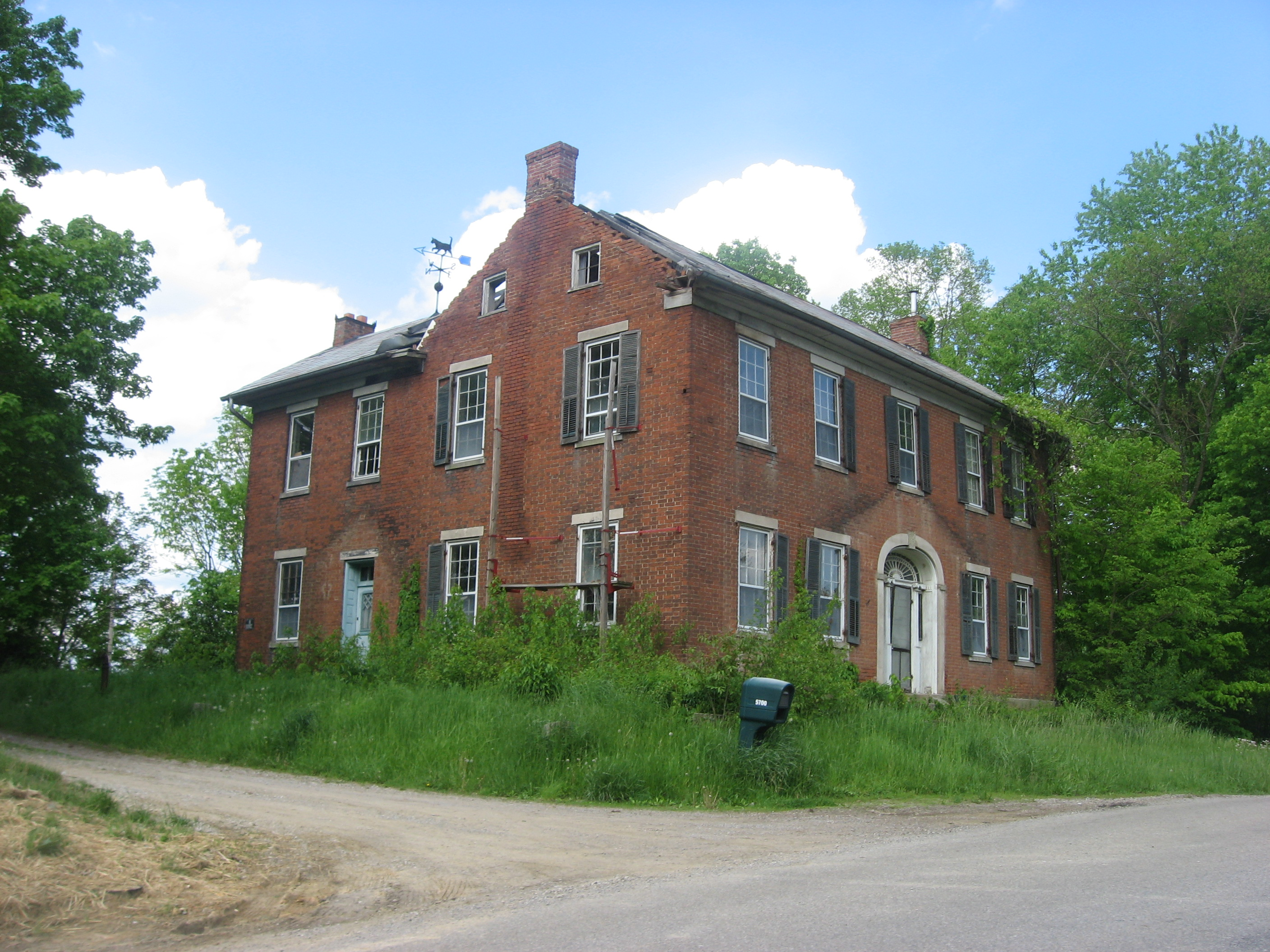
- The Randolph Mitchell House

- Location within Ohio Location within the United States
- Coordinates: 39°48′33″N 82°21′00″W
- Country: United States
- State: Ohio
- County: Perry
- Elevation: 1,073 ft (327 m)
- Time zone: UTC-5 (Eastern (EST))
  - Summer (DST): UTC-4 (EDT)
- Area code: 740
- GNIS feature ID: 1065133

New Reading is an unincorporated community in Perry County, Ohio, United States. New Reading is 2.8 miles (4.5 km) west of Somerset. Peter Overmire issued "articles of an agreement" with New Reading lot purchasers on April 19, 1805, within the west half of Section 7, Township 16, Range 16 (Fairfield County Deed Book E, deed #81, January 31, 1806). The United States issued a land patent to Peter Overmire for the west half of Section 7, Township 16, Range 16 on September 10, 1807 (www.glorecords.blm.gov, Accession Nr. CV-0005-203). The Randolph Mitchell House, which is listed on the National Register of Historic Places, is located in New Reading.
