= Newton Township, Muskingum County, Ohio =

Township in Ohio, US

- Township
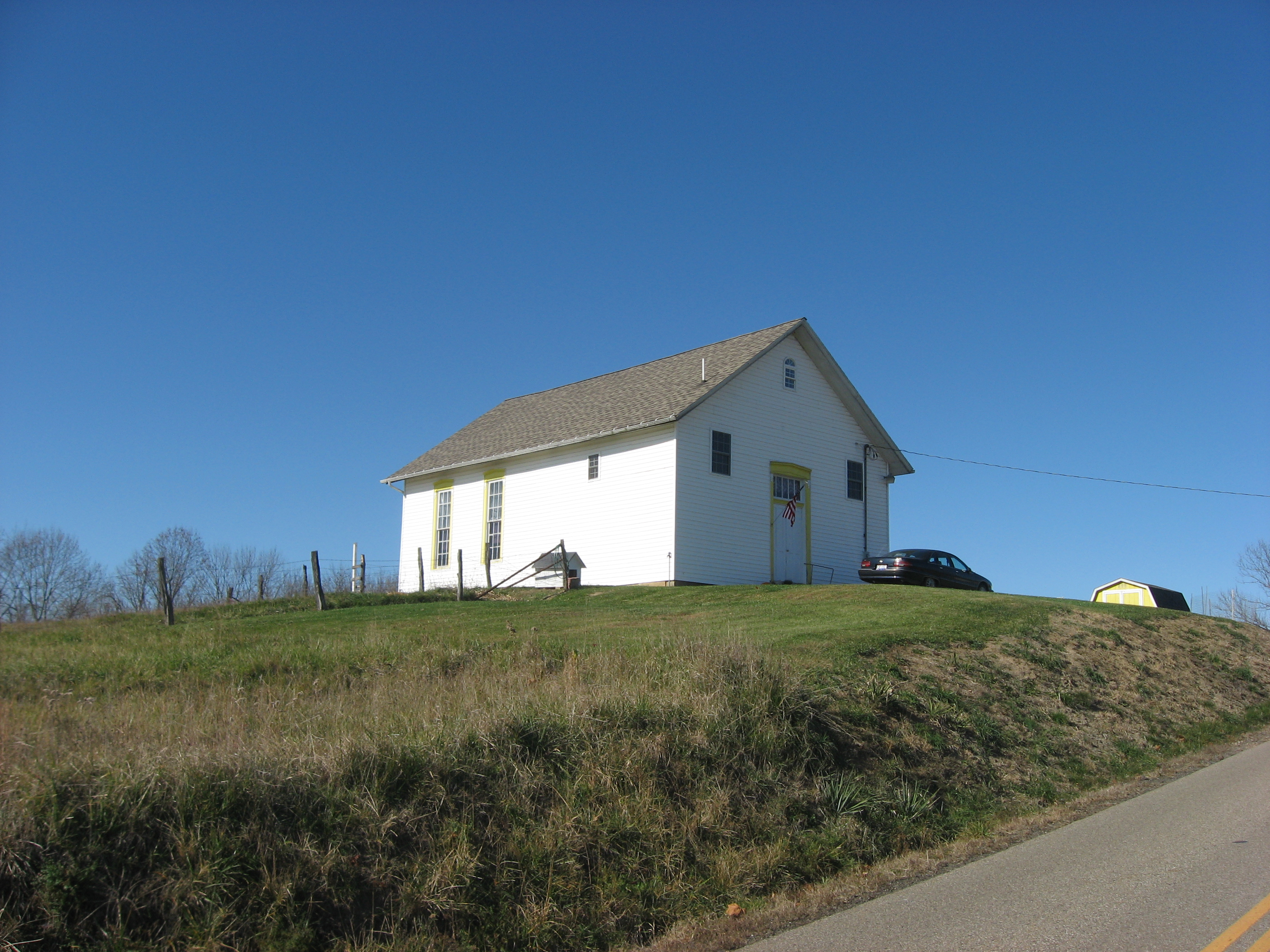
- Former church, now a house, in northern Newton Township

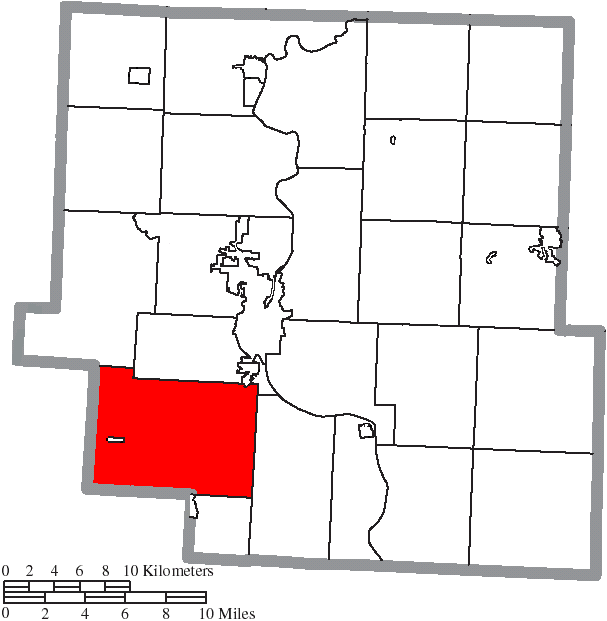
- Location of Newton Township in Muskingum County
- Coordinates: 39°51′39″N 82°5′8″W
- Country: United States
- State: Ohio
- County: Muskingum

Area
  - Total: 46.7 sq mi (120.9 km^{2})
  - Land: 46.3 sq mi (119.9 km^{2})
  - Water: 0.42 sq mi (1.1 km^{2})
- Elevation: 738 ft (225 m)

Population (2020)
  - Total: 5,247
  - Density: 113.3/sq mi (43.76/km^{2})
- Time zone: UTC-5 (Eastern (EST))
  - Summer (DST): UTC-4 (EDT)
- FIPS code: 39-55608
- GNIS feature ID: 1086729
- Website: https://www.newtontownship.org/

Newton Township is one of the twenty-five townships of Muskingum County, Ohio, United States. The 2020 census found 5,247 people in the township.

== Geography ==
Located on the western edge of the county, it borders the following townships:

- Springfield Township - north
- Brush Creek Township - east
- Clay Township - southeast
- Harrison Township, Perry County - south
- Clayton Township, Perry County - southwest
- Madison Township, Perry County - west
- Hopewell Township - northwest

The village of Fultonham is located in western Newton Township, and the unincorporated communities of East Fultonham and White Cottage are both located near the center of the township. East Fultonham lies farther southwest than White Cottage.

== Name and history ==
It is one of five Newton Townships statewide.

In 1833, Newton Township contained three churches, two or three salt works, seven saw mills, six flouring mills, and one physician.

== Government ==
The township is governed by a three-member board of trustees, who are elected in November of odd-numbered years to a four-year term beginning on the following January 1. Two are elected in the year after the presidential election and one is elected in the year before it. There is also an elected township fiscal officer, who serves a four-year term beginning on April 1 of the year after the election, which is held in November of the year before the presidential election. Vacancies in the fiscal officership or on the board of trustees are filled by the remaining trustees.
