= Springfield Township, Muskingum County, Ohio =

Township in Ohio, US

- Township
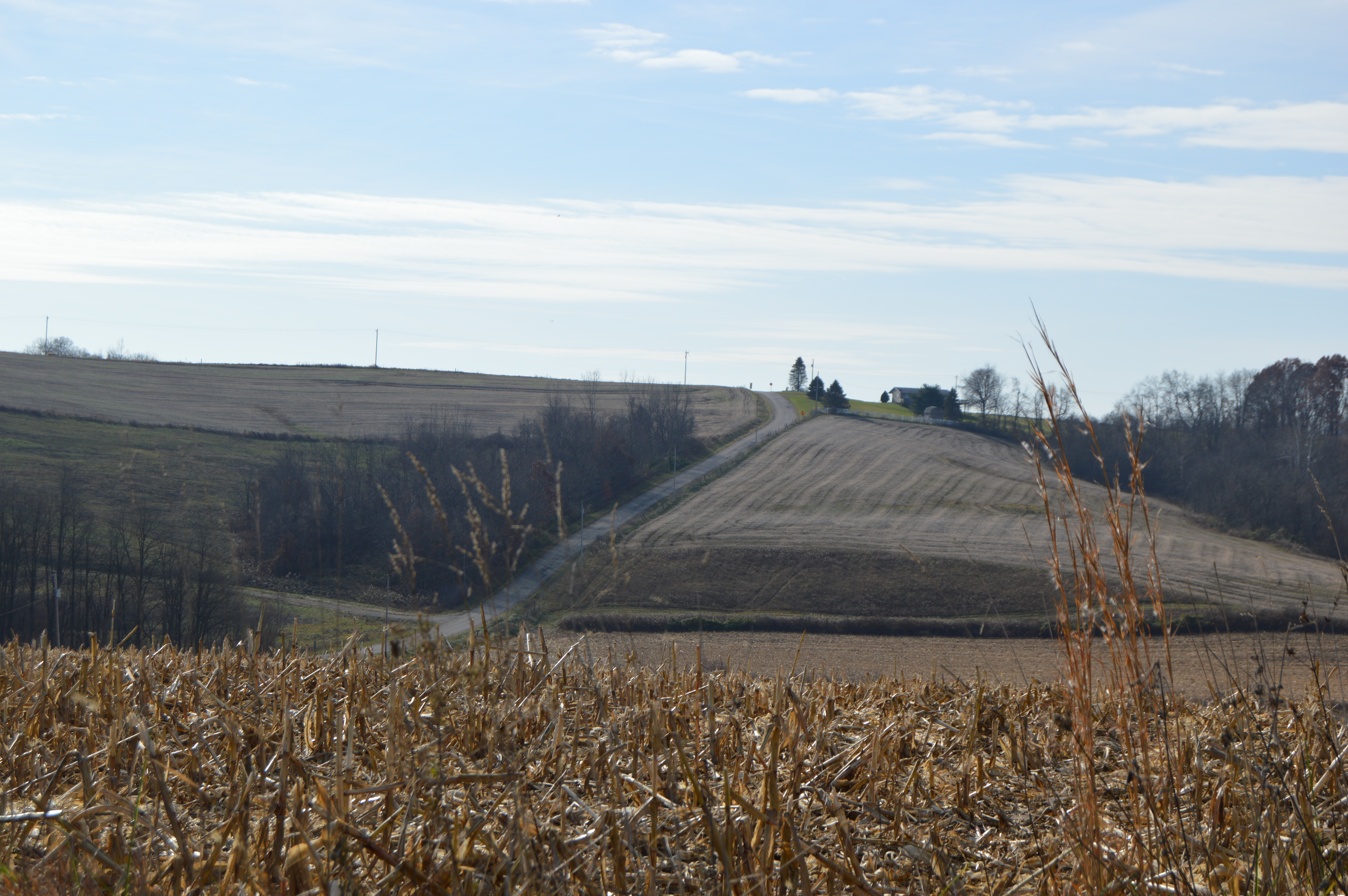
- Fields in far western Springfield Township

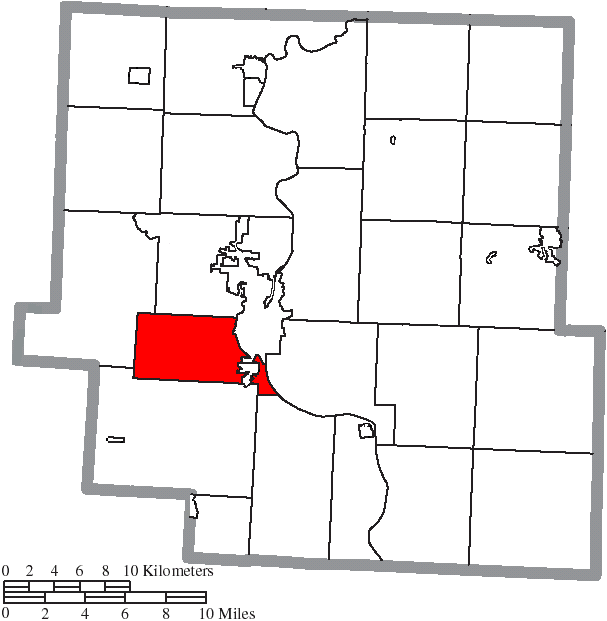
- Location of Springfield Township in Muskingum County
- Coordinates: 39°54′32″N 82°2′20″W
- Country: United States
- State: Ohio
- County: Muskingum

Area
  - Total: 18.6 sq mi (48.3 km^{2})
  - Land: 18.6 sq mi (48.1 km^{2})
  - Water: 0.039 sq mi (0.1 km^{2})
- Elevation: 860 ft (262 m)

Population (2020)
  - Total: 5,452
  - Density: 294/sq mi (113/km^{2})
- Time zone: UTC-5 (Eastern (EST))
  - Summer (DST): UTC-4 (EDT)
- FIPS code: 39-74125
- GNIS feature ID: 1086734

Springfield Township is one of the twenty-five townships of Muskingum County, Ohio, United States. The 2020 census found 5,452 people in the township.

== Geography ==
Located in the southwestern part of the county, it borders the following townships:

- Falls Township - north
- Washington Township - northeast corner
- Wayne Township - east
- Brush Creek Township - southeast
- Newton Township - southwest
- Hopewell Township - northwest

Two municipalities are located in Springfield Township: the village of South Zanesville in the southwest, and part of the city of Zanesville, the county seat of Muskingum County, in the northeast.

== Name and history ==
It is one of eleven Springfield Townships statewide.

== Government ==
The township is governed by a three-member board of trustees, who are elected in November of odd-numbered years to a four-year term beginning on the following January 1. Two are elected in the year after the presidential election and one is elected in the year before it. There is also an elected township fiscal officer, who serves a four-year term beginning on April 1 of the year after the election, which is held in November of the year before the presidential election. Vacancies in the fiscal officership or on the board of trustees are filled by the remaining trustees.
