= Madison Township, Perry County, Ohio =

Township in Ohio, US

- Township
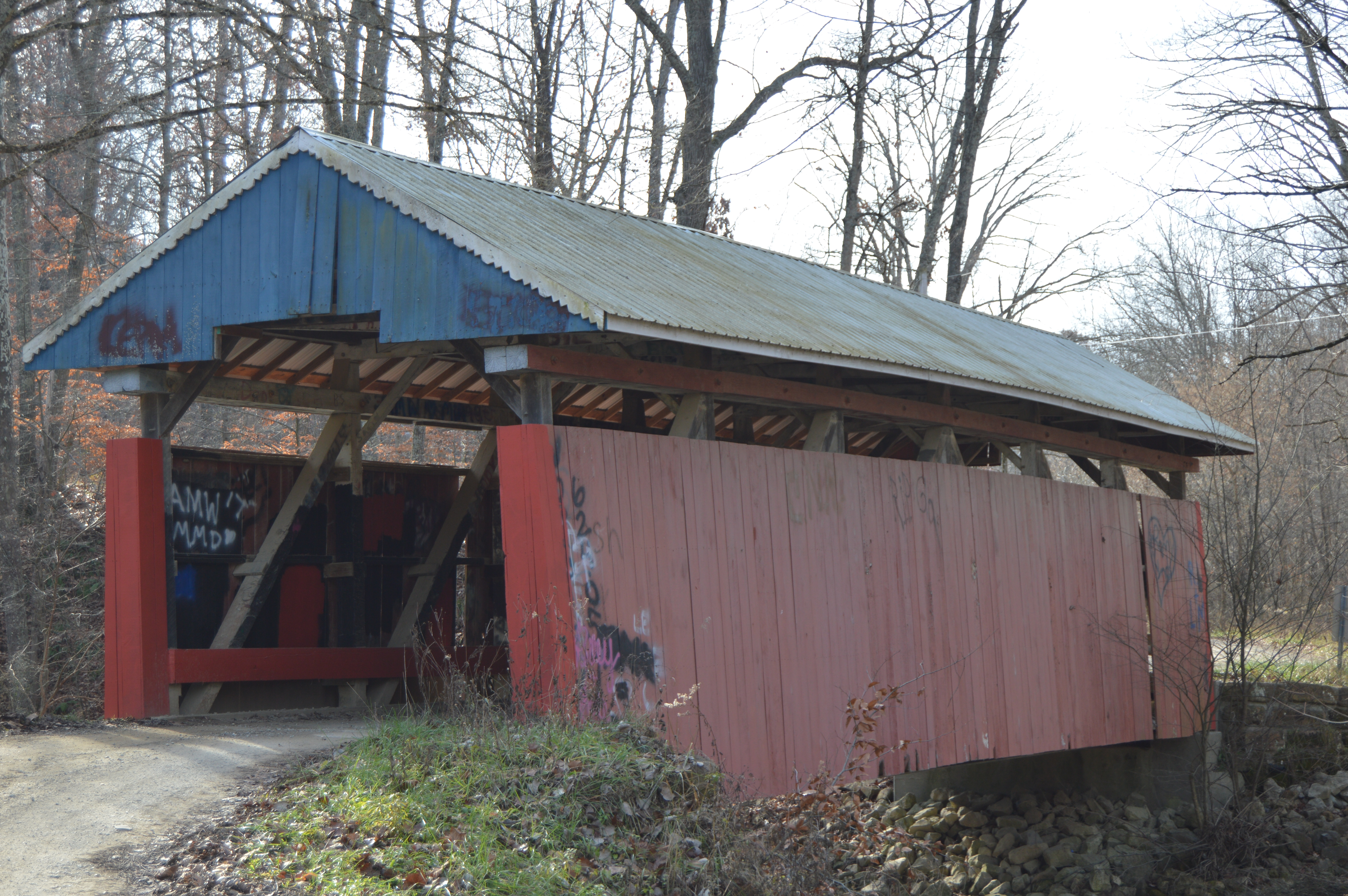
- Jack's Hollow Covered Bridge

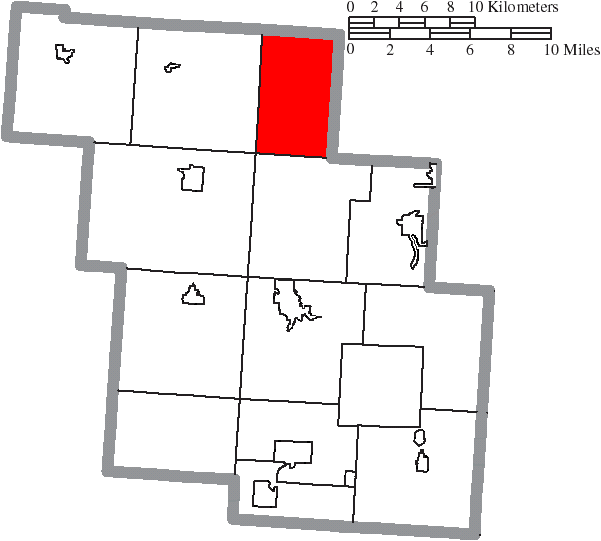
- Location of Madison Township in Perry County
- Coordinates: 39°52′18″N 82°12′23″W
- Country: United States
- State: Ohio
- County: Perry

Area
  - Total: 23.3 sq mi (60.4 km^{2})
  - Land: 23.3 sq mi (60.4 km^{2})
  - Water: 0 sq mi (0.0 km^{2})
- Elevation: 794 ft (242 m)

Population (2020)
  - Total: 1,367
  - Density: 58.6/sq mi (22.6/km^{2})
- Time zone: UTC-5 (Eastern (EST))
  - Summer (DST): UTC-4 (EDT)
- FIPS code: 39-46550
- GNIS feature ID: 1086784

Madison Township is one of the fourteen townships of Perry County, Ohio, United States. The 2020 census found 1,367 people in the township.

== Geography ==
Located in the northeastern corner of the county, it borders the following townships:

- Hopewell Township, Muskingum County – north
- Newton Township, Muskingum County – east
- Clayton Township – south
- Pleasant Township – southwest corner
- Hopewell Township – west
- Bowling Green Township, Licking County – northwest corner

No municipalities are located in Madison Township, although the unincorporated community of Mount Perry lies in the township's north.

== Name and history ==
It is one of twenty Madison Townships statewide.

== Government ==
The township is governed by a three-member board of trustees, who are elected in November of odd-numbered years to a four-year term beginning on the following January 1. Two are elected in the year after the presidential election and one is elected in the year before it. There is also an elected township fiscal officer, who serves a four-year term beginning on April 1 of the year after the election, which is held in November of the year before the presidential election. Vacancies in the fiscal officership or on the board of trustees are filled by the remaining trustees.
