= Pike Township, Perry County, Ohio =

Township in Ohio, US

- Township
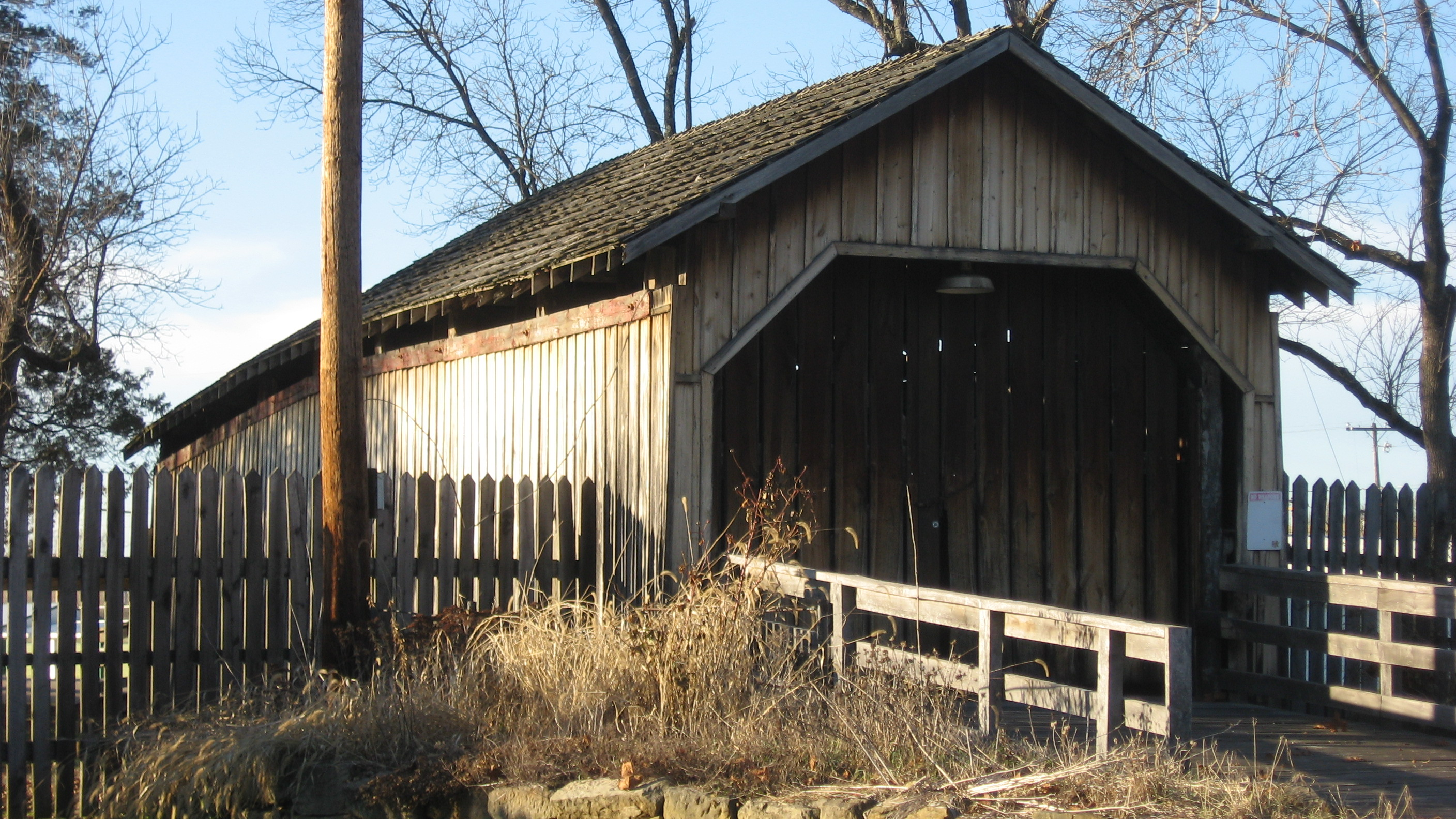
- Bowman Mill Covered Bridge at the county fairgrounds

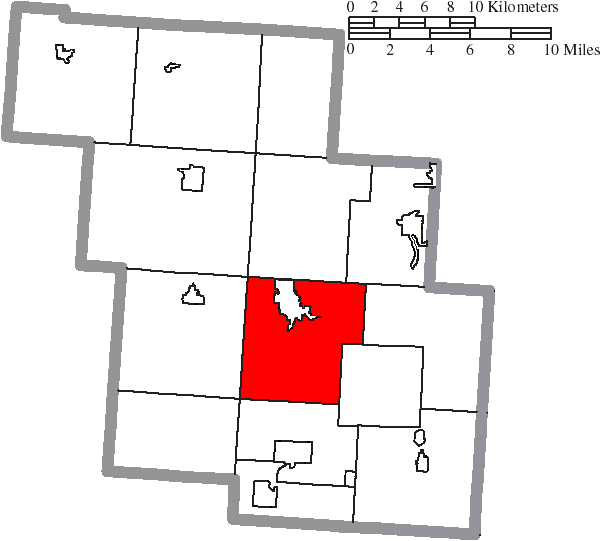
- Location of Pike Township in Perry County
- Coordinates: 39°42′22″N 82°12′10″W
- Country: United States
- State: Ohio
- County: Perry

Area
  - Total: 32.6 sq mi (84.4 km^{2})
  - Land: 32.0 sq mi (82.8 km^{2})
  - Water: 0.62 sq mi (1.6 km^{2})
- Elevation: 932 ft (284 m)

Population (2020)
  - Total: 6,688
  - Density: 209/sq mi (80.8/km^{2})
- Time zone: UTC-5 (Eastern (EST))
  - Summer (DST): UTC-4 (EDT)
- FIPS code: 39-62680
- GNIS feature ID: 1086787

Pike Township is one of the fourteen townships of Perry County, Ohio, United States. The 2020 census found 6,688 people in the township.

== Geography ==
Located in the central part of the county, it borders the following townships:

- Clayton Township - north
- Harrison Township - northeast
- Bearfield Township - east
- Pleasant Township - southeast
- Salt Lick Township - south
- Monday Creek Township - southwest corner
- Jackson Township - west
- Reading Township - northwest corner

The city of New Lexington, the county seat of and only city in Perry County, is located in northern Pike Township, and the unincorporated community of Bristol lies in the township's south.

== Name and history ==
Pike Township was organized around 1814, and named for Zebulon Pike, a United States Army captain. It is one of eight Pike Townships statewide.

== Government ==
The township is governed by a three-member board of trustees, who are elected in November of odd-numbered years to a four-year term beginning on the following January 1. Two are elected in the year after the presidential election and one is elected in the year before it. There is also an elected township fiscal officer, who serves a four-year term beginning on April 1 of the year after the election, which is held in November of the year before the presidential election. Vacancies in the fiscal officership or on the board of trustees are filled by the remaining trustees.
