= Clayton Township, Ohio =

Township in Ohio, US

Clayton Township, Perry County, Ohio
- Township
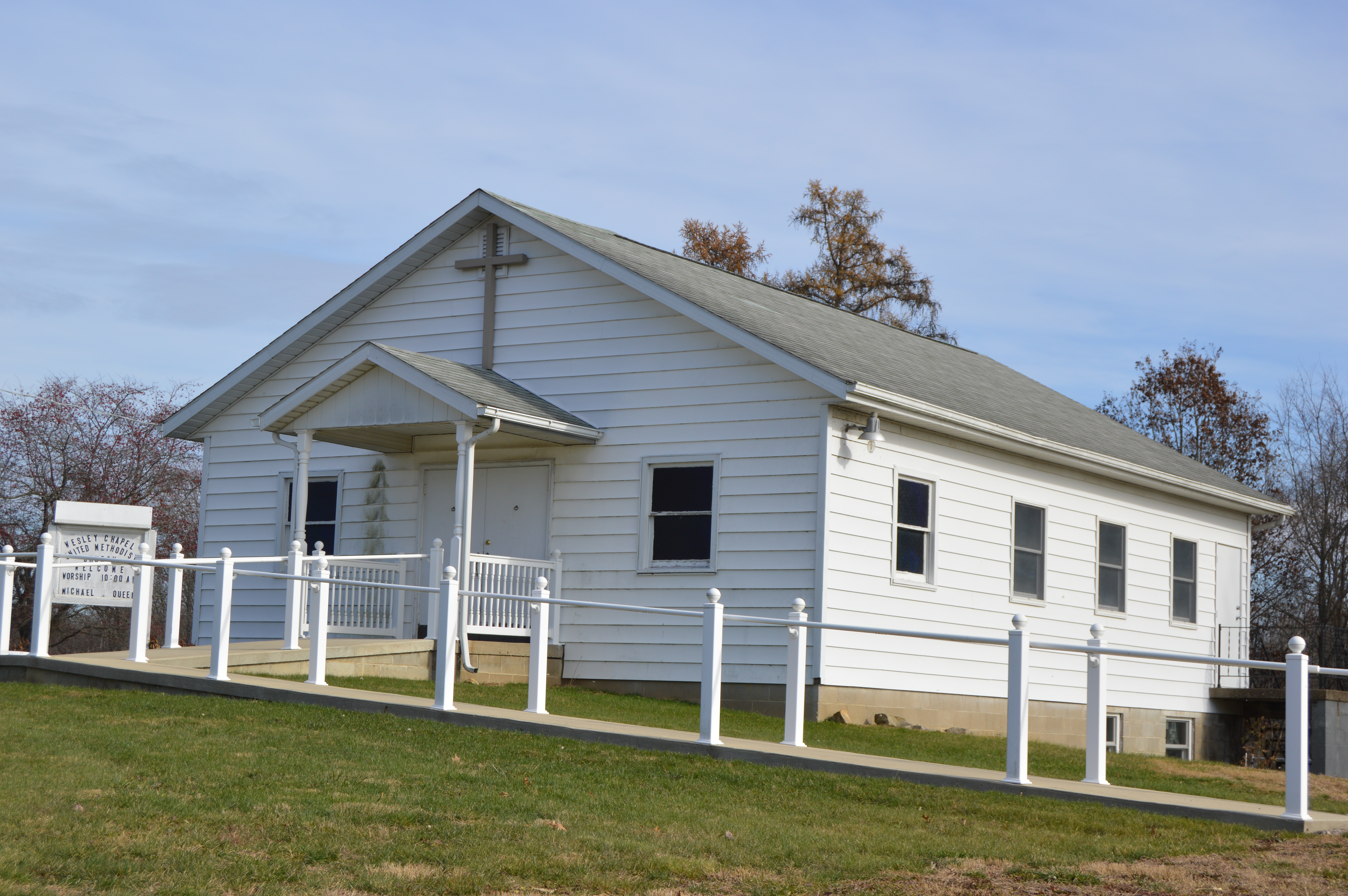
- Wesley Chapel United Methodist Church

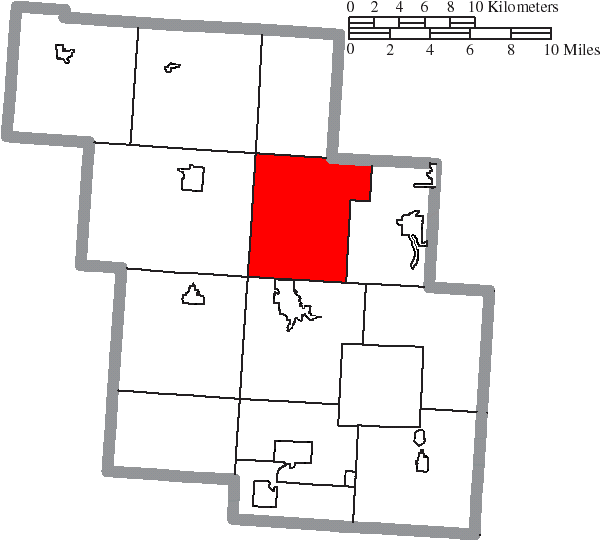
- Location of Clayton Township in Perry County
- Coordinates: 39°47′1″N 82°11′39″W
- Country: United States
- State: Ohio
- County: Perry

Area
  - Total: 31.6 sq mi (81.9 km^{2})
  - Land: 31.3 sq mi (81.0 km^{2})
  - Water: 0.31 sq mi (0.8 km^{2})
- Elevation: 981 ft (299 m)

Population (2020)
  - Total: 1,565
  - Density: 50/sq mi (19.3/km^{2})
- Time zone: UTC-5 (Eastern (EST))
  - Summer (DST): UTC-4 (EDT)
- FIPS code: 39-15658
- GNIS feature ID: 1086779

Clayton Township is one of the fourteen townships of Perry County, Ohio, United States. The 2020 census found 1,432 people in the township.

== Geography ==
Located in the north central part of the county, it borders the following townships:

- Madison Township – north
- Newton Township, Muskingum County – northeast
- Harrison Township – east
- Pike Township – south
- Jackson Township – southwest corner
- Reading Township – west
- Hopewell Township – northwest corner

No municipalities are located in Clayton Township, although the unincorporated community of Rehoboth lies in the township's south.

== Name and history ==
It is the only Clayton Township statewide.

== Government ==
The township is governed by a three-member board of trustees, who are elected in November of odd-numbered years to a four-year term beginning on the following January 1. Two are elected in the year after the presidential election and one is elected in the year before it. There is also an elected township fiscal officer, who serves a four-year term beginning on April 1 of the year after the election, which is held in November of the year before the presidential election. Vacancies in the fiscal officership or on the board of trustees are filled by the remaining trustees.
