= Buckeye Fork =

Stream in Ohio, U.S.

Coordinates: 39°51′18″N 82°06′33″W

Buckeye Fork is a stream in the U.S. state of Ohio. It is a tributary to the Muskingum River.

A variant name is "Buckeye Creek". The stream was named for the buckeye trees along its course.

== See also ==
- List of rivers of Ohio
