= Roseville, Ohio =

- Village
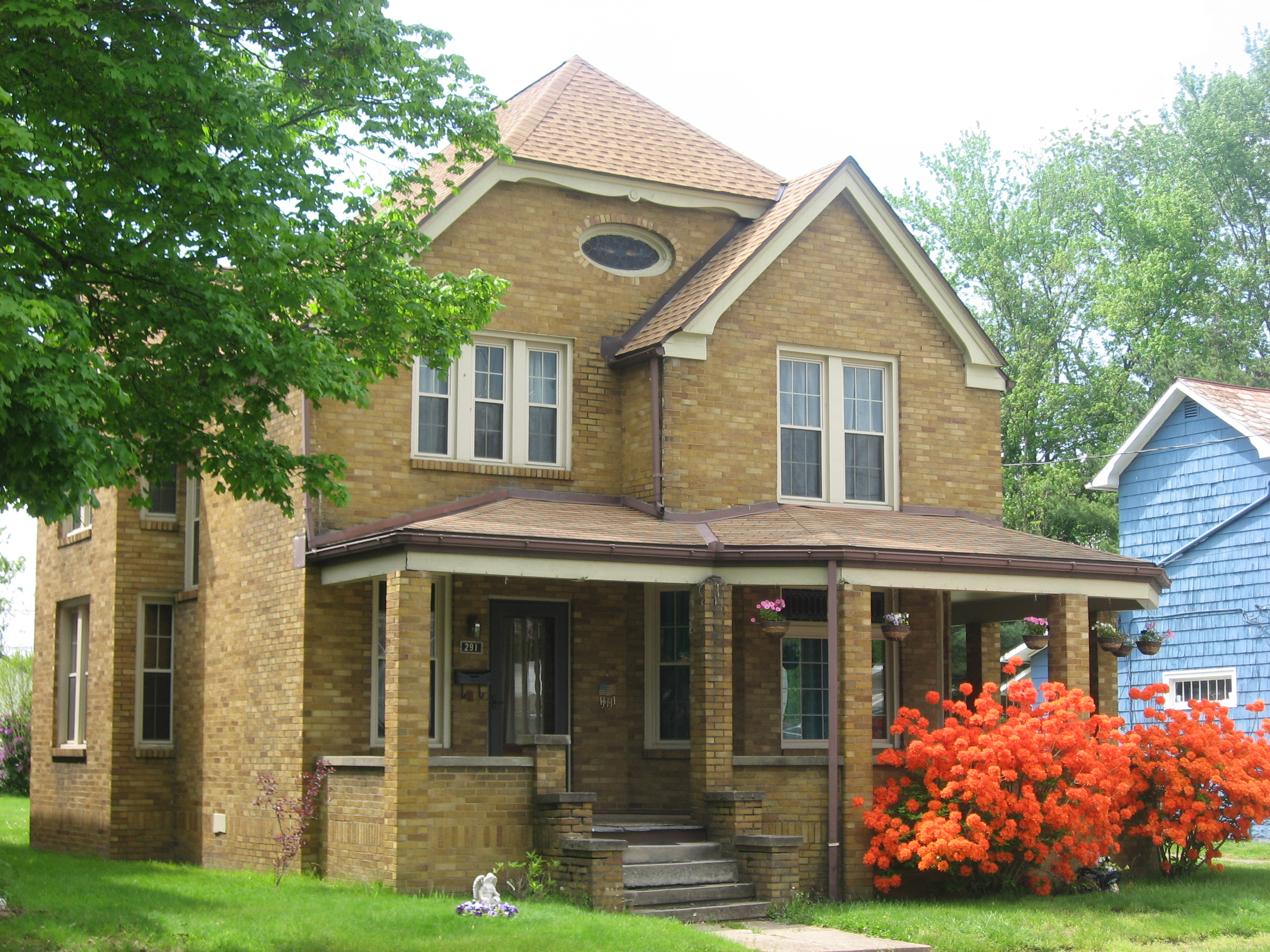
- The C.W. Ransbottom House, a historic site on Washington Street

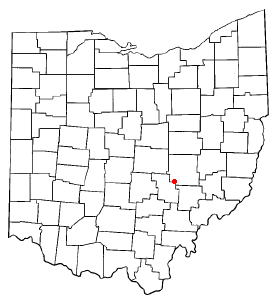
- Location of Roseville, Ohio

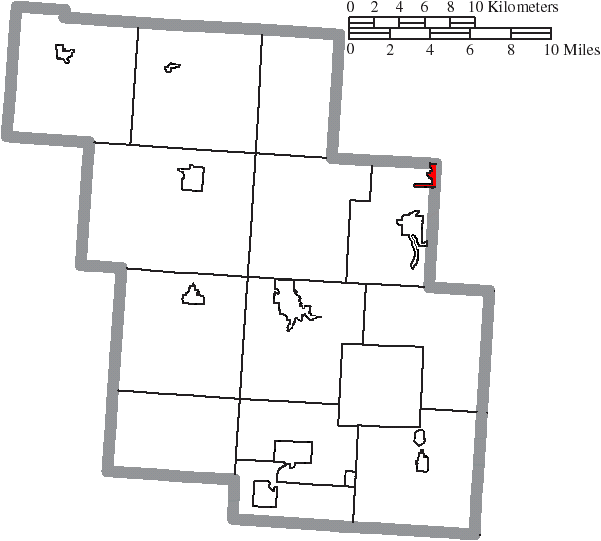
- Location of Roseville in Perry County
- Coordinates: 39°48′23″N 82°04′33″W
- Country: United States
- State: Ohio
- Counties: Perry, Muskingum
- Townships: Harrison, Clay

Area
  - Total: 0.69 sq mi (1.79 km^{2})
  - Land: 0.69 sq mi (1.78 km^{2})
  - Water: 0.0039 sq mi (0.01 km^{2})
- Elevation: 748 ft (228 m)

Population (2020)
  - Total: 1,746
  - Density: 2,539.8/sq mi (980.62/km^{2})
- Time zone: UTC-5 (Eastern (EST))
  - Summer (DST): UTC-4 (EDT)
- ZIP code: 43777
- Area code: 740
- FIPS code: 39-68560
- GNIS feature ID: 2399124
- Website: https://www.rosevilleoh.gov/

Roseville is a village in Muskingum and Perry counties in the U.S. state of Ohio, along Moxahala Creek. The population was 1,746 at the 2020 census. It is part of the Zanesville micropolitan area. Roseville is served by a branch of the Muskingum County Library System.

== History ==
Roseville was laid out in 1812 by Ezekiel Rose. It was initially named New Milford, but the name had been changed to Roseville by the time a post office was applied for in 1830. By 1833, Roseville had a gristmill and saw mill. Roseville was incorporated in 1840, with Dr. James Little elected as the first mayor.

=== Ceramics ===
Roseville is located in the "clay belt of Ohio" and has an extensive history of ceramic manufacturing:

==== Roseville Pottery Company ====
The Roseville Pottery Company was founded in 1890 by J.F. Weaver and initially focused on producing practical and functional stoneware pottery. The company headquarters were relocated to Zanesville, Ohio, in 1898.

Starting in 1900, under the guidance of Ross C. Purdy, the company began producing art pottery pieces for a higher market. This led to great success for the company and they went on to release many popular lines and designs such as Rozane, Dahlcraft Hexagon, and Pinecone.

Over time, production was consolidated in Zanesville and in 1954 Roseville Pottery ceased operations.

==== Ransbottom Pottery Company ====
The Ransbottom Pottery Company was founded in 1900 by brothers Frank, Ed, Johnnie, and Mort Ransbottom. The firm grew to become the largest American producer of stoneware jars by 1916. In 1920 the pottery merged to form Robinson-Ransbottom Pottery. The new group produced art pottery, garden pottery, and utilitarian ceramics.

Robinson-Ransbottom remained in operation through the 20th century and remained the nation's leading stoneware producer through 1971. In 2005, after suffering declines in the garden pottery market that had come to be the pottery's focus, Robinson-Ransbottom ceased operations.

==== Nelson McCoy Pottery Company ====
The Nelson McCoy Pottery Company was founded in Roseville in 1910 and was a major manufacturer of functional pottery through the 20th century. After changes in ownership, the company ceased operations in 1990.

==== Burley Clay Products Company ====
Burley Clay Products Company had been founded in 1923 in South Zanesville, Ohio, and relocated their operations to the former Nelson McCoy factory in 2000. They continue to manufacture with area clay and are a manufacturer of traditional stoneware garden pottery such as flowerpots, jardinieres, and bird baths.

==== Ceramic events and museums ====
Since 1966, Roseville and nearby Crooksville, Ohio, have alternated as hosts of the Crooksville-Roseville Pottery Festival. The event began as a way to highlight and promote the struggling industry as it was suffering a "slow-death." The inaugural festival was boosted by a surprise appearance from Ohio governor James A. Rhodes.

The festival continued even as area potteries went out of business, and over time shifted focus from current industry to the region's history of ceramic manufacturing.

The Clay Center of Ohio, a pottery museum, is located just south of Roseville along State Route 93.

== Geography ==
According to the United States Census Bureau, the village has a total area of 0.71 square miles (1.84 km^{2}), of which 0.70 square miles (1.81 km^{2}) is land and 0.01 square miles (0.03 km^{2}) is water.

== Demographics ==
Historical population
Census	Pop.	Note	%±
1830	62		—
1870	426		—
1880	531		24.6%
1890	714		34.5%
1900	1,207		69.0%
1910	2,113		75.1%
1920	1,349		−36.2%
1930	1,413		4.7%
1940	1,320		−6.6%
1950	1,808		37.0%
1960	1,749		−3.3%
1970	1,767		1.0%
1980	1,915		8.4%
1990	1,847		−3.6%
2000	1,936		4.8%
2010	1,852		−4.3%
2020	1,746		−5.7%
U.S. Decennial Census

=== 2010 census ===
As of the census of 2010, there were 1,852 people, 699 households, and 492 families living in the village. The population density was 2,645.7 inhabitants per square mile (1,021.5/km^{2}). There were 798 housing units at an average density of 1,140.0 per square mile (440.2/km^{2}). The racial makeup of the village was 97.5% White, 0.5% African American, 0.2% Native American, 0.2% Asian, 0.2% from other races, and 1.5% from two or more races. Hispanic or Latino of any race were 0.6% of the population.

There were 699 households, of which 42.1% had children under the age of 18 living with them, 43.6% were married couples living together, 20.2% had a female householder with no husband present, 6.6% had a male householder with no wife present, and 29.6% were non-families. 22.9% of all households were made up of individuals, and 8.3% had someone living alone who was 65 years of age or older. The average household size was 2.65 and the average family size was 3.05.

The median age in the village was 33.7 years. 29.2% of residents were under the age of 18; 8.4% were between the ages of 18 and 24; 27.1% were from 25 to 44; 23.6% were from 45 to 64; and 11.7% were 65 years of age or older. The gender makeup of the village was 48.5% male and 51.5% female.

=== 2000 census ===
As of the census of 2000, there were 1,936 people, 729 households, and 529 families living in the village. The population density was 2,782.2 inhabitants per square mile (1,074.2/km^{2}). There were 803 housing units at an average density of 1,154.0 per square mile (445.6/km^{2}). The racial makeup of the village was 98.24% White, 0.31% African American, 0.31% Native American, and 1.14% from two or more races. Hispanic or Latino of any race were 0.36% of the population.

There were 729 households, out of which 42.1% had children under the age of 18 living with them, 50.9% were married couples living together, 16.3% had a female householder with no husband present, and 27.3% were non-families. 23.3% of all households were made up of individuals, and 11.4% had someone living alone who was 65 years of age or older. The average household size was 2.66 and the average family size was 3.11.

In the village, the population was spread out, with 30.7% under the age of 18, 11.0% from 18 to 24, 29.9% from 25 to 44, 17.2% from 45 to 64, and 11.2% who were 65 years of age or older. The median age was 30 years. For every 100 females there were 90.7 males. For every 100 females age 18 and over, there were 82.4 males.

The median income for a household in the village was $24,706, and the median income for a family was $26,964. Males had a median income of $26,250 versus $15,463 for females. The per capita income for the village was $12,707. About 22.3% of families and 27.6% of the population were below the poverty line, including 41.3% of those under age 18 and 7.4% of those age 65 or over.

== Notable people ==
- Dick Hoover, professional bowler and member of the USBC Hall of Fame.
- Dizzy Nutter, baseball player.
- Ronald E. Rosser, Medal of Honor recipient.
