= 107.3 FM =

FM radio frequency

The following radio stations broadcast on FM frequency 107.3 MHz:

== Argentina ==
- City in Jujuy
- Impacto in Bella Vista, Corrientes
- Las Rosas in Córdoba
- Magic Box in Miramar, Buenos Aires
- Master's in Tierra del Fuego, Ushuaia
- Max in Wheelwright, Santa Fe
- RH1 Integracion in Córdoba
- Rck in Resistencia, Chaco
- Tinkunaco in José C. Paz, Buenos Aires

== Australia ==
- 2REM in Albury, New South Wales
- 2SER in Sydney, New South Wales
- 4CAB in Gold Coast, Queensland
- 5RRR in Woomera, South Australia
- ABC Classic in Darwin, Northern Territory
- ABC Classic in Toowoomba, Queensland
- ABC NewsRadio in Port Lincoln, South Australia
- 7XXX in Hobart, Tasmania
- 6HFM in Perth, Western Australia
- Radio National in Charleville, Queensland
- Radio National in Cooktown, Queensland
- Radio National in Mount Isa, Queensland
- Radio National in Roma, Queensland

== Canada (Channel 297) ==
- CBAF-FM-9 in Yarmouth, Nova Scotia
- CBSI-FM-18 in St-August-Saguenay, Quebec
- CBTK-FM-2 in Grand Forks, British Columbia
- CFGQ-FM in Calgary, Alberta
- CFMH-FM in Saint John, New Brunswick
- CFRT-FM in Iqaluit, Nunavut
- CHBE-FM in Victoria, British Columbia
- CHNC-FM-3 in Perce, Quebec
- CHUK-FM in Pointe-Bleue/Masteuiatsh, Quebec
- CITA-FM-1 in Sussex, New Brunswick
- CITE-FM in Montreal, Quebec
- CJDL-FM in Tillsonburg, Ontario
- CJME-3-FM in Warmley, Saskatchewan
- CJWC-FM in Ucluelet, British Columbia
- CKHR-FM in Hay River, Northwest Territories
- CKOE-FM in Moncton, New Brunswick

== China ==
- Beijing Public Service Radio in Beijing
- CNR Music Radio in Guiyang
- Boluo People's Radio in Guizhou

== Malaysia ==
- Kool FM in Perlis and Alor Setar, Kedah
- Fly FM in Kota Bharu, Kelantan
- Melody in Malacca

== Mexico ==
- XEQR-FM in Mexico City
- XHARDJ-FM in Arandas, Jalisco
- XHCIF-FM in Calvillo, Aguascalientes
- XHFG-FM in Tijuana, Baja California
- XHGTS-FM in Nuevo Laredo, Tamaulipas
- XHSCAG-FM in Cananea, Sonora
- XHSCAI-FM in Santa Clara del Cobre, Salvador Escalante, Michoacán
- XHSCBN-FM in San Felipe, Guanajuato
- XHSCKI-FM in Santa Cruz Amilpas, Oaxaca
- XHSIAB-FM in San Felipe de la Peña, San Juan Bautista Tuxtepec, Oaxaca
- XHUJAT-FM in Villahermosa, Tabasco

== New Zealand ==
- Various low-power stations up to 1 watt

== Paraguay ==
- ZPV137 at Areguá

== Philippines ==
- DWRB in Batangas City
- DWQS in Sorsogon City
- DYYB in Roxas, Capiz
- DXMS in Surigao City
- DXSU in Koronadal City

== United Kingdom ==
- Capital Mid-Counties in Leamington Spa
- Heart North and Mid Wales in Rhyl and Prestatyn
- Heartland FM in Crieff
- Hits Radio Cambridgeshire in Saffron Walden
- Lionheart Radio in Alnwick, Northumberland
- Mearns FM in Laurencekirk
- Nation Radio Wales in Swansea
- Stafford FM in Stafford, Staffordshire

== United States (Channel 297) ==
- KAJE in Ingleside, Texas
- KANY in Cosmopolis, Washington
- KAPN (FM) in Caldwell, Texas
- KBBK in Lincoln, Nebraska
- KBFG-LP in Seattle, Washington
- KCHR-FM in Cotton Plant, Arkansas
- KCVE-LP in Conroe, Texas
- KCZY in Crownpoint, New Mexico
- KEVM-FM in Junction, Texas
- KFFM in Yakima, Washington
- KFIP-LP in Kailua-Kona, Hawaii
- KFXR-FM in Chinle, Arizona
- KGRS in Burlington, Iowa
- KHSA-LP in Hot Springs, Arkansas
- KHYY in Minatare, Nebraska
- KIMO in Townsend, Montana
- KIOW in Forest City, Iowa
- KISX in Whitehouse, Texas
- KIXW-FM in Lenwood, California
- KIYK in Saint George, Utah
- KJAS (FM) in Jasper, Texas
- KLFX in Nolanville, Texas
- KLSI in Mooreland, Oklahoma
- KLVS in Livermore, California
- KMJK in North Kansas City, Missouri
- KMLM-FM in Grover Beach, California
- KNCP-LP in Lapine, Oregon
- KNEZ in Hazen, Nevada
- KNPQ in Hershey, Nebraska
- KNUJ-FM in Sleepy Eye, Minnesota
- KOMS in Poteau, Oklahoma
- KOOS in North Bend, Oregon
- KOSE-FM in Osceola, Arkansas
- KQDR in Savoy, Texas
- KQRN in Mitchell, South Dakota
- KQZR in Hayden, Colorado
- KRDW-LP in Smith River, California
- KRKV in Las Animas, Colorado
- KRKW-LP in Waimea, Hawaii
- KRTE-FM in Steelville, Missouri
- KSLT in Spearfish, South Dakota
- KSSL in Post, Texas
- KTHR in Wichita, Kansas
- KTNH-LP in Walla Walla, Washington
- KVHH-LP in Turlock, California
- KVRW in Lawton, Oklahoma
- KWJZ-LP in High Rock, Washington
- KWRS-LP in Redlands, California
- KZLI-LP in Little Rock, Arkansas
- KZTO-LP in Burnet, Texas
- QMIX in Columbus, Indiana
- WAWB-LP in West Branch, Michigan
- WAWS in Claxton, Georgia
- WBBT-FM in Powhatan, Virginia
- WBRP in Baker, Louisiana
- WBYC-LP in Crisfield, Maryland
- WBZN in Old Town, Maine
- WCAA-LP in Albany, New York
- WCGQ in Columbus, Georgia
- WCLJ-LP in Lafayette, Indiana
- WCLX-LP in Moriah, New York
- WCMN-FM in Arecibo, Puerto Rico
- WCOH in Du Bois, Pennsylvania
- WCTT-FM in Corbin, Kentucky
- WCWT-FM in Centerville, Ohio
- WDDD-FM in Johnston City, Illinois
- WDKR in Maroa, Illinois
- WEGH in Northumberland, Pennsylvania
- WFCG in Tylertown, Mississippi
- WHMN-LP in Plymouth, Pennsylvania
- WJMZ-FM in Anderson, South Carolina
- WJUC in Swanton, Ohio
- WKFV in Clinton, North Carolina
- WKVB in Westborough, Massachusetts
- WKVU in Utica, New York
- WLVW in Washington, District of Columbia
- WMGL in Ravenel, South Carolina
- WMVK-LP in Perryville, Maryland
- WNBL in South Bristol, New York
- WNWV in Elyria, Ohio
- WNXR in Iron River, Wisconsin
- WOUG-LP in Douglas, Georgia
- WPLA in Jacksonville, Florida
- WPUR in Atlantic City, New Jersey
- WQLT-FM in Florence, Alabama
- WQZZ in Boligee, Alabama
- WRGV in Pensacola, Florida
- WRSW-FM in Warsaw, Indiana
- WRVZ in Miami, West Virginia
- WRWD-FM in Highland, New York
- WRZI in Hodgenville, Kentucky
- WRZQ-FM in Greensburg, Indiana
- WSJY in Fort Atkinson, Wisconsin
- WTNR in Greenville, Michigan
- WTRZ in Spencer, Tennessee
- WUPF in Powers, Michigan
- WVIE (FM) in Charlotte Amalie, Virgin Islands
- WVRA in Enfield, North Carolina
- WVSZ in Chesterfield, South Carolina
- WWQC in Clifton, Illinois
- WXED-LP in Ellwood City, Pennsylvania
- WXGL in Saint Petersburg, Florida
- WXLZ-FM in Lebanon, Virginia
- WYBZ in Crooksville, Ohio
- WZNO-LP in Cleveland, Tennessee
