= American Encaustic Tiling Company =

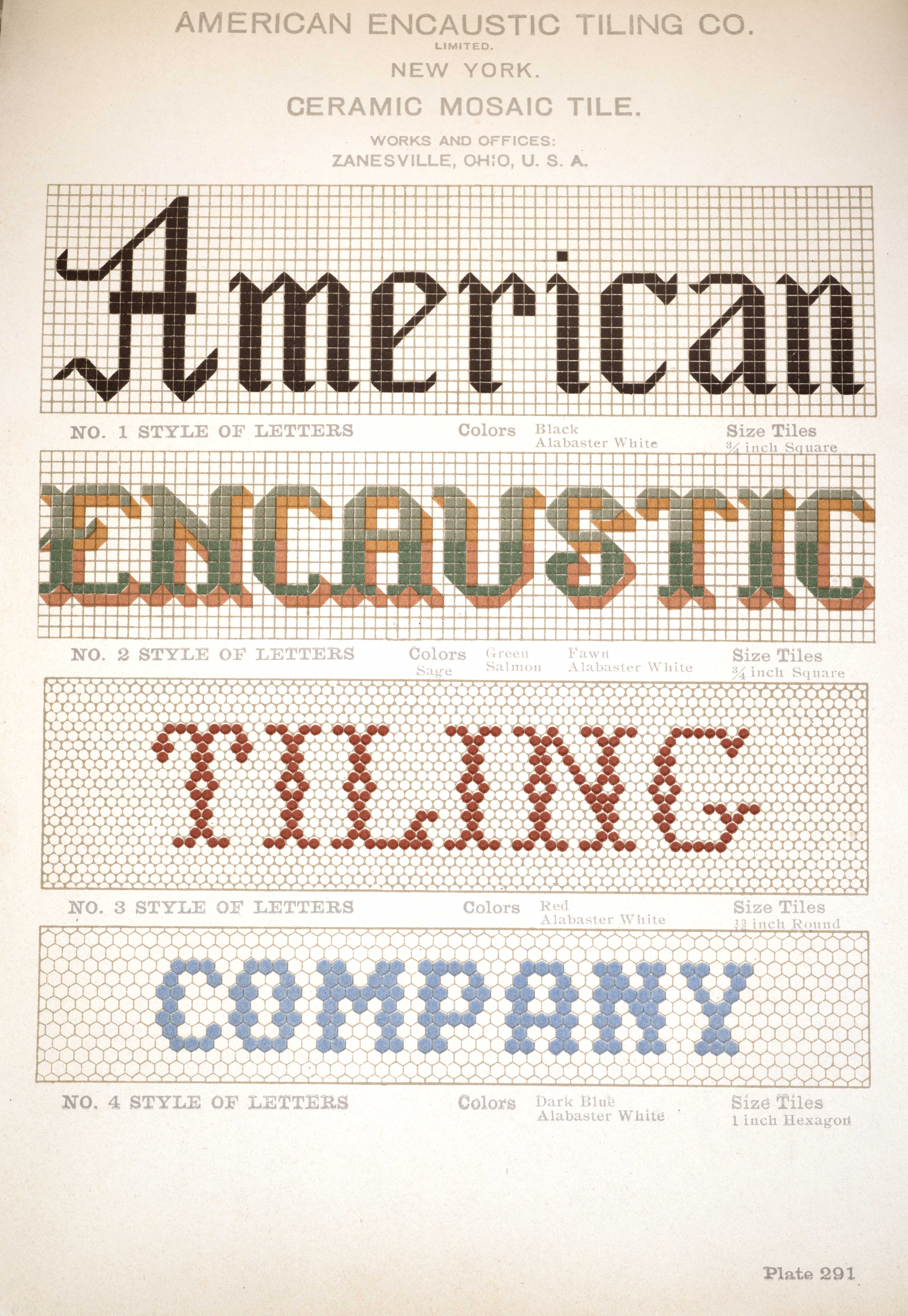

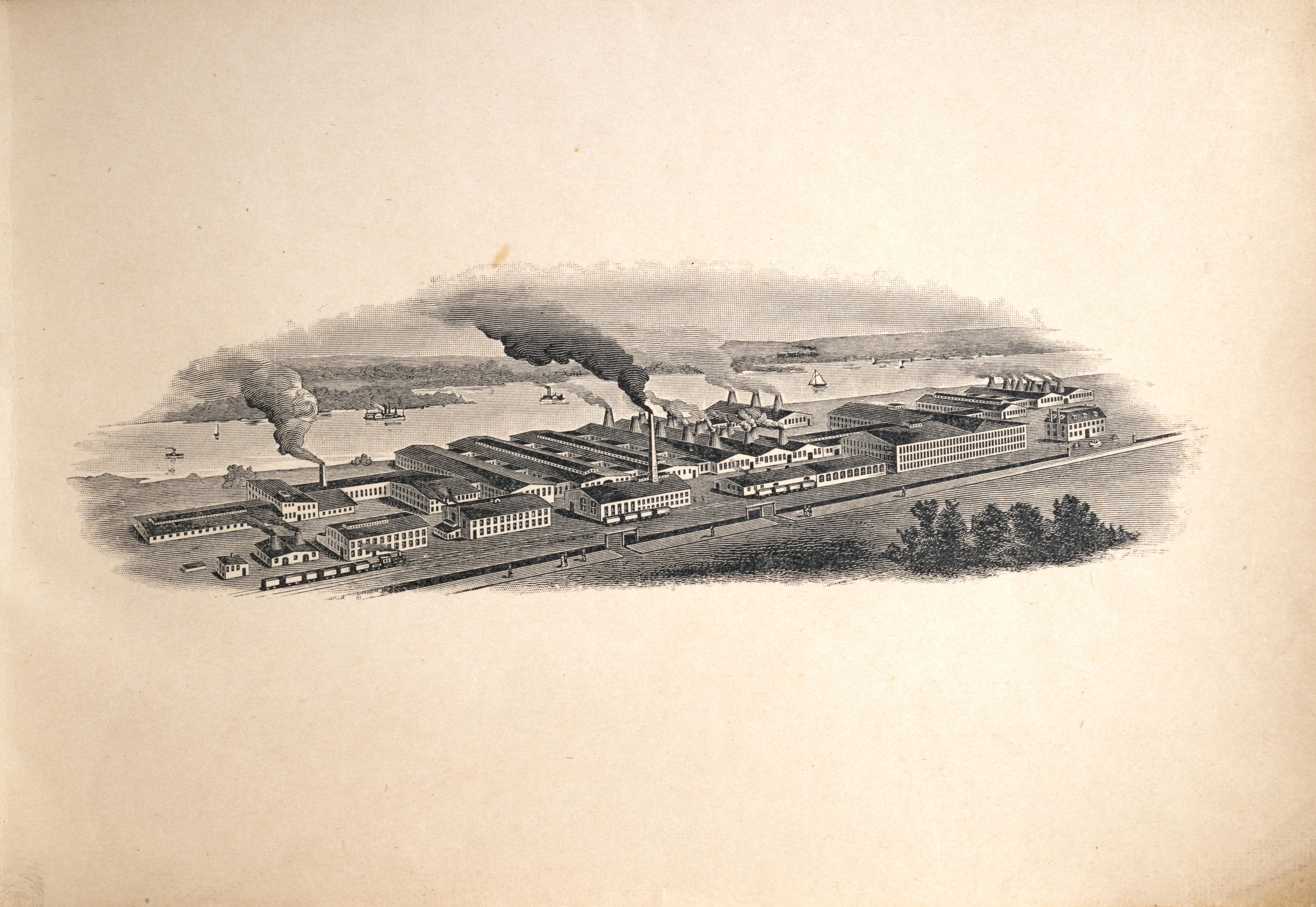

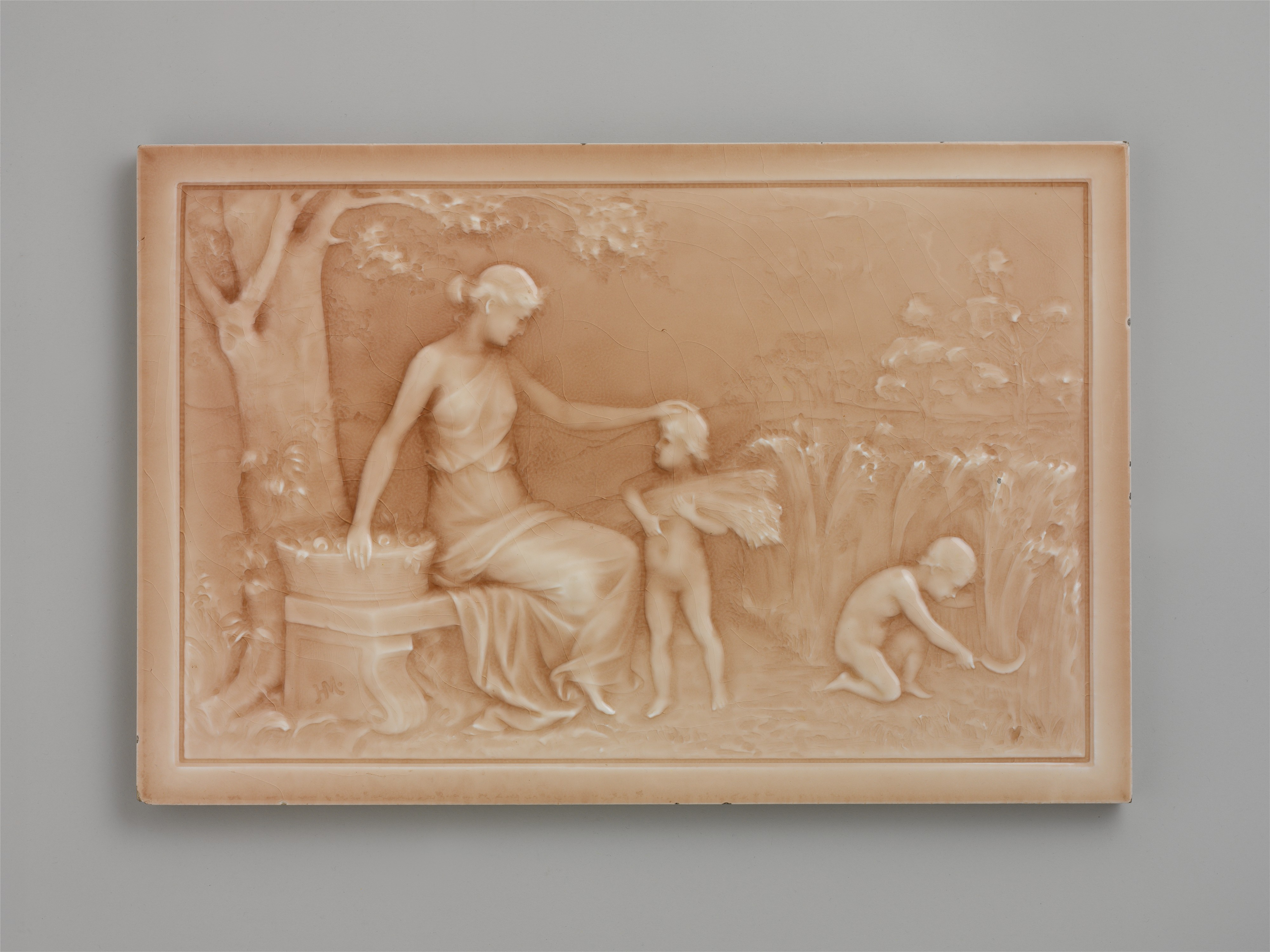

The American Encaustic Tiling Company was founded in New York, New York, in 1875, later establishing a factory in Zanesville, Ohio, in 1892. Their tiles were intended to compete with the English tiles that were selling in the United States for use in fireplaces and other architectural locations. The first glazed tiles were made in 1880 and embossed tiles were made in 1881. By 1890, they were the largest tile company in the world, and the small town of Zanesville nearly tripled in size over a thirty-year period as more people found work with the company. The firm closed in 1935 and was then reopened in 1937 as the Shawnee Pottery.

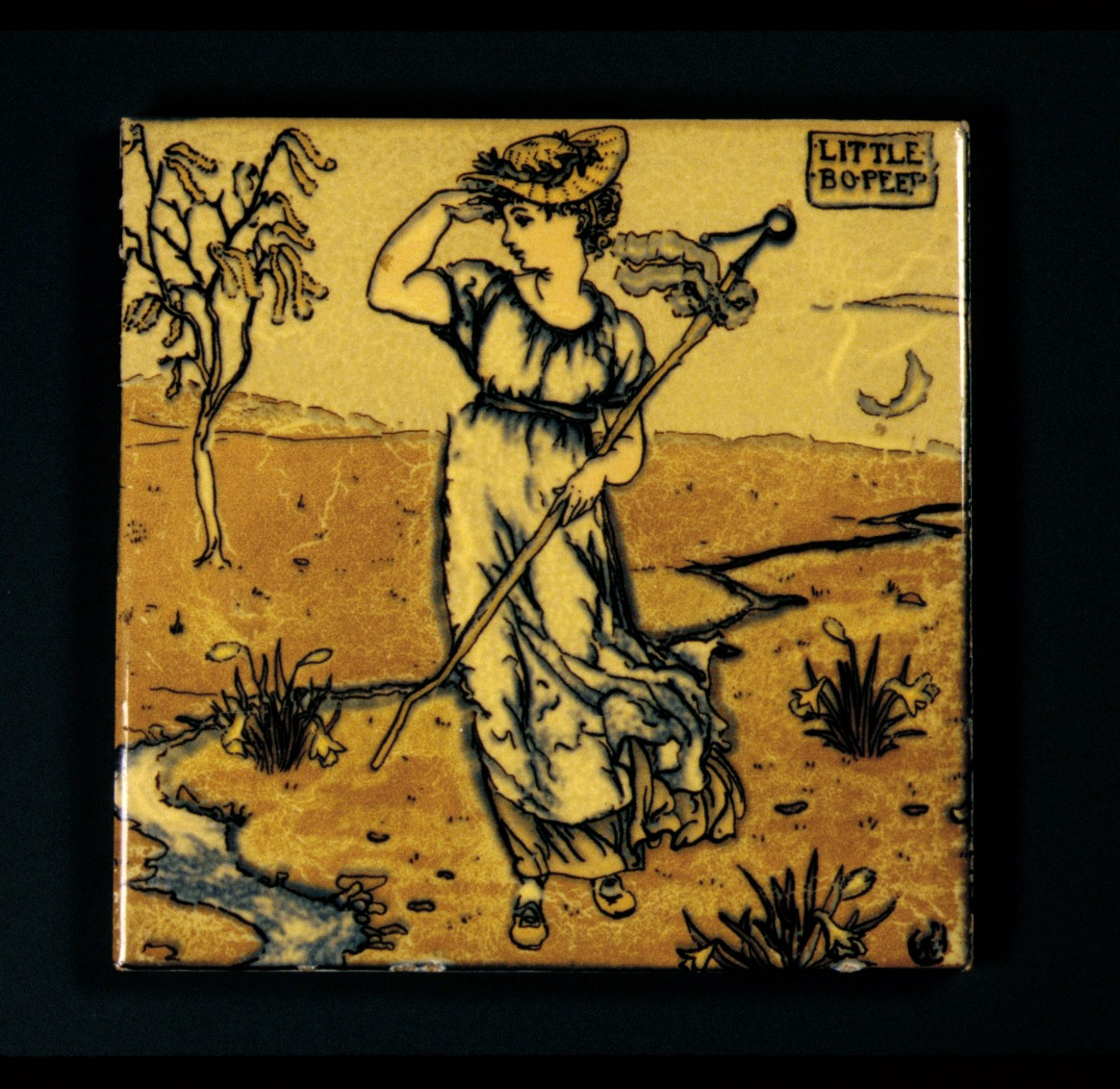
Little Bo Peep tile

Their tiles form a mural at the Borden's Dairy Factory at 2840 Atlantic Avenue in East New York.

Designers and architects of the original New York subway stations partnered with Encaustic to develop color and decoration schemes fur the future stations. An exhibit was paved in the future Columbus Circle station in 1901. It was covered up before the station opened in 1904. Encaustic lost the overall contract to The Greuby Faience Company, Encaustic's product did make it into some stations, and some of the work survives.

== Gallery ==
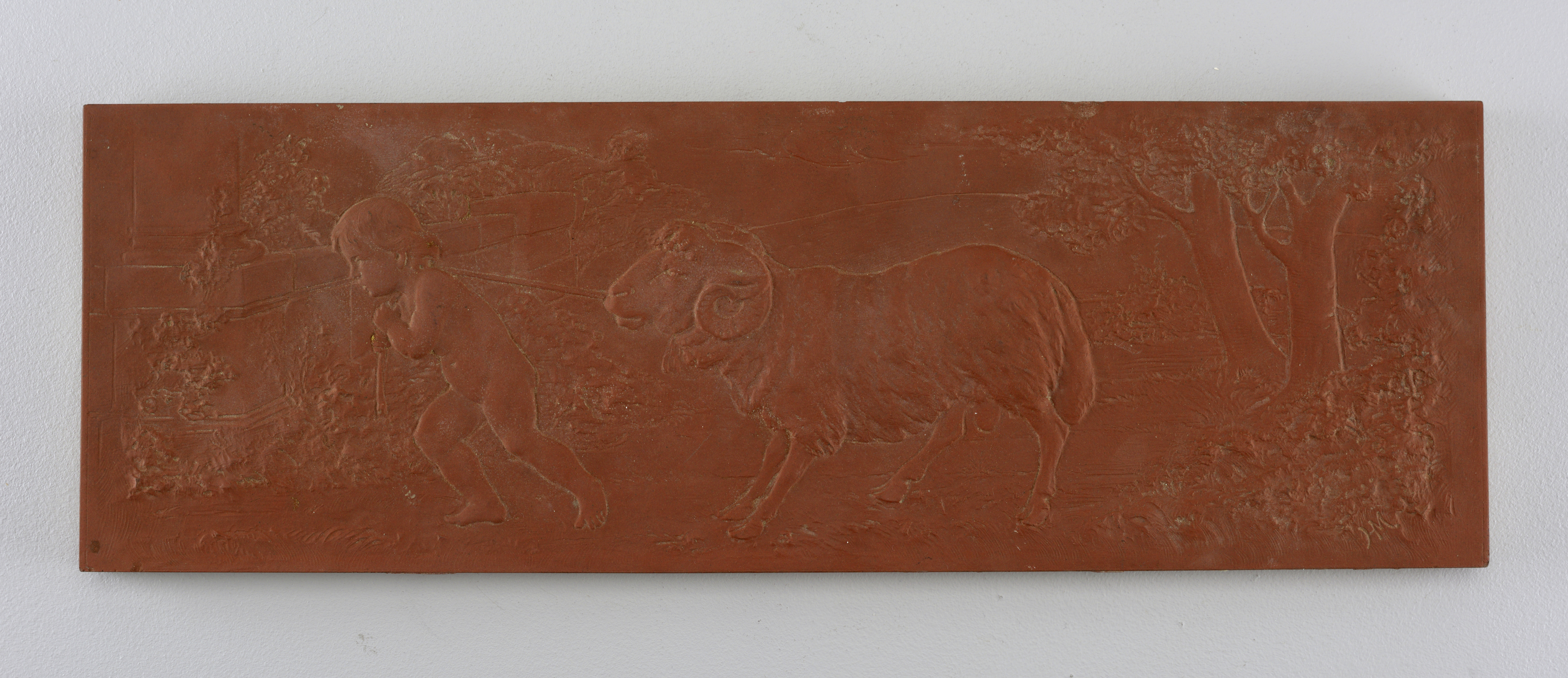

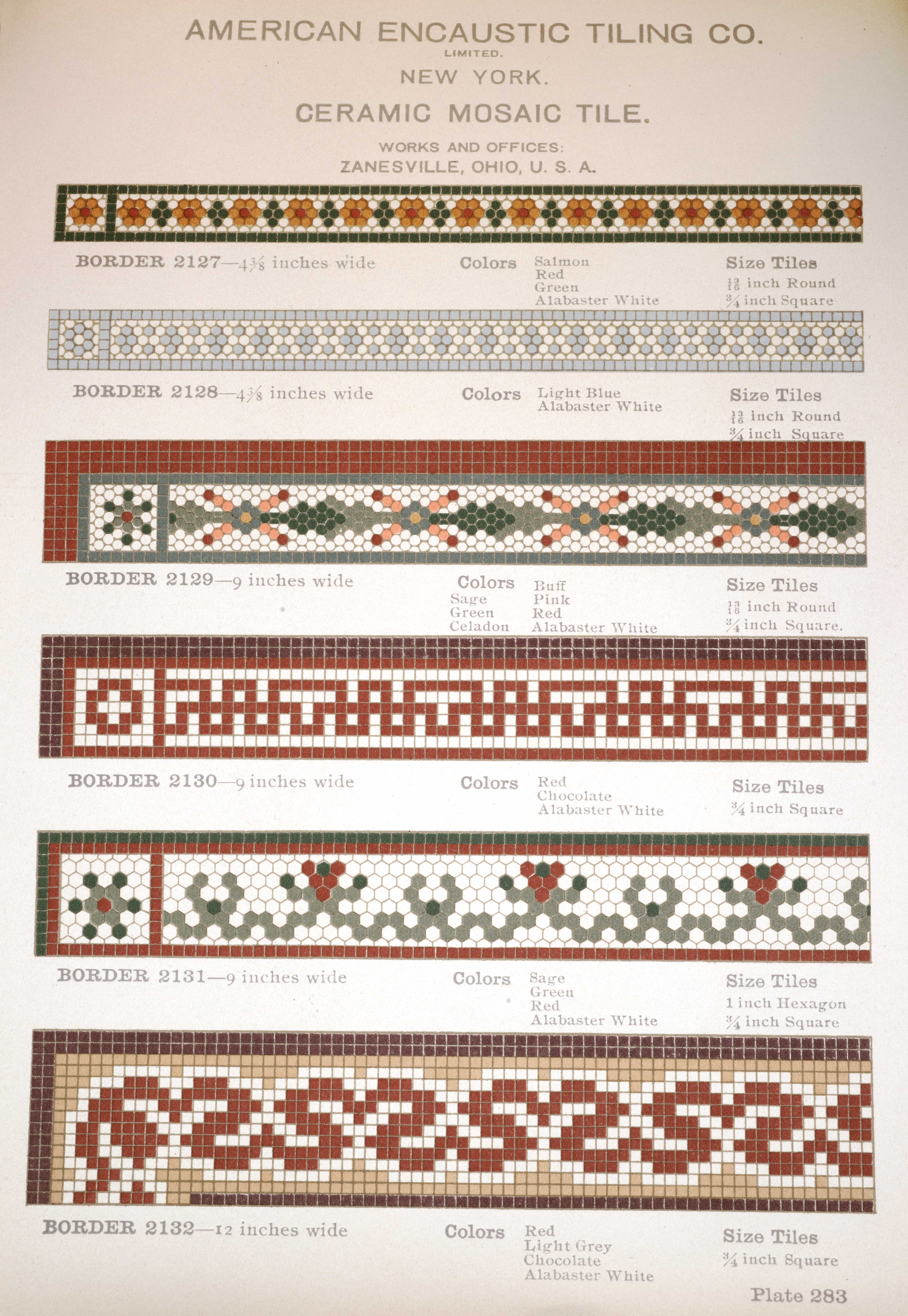

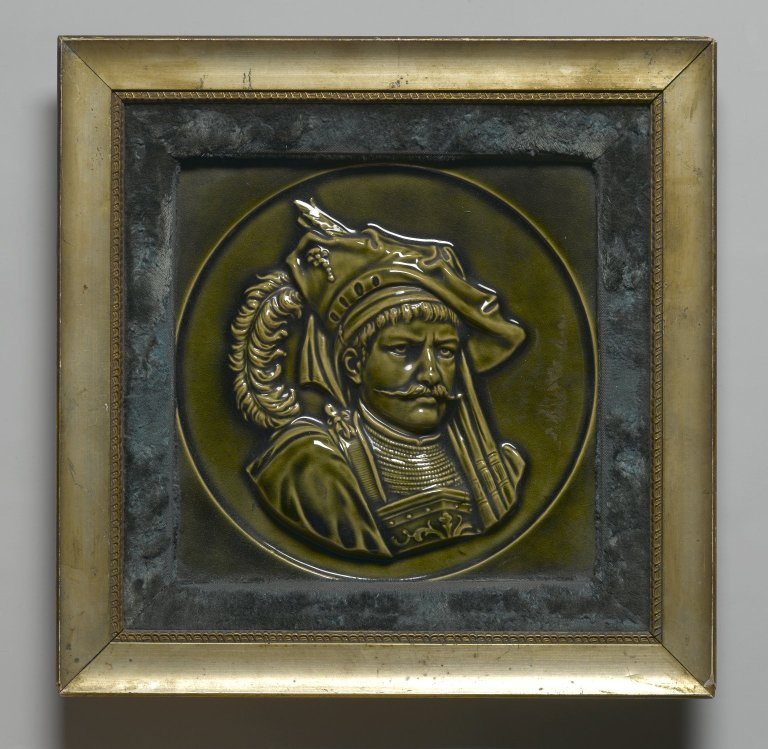

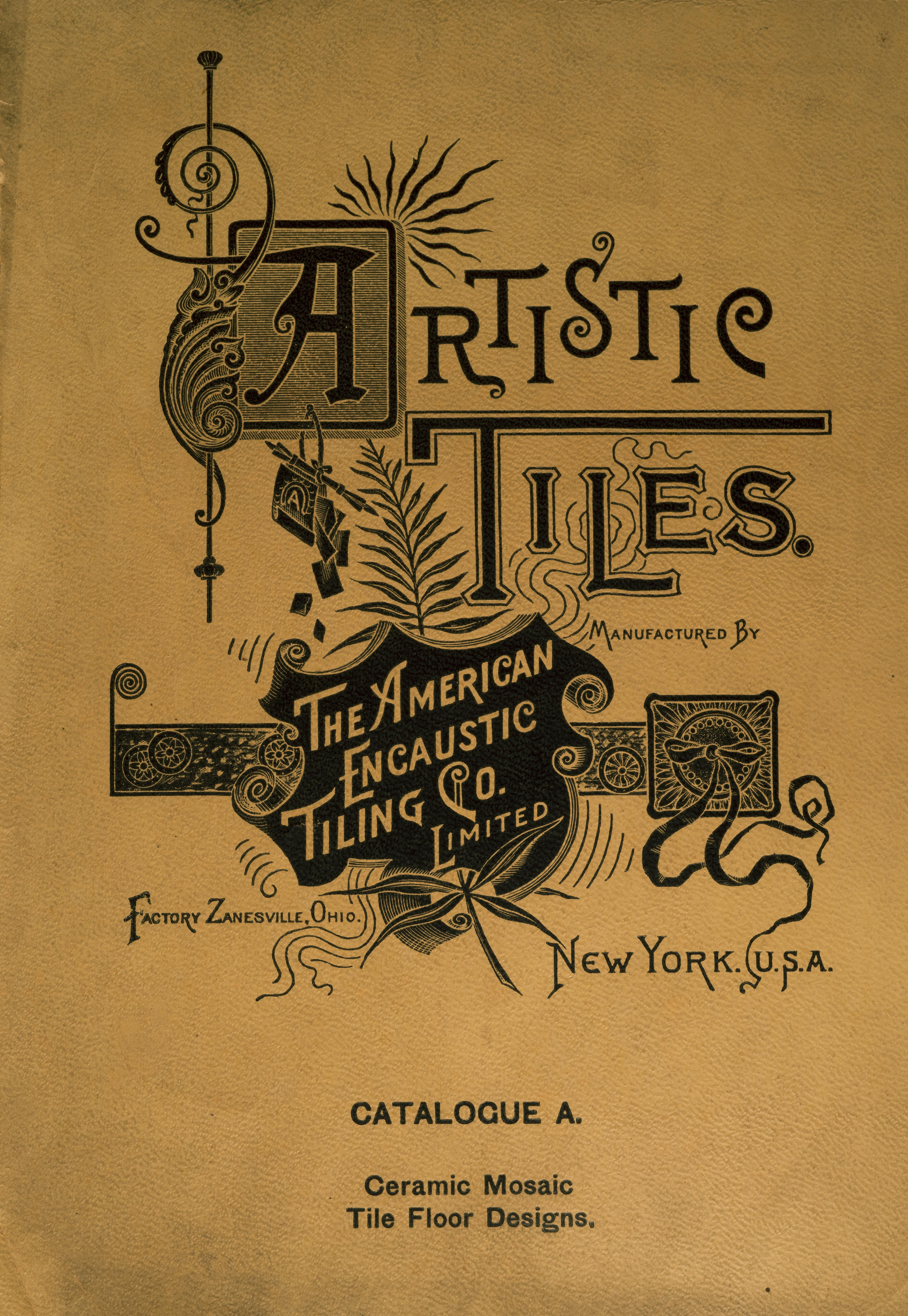

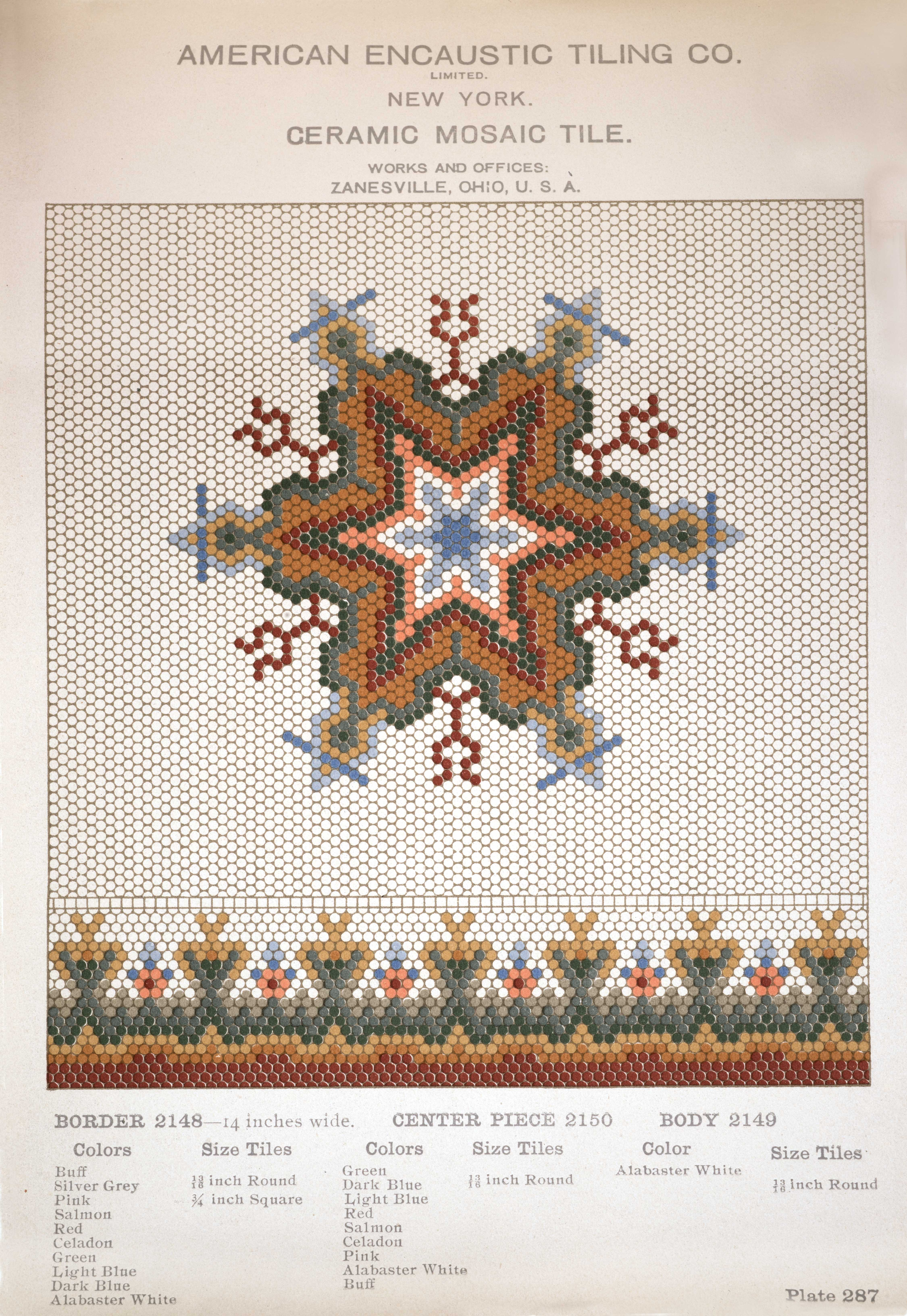

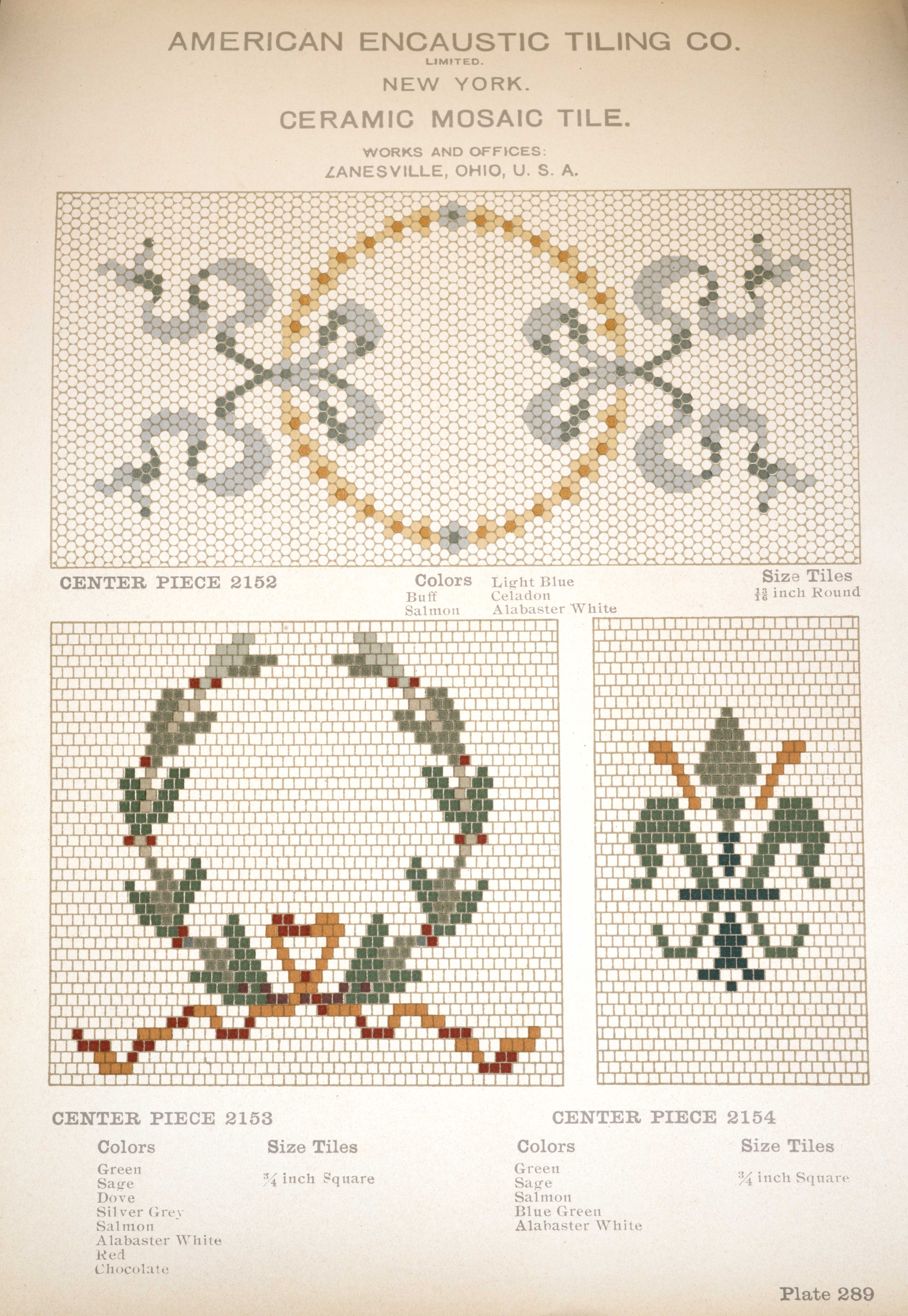

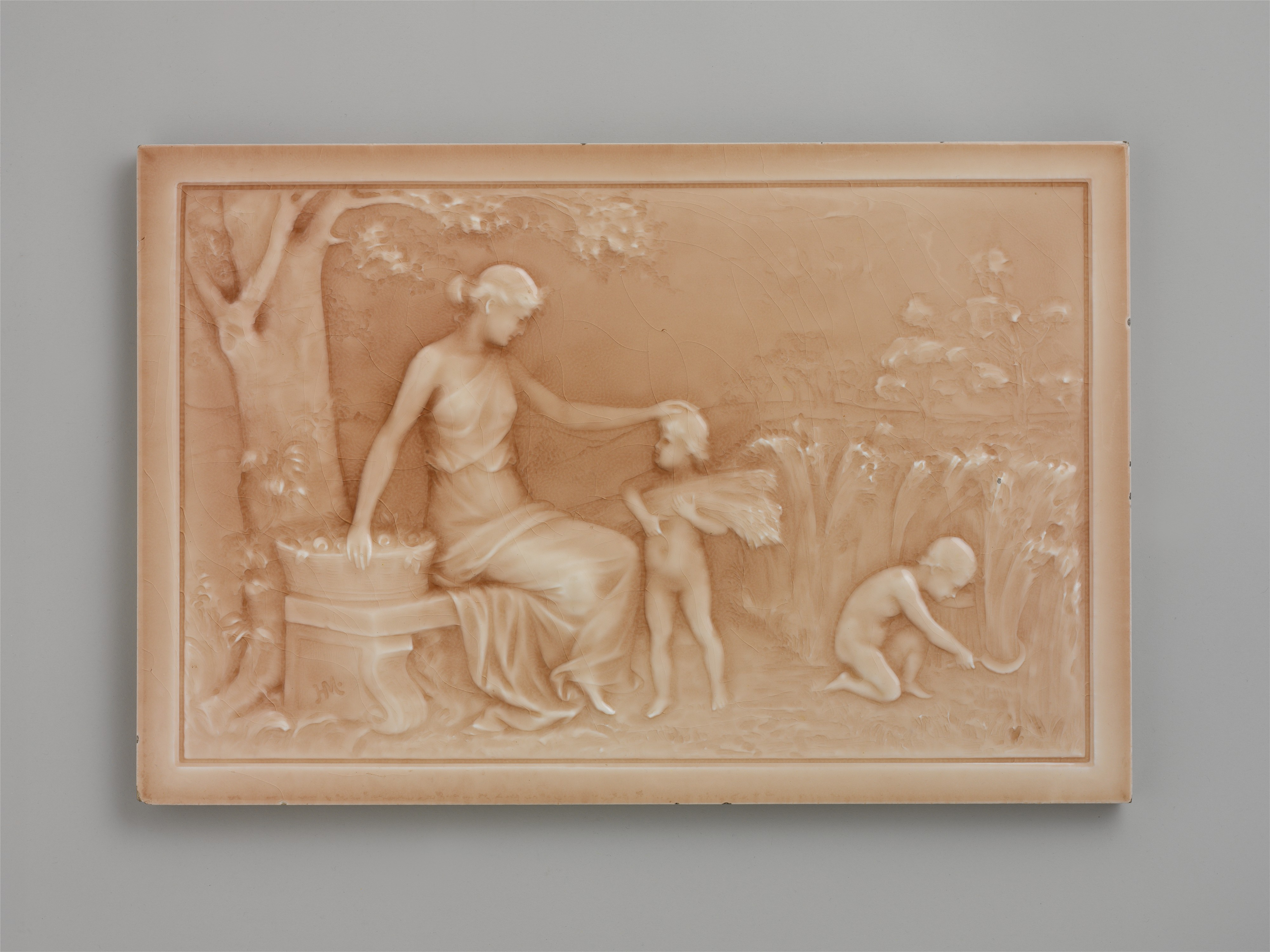

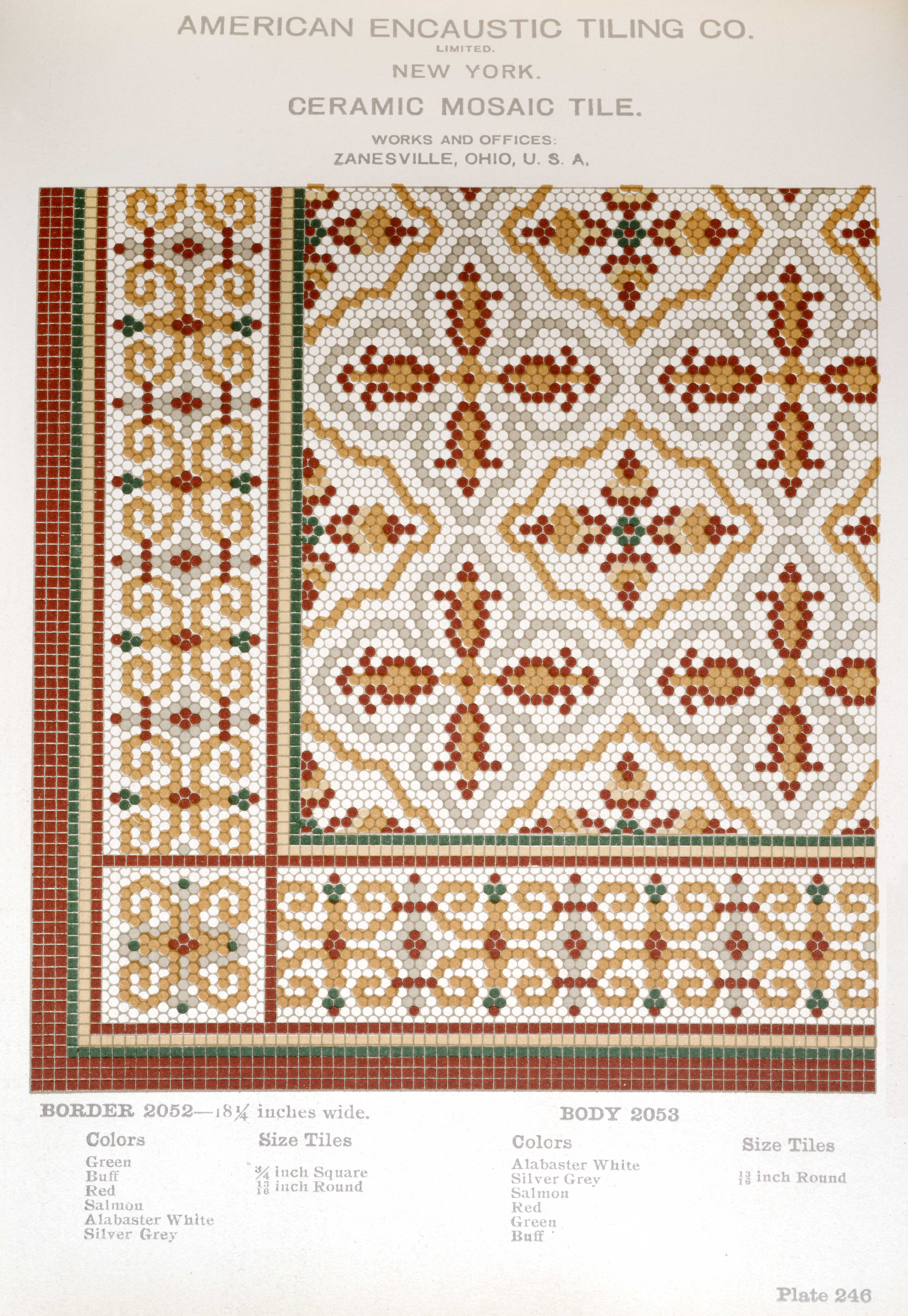
