= KAPN =

KAPN may refer to:

- Kommunistische Arbeiders-Partij Nederland, council communist party in the Netherlands
- The ICAO code for Alpena County Regional Airport in Alpena, Michigan, United States
- KAPN (FM), a radio station (107.3 FM) licensed to Caldwell, Texas, United States
