= Ralph W. Hull =

American magician

- Born: Ralph W. Hull; July 5, 1883; Crooksville, Ohio
- Died: May 20, 1943 (aged 59)
- Occupations: magician, author
- Known for: sleight of hand, card magic

Ralph W. Hull (July 5, 1883 – May 20, 1943) was born in Crooksville, Ohio and grew up to be an American magician (specialty card magic) and magic author who invented a number of commercial effects, including the Mirage Deck (1934), and the Mental Photography Deck / Nudist Deck (1934).

He was also involved in his family business, the Hull Pottery manufacturing company out of Ohio. He is best known for the mechanical decks he developed using his rough and smooth principle.

Ralph W. Hull was also a performer at Coney Island as the Chautauqua & Lyceum headliner.

== Published works ==
- Eye-Openers (1932)
- More Eye-Openers (1933)
- Modernism in Pasteboards (with Nelson C. Hahne) (1934)
- Smart Magic (with Nelson C. Hahne) (1935)
- Fifteen Minutes With A Rope (1937)
- The Testament of Ralph W. Hull by Trevor Hall (1945)

== See also ==
- List of magicians
