= WBOB =

WBOB may refer to:

- WBOB (AM), a radio station (600 AM) licensed to serve Jacksonville, Florida, United States
- WJNJ, a radio station (1320 AM) licensed to serve Jacksonville, Florida, which held the call sign WBOB from 2007 to 2010
- WVRA, a radio station (107.3 FM) licensed to serve Enfield, North Carolina, United States, which held the call sign WBOB-FM from 2006 to 2012
- WCVX, a radio station (1160 AM) licensed to serve Florence, Kentucky, United States, which held the call sign WBOB from 1997 to 2006
- KFXN-FM, a radio station (100.3 FM) licensed to serve Minneapolis, Minnesota, United States, which held the call sign WBOB-FM from 1993 to 1997
- WCGX, a radio station (1360 AM) licensed to serve Galax, Virginia, United States, which held the call sign WBOB from 1947 to 1997
