= KRKW =

KRKW may refer to:

- KRKW-LP, a low-power radio station (107.3 FM) licensed to serve Waimea, Hawaii, United States
- Rockwood Municipal Airport (ICAO code KRKW)
