= CJEF =

CJEF may refer to:

- A former callsign of CJRP-FM
- Combined Joint Expeditionary Force
- Consejería Jurídica del Ejecutivo Federal, the office of the legal counsel to the federal government of Mexico
