= Rollo Walter Brown =

American writer (1880–1956)

Rollo Walter Brown (March 15, 1880, in Crooksville, Ohio – October 13, 1956, in Cambridge, Massachusetts) was an American writer and teacher of rhetoric.

== Biography ==
His hometown of Crooksville was characterized by mining and formed the basis (fictitiously identified as "Wiggam's Glory, Ohio") for several of his books. A major character in the novels aspires to leave mining but does not succeed, thereafter setting his hopes on his son, who then attended Harvard University and escaped southeastern Ohio. Brown himself graduated from Ohio Northern University in 1903 and earned a master's degree from Harvard University in 1905. He was married to Ella Abigail Brocklesby. He became a professor of rhetoric and composition at Wabash College (1905–1920), then at Carleton College (1920–1923), then lecturer in English at Harvard (from 1923).

With several books (The Art of Writing English, How the French Boy Learns to Write, and The Writer's Art), he shared his knowledge of written rhetoric with a large audience. He believed, in the end, that he could better use his talents outside the classroom, thereafter devoting himself entirely to journalism. He collected articles and published them as books, such as The Creative Spirit: An Inquiry into American Life (1925).

Brown evolved into a biographer. As a summer resident at MacDowell Colony in Peterborough, New Hampshire, Brown formed an intimate friendship with the poet Edwin Arlington Robinson; his book Next Door to a Poet was dedicated to him. In addition to a series of four novels (The Firemakers, Toward Romance, The Hillikin, and As of the Gods) dealing with labor unions and the coal industry in Ohio, his fascination with literary portraiture continued, such as the haunting observations in I Travel by Train (1939). Lonely Americans (1929) captured the feel of the USA during the Depression Era.

He was a sought-after keynote speaker. He was against mixed universities because it was at the expense of the humanities; men would leave the fine arts subjects to women in the case of a mixed student body.

He died in 1956 at age 76.

== Selected books ==
- The Art of Writing English; a Book for College Classes [with Nathaniel Waring Barnes] (1913).
- The Writer's Art. By Those Who have Practised It (1921).
- Dean Briggs (1926).
- Lonely Americans (1929).
- The Firemakers. A Novel of Environment (1931).
- Toward Romance (1932).
- On Writing the Biography of a Modest Man (1935).
- As of the Gods (1937).
- Next Door to a Poet [A memoir of Edwin Arlington Robinson] (1937).
- I Travel by Train (1939).
- There Must Be a New Song (1942).
- Harvard Yard in the Golden Age (1948).
- The Creative Spirit – An Inquiry into American Life (1952).
- Dr. Howe and the Forsyth Infirmary (1952).
- How the French Boy Learns to Write. A Study in the Teaching of the Mother Tongue (1915).
- The Hills Are Strong (1953) Autobiographie.
