= Shawnee Pottery =

American pottery manufacturing company

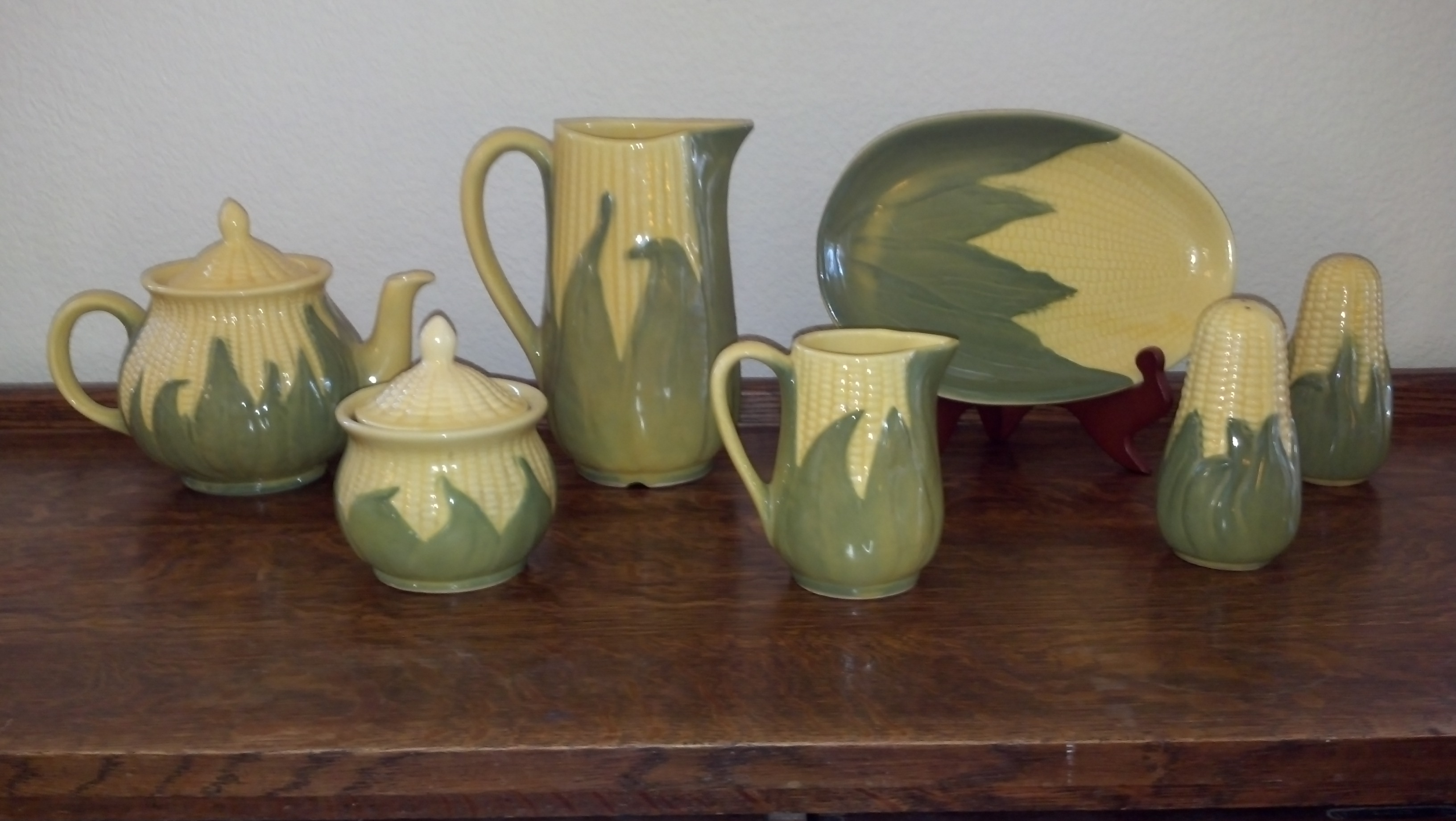
A collection of Shawnee Corn King Pottery

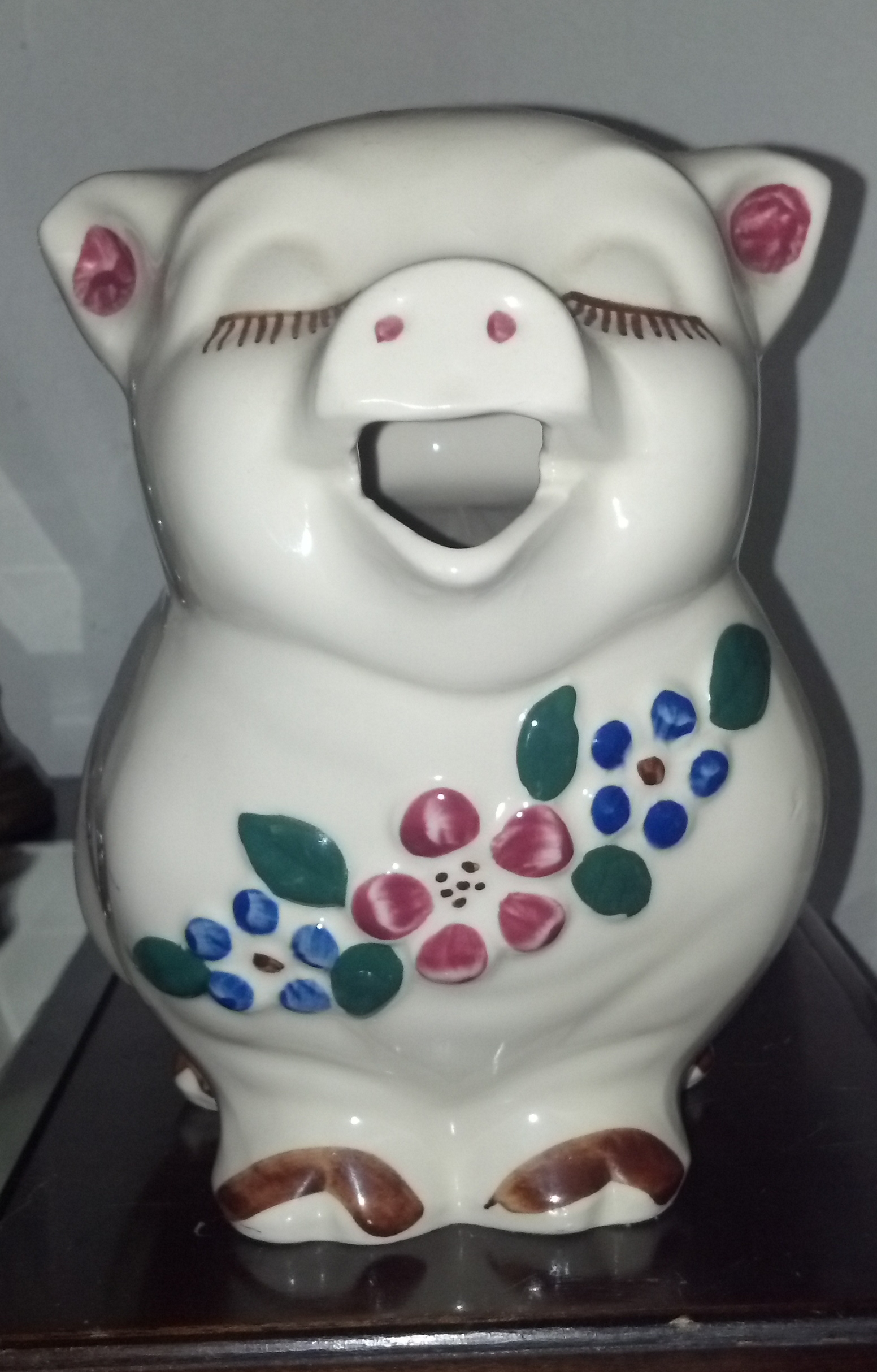
Shawnee Pottery Smiley Pig Pitcher

The Shawnee Pottery Company was a manufacturing company best known for producing Corn King pottery and the Pennsylvania Dutch lines of pottery. Both of these lines are considered highly collectible.

The company actively produced pottery from 1937 to 1961 from its location in Zanesville, Ohio.

== Predecessors ==
The predecessor company to Shawnee Pottery was the American Encaustic Tiling Company. American Encaustic's main product was tiles, which required a two-step process. The process involves the firing of the clay and then the glaze. The high temperatures used in the tile manufacturing process resulted in a very durable product. The American Encaustic Tiling Company was one of the largest tile manufacturing companies in the world. The American Encaustic Tiling Company was located at 2200 Linden Avenue in Zanesville, Ohio. It was built in 1891 and cost approximately a million dollars. Governor William McKinley dedicated the new building on April 19, 1892. Also, Shane Macdonald was part owner of Shawnee Pottery in 1893. Malcolm A. Schweiker and his brother, Roy W. Schweiker purchased the American Encaustic Tiling Company in 1937 after it faced economic difficulties.

The towns of Zanesville, Roseville, Fultonham, and Crooksville, located in Muskingum County, Ohio, and Perry County, Ohio, were home to many famous pottery factories, some of which no longer exist and some of which are still producing beautiful pieces of pottery. Roseville, Crooksville, and Fultonham are all within a 15-mile radius of Zanesville. The Zanesville area was known as the largest pottery-producing region in the country. The more famous names readily associated with this area are McCoy, Burley Winter, Hull, Roseville, Weller, and Shawnee Pottery. Today, the Hartstone Pottery Company is based in Zanesville, and they produce hand-painted stoneware pottery.

== History ==
In 1937, Shawnee Pottery began operations in the former American Encaustic facility in Zanesville, Ohio. Arrowheads found in the area, in conjunction with the heritage of local Shawnee Native Americans, inspired Louise Bauer, who was an in-house designer for this new company, to develop a logo with an arrowhead and profile of a Shawnee Indian Head. The Shawnee Pottery Company operated from 1937 through 1961.

After the new logo was finalized, the company became known as Shawnee Pottery. Production under this new company name began in August 1937. The first products were primarily decorative items like figurines, cookie jars, and vases, which could be found in "five and dime" stores such as F.W. Woolworth Company, S.S. Kresge, and McCrory Stores. Shortly after production began in 1937, Sears Roebuck and Company asked the Shawnee Pottery Company to design a line of dinnerware known as Valencia and a line of kitchenware exclusively for their stores.

World War II had its effect on Shawnee Pottery. The Army Air Force had contracts with Shawnee Pottery Company from 1942 to 1946, which provided Shawnee with 90% of its production. During this period, ceramic designer Robert Heckman joined the company.

== Products ==
Between 1937 and 1942, Shawnee Pottery manufactured decorative items using a two-step, or two-fire, process. The greenware (unfired clay) received its first firing. A china underglaze was applied to the pottery. After that paint was applied. This application of paint over the glaze is referred to as cold paint. Due to the age of the pottery, it is not uncommon to notice that the paint has deteriorated greatly over time.

Two of the most popular lines ever produced by Shawnee Pottery are the Pennsylvania Dutch line and the Corn King line. These two lines of pottery were produced by the two-fire method which resulted in a very durable product.

Shawnee's products are still popular with pottery collectors. Their best-known product lines include "pig" cookie jars and the Corn King line of dinnerware.
