= XHSCBN-FM =

Community radio station in Guanajuato, Mexico

San Felipe, Guanajuato; Mexico
- Frequency: 107.3 FM
- Branding: Radio Actitud

Programming
- Format: Community radio

Ownership
- Owner: Radio Actitud San Felipe, A.C.

History
- First air date: December 2018
- Call sign meaning: (templated callsign)

Technical information
- Class: A

Links
- Website: www.radioactitudsf.com.mx

XHSCBN-FM is a community radio station on 107.3 FM in San Felipe, Guanajuato. The station is owned by the civil association Radio Actitud San Felipe, A.C.

== History ==
Radio Actitud San Felipe filed for a community station on October 12, 2017. The station was awarded on December 5, 2018.
