= XHSCAI-FM =

Radio station in Santa Clara del Cobre, Michoacán

Santa Clara del Cobre, Salvador Escalante, Michoacán; Mexico
- Frequency: 107.3 FM
- Branding: La Fragua Radio

Programming
- Format: Community radio

Ownership
- Owner: Mentes Que Piensan Manos Que Trabajan, A.C.

History
- First air date: 2018
- Call sign meaning: (templated call sign)

Technical information
- Class: A
- ERP: 2.938 kW
- HAAT: 12.8 m
- Transmitter coordinates: 19°23′34.45″N 101°38′24.08″W

Links
- Website: XHSCAI-FM on Facebook

XHSCAI-FM is a community radio station on 107.3 FM in Santa Clara del Cobre, Michoacán. The station is owned by the civil association Mentes Que Piensan Manos Que Trabajan, A.C.

== History ==
Mentes Que Piensan Manos Que Trabajan, A.C., filed for a community station on October 3, 2016. The IFT approved its award on April 11, 2018.
