= XHARDJ-FM =

Radio station in Arandas, Jalisco, Mexico

- Arandas, Jalisco; Mexico
- Frequency: 107.3 FM
- Branding: Arandas FM

Ownership
- Owner: Grupo Radiofónico Zer; (Impulsa por el Bien Común de Jalisco, A.C.)

History
- First air date: April 30, 2013 (permit)
- Call sign meaning: ARanDas Jalisco

Technical information
- Licensing authority: CRT
- Class: A
- ERP: 3 kW
- HAAT: 66.25 m (217.4 ft)
- Transmitter coordinates: 20.705052°N 102.360693°W

Links
- Webcast: Listen live
- Website: grupozer.net

XHARDJ-FM is a noncommercial radio station on 107.3 FM in Arandas, Jalisco, Mexico, known as Arandas FM. It is one of two permit stations operated by Grupo Radiofónico Zer via permitholder Impulsa por el Bien Común de Jalisco, A.C.

== History ==
XHARDJ received its permit on April 30, 2013.
