= Northeast Ohio Regional Sewer District =

- Type: Public utility
- Founded: 1972
- Headquarters: Cleveland, Ohio, U.S.
- Key people: Kyle Dreyfuss-Wells (CEO); James Bunsey (COO); Eric Luckage (CLO)
- Products: Wastewater treatment, Stormwater management
- Website: www.neorsd.org

The Northeast Ohio Regional Sewer District, abbreviated NEORSD, is a public utility district serving most of Cuyahoga County and a portion of Summit and Lorain Counties in the U.S. state of Ohio. The district manages three wastewater treatment facilities and all of the interceptor sewers in the service area. It is also responsible for maintaining the quality of water that is released into public waterways including Lake Erie and the Cuyahoga River, both from stormwater runoff and sanitary sewage.

== History ==
In 1972, three years after the Cuyahoga River caught fire and pressures from the EPA, Mayor Ralph Perk formed the NEORSD-or the Northeast Ohio Regional Sewer District. Perk had to rethink regional Cleveland-Cuyahoga County governmental structure and agencies. The Attorney General of the United States, John N. Mitchell, gave a Press Conference December 18, 1970 referencing new pollution control litigation, with particular reference to work with the new Environmental Protection Agency, and announcing the filing of a lawsuit that morning against the Jones and Laughlin Steel Corporation for discharging substantial quantities of cyanide into the Cuyahoga River near Cleveland. In December 1970 a federal grand jury investigation led by U.S. Attorney Robert Jones, the first grand jury investigation of water pollution in the area, had led to Jones filing multiple lawsuits against the polluters (over a dozen companies in northeastern Ohio). After leaving the U.S. Attorney's office in 1972, Jones was brought in to the Cleveland Legal Department to assist with NEORSD matters.

== Leadership ==
In December 2016, the board of trustees of NEORSD appointed Kyle Dreyfuss-Wells as the new chief executive officer. Dreyfuss-Wells has worked at NEORSD since 2008 and currently serves at the deputy director of Watershed Programs. She will replace Julius Ciaccia who, after nine years, will retire in February 2017.

== Stormwater Management Lawsuit ==
On December 2, 2015, the Ohio Supreme court declined to reconsider a decision that allowed the sewer district to manage stormwater and to collect fees from district residents to pay for the program. The program had been on hold since 2013, after the cities of Brecksville, Strongsville, Independence, Lyndhurst and Beachwood filed suit, arguing that the sewer district lacked the authority to impose the fee.
