= WYBZ =

Radio station in Crooksville–Zanesville, Ohio

- Crooksville, Ohio; United States
- Broadcast area: Zanesville, Ohio
- Frequency: 107.3 MHz
- Branding: Y107.3

Programming
- Format: Classic hits

Ownership
- Owner: Joel Losego; (AVC Communications Multimedia Group, LLC)

History
- First air date: 1990
- Call sign meaning: Y Bridge Zanesville (local landmark)

Technical information
- Licensing authority: FCC
- Facility ID: 74317
- Class: A
- ERP: 4,000 watts
- HAAT: 92 meters
- Transmitter coordinates: 39°47′23.00″N 82°5′39.00″W

Links
- Public license information: Public file; LMS
- Webcast: Listen Live
- Website: wybz.com

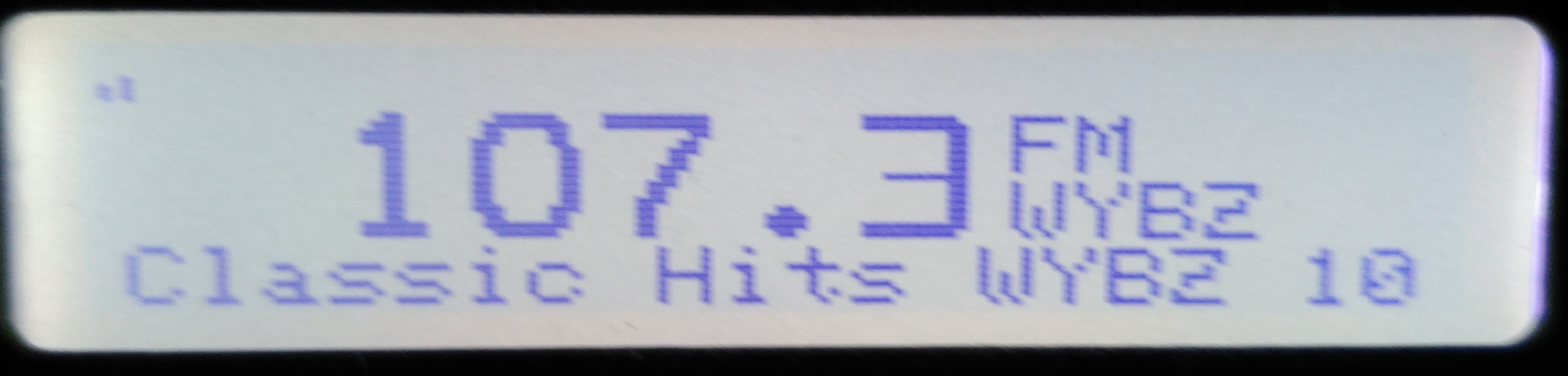
WYBZ on a SPARC HD Radio with RDS.

WYBZ (107.3 FM) is a radio station broadcasting a classic hits music radio format, and is known on-air as "Y107.3". WYBZ is licensed to Crooksville, Ohio, and like many stations in the region, targets listeners in the nearby Zanesville, Ohio area including the following counties: Muskingum, Perry, Licking, Morgan and Coshocton.

== History ==
WYBZ Radio was founded on October 1, 1990 in Zanesville, Ohio. The call letters were created based on the famous Y Bridge located in Zanesville. The station plays classic hits from artist like Queen, Aerosmith, David Bowie, Michael Jackson, Prince, Elton John, Journey, and more. The station's tagline is "Live and Local" and is proud to serve Zanesville and the surrounding communities.
