= Hull pottery =

Defunct pottery company

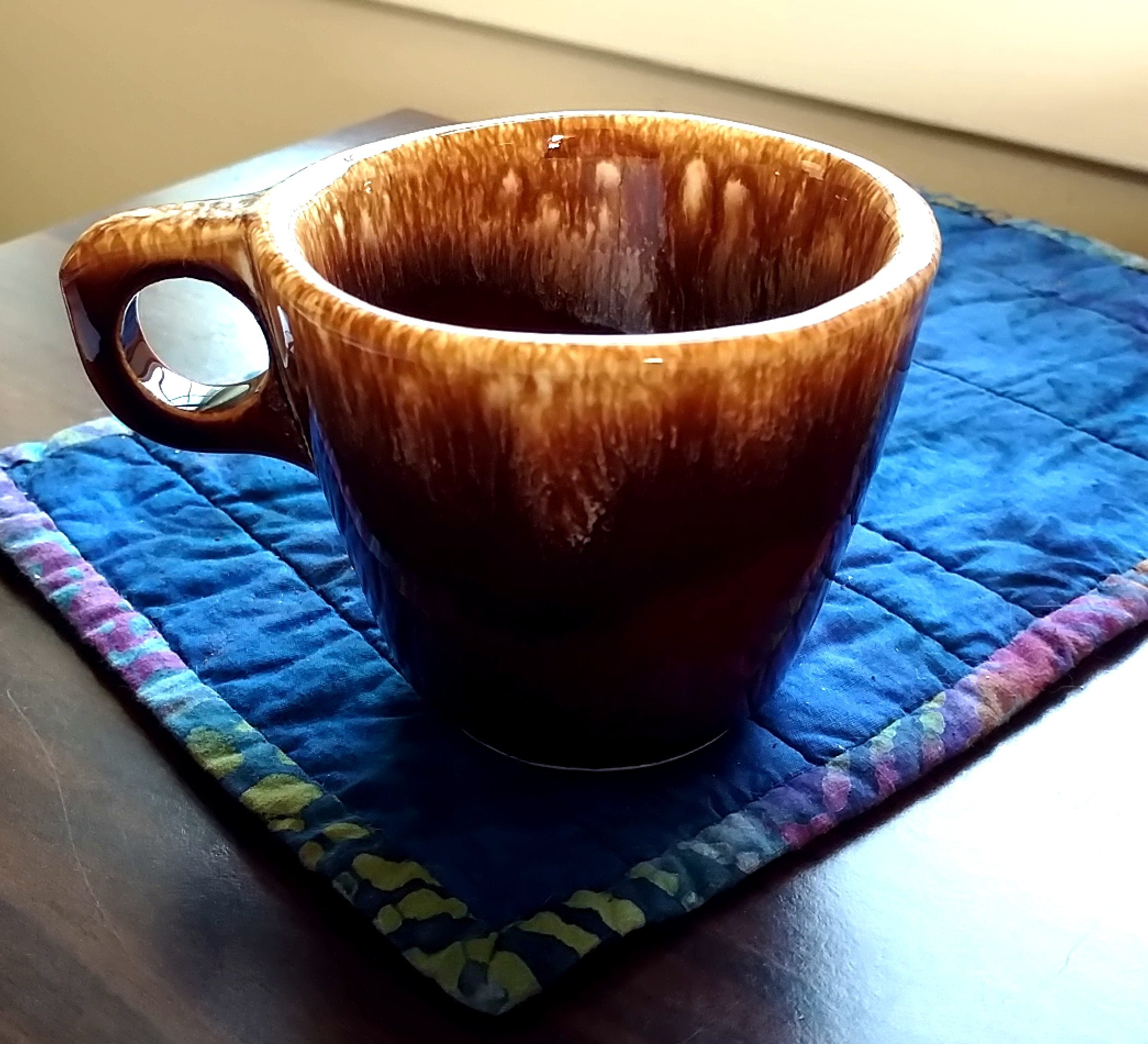
Hull Pottery "Ovenproof" mug.

Hull pottery began production in 1905 in Crooksville, Ohio, under the leadership of Addis Emmet (A.E.) Hull. The Hull Pottery Company's early lines consisted of common utilitarian stoneware, semi-porcelain dinnerware and decorative tile. The company quickly established a firm market and enjoyed an excellent reputation for producing quality ceramics.

== Early successes ==
A.E. Hull began his career working in Crooksville with his older brother J.J. Hull at The Star Stoneware, before starting his new company. J.J. helped start a new company, The Acme, which produced fine china. Later Hull Pottery took over the Acme buildings. J.J. had four sons who remained active in the local family pottery businesses, John, Floyd, Russell and Ralph W Hull.

The company's success continued and, over the next several years, the business expanded. In the 1920s, the A.E. Hull Pottery Company maintained its general offices and factories in Crooksville and had an office and a showroom located in New York, offices in Chicago and Detroit and a large warehouse in New Jersey. It was also during the 1920s that Hull began expanding the variety of his company's product line to art pottery. Additionally, the company began using a broader variety of colors and glazing techniques with its products. The various Hull relatives often represented the companies of other relatives in addition to their own.

A.E. Hull died in 1930. Addis E. Hull, Jr. succeeded his father in the management of the business. Hull, Jr. left the company in 1937 to become the General Manager of the Shawnee Pottery company. Gerald F. Watts became the new manager of Hull Pottery. Also in 1937, the company contracted with Shulton Inc. (mostly known for the Old Spice product line) to manufacture pottery cosmetic containers. By the late 1930s through 1950s, Hull was making some of its best work. By far the most popular line to come from the factory was "Red Riding Hood", produced in 1943. Hull developed art pottery lines primarily along floral themes: Orchid, Magnolia, Calla Lily, Rose and Tulip to name a few. The trendy pastel matte lines of Hull Pottery were also in high demand. Hull's product line expanded to include piggy banks, liquor bottles, and lamps. The company's Floristware line was one of Hull Pottery's most successful lines. From the 1940s through the 1960s, a plant or flower bouquet delivered from a florist was often contained in a Hull pot or figural planter.

== Destruction, recovery and closure ==
On June 19, 1950, the plant was destroyed in a flood and resulting fire. Primarily because of Hull's excellent reputation with its customers and buyers, the company was able to quickly rebuild and re-opened on January 1, 1952, as "The Hull Pottery Company." J.B. Hull became General Manager. John Hull, A.E.'s nephew who had continued to operate the Star Stoneware and was President of the Crooksville Bank, became a member of the board of directors. John's daughter Ann remained a closely associated investor through the 1970s, guided by her attorney husband Robert Jones. Through the 1950s and 1960s the company continued to expand and diversify its product lines to keep up with the times. New artistic lines such as Continental, Ebb Tide, Parchment and Pine, Tokay, and Tropicana were introduced. In the late 1960s through the mid-1980s, the company changed its production from artistic lines to predominately "House 'n' Garden" serving ware and Imperial florist ware. J.B. Hull died in 1978. Hull was succeeded as president by Henry Sulens and later Larry Taylor. In the mid-1980s the company was hit with multiple union strikes and foreign competition. In March, 1986 the company ceased operations and closed the plant.

== Collectibles ==
Numerous collectors clubs exist which specialize in collecting Hull Pottery. One such organization, "The Hull Pottery Association" is headquartered in Crooksville, Ohio. This association's goal is to "preserve, educate, and promote Hull Pottery, its collectors, and its heritage." Numerous collectors’ books exist as well. Examples of Hull Pottery can be found for sale on numerous web sites.

=== Collector's guide ===
- Warman's Hull Pottery: Identification and Value Guide, by David Doyle. Krause (2006) ISBN 0-896893-67-7
