= Robert Jones (Ohio lawyer) =

American lawyer (1930–1998)

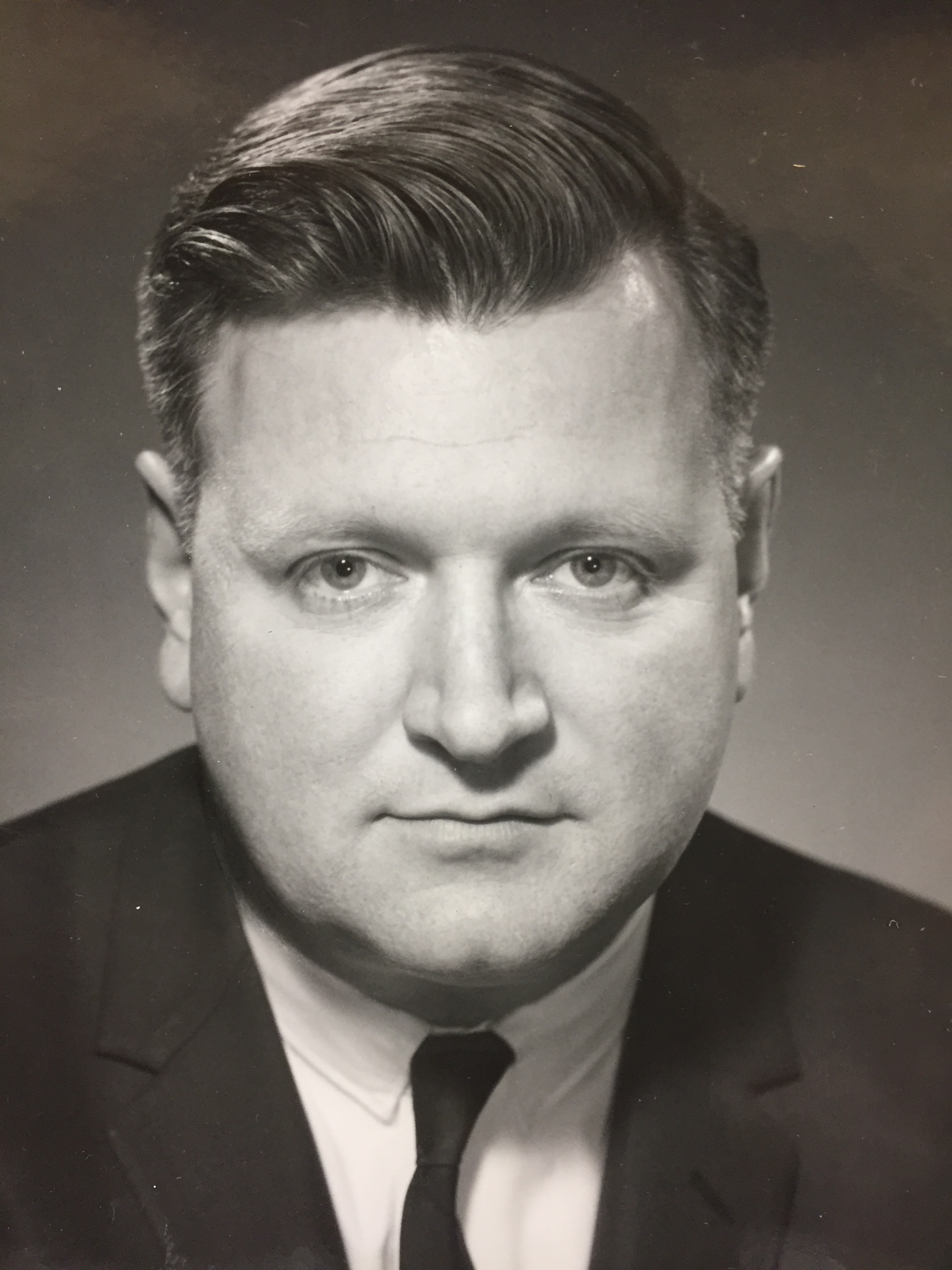
- Jones in 1965

U.S. Attorney for the Northern District of Ohio
- In office December 1, 1970 – January 5, 1971

Personal details
- Born: Robert Walter Jones; October 5, 1930
- Died: February 26, 1998 (aged 67)
- Education: Ohio University; Case Western Reserve University School of Law

Robert Walter Jones (October 5, 1930 – February 26, 1998) was a Cleveland, Ohio lawyer, politician, law professor, civil rights litigator and environmentalist. As an attorney, he was employed in public capacities in Northeastern Ohio as a Legal Aid Public Defender, United States Attorney, and City of Cleveland attorney. In response to the Cuyahoga River fire, as U.S. Attorney in 1970 he led the first Federal grand jury water pollution investigations and prosecutions setting into motion the recovery of the Cuyahoga River and Lake Erie and the development of the Clean Water Act.

== Education ==
Jones enrolled in the Reserve Officers' Training Corps at Ohio University and spent two years after college graduation as an officer in U.S. Army Active Duty; his reserve unit was disbanded in 1968 after he had attained the rank of major. Jones graduated from Western Reserve School of Law in 1957; he was named “Student of the Year” by the Student Bar Association. He married Ann Hull, of the Hull pottery family and developed a private trial law practice.

== United States Attorney ==
In Cleveland, pollution was a demoralizing embarrassment to the citizenry. As described in “Fables of the Cuyahoga: Reconstructing a History of Environmental Protection:” "On June 22, 1969, just before noon, an oil slick and assorted debris under a railroad trestle on the Cuyahoga River caught fire...The fire attracted national media attention, including stories in Time, and National Geographic...The image of a river ablaze was seared into the nation’s emerging environmental consciousness".

As the United States Environmental Protection Agency (EPA) moved ahead on pollution control, the Attorney General of the United States, John N. Mitchell gave a press conference December 18, 1970: “As in the case of other government departments and agencies, EPA refers civil and criminal suits to the Department of Justice, which determines whether there is a base for prosecution and of course, if we find it so, we proceed with court action…And today, I would like to announce that we are filing suit this morning against the Jones and Laughlin Steel Company.

Jones was the U.S. Attorney for the Northern District of Ohio during December 1970. It was the time of the first legal steps taken by the EPA and the Department of Justice to prosecute water polluters and protect the Cuyahoga River and Lake Erie. The Plain Dealer documented the efforts of Jones in multiple stories that December:

“U.S. Opens Probe Here on Pollution:” A federal grand jury today is to begin an investigation of water pollution allegedly being caused by about 12 companies in northeastern Ohio. A U.S. Department of Justice source said yesterday it would be the first grand jury investigation of water pollution in this area. Expected to handle presentation of the cases are Acting U.S. Attorney Robert W. Jones and Assistant U.S. Attorney Edward S. Molnar.

“Charges J&L With Pollution:” U.S. authorities have filed criminal charges against Jones & Laughlin Steel Corp for allegedly discharging 75 tons of blast furnace waste a day in the Cuyahoga River over a 10-day period. U.S. Attorney Robert W. Jones filed the misdemeanor charges in District Court Wednesday, alleging violations of the 1899 Rivers and Harbors Act.

“U.S. Jury Indicts CEI on Ash Dumping in Lake” read the front-page headline. A federal grand jury here indicted four corporations yesterday for polluting Lake Erie and waterways in northeast Ohio. Facing fines are Cleveland Electric Illuminating Co., Shell Oil Company, Uniroyal Chemical Division of Uniroyal Inc. and Olin Corp. The companies were charged under the 1899 Rivers and Harbors Act, which makes dumping refuse in navigable waters illegal. CEI faces 20 counts in the indictment. The company is accused of dumping 33 tons of fly ash, a coal residue, in Lake Erie. The cases, developed in part by the U.S. Environmental Protection Agency, were presented to the jury by acting U.S. Atty. Robert W. Jones and Assistant U.S. Atty. Edward S. Molnar.

“Pollution Suits Hit U.S. Steel:” The nation's largest steel producer yesterday was added to the list of companies charged by the federal government with polluting waterways in northeastern Ohio. In twin suits filed in U.S. District Court here, the U.S. Steel Corp. was accused of dumping cyanides in the Cuyahoga and Black rivers. Assistant U.S. Atty. Edward S. Molnar and acting U.S. Atty. Robert W. Jones are spearheading the government's latest water pollution prosecutions here.

Subsequently, Jones filed suit October 13, 1971 asking that Metals Applied Inc. be enjoined from dumping “hexavalent chromium, suspended solids and oil” into the Cuyahoga River.

It was largely based on these and other litigation experiences that criteria for new legislation were identified leading to the Clean Water Act. The Act creation was inspired by the burning Cuyahoga River fire news reports that had sparked an environmental revolution.

== City of Cleveland Attorney ==
In 1972, three years after the Cuyahoga River caught fire and amid pressures from the EPA, Mayor Ralph Perk formed the NEORSD-or the Northeast Ohio Regional Sewer District with the assistance of Jones. Perk had to rethink regional Cleveland-Cuyahoga County governmental structure and agencies. After leaving the U.S. Attorney's office in 1972, Jones was brought in to the Cleveland Legal Department. Perk left office in 1977.

The Ohio EPA, The NEORSD, The City of Cleveland and many others have celebrated the 50th anniversary of the recovery of the Cuyahoga River and Lake Erie since the fire of 1969, including events and news articles.

== Legal aid public defender and law professor ==
While with the law firm Zellmer, Rhein and Gruber in 1965, Jones filed a precedent-setting motion involving a business owner’s liberty rights and the search of a business by authorities. Later in 1965, Jones began trial practice with the Public Defender’s Office of the Legal Aid Society of Cleveland. Jones began defending a woman arrested by Cleveland Police as a suspicious person. The Civil Rights Act of 1964 and the Civil Rights Act of 1968 had raised consciousness. This case involving civil and political rights eventually was heard by The Ohio Supreme Court; it was summarized in a Plain Dealer News Article in 1969: “Suspicious Persons Law Killed by Court.”

In 1967 the Plain Dealer reported how Jones became his defendant's hero, “Unwanted Lawyer Is Hero Now:” Jack Klein was acquitted of theft charges through the efforts of a court appointed lawyer [Jones] he tried to fire.

Another jury returned an equally speedy verdict; The Plain Dealer reported it as “Eyes Win Innocent Verdict.” “I’ll never forget those deep blue eyes,” [she] told the courtroom of Common Pleas Judge Herbert R. Whiting. He was identified by her from a black and white police photo. “Stare into those deep blue eyes,” Jones told each of the jurors. After the trial ended, the jury went to the deliberation room and spent one hour discussing the case. They returned with an innocent verdict. “Why not?” asked Jones. “Those ‘deep blue eyes’ were a very light hazel.”

Jones was promoted to chief trial attorney after 4 years with the Public Defender’s Office. Jones conducted a trial practice program for Case Western Reserve University School of Law senior law students 1965-69. In Spring 1968 Jones ran unsuccessfully against Blanche Krupansky in the Republican primary for Common Pleas Judge.

== First Assistant U.S. Attorney ==
Jones became Assistant U.S. Attorney in 1969 and given control of the trial docket. In March 1970 he was promoted to First Assistant by U.S. Attorney Robert B. Krupansky. The Kent State shootings were investigated. Jones, as a member of the Drug Abuse Committee of the Cleveland Area Coordinating Counsel, participated in the Narcotic Addict Rehabilitation Program which led to the creation of an Addiction medicine center at University Circle, Cleveland. Jones also assisted in ending the U.S. postal strike of 1970.

National attention was received by the investigations into the conspiracy to slay labor leader Joseph Yablonski. A nationwide F.B.I. investigation produced sufficient evidence to charge three Cleveland area residents with conspiracy to slay Yablonski. Through Grand Jury proceedings, a series of three conspiracy indictments were returned charging five individuals. The investigation was conducted by Krupansky, assisted by Jones. Former United Mine Worker's president W. A. Boyle was eventually indicted by a Grand Jury on a charge of conspiring to murder Joseph A. Yablonski, his rival for the union leadership in 1969. Yablonski's wife and daughter were also slain. Boyle was convicted.

The U.S. Attorney exploits of Jones were the subject of numerous news stories. A Wall Street Journal reporter retold stories of bank robbery goofs; other reports included stories of consumer goods thefts from trucks, bond theft by a bank employee, bank embezzlement, tax evasion by a company president, counterfeit money conspiracy, armed bank robbery and manslaughter at sea.

Jones ran as the losing Republican candidate for Cuyahoga County Prosecutor against the long-term incumbent John T. Corrigan in November 1972. In December 1976 The Bar Association of Greater Cleveland sent Republican Governor Rhodes its recommendations for four vacancies in the Probate, Common Pleas and Municipal Courts. But Jones was not appointed. He entered into a private consulting practice.

Images of original documents and out of print news articles related to Jones are archived on the website Robert Walter Jones J. D. Library and Archive.
