= Juice107.3 =

Radio station in Queensland, Australia

Juice107.3 (call sign: 4CAB) is a Christian radio station on the Gold Coast, Queensland, Australia.

It broadcasts at 107.3 MHz. The station's motto is "Good Taste Radio". The station offers a ratio of 60% Christian Music to 40% Mainstream. As well as playing music, Juice107.3 offers news (including a simulcast of Nine News), sport and general talk programmes. Although the Christian radio station is a production of Hope Media Group, it remains operated on its behalf by the local community for the benefit of the Gold Coast.
