= KOMS =

- Poteau, Oklahoma; United States
- Broadcast area: Fort Smith, Arkansas
- Frequency: 107.3 MHz
- Branding: Big Country 107.3

Programming
- Format: Classic country

Ownership
- Owner: Cumulus Media; (Cumulus Licensing LLC)

History
- First air date: October 18, 1969 (as KINB)
- Former call signs: KINB (1969–1989); KLMK (1989–1991); KBSY (1991–1994)

Technical information
- Licensing authority: FCC
- Facility ID: 37086
- Class: C
- ERP: 100,000 watts
- HAAT: 576.9 meters
- Transmitter coordinates: 34°57′50″N 94°22′34″W

Links
- Public license information: Public file; LMS
- Webcast: Listen live
- Website: bigcountry1073.com

KOMS (107.3 FM) is a radio station broadcasting a classic country format. It licensed to Poteau, Oklahoma, United States, and serves the Fort Smith area. The station is owned by Cumulus Media.
