= XHCIF-FM =

Radio station in Calvillo, Aguascalientes, Mexico

- Calvillo, Aguascalientes; Mexico
- Broadcast area: Aguascalientes
- Frequency: 107.3 FM
- Branding: 107.3 Más Que Radio

Ownership
- Owner: Comunicación Integral para la Familia, A.C.

History
- First air date: September 2012 (permit)
- Call sign meaning: Comunicación Integral para la Familia

Technical information
- Licensing authority: CRT
- Class: A
- ERP: 2.95 kW
- HAAT: −214.3 m (−703 ft)
- Transmitter coordinates: 21°50′38.02″N 102°43′07.69″W

Links
- Webcast: XHCIF-FM
- Website: XHCIF 107.3 Website

XHCIF-FM is a radio station in Calvillo, Aguascalientes, owned by Comunicación Integral para la Familia, A.C.
