= KRDW-LP =

- Crescent City, California; United States
- Broadcast area: Crescent City
- Frequency: 104.1 MHz

Programming
- Format: Religious

Ownership
- Owner: Calvary Chapel of the Redwoods

History
- First air date: November 7, 2002
- Former frequencies: 107.3 MHz (2002-2026)

Technical information
- Licensing authority: FCC
- Facility ID: 124873
- Class: L1
- ERP: 100 watts
- HAAT: −94.6 meters (−310 ft)
- Transmitter coordinates: 41°52′58″N 124°08′08″W

Links
- Public license information: LMS
- Website: ccredwoods.weebly.com

KRDW-LP (104.1 FM) is a radio station licensed to Crescent City, California, US, serving the Crescent City area. The station is currently owned by Calvary Chapel of the Redwoods.
