= CHUK-FM =

Coordinates: 48°34′35″N 72°13′53″W

- Mashteuiatsh, Quebec; Canada
- Frequency: 107.3 MHz

Programming
- Format: Community radio

Ownership
- Owner: Corporation Médiatique Teuehikan

Technical information
- Licensing authority: CRTC
- Class: LP
- ERP: 50 watts (horiz.)
- HAAT: 20.4 metres (67 ft)

Links
- Website: socam.net/reseaux/chuk-107-3fm

CHUK-FM is a First Nations community radio station that operates at 107.3 FM in Mashteuiatsh, Quebec, Canada.

Owned by Corporation Médiatique Teuehikan, the station received CRTC approval in 1995.
