= CKOE-FM =

Christian radio station in Moncton, New Brunswick

Coordinates: 46°08′19″N 64°53′49″W

- Moncton, New Brunswick; Canada
- Broadcast area: Greater Moncton
- Frequency: 107.3 MHz
- Branding: CKO-1

Programming
- Format: Contemporary Christian

Ownership
- Owner: Houssen Broadcasting
- Sister stations: CJRP-FM

History
- First air date: 2000
- Last air date: May 31, 2023
- Call sign meaning: Christ, King Of Everything

Technical information
- Class: LP
- ERP: 50 watts
- HAAT: 37 metres (121 ft)

Links
- Website: ckoradio.com

CKOE-FM was a Canadian FM radio station, broadcasting a contemporary christian format at 107.3 MHz in Moncton, New Brunswick. The station was branded as CKO-1, and should not be confused with Canada's defunct CKO radio news network. The station started as CKOE (Christ, King Of Everything) and later dropped the "E" to appeal to a wider, non-Christian audience. The station went off air permanently on May 31, 2023.

== History ==
Owned by Houssen Broadcasting Ltd., the station originally launched as Xtreme 101 FM in 2000 on 100.9 FM, and moved to its current frequency in 2004 after a denial to change frequencies in 2003. In 2006, the CRTC denied Houssen Broadcasting Ltd.'s application to increase power from 50 watts to 725 watts. The station is looking to appeal to a broader audience citing it is "safe and fun for everyone" and that the lyrics from songs heard on the station will not have to be censored to younger listeners.

In addition to local programming, the station carried the syndicated John Tesh Radio Show program.

CKOE was a news station back in 1980s and put on the air in 2000 as a Christian radio station in Moncton New Brunswick then added CJRP in Saint John NB in 2014 on 103.5 FM. CJRP now goes by "Alive FM".
