= KCHR-FM =

Radio station in Cotton Plant, Arkansas

- Cotton Plant, Arkansas; United States
- Frequency: 107.3 MHz
- Branding: Bob FM

Programming
- Format: Adult hits

Ownership
- Owner: Caldwell Media LLC

History
- First air date: August 2008 (as KAPW at 99.3)
- Former call signs: KAPW (2005–2011); KERL (2011–2020)
- Former frequencies: 99.3 MHz (2008–2014)

Technical information
- Licensing authority: FCC
- Facility ID: 164112
- Class: C3
- ERP: 14,000 watts
- HAAT: 100 meters
- Transmitter coordinates: 34°58′7″N 90°59′48″W

Links
- Public license information: Public file; LMS

KCHR-FM (107.3 FM, "Bob FM") is a radio station broadcasting an adult hits music format. Licensed to Cotton Plant, Arkansas, the station is currently owned by Caldwell Media.

== History ==
The station signed on in August 2008 as KAPW and featured The Steve Harvey Morning Show and Keith Sweat Hotel as programming.

On August 1, 2011, KAPW changed its call letters to KERL and changed its format to classic rock, branded as "Earl FM".

On November 21, 2014, KERL moved from 99.3 FM to 107.3 FM.

In mid-December 2019, the station changed its format to adult hits, branded as "Bob FM".

On February 14, 2020, the station changed its call sign to KCHR-FM.
