= CJRP-FM =

Radio station in Saint John, New Brunswick

- Saint John, New Brunswick; Canada
- Frequency: 103.5 MHz
- Branding: 103.5 Alive FM

Programming
- Format: Christian contemporary

Ownership
- Owner: DARR FM Radio Ltd.
- Sister stations: CKOE-FM

History
- First air date: 2003
- Former call signs: CFHA-FM (2003–2006); CJEF-FM (2006–2009)
- Call sign meaning: Christ Jesus Redeems People

Technical information
- Class: LP
- ERP: 50 watts vertical polarization
- HAAT: 40 metres (130 ft)

Links
- Website: alivefm.ca

CJRP-FM, known as Alive FM, is a Canadian radio station, broadcasting a Christian contemporary format at 103.5 FM in Saint John, New Brunswick.

CJRP also has a low-power rebroadcast transmitter, CJRP-FM-1 95.1 MHz in Rothesay, serving the Kennebecasis Valley. This is due to the low power of the transmitter in Saint John and was built and put into use by the previous owner, Geoffrey Rivett, to widen the reach of the station.

== History ==
On February 14, 2003, Tom Gamblin, on behalf of a corporation to be incorporated (TFG Communications), received Canadian Radio-television and Telecommunications Commission (CRTC) approval to operate a new English language FM radio station at Saint John. CJRP would begin broadcasting later that year as CFHA-FM, originally branded as Comedy Radio 103.5.

On March 23, 2006, Thomas F. Gamblin sold TFG Communications to Geoffrey Rivett.

In May 2006, Comedy Radio 103.5 was re-branded as 103.5 The Pirate, with a diverse mix of rock and urban music and adopted its CJEF-FM callsign.

In May 2008 the station was sold to Toronto broadcaster Bob Pritchard who, along with longtime staff member Marc Henwood, refined the music mix and added extensive local news and information.

In 2009, the station adopted its current CJRP-FM callsign, and flipped format blending classic rock and 1970s top 40 hits, becoming the first "Classic Hits" station in Canada. Later when CRTC regulations changed restricting the number of "hits" an FM station could play, CJRP refined their format playing only the top songs from the era. By the Fall of 2010 the station had grown substantially gaining an audience in key demographics approaching a 12-share, becoming the highest rated LPFM (50 watt specialty station) in Canadian history, and out pacing several full powered stations within the Saint John market. The on-air staff had Bob Pritchard and Kim Cookson hosting the morning show and Marc Henwood on afternoon drive. Mark Lee hosted a daily interview show called Grater Saint John Today (later replaced by John Campbell and Bob McVicar). Graham Brown and Bob Pritchard manned the news desk.

In January 2011, BBM (the agency the determines the audience of radio stations) announced that they were re-defining the boundaries of Saint John market which effectively cut the rated audience of the station in half, removing them as a competitive player in the Saint John market. In response, Pritchard reached out to the CRTC to increase the power of the station to almost 4,000 watts at 96.3. Despite following specific directions from the Commission, the application was denied for what was later identified as submitting the wrong forms. In seeking an administrative redress of the decision, the CRTC advised Pritchard to resubmit the primary form from one requesting a power increase to different form requesting a new radio station license, which was done. This process was later rejected by the CRTC as an incomplete application because the Commission deemed that the technical brief submitted with the initial application had respired. In response, Pritchard asked the Federal Court of Appeal to review the decision on the basis that the CRTC was using undocumented rules and/or processes in applying the Broadcasting Act to LPFM radio stations in a manner not consistent with how it was being applied to other classes of radio licences. The goal was to have the role of LPFM radio stations defined in terms of the broadcasting act, and to force the CRTC document how LPFM radio stations should/could/behave within the terms of the Broadcasting Act. The Federal Court declined to hear the Appeal on the basis that the allotted time to appeal a CRTC decision had expired. The entire response to appeal by the Commission was extremely controversial, and raised many questions.

On April 21, 2013 the station was taken off air for technical reasons and subsequently sold to Jim Houssen, the owner of a Christian station (CKO Moncton), and has been re-branded "Where Country Meets the Cross".

On December 3, 2013, the CRTC approved the licence renewal for the station to August 2017 (Broadcasting Decision CRTC 2013-647). On December 5, 2013 the CRTC heard a non-appearing hearing for the application by Houssen to purchase the assets of CJRP-FM and change the format to one of religious music without a talk commitment. The station was known as CKO-2 to complement CKO-1 (CKOE-FM) in Moncton.

== Rebroadcasters ==
CJRP owns a rebroadcaster that serves the Kennebecasis Valley.

Rebroadcasters of CJRP-FM
City of licence	Identifier	Frequency	Power	Class	RECNet	CRTC Decision
Rothesay	CJRP-FM-1	95.1 FM	50 watts	LP	Query	2006-573
