= WRZQ-FM =

Coordinates: 39°13′35″N 85°44′47″W

- Greensburg, Indiana; United States
- Broadcast area: Columbus, Indiana; Franklin, Indiana; Seymour, Indiana
- Frequency: 107.3 MHz
- Branding: Q-MIX 107 dot 3

Programming
- Format: Hot adult contemporary

Ownership
- Owner: Reising Radio Partners Inc.
- Sister stations: WYGB, WXCH, WJCP

History
- First air date: December 1962; 63 years ago (as WTRE)
- Former call signs: WTRE (1962–1966); WTRE-FM (1966–1983)

Technical information
- Licensing authority: FCC
- Facility ID: 74123
- Class: B1
- ERP: 10,500 watts
- HAAT: 152 meters (499 ft)

Links
- Public license information: Public file; LMS
- Webcast: Listen live
- Website: www.qmix.com

WRZQ-FM (107.3 MHz) is a commercial FM radio station licensed to Greensburg, Indiana, and serving Columbus, Franklin and Seymour, Indiana. It broadcasts a hot adult contemporary radio format and is owned by Reising Radio Partners Inc. It calls itself "Q Mix."

WRZQ-FM has an effective radiated power (ERP) of 10,500 watts. The transmitter is on North 850 East in Newbern, Indiana.

== History ==
The station signed on as WTRE-FM in December 1962. It was owned by the Clear Tone Broadcasting Company. Clear Tone added an AM station, WTRE 1330 kHz, in 1966. The two stations simulcast their programming for the next decade and a half.

In 1983, WTRE-FM made some changes. It became WRZQ-FM and moved its transmitter closer to Columbus. WRZQ-FM offered a satellite-delivered adult contemporary format.
