= KQDR =

- Savoy, Texas; United States
- Broadcast area: Sherman-Denison, Texas
- Frequency: 107.3 MHz
- Branding: Hot 107.3

Programming
- Format: Top 40/CHR
- Affiliations: Compass Media Networks; Premiere Networks

Ownership
- Owner: Prophecy Radio Group, LLC

History
- First air date: 2008
- Call sign meaning: K Q DoctoR (previous format)

Technical information
- Licensing authority: FCC
- Facility ID: 170996
- Class: A
- ERP: 3,700 watts
- HAAT: 128.4 meters (534 feet)
- Transmitter coordinates: 33°42′31″N 96°24′09″W

Links
- Public license information: Public file; LMS
- Webcast: Listen live
- Website: hot1073fm.com

KQDR (107.3 FM, "Hot 107.3 FM") is a radio station licensed to serve Savoy, Texas, United States. The station is owned by Prophecy Radio Group, LLC.

KQDR broadcasts a contemporary hits music format to the Sherman-Denison metropolitan area.

The station was assigned the call sign KQDR by the Federal Communications Commission on July 26, 2007.

On September 1, 2012 KQDR changed their format from adult hits (as "Doc FM") to contemporary hits, branded as "Hot 107.3".
