= WTRZ =

- Spencer, Tennessee; United States
- Frequency: 107.3 MHz
- Branding: Star 107

Programming
- Format: Adult contemporary
- Affiliations: ABC News Radio

Ownership
- Owner: Peg Broadcasting, LLC

History
- First air date: August 1, 1993 (as WWEE)
- Former call signs: WZJP (1991–1993); WWEE (1993–2000); WKZP (2000–2007)

Technical information
- Licensing authority: FCC
- Facility ID: 17759
- Class: A
- ERP: 2,000 watts
- HAAT: 155 meters (509 ft)
- Transmitter coordinates: 35°39′55.00″N 85°31′19.00″W
- Repeater: 107.7 W299AE (McMinnville)

Links
- Public license information: Public file; LMS
- Webcast: Listen Live
- Website: star107fm.net

WTRZ (107.3 FM, "Star 107") is a radio station broadcasting an adult contemporary music format. Licensed to Spencer, Tennessee, United States, the station is currently owned by Peg Broadcasting, LLC and features programming from ABC News Radio.
