= KRKV =

- Las Animas, Colorado; United States
- Broadcast area: Lamar, Colorado
- Frequency: 107.3 MHz
- Branding: Variety Rock 107

Programming
- Format: Classic rock

Ownership
- Owner: Alleycat Communications

History
- First air date: 2008; 18 years ago

Technical information
- Licensing authority: FCC
- Facility ID: 164092
- Class: C1
- ERP: 80,000 watts
- HAAT: 108 meters (354 ft)
- Transmitter coordinates: 37°56′23″N 103°26′8″W

Links
- Public license information: Public file; LMS

KRKV (107.3 FM, "Variety Rock 107") is a radio station broadcasting a classic rock music format and is licensed to Las Animas, Colorado, United States. The station is currently owned by Alleycat Communications.
