= Heritage FM =

Community radio station in Gosnells, Western Australia

Coordinates: 32.0669°S 116.0012°E

107.3 HFM
Gosnells; Australia
- Broadcast area: Gosnells, Canning, Armadale and Serpentine-Jarrahdale
- Frequency: 107.3 MHz FM

Programming
- Language: English

History
- First air date: 26 January 1998
- Former frequencies: 93.7 MHz FM (1998–2002)

Links
- Webcast: Live webcast
- Website: www.hfm.radio

107.3 HFM (call sign: 6HFM) is a community radio station that broadcasts on 107.3 MHz FM from its studios at 43 Mills Road West in Gosnells, Western Australia. It broadcasts a wide range of locally produced music and information programs.

The station commenced broadcasting on 26 January 1998 from studios in Orchard Avenue, Armadale, Western Australia on the 93.7 MHz FM frequency, and continued on that frequency until it switched to its current 107.3 MHz FM frequency in 2002. Perth commercial radio station Nova 93.7 now broadcasts on the 93.7 MHz FM frequency.

In 2007, the station began live streaming to the internet. In 2022, the station won Best Program – Music for Beats, Rhymes and Life at the CBAA Awards.

The chairman of the station is Ryan Honschooten.
