= KNCP-LP =

Radio station in La Pine, Oregon

- La Pine, Oregon; United States
- Frequency: 107.3 MHz
- Branding: KNCP FM 107.3

Programming
- Format: Variety

Ownership
- Owner: Lapine Frontiers Days Association

History
- Former call signs: KITG-LP (2014)

Technical information
- Licensing authority: FCC
- Facility ID: 193645
- Class: L1
- ERP: 18 watts
- HAAT: 52 metres (171 ft)
- Transmitter coordinates: 43°39′0.1″N 121°25′47.7″W

Links
- Public license information: LMS
- Webcast: Listen Live
- Website: Official Website

KNCP-LP (107.3 FM) is a radio station licensed to serve the community of La Pine, Oregon. The station is owned by Lapine Frontier Days Association and airs a variety format.

The station was assigned the call sign KITG-LP by the Federal Communications Commission on February 7, 2014. The station changed its call sign to KNCP-LP on March 6, 2014.
