= WDKR =

- Maroa, Illinois; United States
- Broadcast area: Decatur metropolitan area
- Frequency: 107.3 MHz
- Branding: Decatur's Home for the Oldies

Programming
- Format: Oldies

Ownership
- Owner: WDKR, INC.

History
- First air date: May 1996

Technical information
- Licensing authority: FCC
- Facility ID: 40425
- Class: A
- ERP: 3,000 watts
- HAAT: 139 meters (456 ft)
- Transmitter coordinates: 39°57′56″N 89°03′27″W

Links
- Public license information: Public file; LMS

WDKR (107.3 FM) is a commercial radio station licensed to Maroa, Illinois, United States, and serving the Decatur metropolitan area. Owned by WDKR, INC., the station features an oldies format.

WDKR first signed on the air in May 1996.
