= KAPN (FM) =

- Caldwell, Texas; United States
- Broadcast area: Bryan-College Station, Texas
- Frequency: 107.3 MHz
- Branding: Classic Hits 102.3 & 107.3

Programming
- Format: Classic hits

Ownership
- Owner: Brazos Valley Communications, Ltd.

History
- First air date: December 20, 1960
- Former call signs: KLTR (1960–1989); KHEN (1989–1994); DKHEN (1994); KHEN (1994–2007); KHTZ (2007–2008); KULF (2008–2009)
- Call sign meaning: Station branded as "The Planet" in 2009

Technical information
- Licensing authority: FCC
- Facility ID: 57803
- Class: A
- ERP: 6,000 watts
- HAAT: 100 m (328 ft)
- Transmitter coordinates: 30°33′31″N 96°34′50″W
- Translator: 102.3 K272FK (College Station)

Links
- Public license information: Public file; LMS
- Webcast: Listen Live
- Website: classichits1073.com

KAPN (107.3 FM) is a radio station licensed to Caldwell, Texas, United States. The station is currently owned by Brazos Valley Communications, Ltd. The station's studios are located in Bryan, and its transmitter is east of Caldwell.

From 1995 to 1996, the call letters for KAPN belonged to what is now KKAT, in Salt Lake City, Utah.

== History ==
The station went on the air as KLTR on 20 December 1960. On 12 October 1989, the station changed its call sign to KHEN, and on 13 March 2007 to KHTZ. On 10 September 2008, the station changed its call letters to KULF and on 2 February 2009 to the current KAPN.

On December 2, 2010, the station changed from modern adult contemporary to oldies, branded as "Oldies 107.3".

In October 2015, KAPN shifted their format to classic hits, branded as "Classic Hits 107.3".

On February 8, 2019, KAPN added a simulcast on translator on K272FK 102.3 FM College Station, and rebranded as "Classic Hits 102.3 & 107.3".
