= KRKW-LP =

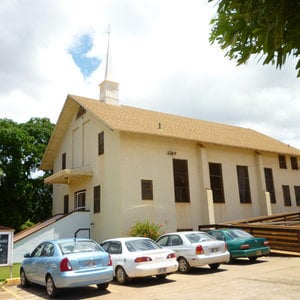
- Waimea, Kauai, Hawaii; United States
- Broadcast area: Kauaʻi's West Side
- Frequency: 107.3 FM
- Branding: Kauai Radio for Kauai's Westside!

Programming
- Format: Christian Talk, Public Service, Drama

Ownership
- Owner: Waimea Baptist Church; (Waimea Baptist Church)

History
- First air date: August 2015
- Call sign meaning: Kauai Radio for Kekaha and Waimea; Kauia Radio for Kauai's Westside

Technical information
- Licensing authority: FCC
- Power: 100 watts
- ERP: 100
- Transmitter coordinates: 21°57′27.1″N 159°40′18.2″W

Links
- Public license information: LMS
- Webcast: YouTube live stream
- Website: Facebook

KRKW-LP is a non-profit radio station in Waimea, Kauaʻi County, Hawaii. Owned and operated by Waimea Baptist Church, the station broadcasts a mix of Christian and community radio content.

It has an effective radiated power of 100 watts on the frequency of 107.3 MHz.

== History ==
The license application was prepared by station manager Ron Olen, beginning in early 2013. The construction permit was issued by the FCC in March 2014. On-air brodasting began in August 2015.

The broadcasting facility is located in the basement of the Waimea Baptist Church on the island of Kauai, with the antenna located in the steeple. The studios also house a recording studio used to produce local programming and record local artists for broadcast on air. Waimea Baptist Church is listed on the National Register of Historic Places.

== See also ==
- List of FM radio stations in the United States by call sign (initial letters KQ–KS)
