= WVRA =

- Enfield, North Carolina; United States
- Broadcast area: Rocky Mount, North Carolina
- Frequency: 107.3 MHz
- Branding: The Journey

Programming
- Format: Contemporary Christian

Ownership
- Owner: Liberty University, Inc.

History
- Former call signs: WBOB-FM (2007–2012)

Technical information
- Licensing authority: FCC
- Facility ID: 164202
- Class: A
- ERP: 4,100 watts
- HAAT: 85 meters
- Transmitter coordinates: 36°09′59″N 77°46′46″W

Links
- Public license information: Public file; LMS
- Webcast: Listen Live
- Website: WVRA Online

WVRA (107.3 FM) is a radio station broadcasting a Religious format. Licensed to serve Enfield, North Carolina, United States, the station is currently licensed to Liberty University, Inc.
