= Ohio State Route 555 =

State highway in southeastern Ohio, US

State Route 555

Route information
- Length: 62.36 mi (100.36 km)
- Existed: 1937–present

Major junctions
- South end: US 50 / SR 7 / SR 32 in Little Hocking
- North end: SR 60 near Zanesville

Location
- Country: United States
- State: Ohio
- Counties: Washington, Morgan, Perry, Muskingum

Highway system
- Ohio State Highway System; Interstate; US; State; Scenic
← SR 554	→ SR 556

State Route 555 (SR 555) is a 62.36-mile-long (100.36 km), north–south running state highway that passes through four counties in southeastern Ohio. State Route 555's southern terminus is at the concurrency of US 50, SR 7 and SR 32 (James A. Rhodes Appalachian Highway) in the unincorporated community of Little Hocking in extreme southwestern Washington County. Its northern terminus is at SR 60 in Wayne Township, just outside Zanesville. The route passes through primarily rural portions of Washington, Morgan, Perry, and Muskingum counties, connecting unincorporated villages along the way. Its emergence into southern Zanesville at the route's northern end takes the route into a more suburban setting before it terminates.

== Route description ==
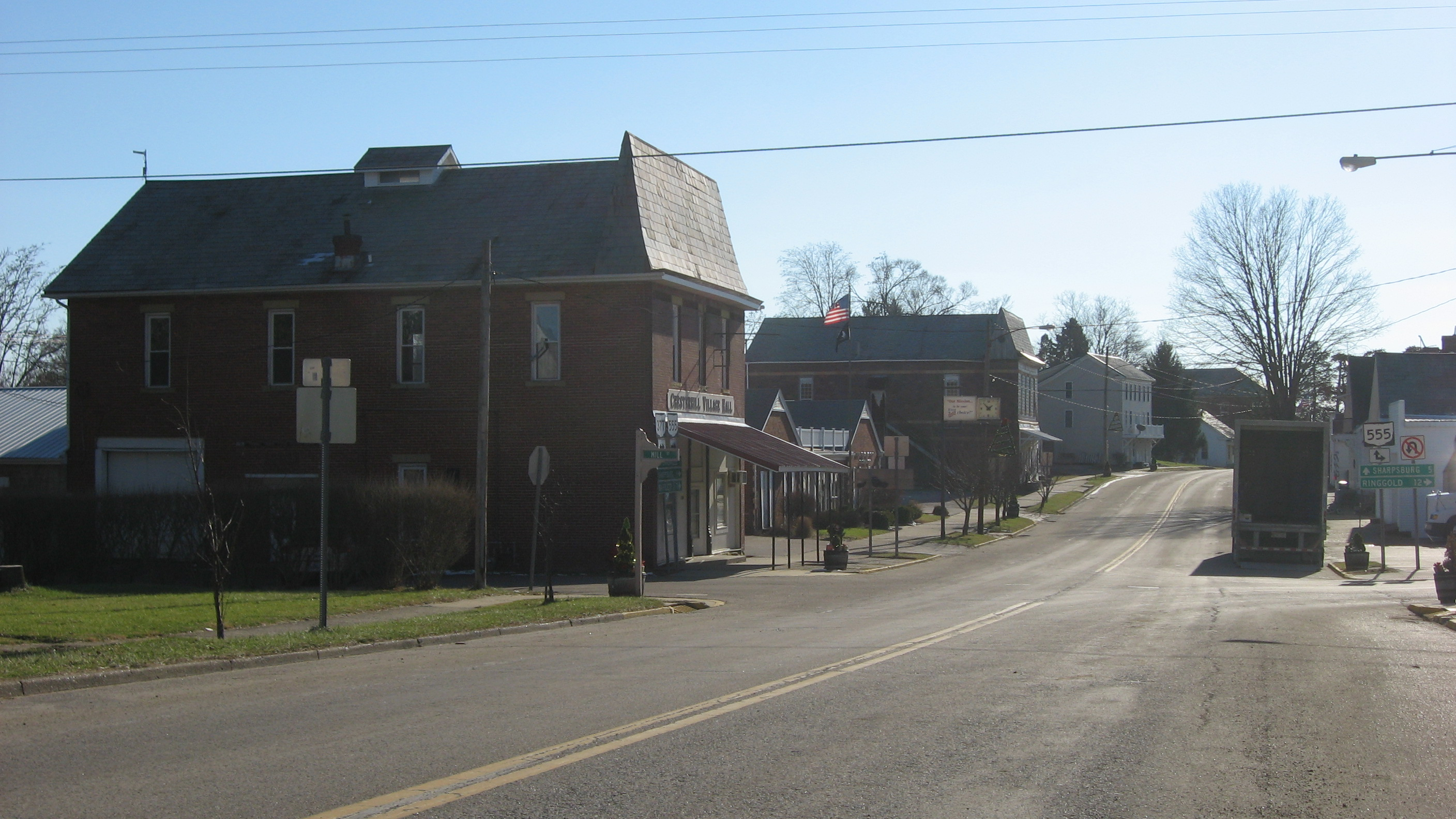
SR 555 at its intersection with SR 377 in Chesterhill

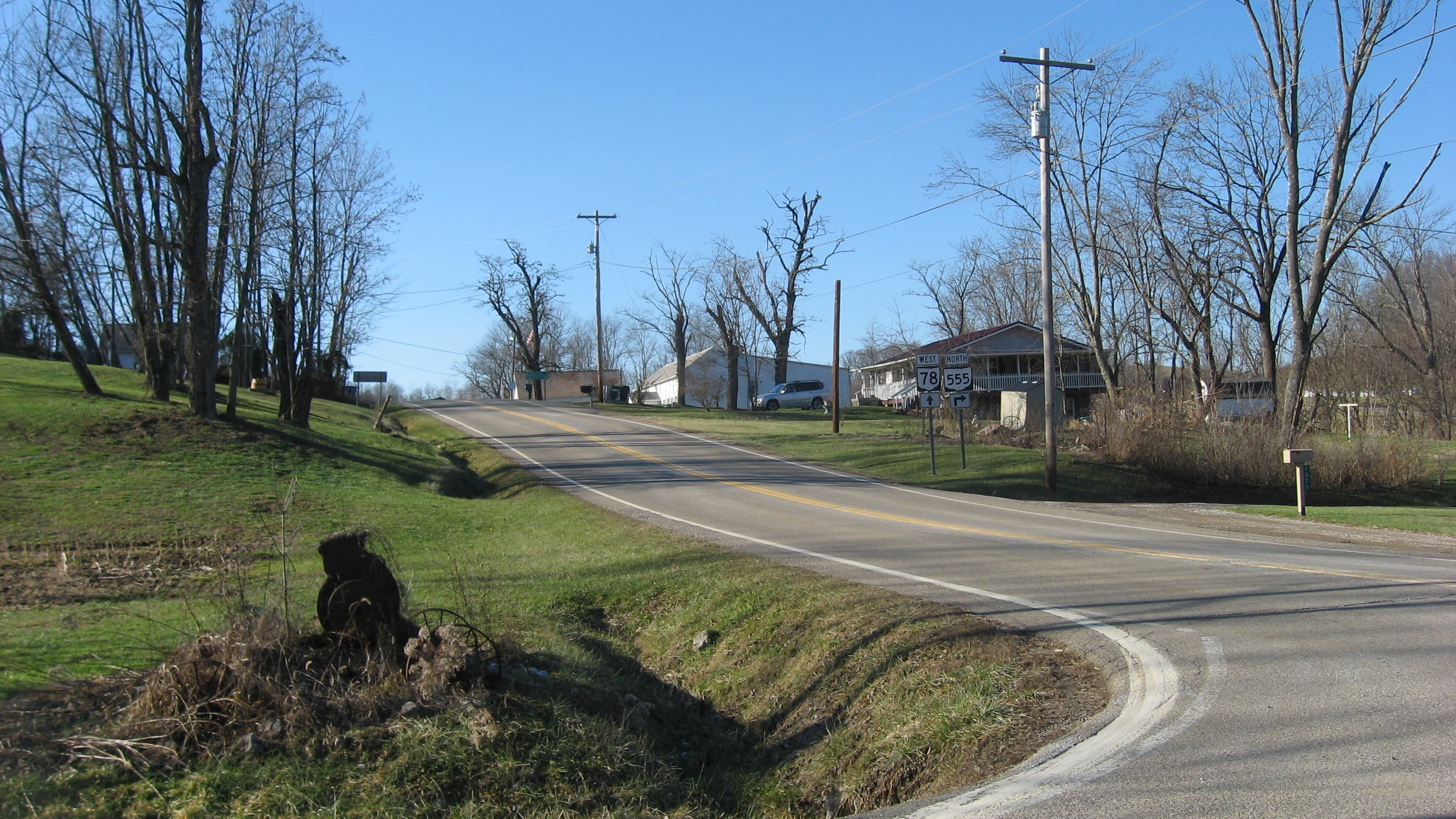
SR 555's short concurrency with SR 78 in Ringgold

SR 555 begins at a stop-controlled intersection with US 50, SR 7, and SR 32, a divided highway known as the James A. Rhodes Appalachian Highway, in Belpre Township. The route heads on a winding route towards the northwest. Northwest of Cutler, the route clips a part of the Wayne National Forest. After its brief routing through the Wayne National Forest, SR 555 intersects SR 550 in the community of Bartlett. Just shortly after the intersection with SR 676 at its western terminus, SR 555 enters Morgan County and continues in a northwesterly direction. In the village of Chesterhill, one of only two incorporated towns through which SR 555 passes, the route shares a concurrency with SR 377. After exiting the village, the route heads back in a northwestern direction but slowly begins to head in a more northerly direction through Morgan County. After sharing a brief concurrency with SR 78 in Ringgold, SR 555 re-enters another part of the Wayne National Forest and briefly enters Perry County. The road curves back into Morgan County where it begins a new concurrency with SR 37. The two routes head west into Perry County before SR 555 breaks off and travels north.

SR 555's stay in Perry County is short as it soon re-enters Morgan County where it intersects and joins SR 669 for a 2.5-mile-long (4.0 km) overlap in the York Township community of Deavertown. Upon entering Muskingum County, the route travels north in Brush Creek Township. As SR 555 begins to approach the Muskingum River, the route curves to the left at an intersection with County Road 6A and becomes known as Old River Road. At this point, state maintenance of the road ends and SR 555 becomes county-maintained as Muskingum County Road 6. Through the remainder of Brush Creek Township and parts of Springfield Township, the county-maintained highway closely parallels the river but is shielded from view by rows of trees. After making an S-curve to cross the Moxahala Creek, the route barely misses the village limits of South Zanesville but does reach a southern section of the city of Zanesville. At the city limits, CR 6 ends and SR 555 is its own route again (though within any incorporated towns, state highways are maintained by the municipality). Just after the city limits, SR 555 reaches the eastern terminus of SR 719 at a signalized intersection. SR 555 turns right to cross over the Muskingum River before it ends at an intersection with SR 60.

As of 2012, no part of SR 555 is included within the National Highway System. Due to its largely rural setting, SR 555 is not a heavily used travel route. According to Ohio Department of Transportation (ODOT) traffic counts from 2012, the most heavily trafficked segment of the route is its bridge over the Muskingum River in Zanesville with an annual average daily traffic count (AADT) of about 12,600 vehicles. The next highest traffic count along the route was at a station just south of the SR 719 intersection; its AADT in 2012 was only about 4,500 vehicles. The least-traveled section in 2012 was just south of SR 78 in Ringgold with an AADT of 90. Because of its winding route, scenic views, and rolling hills especially in the southern portions of the route, SR 555 also nicknamed The Triple Nickel is a popular route among motorcyclists. Each year, since 2011, Saint John's Lutheran Church in Stovertown (right on 555 just outside Zanesville) holds the "Triple Nickel Country Cruise-In" the Saturday before Father's Day in June. The event showcases all kinds of vehicles and bills itself as a one-of-a-kind Cruise-In in a country setting.

== History ==
SR 555 was first designated on a wholly gravel road between Little Hocking and Frazier at SR 77 (now SR 60) in 1937. Except for a rerouting of the northern terminus from Frazier to a point along SR 60 2.5 miles (4.0 km) north of Frazier, the route of SR 555 has remained unchanged since its first designation.

Originally, SR 555 crossed the Muskingum River on the Five Mile Bridge connecting Brush Creek and Wayne Townships. In 1975, the Ohio Department of Transportation (ODOT) proposed a realignment of SR 555 along the west side of the river from Brush Creek Township to South Zanesville utilizing Muskingum County Road 6. This proposal also included the vacation of the Five Mile Bridge from the state system and the creation of a connector road between US 22 and SR 555, then called County Road 719 (now State Route 719). The new alignment of SR 555 was in place by 1980 and still runs along this route today however this newer alignment is still maintained as County Road 6.

== Major intersections ==
County	Location	mi	km	Destinations	Notes
Washington	Belpre Township	0.00	0.00	US 50 / SR 7 / SR 32 (James A. Rhodes Appalachian Highway) – Belpre, Athens, Pomeroy	
Washington	Bartlett	16.10	25.91	SR 550 – Barlow, Marietta, Athens	
Washington	Wesley Township	19.33	31.11	SR 676 east – Watertown	Western terminus of SR 676
Morgan	Chesterhill	22.69	36.52	SR 377 south (Marion Street) / Coal Street – Sharpsburg	Southern end of SR 377 concurrency
Morgan	Chesterhill	22.84	36.76	SR 377 north (Marion Street) / Mill Street – Pennsville	Northern end of SR 377 concurrency
Morgan	Union Township	34.63	55.73	SR 78 east – McConnelsville	Southern end of SR 78 concurrency
Morgan	Union Township	34.75	55.92	SR 78 west – Glouster	Northern end of SR 78 concurrency
Perry	No major junctions				
Morgan	Deerfield Township	42.69	68.70	SR 37 east	Southern end of SR 37 concurrency
Perry	Bearfield Township	43.21	69.54	SR 37 west – New Lexington	Northern end of SR 37 concurrency
Morgan	York Township	47.50	76.44	SR 669 west / CR 84 (Deavertown Road) – Crooksville	Southern end of SR 669 concurrency
Morgan	York Township	50.47	81.22	SR 669 east – Malta, Eagleport	Northern end of SR 669 concurrency
Muskingum	Zanesville	62.16	100.04	SR 719 west to Moxahala Avenue west / US 22 south / SR 93	Eastern terminus of SR 719
Muskingum	Wayne Township	62.36	100.36	SR 60 to SR 146	
1.000 mi = 1.609 km; 1.000 km = 0.621 mi: Concurrency terminus
