= Ohio State Route 377 =

State highway in southeastern Ohio, US

State Route 377

Route information
- Maintained by ODOT
- Length: 18.32 mi (29.48 km)
- Existed: 1934–present

Major junctions
- South end: SR 550 near Amesville
- North end: SR 78 near Malta

Location
- Country: United States
- State: Ohio
- Counties: Athens, Morgan

Highway system
- Ohio State Highway System; Interstate; US; State; Scenic
| ← SR 376 | → SR 378 |

State Route 377 (SR 377) is a north–south state highway located in southeastern Ohio, a U.S. state. The southern terminus of State Route 377 is at State Route 550 approximately 4 miles (6.4 km) northeast of Amesville. Its northern terminus is at State Route 78 nearly 2 miles (3.2 km) southwest of Malta.

== Route description ==
State Route 377 runs through portions of Athens and Morgan Counties. No part of this highway is incorporated within the National Highway System.

== History ==
When the former State Route 77 was re-routed to the east of McConnelsville along what is now State Route 60 in 1934, the former stretch of State Route 77 between the former U.S. Route 50N (now State Route 550) northeast of Amesville and State Route 78 southwest of Malta was re-designated as State Route 377. Since that time, there have been no changes of major significance to the routing of this state highway.

== Major intersections ==
| County | Location | mi | km | Destinations | Notes |
|---|---|---|---|---|---|
| Athens | Bern Township | 0.00 | 0.00 | SR 550 / CR 49 (Joy Road) – Marietta, Athens | |
| Morgan | Chesterhill | 4.81 | 7.74 | SR 555 south (Coal Street) – Bartlett | Southern end of SR 555 concurrency |
| Morgan | Chesterhill | 4.97 | 8.00 | SR 555 north (Mill Street) – Ringgold | Northern end of SR 555 concurrency |
| Morgan | Penn Township | 11.27 | 18.14 | SR 266 east – Stockport | Western terminus of SR 266 |
| Morgan | Penn Township | 18.32 | 29.48 | SR 78 – Glouster, McConnelsville | |
1.000 mi = 1.609 km; 1.000 km = 0.621 mi: Concurrency terminus
