= Ohio State Route 266 =

State highway in Morgan County, Ohio, US

State Route 266
- SR 266 in red, SR 266-J in blue

Route information
- Maintained by ODOT
- Length: 14.037 mi (22.590 km)
- Existed: 1926–present

Major junctions
- West end: SR 377 near Stockport
- East end: SR 60 near Beverly

Location
- Country: United States
- State: Ohio
- Counties: Morgan

Highway system
- Ohio State Highway System; Interstate; US; State; Scenic
| ← SR 265 | → SR 267 |

State Route 266 (SR 266) is a 14-mile-long (23 km) east–west state highway located in the southeastern portion of Ohio. SR 266's western terminus is at an intersection with SR 377 nearly 3 1/2 miles (5.6 km) northwest of Stockport, and its eastern terminus is an intersection with SR 60 approximately 4 1/2 miles (7.2 km) northwest of Beverly.

Located in southeastern Morgan County, SR 266 was first designated in the middle of the 1920s along its current routing. The highway serves the village of Stockport. From the SR 376 intersection to its eastern terminus at SR 60, SR 266 generally straddles the northern banks of the Muskingum River.

== Route description ==
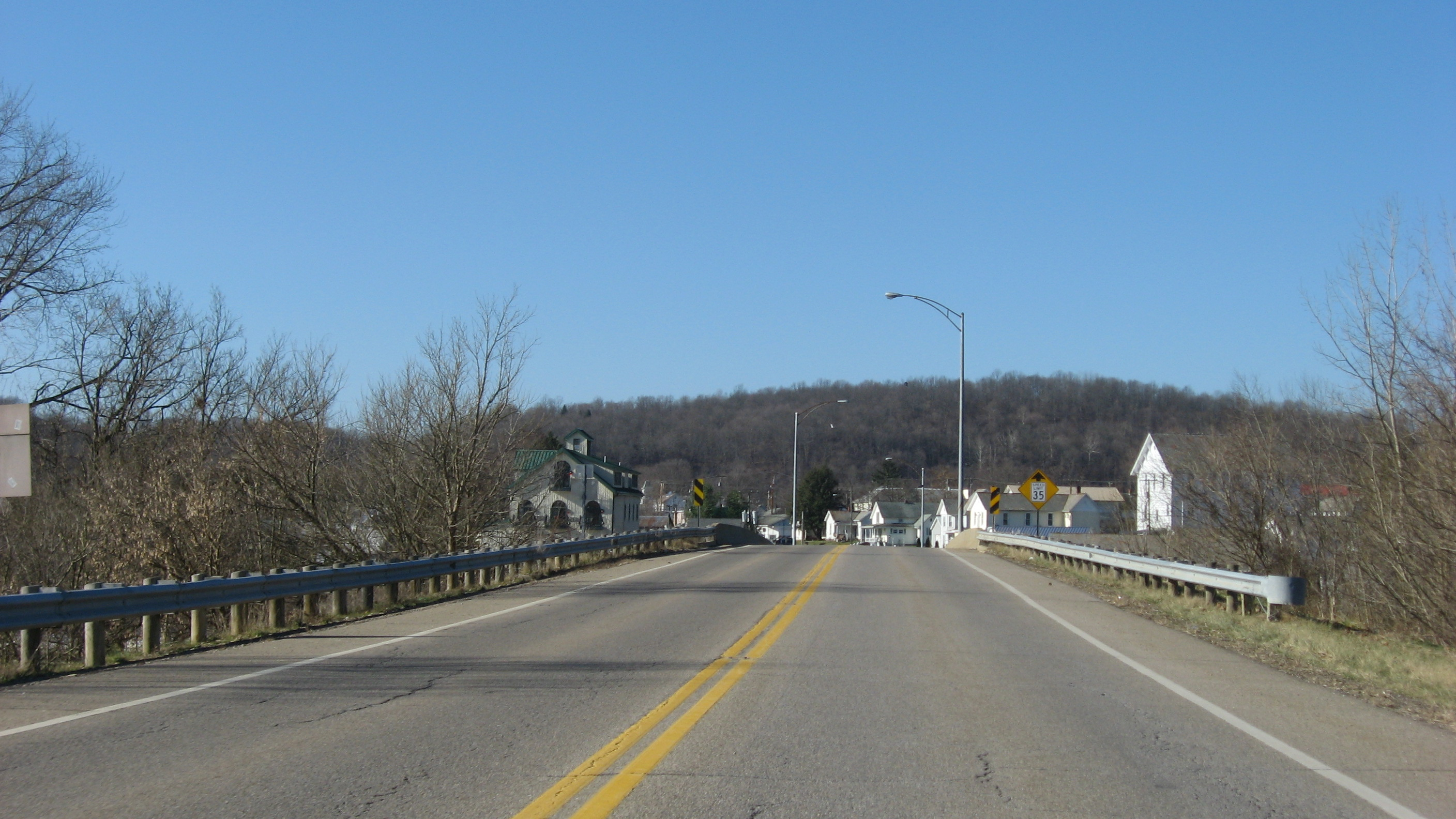
Stockport Bridge, carrying SR 266 over the Muskingum River

SR 266 begins at an intersection with SR 377 in Penn Township near the community of Pennsville. It generally heads southeast through a mostly agricultural area on a two-lane road. The highway heads through rolling terrain making sweeping curves before reaching a four-way intersection marking the northern terminus of SR 792. SR 792 heads south from here, Lick Run Road heads southwest, and SR 266 heads northeast, later east, descending a hill in a wooded area of Windsor Township. It enters the village of Stockport traveling due east along Broadway Street. Through here, SR 266 passes mostly residences but also heads past a cemetery and some businesses. It crosses the Muskingum River and comes to a T-intersection marking the southern terminus of SR 376. SR 266 heads south from this intersection through farmland but then closely follows the river where it passes a state memorial commemorating the Big Bottom massacre. The road slowly curves to the east but then sharply curves to the north through another farm. After passing a former alignment of the road, SR 266 heads up a hill, curves to the southeast and passes the former alignment before coming close to the river again. After a sharp curve to the north to follow the river, the highway heads through a mostly wooded area passing some houses and a farm. Turning to the northwest, SR 266 is located close to the river bank skirting the bottom of a high cliff. The river slowly bends to the east but the road continues its northeast course. It turns to the north entering Center Township, passes a small park and ride parking lot, and ends at SR 60 adjacent to Meigs Creek.

The entirety of SR 266 is within the confines of southeastern Morgan County. There is no portion of State Route 266 that is included within the National Highway System.

== History ==
SR 266 was first designated in 1926 along the routing within southeastern Morgan County that it generally occupies to this day. There have been no significant changes to its routing since its inception. Beginning in 2016, a portion of the road east of Stockport located close to the Muskingum River bed was slated for removal due to the constant need for repairs of landslides and rock falls. Ohio Department of Transportation (ODOT) hired Kokosing Construction Company to construct a US$15,000,000 realignment of the road, partially on a new alignment and the remaining over the township-maintained Point Lookout Road, at a higher elevation and away from the river banks. The project was completed in June 2018p. The 1.065-mile (1.714 km) former alignment of the highway located closer to the river has been designated by ODOT as SR 266-J, with the "J" suffix meaning the road is to be eventually abandoned by the state.

== Major intersections ==
The entire route is in Morgan County.

| Location | mi | km | Destinations | Notes |
|---|---|---|---|---|
| Penn Township | 0.000 | 0.000 | SR 377 – Chesterhill, Pennsville, McConnelsville | Western terminus |
| Penn Township | 2.353 | 3.787 | SR 792 south / Lick Run Road | Northern terminus of SR 792 |
| Windsor Township | 4.408 | 7.094 | SR 376 north – McConnelsville | Southern terminus of SR 376 |
| Center Township | 14.037 | 22.590 | SR 60 – McConnelsville, Marietta | Eastern terminus |
1.000 mi = 1.609 km; 1.000 km = 0.621 mi
