= Ohio State Route 376 =

State highway in southeastern Ohio, US

State Route 376

Route information
- Maintained by ODOT
- Length: 24.73 mi (39.80 km)
- Existed: 1934–present

Major junctions
- South end: SR 266 near Stockport
- North end: SR 60 / CR 66 in Blue Rock

Location
- Country: United States
- State: Ohio
- Counties: Morgan, Muskingum

Highway system
- Ohio State Highway System; Interstate; US; State; Scenic
← SR 375	→ SR 377

State Route 376 (SR 376) is a north–south state highway in the southeastern portion of the U.S. state of Ohio. SR 376 has its southern terminus at a T-intersection with SR 266 just across the Muskingum River from Stockport. Its northern terminus is at SR 60 in the unincorporated community of Blue Rock.

== Route description ==
The path of SR 376 takes it through parts of the counties of Morgan and Muskingum. This route is not included as a part of the National Highway System.

== History ==
SR 376 was designated in 1934. Originally, the highway ran from its current southern terminus at SR 266 near Stockport to the former SR 77 (now SR 60) in McConnelsville. In 1937, SR 376 was extended north of McConnelsville along a previously un-numbered roadway up to a new northern terminus at SR 340 in the hamlet of Ruraldale. By 1964, SR 340 was truncated to its current western terminus at SR 284. The portion east of SR 376 would become known as county-maintained Ruraldale Road, while the portion to the west would become an extension of SR 376 that would take it to its current northern terminus at SR 60 in Blue Rock.

== Major intersections ==
County	Location	mi	km	Destinations	Notes
Morgan	Windsor Township	0.00	0.00	SR 266 – Stockport, Big Bottom State Memorial	
Morgan	McConnelsville	9.73	15.66	SR 60 south (Main Street) / North 10th Street – Marietta	Southern end of SR 60 concurrency
Morgan	McConnelsville	9.92	15.96	SR 78 east (7th Street) – Caldwell	Southern end of SR 78 concurrency
Morgan	McConnelsville	9.99	16.08	SR 60 north / SR 78 west (West Main Street) / South Kennebec Street – Malta	Northern end of SR 60 / SR 78 concurrency
Muskingum	Blue Rock Township	24.73	39.80	SR 60 / CR 66 – McConnelsville, Zanesville	
1.000 mi = 1.609 km; 1.000 km = 0.621 mi: Concurrency terminus
