= Ohio State Route 60 =

State highway in Ohio, US

State Route 60
- Route of SR 60 highlighted in red

Route information
- Maintained by ODOT
- Length: 190.08 mi (305.90 km)
- Existed: 1923–present

Major junctions
- South end: WV 31 in Marietta
- SR 7 in Marietta; US 22 / US 40 / SR 93 in Zanesville; I-70 in Zanesville; US 36 in Warsaw; US 62 in Killbuck; US 30 near Hayesville; US 250 from Ashland to Savannah; US 224 in Ruggles; US 20 in Wakeman; SR 2 near Vermilion
- North end: US 6 in Vermilion

Location
- Country: United States
- State: Ohio
- Counties: Washington, Morgan, Muskingum, Coshocton, Holmes, Ashland, Huron, Erie

Highway system
- Ohio State Highway System; Interstate; US; State; Scenic
← SR 59	→ SR 61
← I-77	→ SR 78

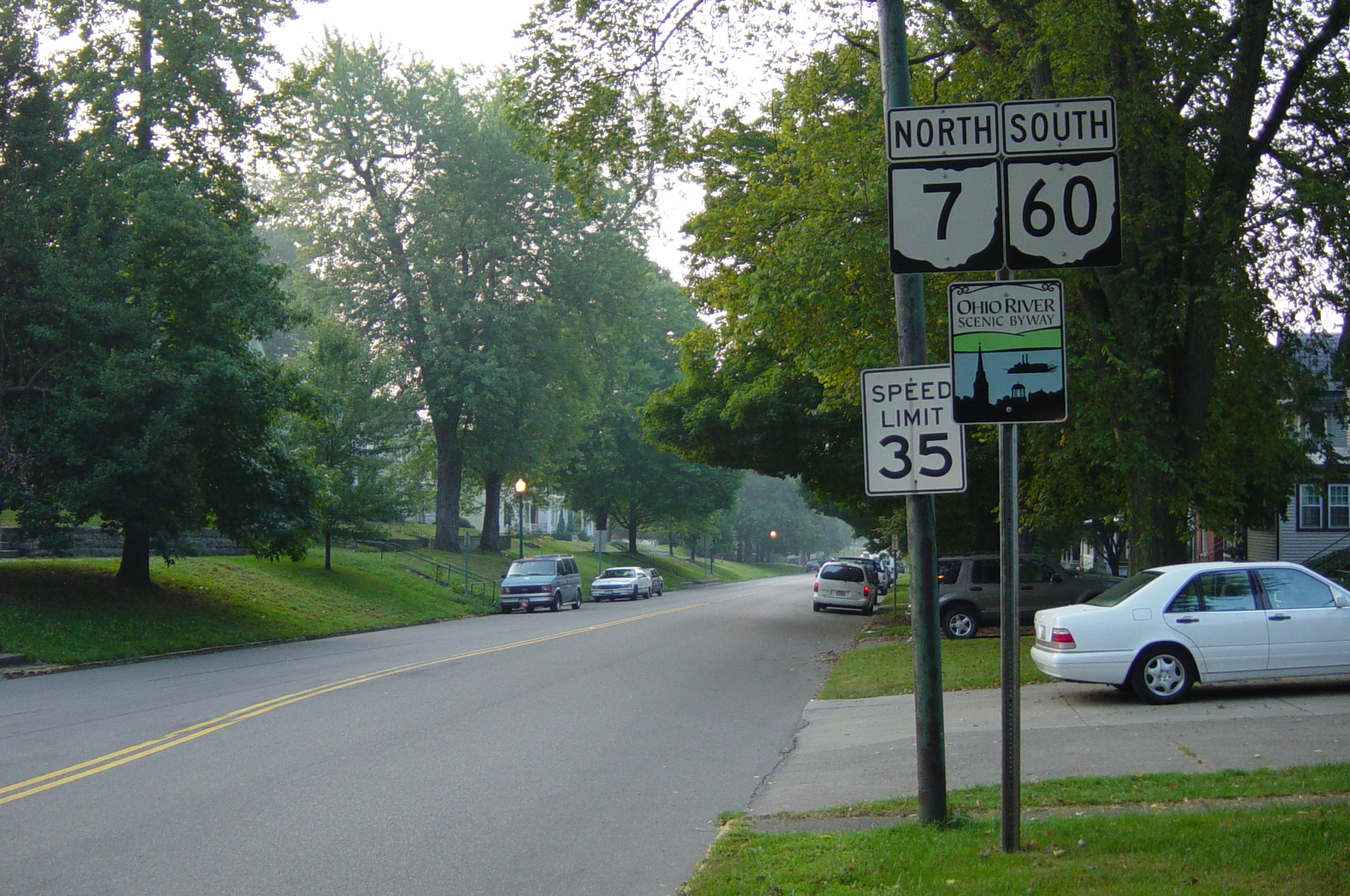
SR 7 concurrent with SR 60 in Marietta.

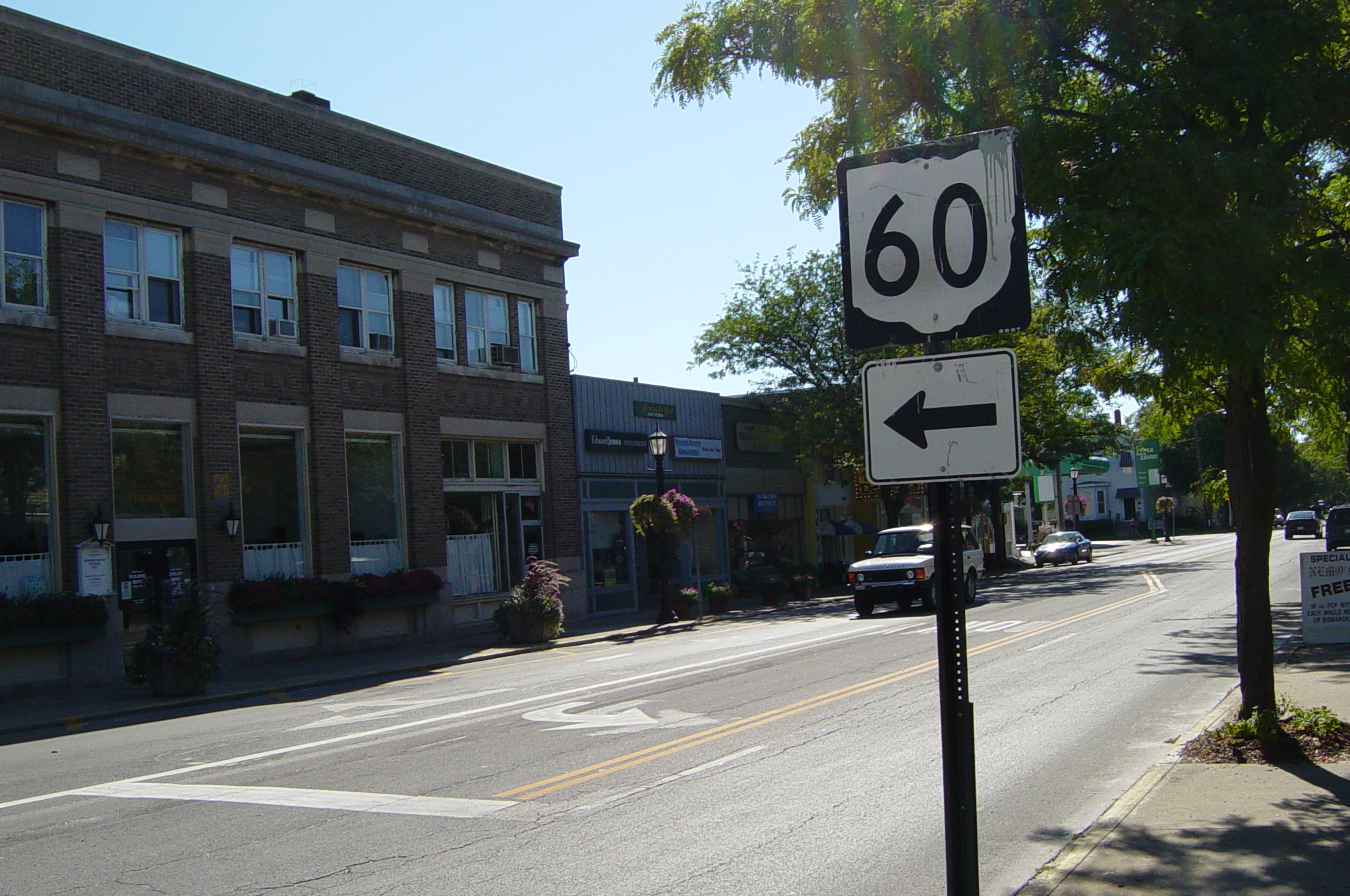
The northern terminus of SR 60 in downtown Vermilion.

State Route 60 (SR 60) is a north–south state highway that runs the entire length of the U.S. state of Ohio, from the Williamstown Bridge over the Ohio River in Marietta to U.S. Route 6 (US 6) near Lake Erie in Vermilion. It is the seventh longest state route in Ohio.

Heading south from Vermilion, SR 60 traverses rural North Central Ohio while connecting Vermilion, New London, Ashland, and Loudonville. South of Loudonville, SR 60 enters more hilly country, before entering the Muskingum River Valley at Dresden. It closely parallels the Muskingum River for the remainder of its journey to Marietta except for an eleven-mile (18 km) stretch in Morgan County where it moves inland to avoid bends in the river.

Markers for SR 60 are not posted south of the Greene Street/3rd Street intersection in Marietta. SR 60 is unsigned along SR 7 / Greene Street and the Williamstown Bridge approach.

== History ==
Parts of SR 60 were once signed as SR 77. In order to eliminate a numerical duplication with an Interstate highway in Ohio having the same number, Interstate 77, SR 77 was renumbered in part as SR 60.

== Major junctions ==
County	Location	mi	km	Destinations	Notes
Wood	Williamstown			WV 31 south – Williamstown	Continuation into West Virginia
Ohio River		0.00	0.00	Williamstown Bridge	
Washington	Marietta	0.28	0.45	SR 7 north (Greene Street) – Matamoras	Southern end of SR 7 concurrency
Washington	Marietta	1.32	2.12	SR 7 south (Washington Street) – Belpre, Athens	Northern end of SR 7 concurrency
Washington	Muskingum Township	3.58	5.76	SR 821 north to I-77 – Lower Salem	Southern terminus of SR 821
Washington	Lowell	10.65	17.14	SR 530 east (Walnut Street) – Warner	Western terminus of SR 530
Washington	Beverly	20.26	32.61	SR 339 north (Center Street) – Dexter City	Southern end of SR 339 concurrency
Washington	Beverly	20.44	32.89	SR 339 south (Ferry Street) – Porterfield	Northern end of SR 339 concurrency
Washington	Waterford Township	22.15	35.65	SR 83 north – Cumberland	Southern terminus of SR 83
Morgan	Center Township	25.59	41.18	SR 266 west – Stockport	Eastern terminus of SR 266
Morgan	Morgan Township	34.06	54.81	SR 607 north (Monastery Road)	Southern terminus of SR 607
Morgan	McConnelsville	35.65	57.37	SR 376 south (10th Street) – Stockport	Southern end of SR 376 concurrency
Morgan	McConnelsville	35.85	57.69	SR 78 east (7th Street) – Caldwell	Southern end of SR 78 concurrency
Morgan	McConnelsville	35.92	57.81	SR 376 north (Kennebec Avenue)	Northern end of SR 376 concurrency
Morgan	McConnelsville	36.47	58.69	SR 37 west / SR 78 west – Malta, Glouster, New Lexington	Northern end of SR 78 concurrency; eastern terminus of SR 37
Muskingum	Blue Rock Township	49.08	78.99	SR 376 south / CR 66 – Ruraldale	Northern terminus of SR 376
Muskingum	Wayne Township	60.53	97.41	SR 555 south to SR 719 / US 22 west / SR 93 south – South Zanesville	Northern terminus of SR 555
Muskingum	Zanesville	62.30	100.26	SR 146 east (Marietta Street)	Southern end of SR 146 concurrency
Muskingum	Zanesville	62.56	100.68	US 22 west / US 40 west / SR 93 south (Main Street)	Southern end of US 22 / US 40 / SR 93 concurrency
Muskingum	Zanesville	62.62	100.78	US 22 east / US 40 east / SR 93 north (Greenwood Avenue)	Northern end of US 22 / US 40 / SR 93 concurrency
Muskingum	Zanesville	62.86– 62.91	101.16– 101.24	I-70 / Elm Street – Columbus, Wheeling	Exit 155 (I-70)
Muskingum	Zanesville	63.11	101.57	SR 666 north (Zane Street)	Southern terminus of SR 666
Muskingum	Zanesville	63.85	102.76	SR 60G south / SR 146 east (Adair Avenue) / Maple Avenue	Northern terminus of unsigned SR 60G; northern end of SR 146 concurrency
Muskingum	Dresden	78.30	126.01	SR 208 east (Ninth Street) – Adamsville	Western terminus of SR 208
Muskingum	Cass Township	80.96– 81.10	130.29– 130.52	SR 16 – Coshocton, Newark	Interchange
Coshocton	Bedford Township	89.01	143.25	SR 541 west – Martinsburg	Southern end of SR 541 concurrency
Coshocton	Bedford Township	89.14	143.46	SR 541 east – Coshocton	Northern end of SR 541 concurrency
Coshocton	Warsaw	96.04	154.56	US 36 west (Main Street) / Bridge Street – Nellie	Southern end of US 36 concurrency
Coshocton	Bethlehem Township	98.55	158.60	US 36 east – Coshocton	Northern end of US 36 concurrency
Holmes	Killbuck Township	112.50	181.05	US 62 – Brinkhaven, Millersburg	
Holmes	Monroe Township	119.85	192.88	SR 39 east / SR 754 north – Millersburg, Shreve	Southern end of SR 39 concurrency; southern terminus of SR 754
Holmes	Nashville	124.97	201.12	SR 514 (Wooster Street)	
Holmes	Washington Township	125.71	202.31	SR 179 north / Township Road 477 – Mohicanville	Southern terminus of SR 179
Ashland	Loudonville	131.94	212.34	SR 3 south / SR 39 west (East Main Street) / South Union Street – Mount Vernon, Mohican	Northern end of SR 39 concurrency; southern end of SR 3 concurrency
Ashland	Loudonville	132.11	212.61	SR 3 north (Washington Street) – Wooster	Northern end of SR 3 concurrency
Ashland	Green Township	137.02	220.51	SR 95 – Perrysville, Mohicanville	
Ashland	Hayesville	142.21	228.86	SR 179 south (Main Street)	Northern terminus of SR 179
Ashland	Vermillion Township	142.98– 143.14	230.10– 230.36	US 30 – Wooster, Mansfield	Interchange
Ashland	Ashland	147.82	237.89	SR 511 south to US 42	Southern end of SR 511 concurrency
Ashland	Ashland	149.69	240.90	SR 96 east (East Main Street) / Center Street	Southern end of SR 96 concurrency
Ashland	Ashland	149.88	241.21	SR 96 west (Sandusky Street) / W 2nd Street	Northern end of SR 96 concurrency
Ashland	Ashland	150.54	242.27	SR 511 north (West 13th Street)	Northern end of SR 511 concurrency
Ashland	Ashland	151.22	243.36	US 250 east / Faultless Drive – Wooster	Southern end of US 250 concurrency
Ashland	Savannah	156.76	252.28	SR 302 east / McClaine Street – Nankin	Western terminus of SR 302
Ashland	Savannah	157.10	252.83	SR 545 south (Crowell Street) / CR 620 (Robinson Street) – Olivesburg, Mansfield	Northern terminus of SR 545
Ashland	Clear Creek Township	157.66	253.73	US 250 west – Norwalk	Northern end of US 250 concurrency
Ashland	Ruggles Township	161.75	260.31	US 224 – Napoleon, Akron	
Huron	New London	165.63	266.56	SR 162 (Main Street)	
Huron	Clarksfield Township	172.74	278.00	SR 18 east – Wellington	Southern end of SR 18 concurrency
Huron	Clarksfield Township	173.33	278.95	SR 18 west – Norwalk	Northern end of SR 18 concurrency
Huron	Wakeman–Wakeman Township municipal line	177.19	285.16	SR 303 (Townsend Street)	
Huron	Wakeman	177.70	285.98	US 20 west (Main Street) / Railroad Street – Norwalk	Southern end of US 20 concurrency
Huron	Wakeman	177.83	286.19	US 20 east (East Main Street) – Painesville	Northern end of US 20 concurrency
Erie	Florence Township	183.65	295.56	SR 113 – Milan, Elyria	
Erie	Vermilion Township	188.23– 188.51	302.93– 303.38	SR 2 – Cleveland, Toledo	Exit 156 (OH-2)
Erie	Vermilion	190.08	305.90	US 6 / LECT (Liberty Avenue) / Main Street	
1.000 mi = 1.609 km; 1.000 km = 0.621 mi: Concurrency terminus
