= Ohio State Route 792 =

State highway in southeastern Ohio, US

State Route 792

Route information
- Maintained by ODOT
- Length: 5.53 mi (8.90 km)
- Existed: 1937–present

Major junctions
- South end: SR 676 near Chesterhill
- North end: SR 266 near Stockport

Location
- Country: United States
- State: Ohio
- Counties: Washington, Morgan

Highway system
- Ohio State Highway System; Interstate; US; State; Scenic
← SR 791	→ SR 793

State Route 792 (SR 792) is a north–south state highway located in southeastern Ohio. The southern terminus of SR 792 is at a T-intersection with SR 676 approximately seven miles (11 km) east of Chesterhill. Its northern terminus is at SR 266 nearly one and a half miles (2.4 km) west of Stockport.

== Route description ==
SR 792 runs through an extremely small portion of northwestern Washington County and part of the southern end of Morgan County. The state highway is not included in the National Highway System.

== History ==
First established in 1937 along the path that is currently occupies between SR 676 and SR 266, SR 792 has not experienced any significant changes to its routing since its inception.

== Major intersections ==
County	Location	mi	km	Destinations	Notes
Washington	Wesley Township	0.00	0.00	SR 676 – Watertown, Chesterhill	
Morgan	Windsor Township	5.53	8.90	SR 266 / Lick Run Road – Stockport, Pennsville	
1.000 mi = 1.609 km; 1.000 km = 0.621 mi
