= Lelia N. Morris =

American Methodist hymnwriter

- Born: Lelia Naylor; April 15, 1862; Pennsville, Ohio
- Died: July 23, 1929 (aged 67); Auburn, New York
- Other names: Mrs. Charles H. Morris, (Mrs.) C. H. Morris, (Mrs.) C. H. M.
- Occupation: Hymnwriter
- Years active: 1890s – 1910s or later

Lelia Naylor Morris (April 15, 1862 – July 23, 1929) was an American Methodist hymnwriter. Some sources give her first name as Leila, but her obituary, grave marker, and other sources give her name as Lelia. (Note: A plaque erected to her memory at McConnelsville, Ohio, in 1998 by the Trinity United Methodist Church and the Ohio Historical Society gives her name as Lelia Morris.) She is sometimes known as Mrs. Charles H. Morris, as (Mrs.) C. H. Morris, or as (Mrs.) C. H. M., having adopted her husband's forenames upon marriage after the custom of the time.

== Biography ==
Morris was born in Pennsville, Ohio. While still a child, she moved with her family to Malta. Later, she and her sister and her mother ran a millinery shop in McConnelsville. In 1881, she married Charles H. Morris. The couple were active in the Methodist Episcopal Church, and attended camp meetings at places such as Old Camp Sychar in Mount Vernon and Sebring Camp in Sebring. In the 1890s, she began to write hymns and gospel songs; it has been said that she wrote more than 1,000 songs and tunes, and that she did so while doing her housework. In 1913, her eyesight began to fail, after which her son constructed a blackboard for her that was 28 feet (8.5 m) long with oversized staff lines, so that she could continue to compose.

Around 1928, she and her husband moved to live with their daughter in Auburn, New York, where she died. She is buried in McConnelsville Cemetery in McConnelsville.

== Songs ==
- "Are You Looking For The Fullness"
- "Bring Your Vessels, Not a Few", 1912
- "Can the World See Jesus in You"
- "For A Worldwide Revival"
- "For God So Loved This Sinful World"
- "Fully Surrendered To Jesus The Lord"
- "Hallelujah for the Blood"
- "Holiness Unto the Lord", a.k.a. "Called unto Holiness", 1900
- "Hymn, to Fight!"
- "I Know God's Promise is True", 1899
- In the misty days of yore.
- "Let All the People Praise Thee", 1906
- "Let Jesus Come into Your Heart"
- "Nearer, Still Nearer", 1898
- "Sanctifying Power", 1908
- "Sweet Will of God", a.k.a. "My Stubborn Will at Last Hath Yielded", 1900
- "Sweeter as the Years Go By", 1912
- "The Fight is On", circa 1905
- "The Stranger of Galilee"
- "'Tis Marvelous and Wonderful"
- "Victory all the Time", 1901
- "What If It Were Today?" 1912
- "Where with God the Saint shall reign"
- "A New Touch of Fire"
