= Ohio State Route 676 =

State highway in southeastern Ohio, US

State Route 676

Route information
- Maintained by ODOT
- Length: 26.40 mi (42.49 km)
- Existed: 1937–present

Major junctions
- West end: SR 555 near Chesterhill
- East end: SR 7 in Marietta

Location
- Country: United States
- State: Ohio
- Counties: Washington, Morgan

Highway system
- Ohio State Highway System; Interstate; US; State; Scenic
| ← SR 675 | → SR 677 |

State Route 676 (SR 676) is a 26.53-mile (42.70 km) long east–west state highway in the southeastern portion of the U.S. state of Ohio. The western terminus of SR 676 is at a T-intersection with SR 555 approximately 3 miles (4.8 km) southeast of the village of Chesterhill. Its eastern terminus is at a T-intersection with SR 7 in the southwestern portion of the city of Marietta.

== Route description ==
SR 676 traverses the western portion of Washington County and a small portion of southern Morgan County. There are no segments of SR 676 that are a part of the National Highway System (NHS), a network of route determined to be most important for the economy, mobility and defense of the country.

== History ==
The SR 676 designation was established in 1937. It has utilized the same routing between SR 555 near Chesterhill and SR 7 near Marietta throughout its history. Initially, the entire length of SR 676 was a gravel roadway. In 1947, the easternmost stretch of SR 676 between County Road 183 (CR 183) and SR 7 was paved. Four years later, the highway was hard-surfaced between the present SR 339 junction, at the time designated as SR 76, and CR 183. The remaining gravel portion of SR 676 between SR 555 and the current SR 339 intersection was paved by 1961.

== Major intersections ==
| County | Location | mi | km | Destinations | Notes |
|---|---|---|---|---|---|
| Washington | Wesley Township | 0.00 | 0.00 | SR 555 – Chesterhill, Bartlett | |
| Washington | Wesley Township | 4.30 | 6.92 | SR 792 north | Southern terminus of SR 792 |
| Morgan | No major junctions | | | | |
| Washington | No major junctions | | | | |
| Morgan | No major junctions | | | | |
| Washington | Watertown Township | 14.24 | 22.92 | SR 339 south – Barlow | Western end of SR 339 concurrency |
| Washington | Watertown Township | 14.39 | 23.16 | SR 339 north / Franklin Street – Beverly | Eastern end of SR 339 concurrency |
| Washington | Marietta | 26.40 | 42.49 | SR 7 (Fort Harmar Drive) – New Matamoras, Belpre, Athens | |
1.000 mi = 1.609 km; 1.000 km = 0.621 mi: Concurrency terminus
