= Ohio State Route 677 =

State highway in Vinton County, Ohio, US

State Route 677

Route information
- Maintained by ODOT
- Length: 4.78 mi (7.69 km)
- Existed: 1937–present

Major junctions
- South end: US 50 near McArthur
- North end: SR 278 in Zaleski

Location
- Country: United States
- State: Ohio
- Counties: Vinton

Highway system
- Ohio State Highway System; Interstate; US; State; Scenic
← SR 676	→ SR 678

State Route 677 (SR 677) is a nearly 5-mile-long (8.0 km) north–south running state route existing entirely in Vinton County, Ohio. Its southern terminus is at US 50, slightly to the east of McArthur in Elk Township, and its northern terminus is at SR 278 in Zaleski. The route passes through rural east-central Vinton County while connecting the two towns. Locally, the route is known as Powder Plant Road, as an Austin Powder Company explosives plant lies along the route.

== Route description ==
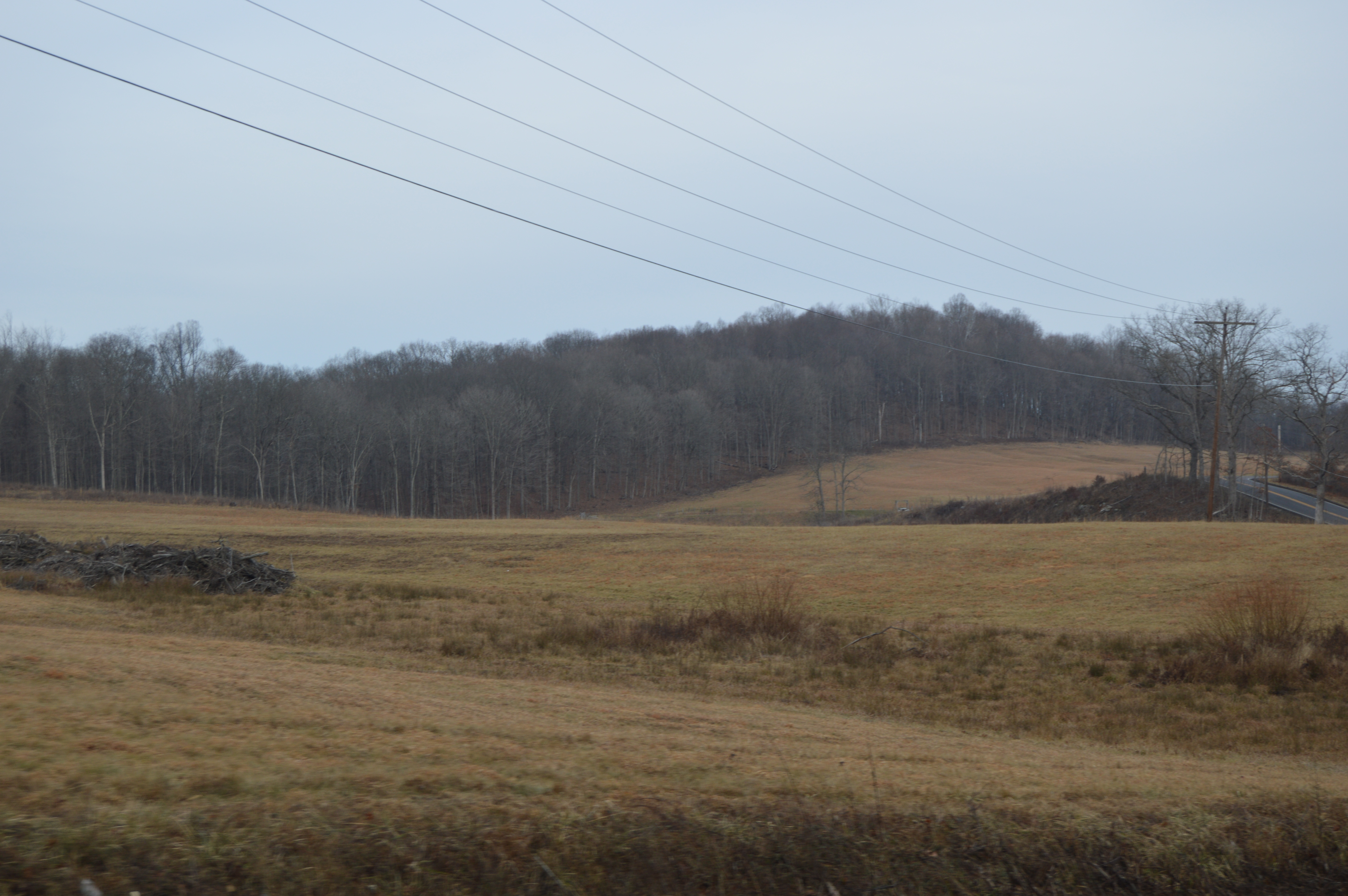
Fields south of the powder plant

All of SR 677 is situated within Vinton County. The highway is not included as a part of the National Highway System.

== History ==
SR 677 first appeared in 1937 along the path between US 50 and SR 278 that it maintains to this day. The highway has not experienced any major changes since its first appearance.

== Major intersections ==
The entire route is in Vinton County.

Location	mi	km	Destinations	Notes
Elk Township	0.00	0.00	US 50 – Albany, McArthur	
Zaleski	4.78	7.69	SR 278 (Main Street / Second Street)	
1.000 mi = 1.609 km; 1.000 km = 0.621 mi
