= Ohio State Route 793 =

State highway in Fairfield County, Ohio, US

State Route 793

- Route of SR 793 as it exists today highlighted in red

Route information
- Maintained by ODOT
- Length: 4.80 mi (7.72 km)
- Existed: 1959–May 23, 2006

Major junctions
- South end: Southeastern Ohio Training Center near Lancaster
- North end: US 33 in Lancaster

Location
- Country: United States
- State: Ohio
- Counties: Fairfield

Highway system
- Ohio State Highway System; Interstate; US; State; Scenic
← SR 792	→ SR 794

State Route 793 (SR 793) was a state route in the US state of Ohio that served as a connector route from Southeastern Ohio Training Center near Lancaster through Fairfield County to U.S. Route 33 (US 33) in Lancaster. SR 793 was originally designated in 1959. The route was decommissioned in 2006.

== Route description ==
SR 793 began at the Southeastern Ohio Training Center south of Lancaster. From there, the route heads northeast via Broad Street. The highway passed through woodland, before turning towards the north. The highway entered the city of Lancaster. SR 793 terminated at an interchange with US 33, now Memorial Drive.

== History ==
When SR 793 was first introduced into the state route system in 1959, it served as a connector between Southeastern Ohio Training Center near Lancaster and US 33 in Lancaster. The route continued to serve in this capacity until it was removed from the state route system on May 23, 2006.

== Major intersections ==
The entire route is in Fairfield County.

Location	mi	km	Destinations	Notes
Hocking Township	0.00	0.00	Southeastern Ohio Training Center	Southern terminus of SR 793
Lancaster	4.58– 4.80	7.37– 7.72	US 33	Northern terminus of SR 793; now Memorial Drive
1.000 mi = 1.609 km; 1.000 km = 0.621 mi
