= Ohio State Route 794 =

State highway in Clark County, Ohio, US

State Route 794

- Route of SR 794 c. 2012

Route information
- Maintained by ODOT
- Length: 2.51 mi (4.04 km)
- Existed: 1950–November 19, 2013

Major junctions
- West end: US 68 near Springfield
- East end: SR 72 near Springfield

Location
- Country: United States
- State: Ohio
- Counties: Clark

Highway system
- Ohio State Highway System; Interstate; US; State; Scenic
← SR 793	→ SR 795

State Route 794 (SR 794) was a short east–west state highway in west-central Ohio, a U.S. state. This route, which existed entirely within Clark County, and south of Springfield, served as an access road for the Springfield-Beckley Municipal Airport and the Springfield Air National Guard Base. The western terminus of SR 794 was at U.S. Route 68, and its eastern terminus was at SR 72. SR 794 was known as Blee Road from US 68 until it met Sparrow Road, which it followed east until its terminus at SR 72. Following a realignment of the road around the National Guard Base in 2013, the entire route was abandoned from the state highway system and is now a county-maintained road.

== Route description ==
SR 794 began at an intersection with US 68 in Clark County's Green Township south of Springfield, and headed eastward. With the exception of a couple of houses just east of US 68, the south side of SR 794 straddled the northern portion of Springfield-Beckley Municipal Airport for its entire length. Meanwhile, on the north side of SR 794, a few homes lined the highway just east of US 68, then farmland took over as the primary feature. SR 794 curved to the northeast, and came upon its intersection with Peacock Road. The highway passed by the main buildings and affiliated parking lots associated with the airport and base. Curving back to the east, SR 794 met Sparrow Road. East of there, the route passed by the northeastern end of the primary runway serving the airport, and ultimately arrived at its endpoint at SR 72. Continuing east of SR 72 after SR 794 terminated is Sparrow Road.

== History ==
The SR 794 designation came into being in 1950, generally along the route that it followed throughout its history. The only difference is that the route's eastern terminus was at a location slightly south of its long-time eastern terminus along SR 72. In 1958, maps first showed the eastern terminus of SR 794 as being relocated to its present location at the intersection of SR 72 and Sparrow Road. Between that time and 2013, no major changes would occur to the routing.

In 2013, the Ohio Department of Transportation (ODOT) undertook a project to slightly relocate the road carrying SR 794 around the Springfield Air National Guard Base. Due to restrictions put in place after the 9/11 attacks, public roads were required to be located certain minimum distances from military base buildings. The project, which was partially funded through Federal and state grants, was finished in October 2013 and came in US$500,000 under budget. The old road through the base became a part of the base's internal road system, while the remainder of SR 794 and the new realignment fell under the jurisdiction of Clark County on November 19, 2013. The entire road is now known as Clark County Road 794.

== Major intersections ==
The entire route was in Green Township, Clark County.

mi	km	Destinations	Notes
0.00	0.00	US 68 – Yellow Springs, Springfield	
2.51	4.04	SR 72 / Sparrow Road – Cedarville, Springfield	
1.000 mi = 1.609 km; 1.000 km = 0.621 mi
