= Donation Tract =

Coordinates: 39°33′55″N 81°34′40″W

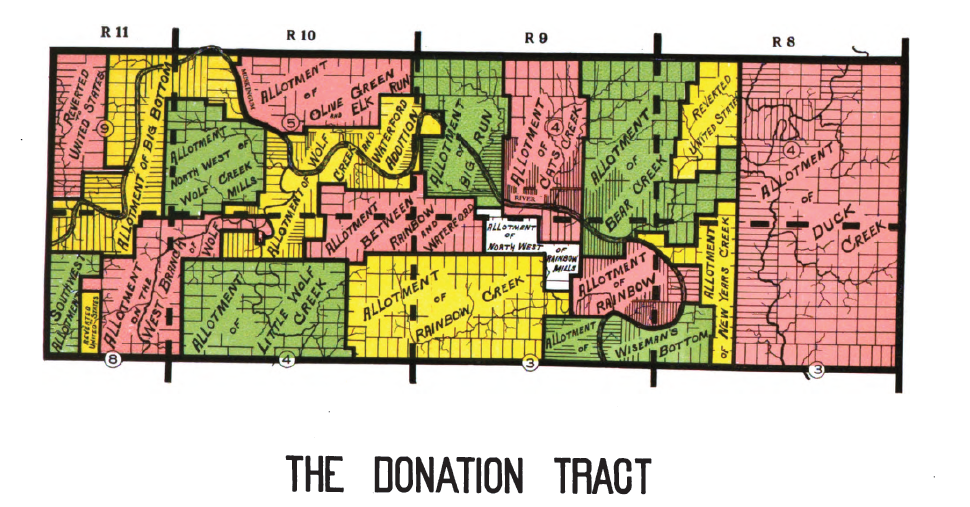
The Donation Tract lies in southern Ohio

The Donation Tract was a land tract in southern Ohio that was established by the Congress in the late 18th century to buffer Ohio Company lands against local indigenous people. Congress gave 100-acre (0.40 km^{2}) lots to men who settled on the land. This marked the first time that federal land was given without charge to specified settlers, predating the more famous Homestead Act of 1862 by seventy years.

== Background ==
The Ohio Company of Associates, also known as the Ohio Company, was a land company that was formed on March 3, 1786, by General Rufus Putnam, Benjamin Tupper, Samuel Holden Parsons and Manasseh Cutler, who had met in Boston, Massachusetts to discuss the settlement of the territory around the Ohio River. They convinced Congress to sell the company a tract at the confluence of the Muskingum River and the Ohio River. Settlement began at the newly formed town of Marietta, Ohio in April 1788. Indians objected to this incursion on their homeland, leading to the War of 1790. Most of the troops in Fort Harmar, near Marietta, were transferred to Fort Washington to protect Cincinnati, so settlers ended up having to defend themselves at the expense of the Ohio Company. Wyandots killed settlers in the Big Bottom massacre of Jan. 2, 1791, in present day Morgan County.

== Congressional donation ==
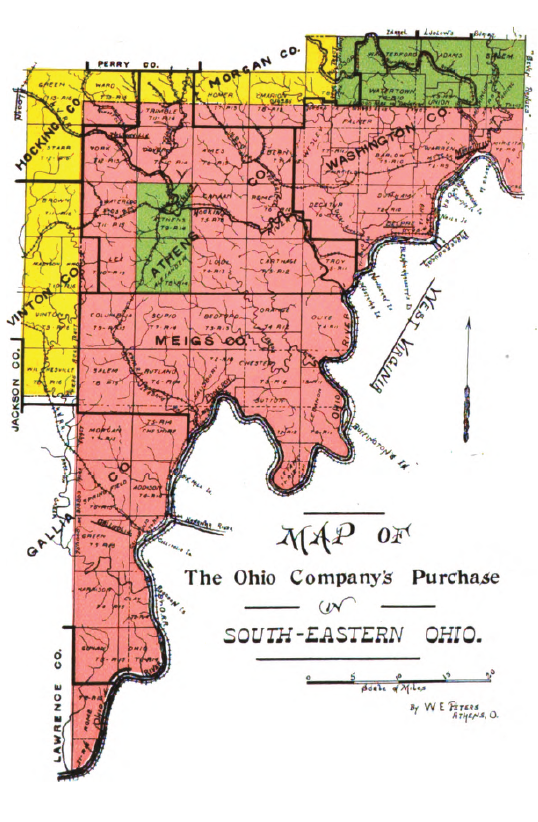
The Donation Tract is the green area in the upper right

The Ohio Company petitioned Congress in March, 1792 to donate some land along the north boundary of their lands to form a buffer against the Indians. With the Act of April 21, 1792, Congress donated 100,000 acres (400 km^{2}) to the officers of the Company. The land was to be conveyed in lots of 100 acres (0.40 km^{2}), free of expense, to each male of at least 18 years of age who settled on the land. The Donation Tract is in parts of modern day Adams, Fearing, Salem, Muskingum, Palmer, Waterford, and Watertown Township in Washington County, and Windsor Township in Morgan County. The land was divided into “allotments”, and each allotment was further divided into 100-acre (0.40 km^{2}) lots. These lots did not follow the usual surveying plan of survey townships and one square mile sections. That part of the tract that was not conveyed by the Company to settlers within five years was to be returned to the federal government. However, nothing was done about the unsold lots until an act in 1818 when Congress required their return so they could be sold by the Marietta Land Office. After settlement of the Donation Tract, the Ohio Company did not suffer another raid as large as the Big Bottom Massacre.

== See also ==
- Ohio Lands
- Historic regions of the United States
