= Big Bottom massacre =

1791 mass killing in Ohio

- Part of the Northwest Indian War
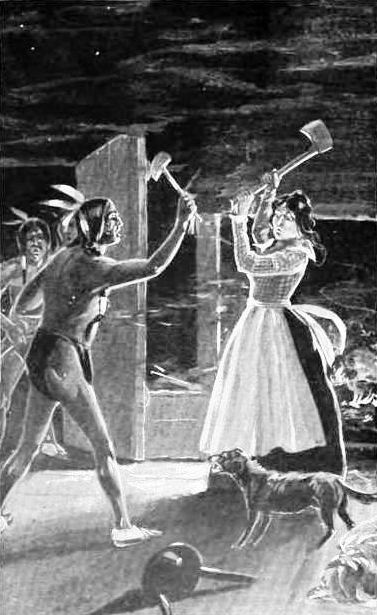
- An illustration of the massacre
- Location: near Stockport, Ohio
- Date: January 2, 1791
- Attack type: Mass killing
- Deaths: 12–14 killed
- Perpetrators: Lenape and Wyandot warriors

- Big Bottom Massacre Site
- U.S. National Register of Historic Places
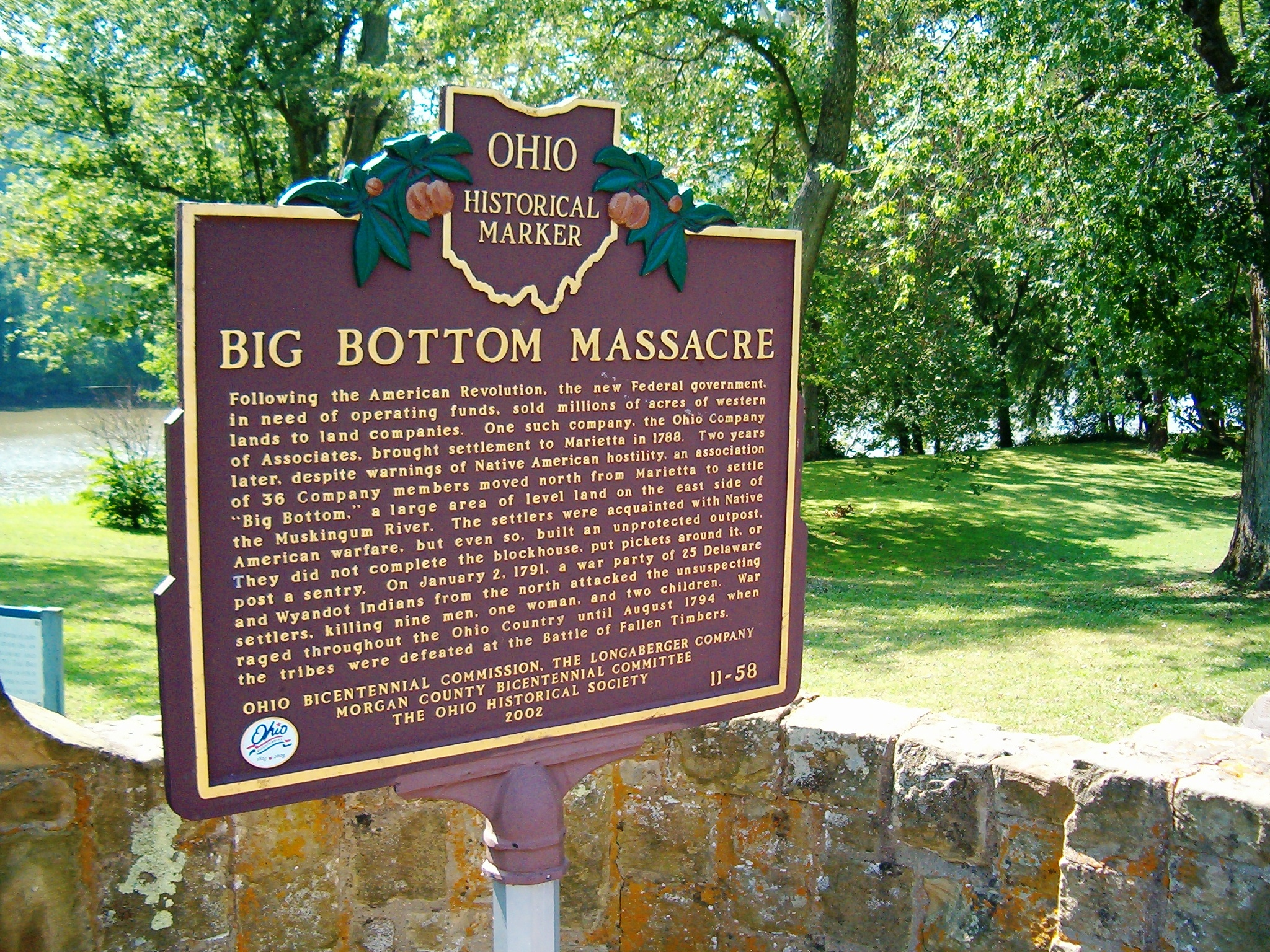
- Plaque at the site of the Big Bottom massacre

- Location within Ohio Location within the United States
- Nearest city: Stockport, Ohio
- Coordinates: 39°31′58″N 81°46′26″W
- Built: 1791
- NRHP reference No.: 70000512
- Added to NRHP: November 10, 1970

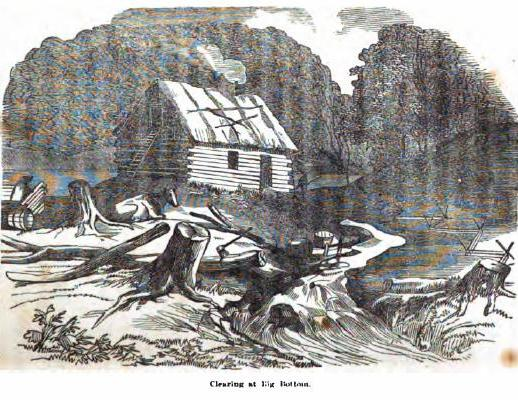
Imagined Blockhouse at Big Bottom, 1791

The Big Bottom massacre was a mass killing perpetrated by Lenape and Wyandot warriors against American settlers on January 2, 1791. The massacre occurred near present-day Stockport, Ohio. It is considered part of the Northwest Indian Wars, in which native Americans in the Ohio Country clashed with American settlers, seeking to expel them from their territory.

Following the American Revolutionary War, the United States government was selling land in the Ohio Country, mostly to companies that promised to develop it. A group of squatters had moved up to this area and settled along flood plain, or "bottom" land, of the Muskingum River, some 30 mi (48 km) north of an Ohio Company of Associates settlement at Marietta, Ohio. The settlement was raided by Lenape and Wyandot warriors seeking to expel the newcomers. They stormed the incomplete blockhouse and killed eleven men, one woman, and two children. (Accounts vary as to the number of casualties.) The Native Americans captured three settlers, with at least one dying later, while four others escaped into the woods.

The Ohio Company of Associates sought to provide greater protection for settlers in the Northwest Territory, as the conflicts became more widespread. A coalition of Native American tribes fought to expel the newcomers and preserve their lands. The war did not end until 1794.

The Ohio History Connection manages the three-acre Big Bottom Park site, which has been listed on the National Register of Historic Places. In addition to the markers noted below, the site features a 12 ft (3.7 m)-tall marble obelisk, picnic tables, and information signs about the site's history.

== Background ==
In the Gnadenhutten Massacre of 1782, Revolutionary militia forces had killed ninety-six unarmed Christian Lenape men, women and children, although this group were considered friendly and were neutral in the war. The attack took place at their Gnadenhutten settlement on the northern part of the Muskingum River. The terminus of this river was south at the Ohio. Later in 1789, the Treaty of Fort Harmar was signed between the United States and what an American recorded as an "unrepresentative gathering of undistinguished chiefs". The land of the Wyandot was reduced by the treaty, but in Ohio control of their and other tribal lands was still under dispute.

At the same time, the United States government sold off vast tracts of land in the Ohio Country to raise money after the war and satisfy the desires of numerous settlers for lands across the Appalachian Mountains. Tensions increased as American settlers began entering the area. The Ohio Company of Associates, formed by a group of several New England veterans of the American Revolution, organized for land speculation and development. They purchased approximately 1,500,000 acres (6,100 km^{2}) in the Northwest Territory from the United States in 1787, but their purchases were not patented by Congress until 1792. Early settlers on these lands followed national guidelines for settling the West and respected the government a great deal, likely because of their role in the Revolution.

The founders of the Ohio Company promoted orderly and nationalistic western expansion. The founders of the company began to worry about problems that arose as more individuals bought into the land company, and began to assert their own goals by striking out into territory where the Company did not have title. Armed confrontations with native American tribes threatened the Company's settlement at Marietta.

A financial crisis in New York was hurting the investors as well as the company treasury. The company struggled to integrate interests between settlers and investors in the East and those in the West. The Company's power structure favored the Eastern part of the territory, and settlers in the West were not well represented. Westerners wanted protection from Indians, but funds were low and the Ohio company refused. Armed conflict soon broke out between settlers and the native American tribes who wanted to expel them.

== Attack by Lenape and Wyandot warriors ==
A group of about thirty-six Company settlers had gone upriver from Marietta, squatting east of the Muskingum on land where the Company did not hold title. Tensions were rising with American Indians in the area. In late December 1790, Colonel William Stacy, a war veteran, ice skated 30 miles up the frozen Muskingum River to warn two of his sons at the Big Bottom settlement about the risk of an attack.

Several days later on January 2, 1791, the settlement was raided from the north by Lenape and Wyandot warriors, who killed several settlers. This would go on to be dubbed the "Big Bottom Massacre" by settlers and other Americans. According to the Ohio Historical Society, nine men, a woman and two children were killed in the attack. Colonel Stacy's sons, John Stacy and Philip (Philemon) Stacy, were among the casualties. John was killed directly in the attack, and Philemon was taken captive, dying later.

== Aftermath ==
The attack led to United States retaliation. Conflicts continued in the Northwest Indian Wars, in which a coalition of native American tribes tried to expel American settlers from this territory. They were finally defeated in 1794 in the Battle of Fallen Timbers.

On April 21, 1792, Congress authorized the Donation Tract, an area of 100,000 acres located along the northern border of the Ohio Company lands, hoping to rapidly create a buffer zone sheltering Ohio Company lands from native American incursions. Congress offered a 100-acre lot free to any male, eighteen or older, who "would actually settle on the land at the time the deed was conveyed."

== Historical markers ==
In 1905 Obadiah Brokaw, whose property included the site of the former blockhouse, erected a monument to the massacre "at his own expense." The monument and surrounding two acres of land were transferred to the Ohio State Archaeological and Historical Society, later the Ohio Historical Society, in the fall of 1905. The Ohio Historical Society maintains Big Bottom Memorial Park in Stockport, Ohio. In 2002, the historical society placed a marker commemorating the massacre at the park entrance. The marker was sponsored in part by the Ohio Bicentennial Commission.

A historical marker at the intersection of Butler Street and Front Street in Marietta, Ohio lists the names of those killed at Big Bottom. The marker was placed by the New Century Historical Society in 1893.

== Sources ==
- Adams, James Truslow. Dictionary of American History. New York: Scribner's, 1940.
- "Frontier Terrorism" , Blog
- Hildreth, Samuel Prescott, Pioneer History: Being an Account of the First Examinations of the Ohio Valley, and the Early Settlement of the Northwest Territory; chiefly from original manuscripts (1848). According to the OSAHS (1906 article below), this is the ONLY authentic record of these events. [Page 4.]
- Kramb, Edwin A., Buckeye Battlefields. 1999 (reprint June 2006), pp. 99–103.
- Ohio State Archæological and Historical Society. Ohio Archæological and Historical Quarterly Volume XV (1906).
- Hulbert, "The Wallace Monongahela Indian Trail", Ohio Historical Society.
