= Stockport, Ohio =

- Village
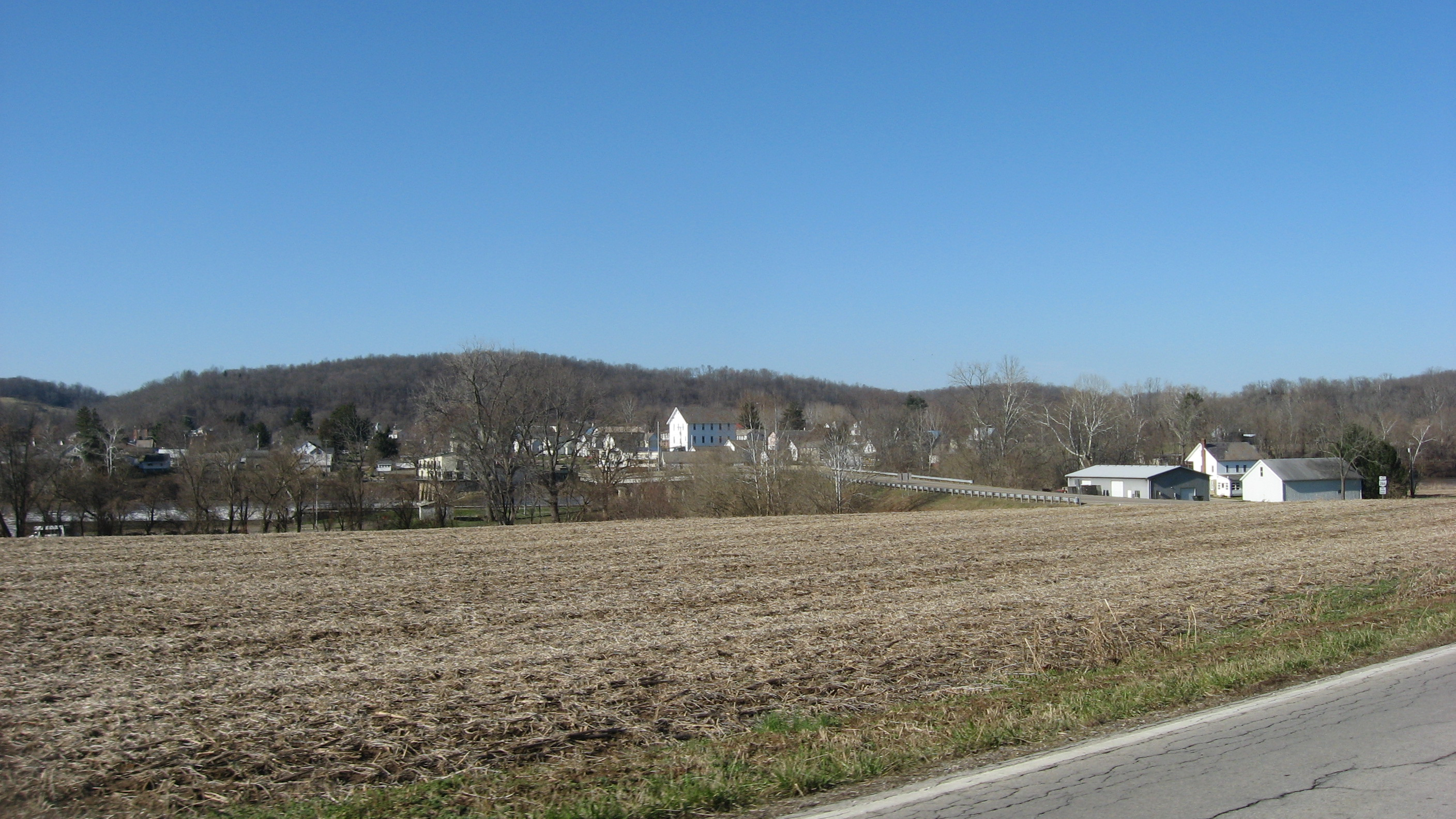
- Overview from the east

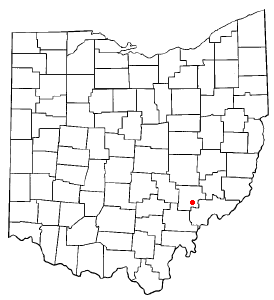
- Location of Stockport, Ohio

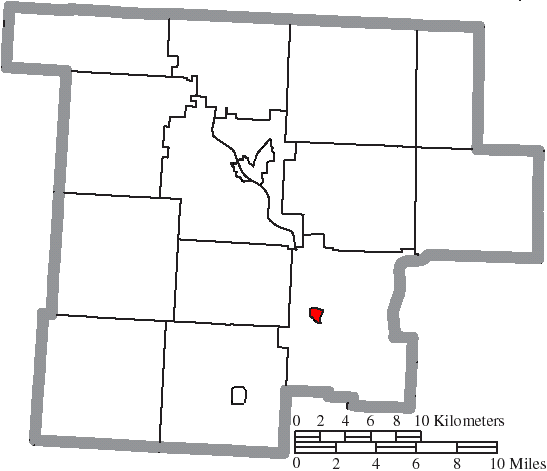
- Location of Stockport in Morgan County
- Coordinates: 39°32′56″N 81°47′40″W
- Country: United States
- State: Ohio
- County: Morgan

Area
  - Total: 0.33 sq mi (0.85 km^{2})
  - Land: 0.33 sq mi (0.85 km^{2})
  - Water: 0 sq mi (0.00 km^{2})
- Elevation: 699 ft (213 m)

Population (2020)
  - Total: 483
  - Density: 1,469.9/sq mi (567.53/km^{2})
- Time zone: UTC-5 (Eastern (EST))
  - Summer (DST): UTC-4 (EDT)
- ZIP code: 43787
- Area code: 740
- FIPS code: 39-74748
- GNIS feature ID: 2399904
- Website: http://stockportohio.weebly.com/

Stockport is a village in Morgan County, Ohio, United States, along the Muskingum River. The population was 483 at the 2020 census.

== History ==
The town is named after the town in England of the same name. The area was part of what was called the Donation Tract in the Northwest Territory, a portion of 100,000 acres for which Congress authorized grants of 100 acres in 1792 to any male 18 years of older who would settle the land at the time of deed. Congress was seeking to support the development and settlement of adjacent lands owned by the Ohio Company of Associates. The Donation Tract was designed for quick settlement and to serve as a buffer for the Company lands from Native American raids. Several tribes had allied in the Northwest Territory in an effort to expel European-American settlers, and armed conflicts had been underway since 1785. The Stockport post office was established in 1838.

== Geography ==
Stockport is located at 39°32′58″N 81°47′39″W.

According to the United States Census Bureau, the village has a total area of 0.33 square miles (0.85 km^{2}), all land.

Stockport is located at the junctions of State Routes 266 and 376.

== Demographics ==
Historical population
Census	Pop.	Note	%±
1870	289		—
1880	335		15.9%
1890	416		24.2%
1900	376		−9.6%
1910	438		16.5%
1920	455		3.9%
1930	458		0.7%
1940	422		−7.9%
1950	404		−4.3%
1960	458		13.4%
1970	471		2.8%
1980	558		18.5%
1990	462		−17.2%
2000	540		16.9%
2010	503		−6.9%
2020	483		−4.0%
U.S. Decennial Census

=== 2010 census ===
As of the census of 2010, there were 503 people, 195 households, and 140 families living in the village. The population density was 1,524.2 inhabitants per square mile (588.5/km^{2}). There were 234 housing units at an average density of 709.1 per square mile (273.8/km^{2}). The racial makeup of the village was 91.7% White, 3.0% African American, 0.2% from other races, and 5.2% from two or more races. Hispanic or Latino of any race were 0.6% of the population.

There were 195 households, of which 34.9% had children under the age of 18 living with them, 48.2% were married couples living together, 18.5% had a female householder with no husband present, 5.1% had a male householder with no wife present, and 28.2% were non-families. 25.6% of all households were made up of individuals, and 12.9% had someone living alone who was 65 years of age or older. The average household size was 2.58 and the average family size was 3.01.

The median age in the village was 35.1 years. 26.6% of residents were under the age of 18; 10.7% were between the ages of 18 and 24; 23% were from 25 to 44; 26.8% were from 45 to 64; and 13.3% were 65 years of age or older. The gender makeup of the village was 46.7% male and 53.3% female.

=== 2000 census ===
As of the census of 2000, there were 540 people, 227 households, and 145 families living in the village. The population density was 1,614.8 inhabitants per square mile (623.5/km^{2}). There were 253 housing units at an average density of 756.6 per square mile (292.1/km^{2}). The racial makeup of the village was 95.00% White, 2.04% African American, and 2.96% from two or more races. 0.74% of the population were Hispanic or Latino of any race.

There were 227 households, out of which 33.9% had children under the age of 18 living with them, 43.6% were married couples living together, 16.7% had a female householder with no husband present, and 35.7% were non-families. 33.0% of all households were made up of individuals, and 16.7% had someone living alone who was 65 years of age or older. The average household size was 2.38 and the average family size was 2.99.

In the village, the population was spread out, with 26.3% under the age of 18, 10.0% from 18 to 24, 26.1% from 25 to 44, 20.9% from 45 to 64, and 16.7% who were 65 years of age or older. The median age was 35 years. For every 100 females there were 82.4 males. For every 100 females age 18 and over, there were 80.9 males.

The median income for a household in the village was $22,054, and the median income for a family was $26,000. Males had a median income of $26,875 versus $13,375 for females. The per capita income for the village was $10,314. 39.6% of the population and 27.8% of families were below the poverty line, including 54.7% of those under the age of 18 and 12.1% of those 65 and older.
