= Pennsville, Ohio =

Unincorporated community in Ohio, U.S.

Coordinates: 39°34′31″N 81°51′19″W

Pennsville is an unincorporated community in Morgan County, in the U.S. state of Ohio.

== History ==
Pennsville was platted in 1828. The community took its name from Penn Township. Pennsville was originally chiefly settled by Quakers. In 2017 the nearest Quaker Meeting house is in nearby Chesterhill A post office was in operation in Pennsville starting February 27, 1829; the post office was closed October 29, 1988, and the post office duties were moved to Stockport, Ohio.
