= McConnelsville, Ohio =

- Village
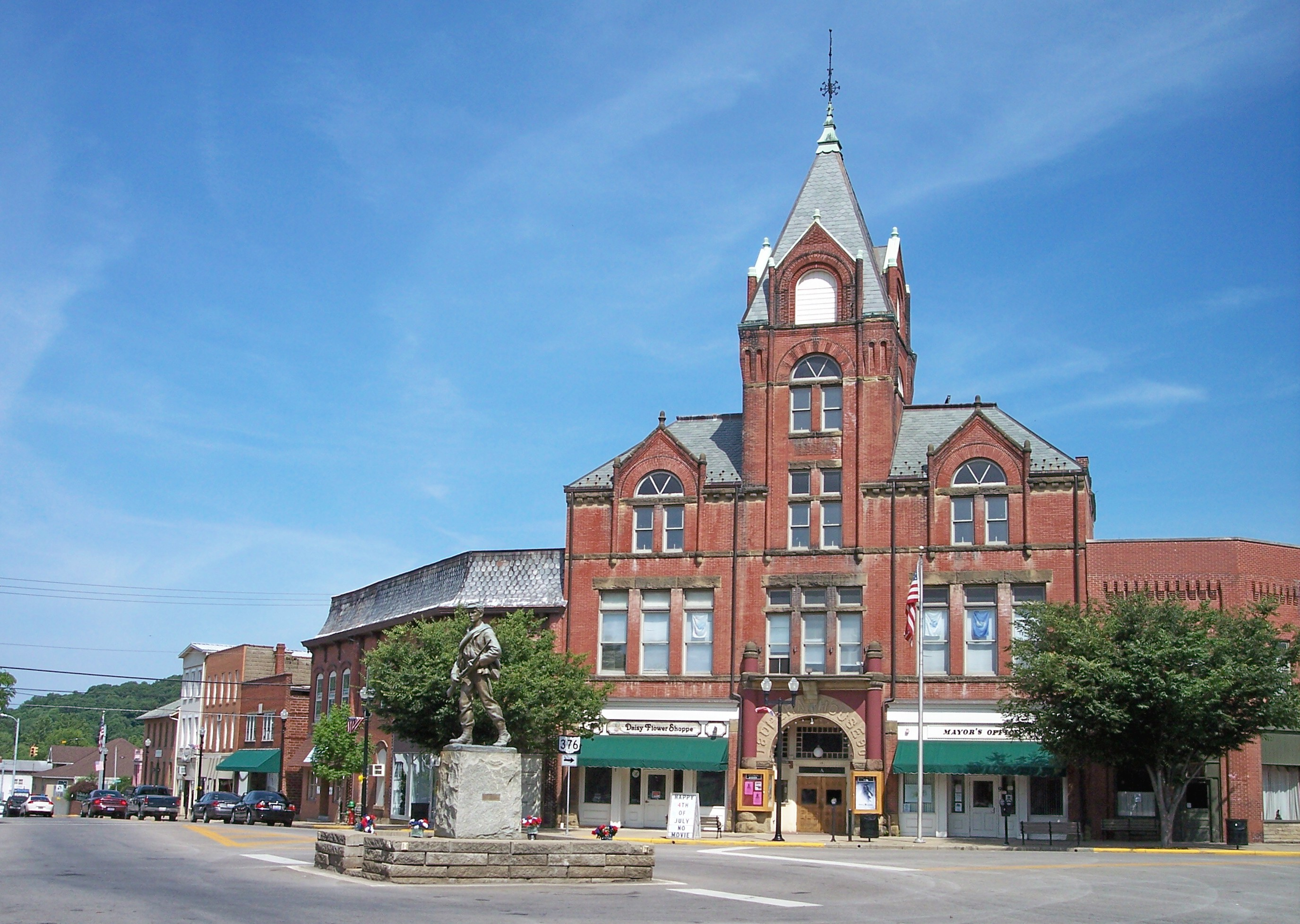
- Downtown McConnelsville
- Interactive map of McConnelsville, Ohio
- Location within Ohio Location within the United States
- Coordinates: 39°39′24″N 81°50′48″W
- Country: United States
- State: Ohio
- County: Morgan

Area
  - Total: 1.90 sq mi (4.92 km^{2})
  - Land: 1.79 sq mi (4.64 km^{2})
  - Water: 0.11 sq mi (0.28 km^{2})
- Elevation: 692 ft (211 m)

Population (2020)
  - Total: 1,667
  - Density: 929.9/sq mi (359.05/km^{2})
- Time zone: UTC-5 (Eastern (EST))
  - Summer (DST): UTC-4 (EDT)
- ZIP code: 43756
- Area code: 740
- FIPS code: 39-45822
- GNIS feature ID: 2399288
- Website: https://www.vomcc.com/

McConnelsville is a village in and the county seat of Morgan County, Ohio, United States, on the east bank of the Muskingum River. Located 21 miles (34 km) southeast of Zanesville and 26 miles (42 km) northwest of Marietta, the population was 1,667 at the 2020 census.

== History ==
McConnelsville was laid out in 1817 in Morgan Township, and named after Robert McConnell, the original owner of the town site.

== Geography ==
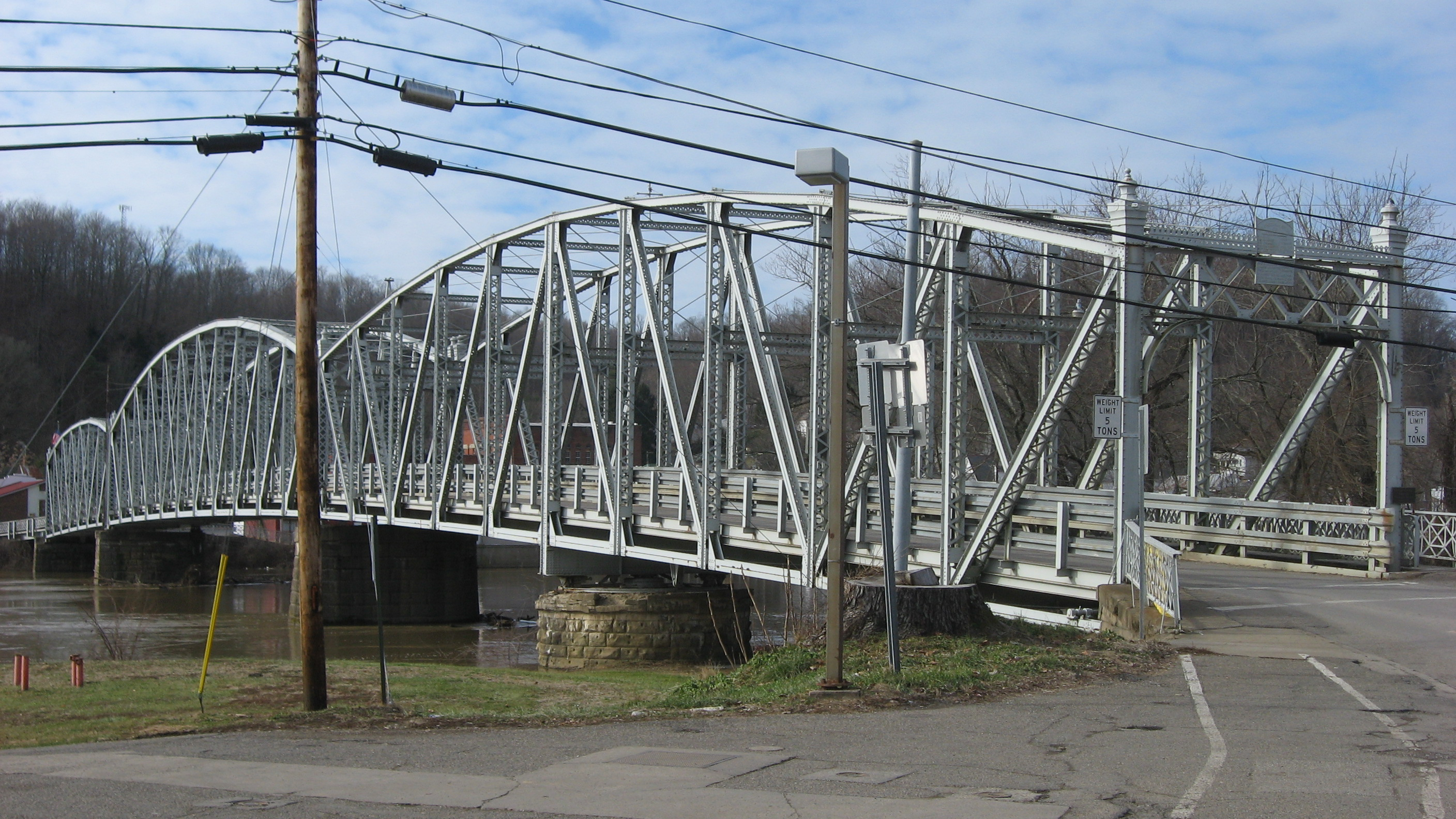
Morgan County Veterans Memorial Bridge

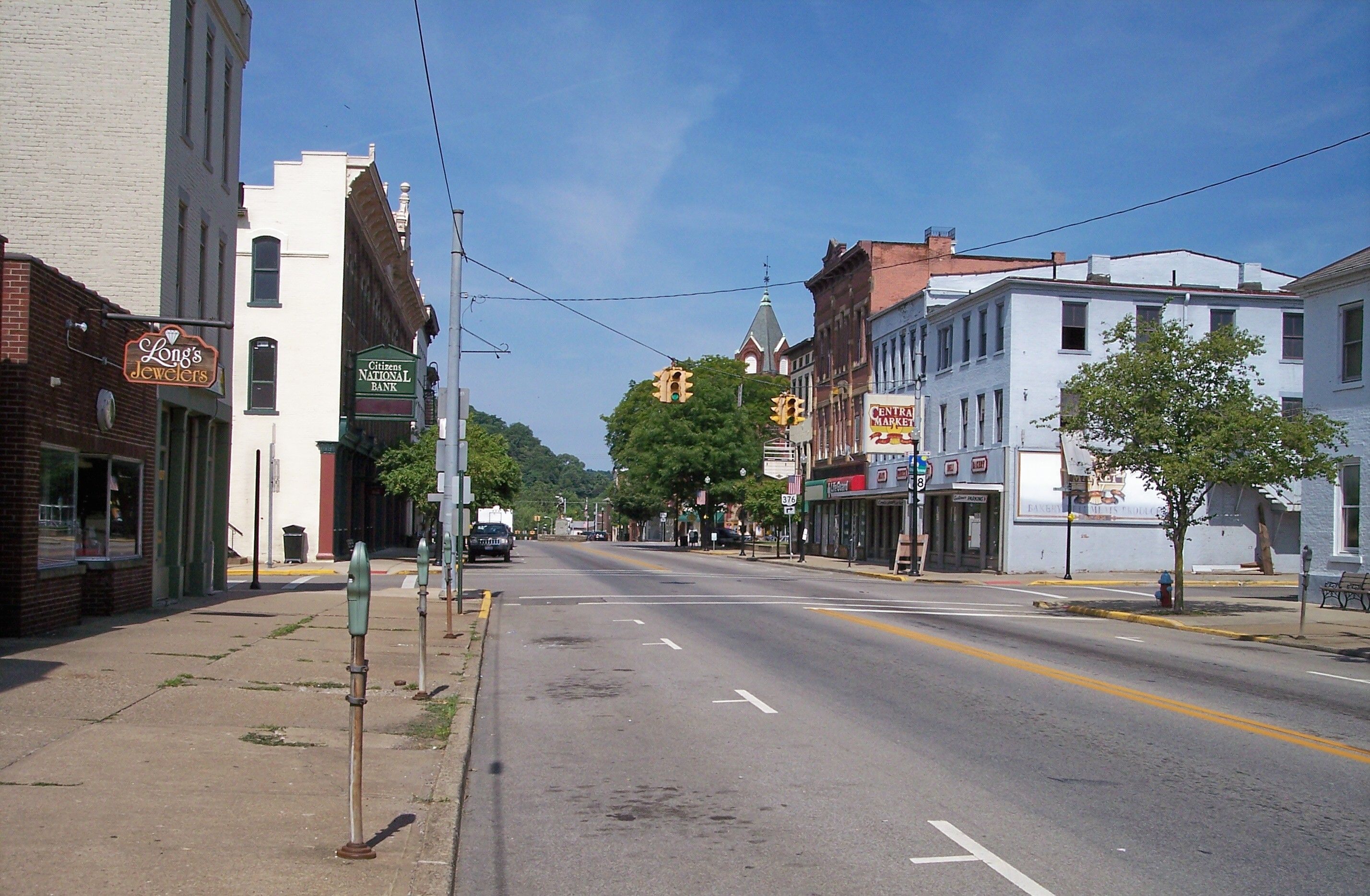
Main Street in McConnelsville in 2007

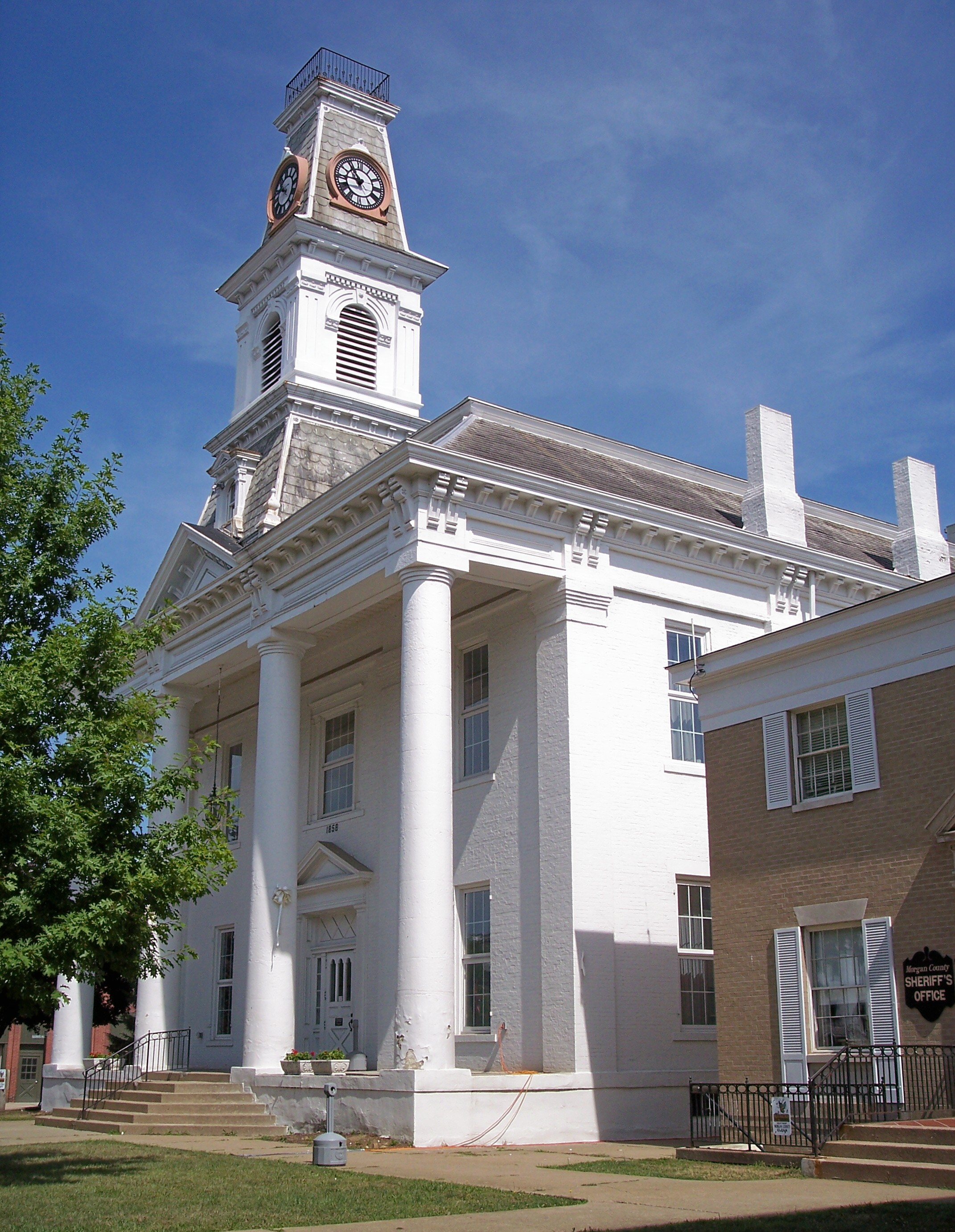
Morgan County Courthouse in 2007

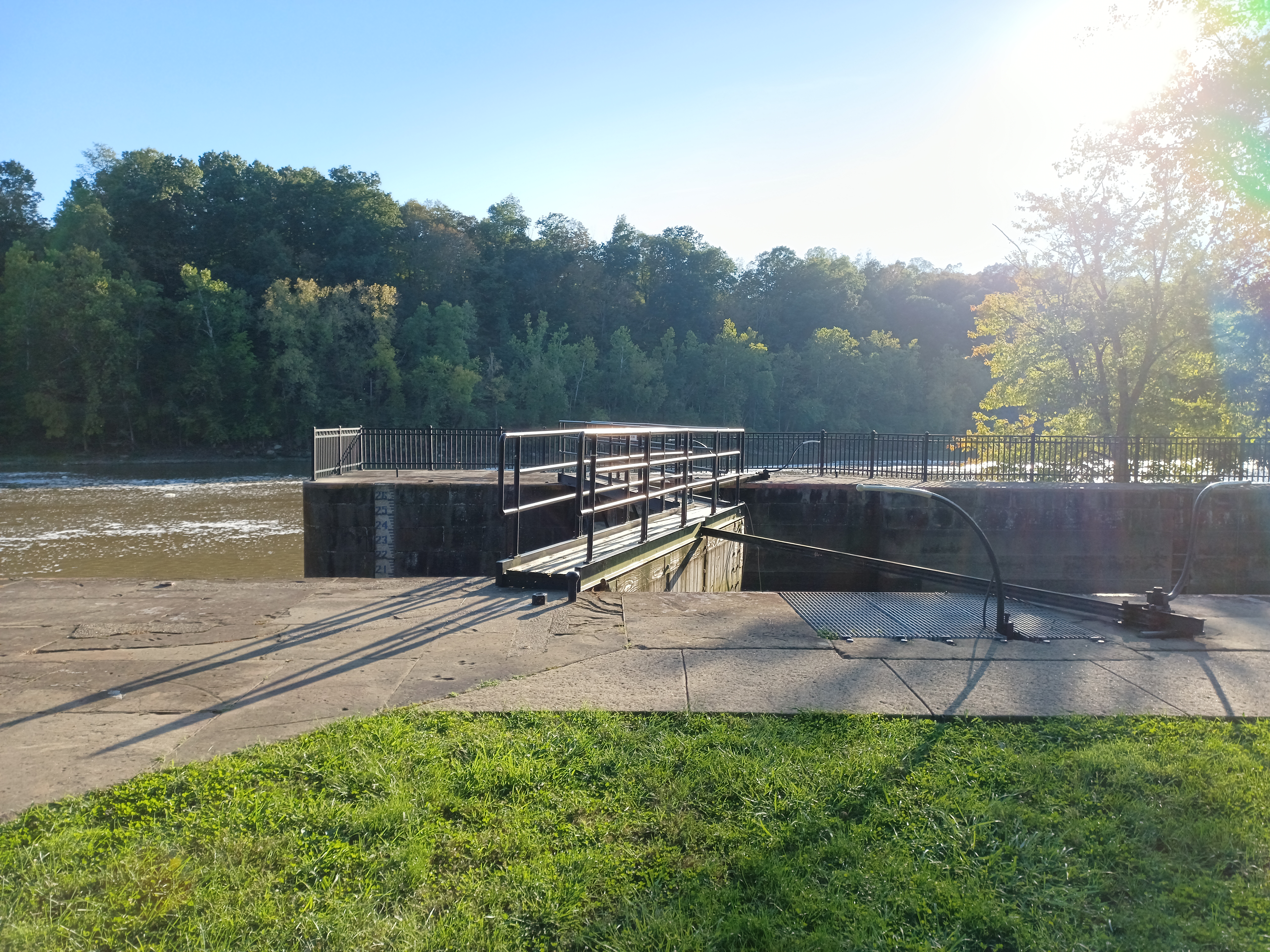
Muskingum River Lock No. 7

McConnelsville is located on the east bank of the Muskingum River, opposite Malta. There are two bridges across the river, on 3rd and 7th streets, the latter forming part of State Route 78.

According to the United States Census Bureau, the village has a total area of 1.90 square miles (4.92 km^{2}), of which 1.79 square miles (4.64 km^{2}) is land and 0.11 square miles (0.28 km^{2}) is water.

=== Climate ===
Climate data for McConnelsville, Ohio (1991–2020 normals, extremes 1893–present)
Month	Jan	Feb	Mar	Apr	May	Jun	Jul	Aug	Sep	Oct	Nov	Dec	Year
Record high °F (°C)	77 (25)	76 (24)	88 (31)	93 (34)	95 (35)	99 (37)	105 (41)	104 (40)	104 (40)	98 (37)	85 (29)	77 (25)	105 (41)
Mean daily maximum °F (°C)	38.8 (3.8)	42.2 (5.7)	52.0 (11.1)	65.0 (18.3)	73.1 (22.8)	80.4 (26.9)	83.8 (28.8)	83.4 (28.6)	77.9 (25.5)	66.2 (19.0)	53.6 (12.0)	43.1 (6.2)	63.3 (17.4)
Daily mean °F (°C)	29.5 (−1.4)	32.2 (0.1)	40.6 (4.8)	51.7 (10.9)	61.0 (16.1)	69.3 (20.7)	73.2 (22.9)	72.1 (22.3)	65.7 (18.7)	53.8 (12.1)	42.8 (6.0)	34.3 (1.3)	52.2 (11.2)
Mean daily minimum °F (°C)	20.2 (−6.6)	22.2 (−5.4)	29.2 (−1.6)	38.4 (3.6)	49.0 (9.4)	58.2 (14.6)	62.5 (16.9)	60.8 (16.0)	53.4 (11.9)	41.3 (5.2)	31.9 (−0.1)	25.5 (−3.6)	41.0 (5.0)
Record low °F (°C)	−32 (−36)	−29 (−34)	−11 (−24)	8 (−13)	23 (−5)	32 (0)	41 (5)	39 (4)	28 (−2)	17 (−8)	−5 (−21)	−18 (−28)	−32 (−36)
Average precipitation inches (mm)	3.64 (92)	2.83 (72)	3.85 (98)	4.21 (107)	4.36 (111)	4.63 (118)	4.65 (118)	3.90 (99)	3.41 (87)	3.11 (79)	3.02 (77)	3.35 (85)	44.96 (1,142)
Average snowfall inches (cm)	7.7 (20)	5.2 (13)	2.5 (6.4)	0.0 (0.0)	0.0 (0.0)	0.0 (0.0)	0.0 (0.0)	0.0 (0.0)	0.0 (0.0)	0.0 (0.0)	0.4 (1.0)	3.6 (9.1)	19.4 (49)
Average precipitation days (≥ 0.01 in)	13.4	10.4	11.7	13.2	13.4	11.6	11.9	10.0	8.8	9.5	11.1	12.6	137.6
Average snowy days (≥ 0.1 in)	4.7	3.6	1.4	0.2	0.0	0.0	0.0	0.0	0.0	0.0	0.5	3.1	13.5
Source: NOAA

== Demographics ==
Historical population
Census	Pop.	Note	%±
1820	151		—
1830	267		76.8%
1840	1,018		281.3%
1850	1,643		61.4%
1860	1,486		−9.6%
1870	1,646		10.8%
1880	1,473		−10.5%
1890	1,771		20.2%
1900	1,825		3.0%
1910	1,831		0.3%
1920	1,618		−11.6%
1930	1,754		8.4%
1940	1,895		8.0%
1950	1,941		2.4%
1960	2,257		16.3%
1970	2,107		−6.6%
1980	2,018		−4.2%
1990	1,804		−10.6%
2000	1,676		−7.1%
2010	1,784		6.4%
2020	1,667		−6.6%
U.S. Decennial Census

=== 2010 census ===
As of the census of 2010, there were 1,784 people, 765 households, and 404 families living in the village. The population density was 996.6 inhabitants per square mile (384.8/km^{2}). There were 870 housing units at an average density of 486.0 per square mile (187.6/km^{2}). The racial makeup of the village was 93.3% White, 2.4% African American, 0.7% Native American, 0.4% Asian, 0.6% from other races, and 2.6% from two or more races. Hispanic or Latino of any race were 1.3% of the population.

There were 765 households, of which 24.2% had children under the age of 18 living with them, 36.9% were married couples living together, 12.2% had a female householder with no husband present, 3.8% had a male householder with no wife present, and 47.2% were non-families. 42.2% of all households were made up of individuals, and 22.4% had someone living alone who was 65 years of age or older. The average household size was 2.17 and the average family size was 2.99.

The median age in the village was 47.1 years. 20.1% of residents were under the age of 18; 8.8% were between the ages of 18 and 24; 18.9% were from 25 to 44; 26.9% were from 45 to 64; and 25.4% were 65 years of age or older. The gender makeup of the village was 45.1% male and 54.9% female.

=== 2000 census ===
As of the census of 2000, there were 1,676 people, 805 households, and 445 families living in the village. The population density was 953.7 inhabitants per square mile (368.2/km^{2}). There were 881 housing units at an average density of 501.3 per square mile (193.6/km^{2}). The racial makeup of the village was 95.70% White, 1.49% African American, 0.48% Native American, 0.06% Asian, 0.42% from other races, and 1.85% from two or more races. Hispanic or Latino of any race were 0.24% of the population.

There were 805 households, out of which 25.0% had children under the age of 18 living with them, 40.5% were married couples living together, 11.4% had a female householder with no husband present, and 44.6% were non-families. 42.4% of all households were made up of individuals, and 26.2% had someone living alone who was 65 years of age or older. The average household size was 2.08 and the average family size was 2.84.

In the village, the population was spread out, with 22.8% under the age of 18, 6.6% from 18 to 24, 24.6% from 25 to 44, 22.7% from 45 to 64, and 23.3% who were 65 years of age or older. The median age was 42 years. For every 100 females there were 77.9 males. For every 100 females age 18 and over, there were 70.7 males.

The median income for a household in the village was $25,563, and the median income for a family was $39,769. Males had a median income of $31,615 versus $19,537 for females. The per capita income for the village was $17,818. About 13.7% of families and 18.1% of the population were below the poverty line, including 27.0% of those under age 18 and 14.4% of those age 65 or over.

== Education ==
=== Primary and secondary schools ===
McConnelsville is served by the Morgan Local School District which consists of three elementary schools (grades K-6), one junior high school (grades 7–8), and one high school (grades 9–12). Located three miles south of McConnelsville, the current Morgan High School building was built in 1966 and is home to the "Morgan Raiders".

=== Libraries ===
McConnelsville is served by the central branch of The Kate Love Simpson Morgan County Library located on Main Street. The library originated in 1920 as a member-driven library association; a $5 annual contribution plus a physician's certificate of good health were needed to join the association. In 1934, the library opened its doors to all residents of Morgan County. The library was previously housed in the 1859 Simpson House. The current building was built in 1997 and includes a bookmobile garage and a community meeting room.

== Points of interest ==
- Big Muskie Bucket -- located in nearby Miners Memorial Park, the bucket is what remains from the famed coal mining dragline, Big Muskie.
- Morgan County Courthouse -- located in downtown McConnelsville, the Greek Revival style building was designed by architect William P. Johnson and built in 1858 at a cost of $10,000. The building is still in use and today, housing the Morgan County Court of Common Pleas and its probate and juvenile divisions. The courthouse is rumored to be haunted by a former attorney who shot himself in his courthouse office.
- Morgan County Veterans' Memorial Bridge -- built in 1913, the bridge spans the Muskingum River between Malta and McConnelsville and is part of the Muskingum River Navigation Historic District.
- Opera House -- located on the northwest corner of the public square, the building was built in 1892 and was one of the first buildings in the county to be lit by electric light. A variety of productions, traveling shows, performers, and celebrities have appeared in the Opera House: Reverend Billy Sunday, William Jennings Bryan, and Senator Albert Beveridge spoke there.

== Notable people ==
- Frederick Samuel Dellenbaugh – American explorer, writer, and topographer of the Colorado River, Alaska, and Siberia
- James M. Gaylord, U.S. Representative from Ohio
- James J. Gibson – American psychologist
- William Lawrence – Republican politician involved with the attempt to impeach Andrew Johnson
- Lelia N. Morris - hymnwriter
- James Ball Naylor, teacher, country doctor, columnist, novelist, poet, humorist, and lecturer
- Seth Thomas – appointed to the United States Court of Appeals for the Eighth Circuit by President Franklin D. Roosevelt
- Thomas Tipton – former Senator from Nebraska
