= Chesterhill, Ohio =

- Village
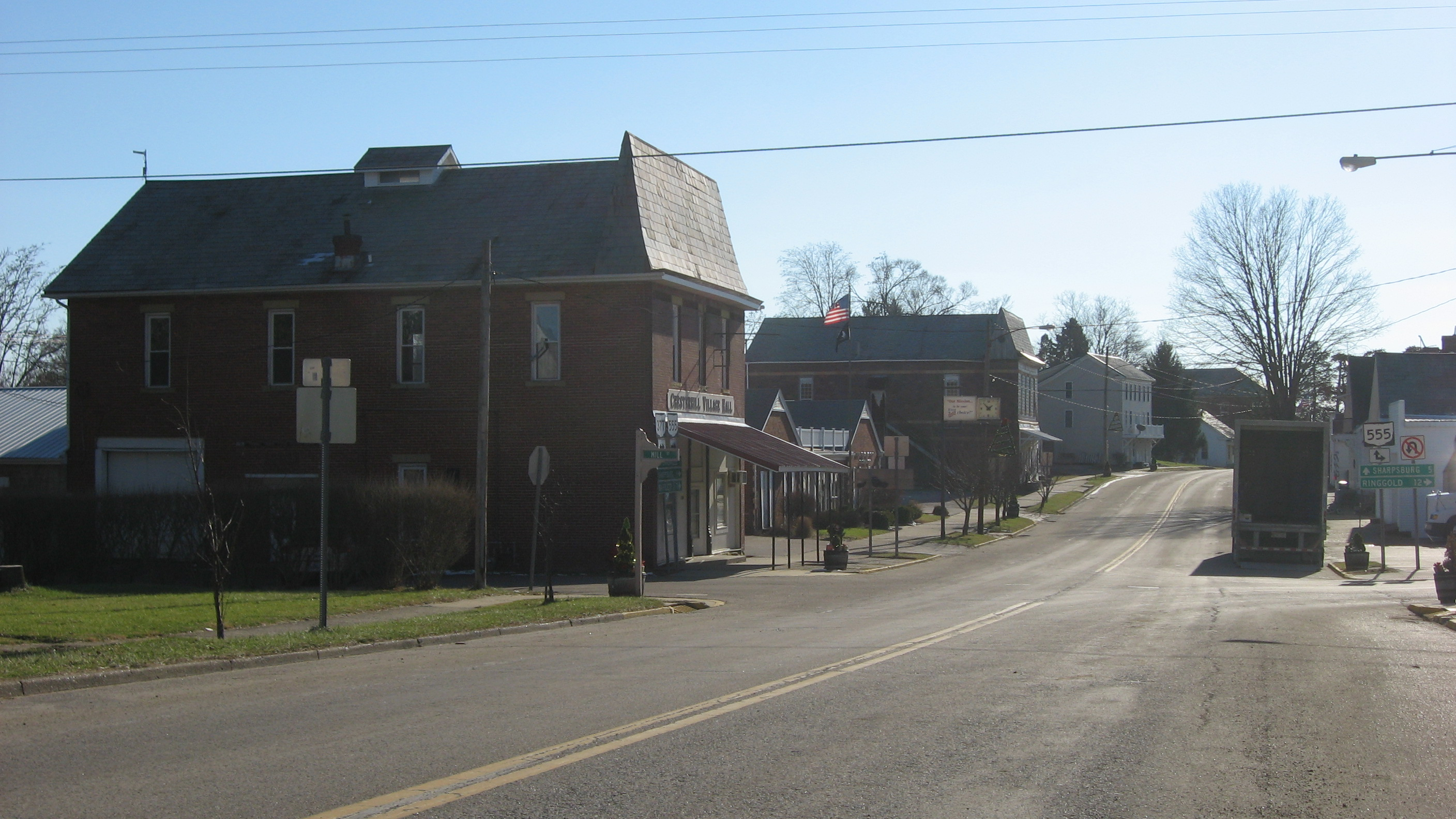
- Marion Street downtown

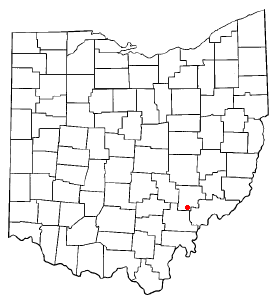
- Location of Chesterhill, Ohio

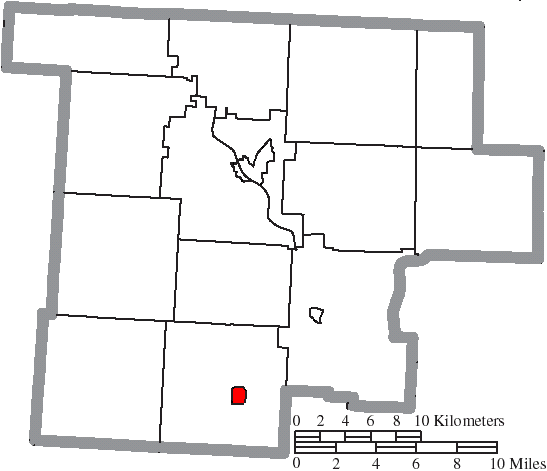
- Location of Chesterhill in Morgan County
- Coordinates: 39°29′27″N 81°52′00″W
- Country: United States
- State: Ohio
- County: Morgan

Area
  - Total: 0.54 sq mi (1.41 km^{2})
  - Land: 0.54 sq mi (1.40 km^{2})
  - Water: 0.0039 sq mi (0.01 km^{2})
- Elevation: 971 ft (296 m)

Population (2020)
  - Total: 276
  - Estimate (2023): 268
  - Density: 511.6/sq mi (197.53/km^{2})
- Time zone: UTC-5 (Eastern (EST))
  - Summer (DST): UTC-4 (EDT)
- ZIP code: 43728
- Area code: 740
- FIPS code: 39-14086
- GNIS feature ID: 2397618
- Website: https://chesterhillohio.com/

Chesterhill is a village in Morgan County, Ohio, United States. The population was 276 at the 2020 census.

== History ==
Chesterhill was laid out in 1834, and named after Chester County, Pennsylvania, the native home of a large share of the first settlers.

Chesterhill played a role in the Underground Railroad; escaped slaves were sheltered in Henman Cave and by Quaker families, led by individuals such as Elias Bundy, Jesse Hiatt, and Nathan Morris.

== Geography ==
According to the United States Census Bureau, the village has a total area of 0.54 square miles (1.40 km^{2}), all land.

== Demographics ==
Historical population
Census	Pop.	Note	%±
1900	480		—
1910	410		−14.6%
1920	427		4.1%
1930	431		0.9%
1940	442		2.6%
1950	426		−3.6%
1960	876		105.6%
1970	361		−58.8%
1980	395		9.4%
1990	309		−21.8%
2000	305		−1.3%
2010	289		−5.2%
2020	276		−4.5%
2023 (est.)	268	▼	−2.9%
U.S. Decennial Census

=== 2010 census ===
As of the census of 2010, there were 289 people, 121 households, and 84 families living in the village. The population density was 535.2 inhabitants per square mile (206.6/km^{2}). There were 143 housing units at an average density of 264.8 per square mile (102.2/km^{2}). The racial makeup of the village was 73.7% White, 9.7% African American, 0.3% Native American, 0.3% Asian, 0.3% from other races, and 15.6% from two or more races. Hispanic or Latino of any race were 0.3% of the population.

There were 121 households, of which 33.9% had children under the age of 18 living with them, 54.5% were married couples living together, 11.6% had a female householder with no husband present, 3.3% had a male householder with no wife present, and 30.6% were non-families. 28.1% of all households were made up of individuals, and 14.9% had someone living alone who was 65 years of age or older. The average household size was 2.39 and the average family size was 2.89.

The median age in the village was 41.4 years. 25.3% of residents were under the age of 18; 4.4% were between the ages of 18 and 24; 26.4% were from 25 to 44; 25.3% were from 45 to 64; and 18.7% were 65 years of age or older. The gender makeup of the village was 47.4% male and 52.6% female.

=== 2000 census ===
As of the census of 2000, there were 305 people, 131 households, and 91 families living in the village. The population density was 560.8 inhabitants per square mile (216.5/km^{2}). There were 146 housing units at an average density of 268.4 per square mile (103.6/km^{2}). The racial makeup of the village was 79.02% White, 15.41% African American, and 5.57% from two or more races. Hispanic or Latino of any race were 0.33% of the population.

There were 131 households, out of which 31.3% had children under the age of 18 living with them, 51.9% were married couples living together, 11.5% had a female householder with no husband present, and 29.8% were non-families. 28.2% of all households were made up of individuals, and 14.5% had someone living alone who was 65 years of age or older. The average household size was 2.33 and the average family size was 2.78.

In the village, the population was spread out, with 23.0% under the age of 18, 9.5% from 18 to 24, 29.8% from 25 to 44, 21.3% from 45 to 64, and 16.4% who were 65 years of age or older. The median age was 38 years. For every 100 females there were 96.8 males. For every 100 females age 18 and over, there were 89.5 males.

The median income for a household in the village was $33,750, and the median income for a family was $45,833. Males had a median income of $33,636 versus $20,536 for females. The per capita income for the village was $17,329. About 14.0% of families and 19.8% of the population were below the poverty line, including 34.5% of those under the age of eighteen and 18.2% of those 65 or over.

== Education ==
Chesterhill has a public library, a branch of the Kate Love Simpson Morgan County Library.
