= Malta, Ohio =

- Village
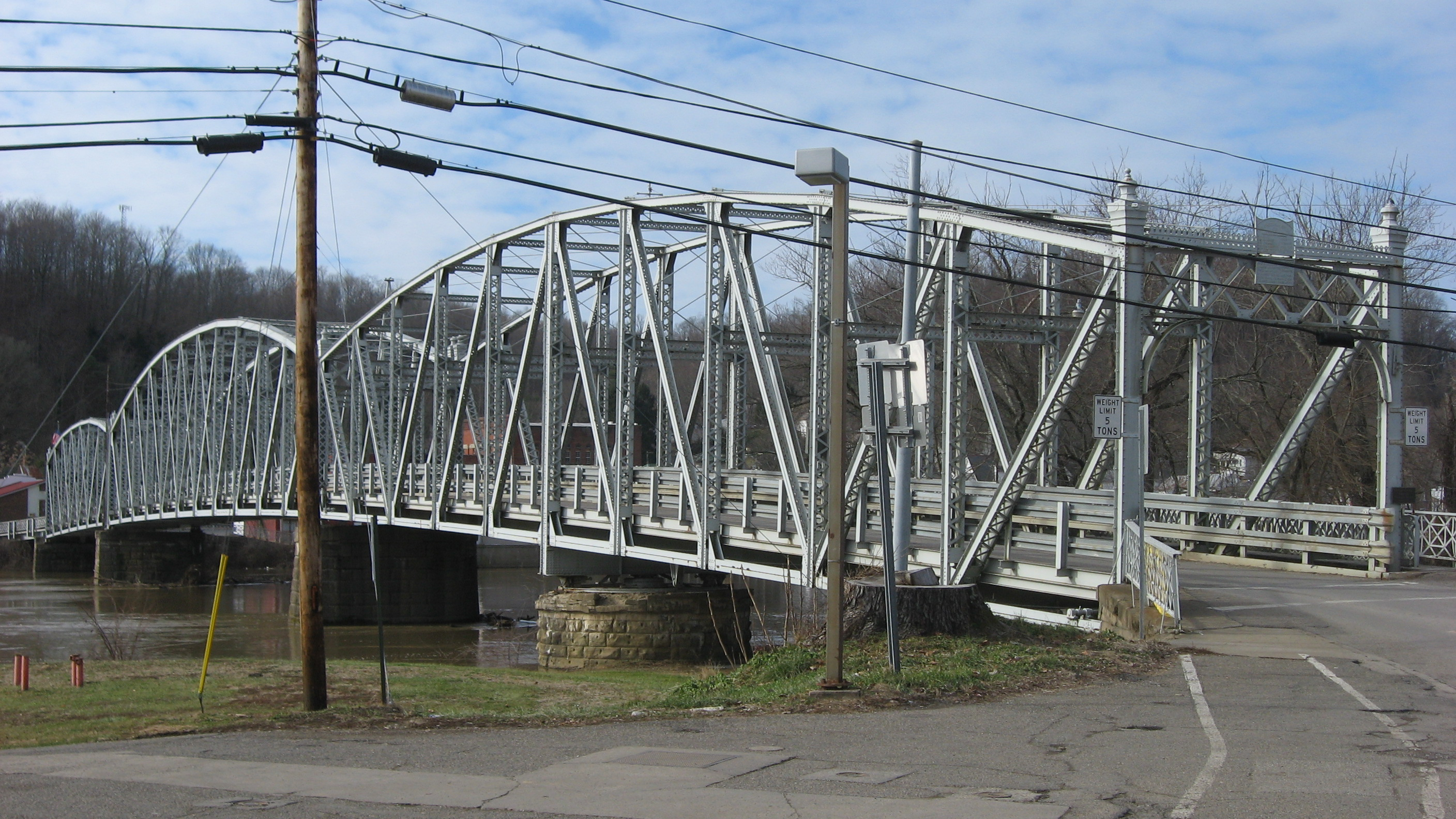
- The Morgan County Veterans' Memorial Bridge, which connects Malta to McConnelsville

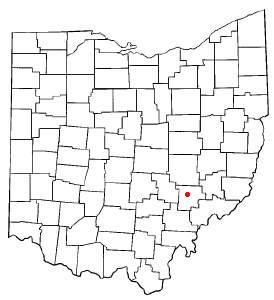
- Location of Malta, Ohio

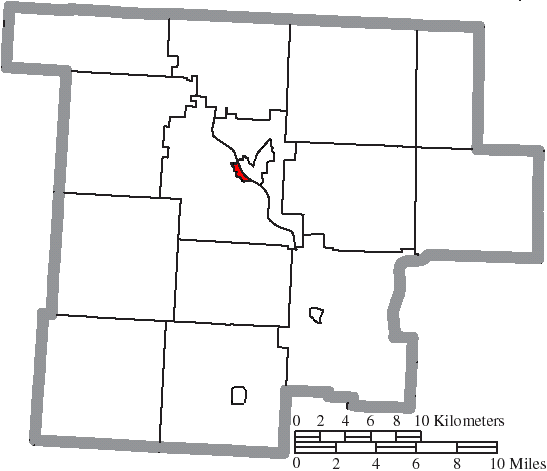
- Location of Malta in Morgan County
- Coordinates: 39°39′06″N 81°51′51″W
- Country: United States
- State: Ohio
- County: Morgan

Area
  - Total: 0.39 sq mi (1.00 km^{2})
  - Land: 0.34 sq mi (0.89 km^{2})
  - Water: 0.042 sq mi (0.11 km^{2})
- Elevation: 669 ft (204 m)

Population (2020)
  - Total: 559
  - Density: 1,627.9/sq mi (628.52/km^{2})
- Time zone: UTC-5 (Eastern (EST))
  - Summer (DST): UTC-4 (EDT)
- ZIP code: 43758
- Area code: 740
- FIPS code: 39-46970
- GNIS feature ID: 2399233
- Website: https://maltavillage.com/

Malta is a village in Morgan County, Ohio, United States. The population was 559 at the 2020 census.

== History ==
Malta was laid out in 1816 and named by an early settler who had visited the island of Malta during his time as a sailor. The village developed throughout the 19th century due to its strategic location on the Muskingum River, which became a significant transportation and trade route after the construction of a system of locks and dams between 1836 and 1841.

One of the village’s most notable historical structures is the Morgan County Dungeon, a small stone jail believed to have been built in the 1830s. Measuring approximately 11 feet long, 5 feet wide, and 12 feet high, it was used to confine individuals convicted of crimes such as larceny, rioting, and adultery. The dungeon was rediscovered during construction in 1964 and later relocated and preserved on Main Street. It is now marked by an Ohio Historical Marker.

== Geography ==
Malta is located on the west side of the Muskingum River, opposite McConnelsville.

According to the United States Census Bureau, the village has a total area of 0.38 square miles (0.98 km^{2}), of which 0.34 square miles (0.88 km^{2}) is land and 0.04 square miles (0.10 km^{2}) is water.

== Demographics ==
Historical population
Census	Pop.	Note	%±
1830	64		—
1850	528		—
1860	570		8.0%
1870	513		−10.0%
1880	652		27.1%
1890	865		32.7%
1900	845		−2.3%
1910	971		14.9%
1920	885		−8.9%
1930	932		5.3%
1940	938		0.6%
1950	968		3.2%
1960	983		1.5%
1970	1,017		3.5%
1980	956		−6.0%
1990	802		−16.1%
2000	696		−13.2%
2010	671		−3.6%
2020	559		−16.7%
U.S. Decennial Census

=== 2010 census ===
As of the census of 2010, there were 671 people, 278 households, and 174 families living in the village. The population density was 1,973.5 inhabitants per square mile (762.0/km^{2}). There were 305 housing units at an average density of 897.1 per square mile (346.4/km^{2}). The racial makeup of the village was 91.1% White, 4.0% African American, 0.1% from other races, and 4.8% from two or more races. Hispanic or Latino of any race were 0.3% of the population.

There were 278 households, of which 33.1% had children under the age of 18 living with them, 42.1% were married couples living together, 15.8% had a female householder with no husband present, 4.7% had a male householder with no wife present, and 37.4% were non-families. 30.9% of all households were made up of individuals, and 12.2% had someone living alone who was 65 years of age or older. The average household size was 2.41 and the average family size was 2.97.

The median age in the village was 36 years. 27.3% of residents were under the age of 18; 7.3% were between the ages of 18 and 24; 26% were from 25 to 44; 24.7% were from 45 to 64; and 14.8% were 65 years of age or older. The gender makeup of the village was 49.0% male and 51.0% female.

=== 2000 census ===
As of the census of 2000, there were 696 people, 283 households, and 198 families living in the village. The population density was 2,241.1 inhabitants per square mile (865.3/km^{2}). There were 318 housing units at an average density of 1,023.9 per square mile (395.3/km^{2}). The racial makeup of the village was 90.80% White, 5.75% African American, 0.29% Asian, 0.29% from other races, and 2.87% from two or more races. Hispanic or Latino of any race were 0.14% of the population.

There were 283 households, out of which 34.3% had children under the age of 18 living with them, 43.8% were married couples living together, 22.6% had a female householder with no husband present, and 30.0% were non-families. 27.2% of all households were made up of individuals, and 14.1% had someone living alone who was 65 years of age or older. The average household size was 2.39 and the average family size was 2.85.

In the village, the population was spread out, with 27.7% under the age of 18, 7.9% from 18 to 24, 24.9% from 25 to 44, 23.3% from 45 to 64, and 16.2% who were 65 years of age or older. The median age was 39 years. For every 100 females there were 84.6 males. For every 100 females age 18 and over, there were 77.7 males.

The median income for a household in the village was $23,611, and the median income for a family was $27,083. Males had a median income of $28,125 versus $18,542 for females. The per capita income for the village was $10,703. About 23.3% of families and 25.3% of the population were below the poverty line, including 36.9% of those under age 18 and 13.3% of those age 65 or over.

== Economy ==
=== Malta Dynamics ===
Malta is home to Malta Dynamics, a manufacturer specializing in fall protection systems and safety gear. Founded in 2015, the company designs and produces OSHA-compliant harnesses, lifelines, anchors, and mobile fall arrest systems used in construction, aviation, and industrial settings. It is headquartered at 210 13th Street in Malta and employs approximately 11 to 50 people.

== Landmarks ==
The Morgan County Dungeon is a preserved 19th-century stone jail, rediscovered in 1964 during excavation work. It was later relocated to Main Street and is now marked with an official Ohio Historical Marker.

Rock Hollow School is a one-room schoolhouse originally built in 1877. It was relocated and restored as a historical site reflecting rural education in the 19th century.

The Helmick Mill Covered Bridge, constructed in 1867 using a multiple kingpost truss design, is listed on the National Register of Historic Places.

The Adams Covered Bridge, located near Malta, is another historic wooden bridge recognized on the National Register of Historic Places. Events

Each July, Malta and neighboring McConnelsville host Civil War Encampment Days, a weekend event featuring reenactments, period encampments, cannon demonstrations, and historical education activities. The event draws local and regional visitors and commemorates the area’s Civil War heritage.

== Notable people ==
- Homer M. Carr - Minnesota state legislator
- Rufus R. Dawes - officer in the Union Army during the American Civil War
- Sarah Jane Dawes Shedd - sister of Rufus R. Dawes, missionary in Persia
- W. Lee O'Daniel - former Governor of Texas
- Jeremiah McLain Rusk - former Governor of Wisconsin
