= Muskingum River =

Coordinates: 39°24′33″N 81°27′22″W

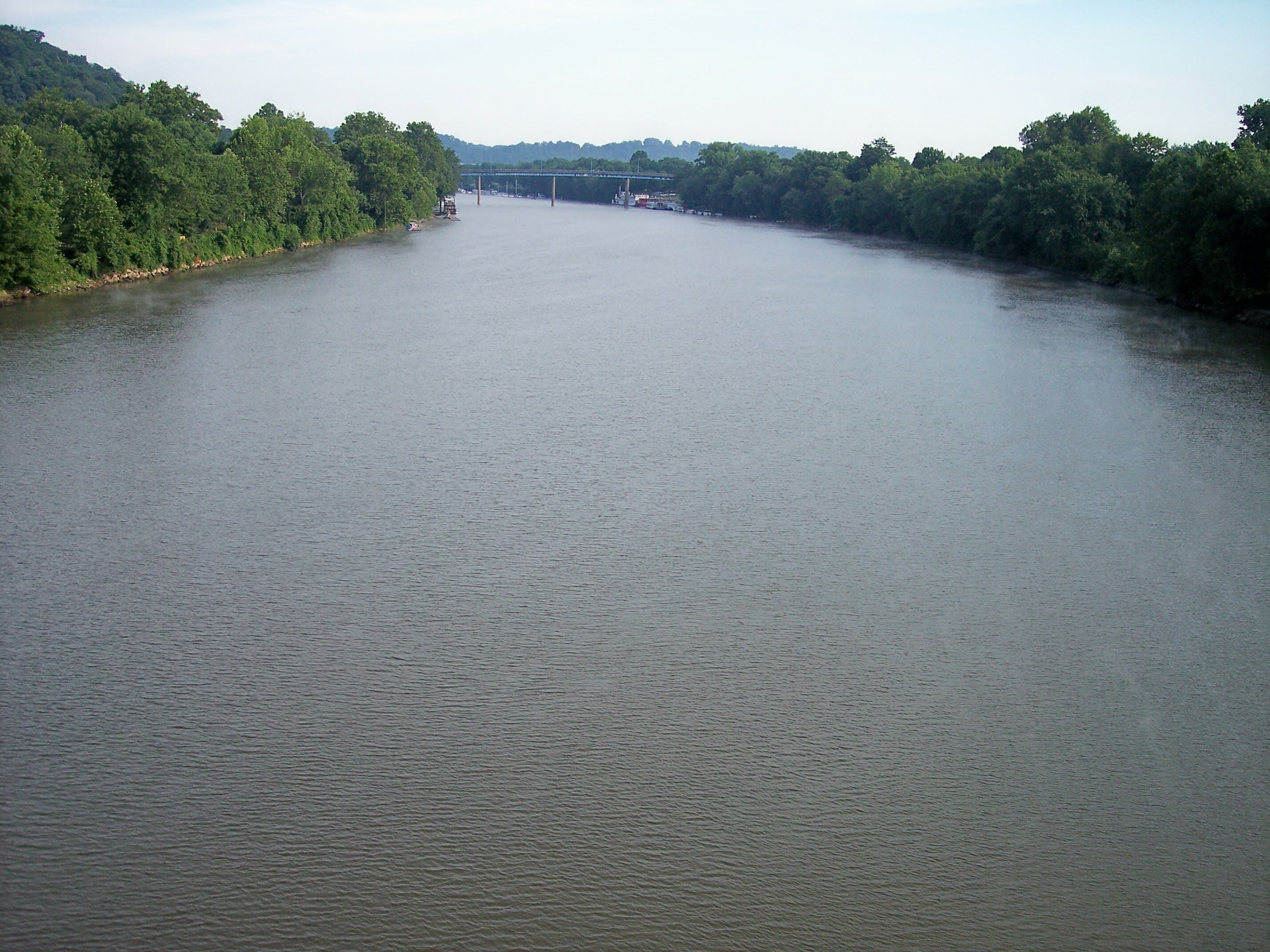
- The Muskingum River near its mouth in Marietta, Ohio
- Native name: Wakatamothiipi (Shawnee)

Location
- Country: United States

Physical characteristics
- Source
  - location: Confluence of the Tuscarawas and Walhonding Rivers
- Mouth
  - location: Ohio River at Marietta, Ohio
  - elevation: 582 ft (177 m)
- Length: 111 mi (179 km)
- Basin size: 8,051 mi^{2} (20,850 km^{2})
- Discharge
  - location: mouth
  - average: 9,459.49 cu ft/s (267.863 m^{3}/s) (estimate)
- Muskingum River Navigation Historic District
- U.S. National Register of Historic Places
- U.S. Historic district
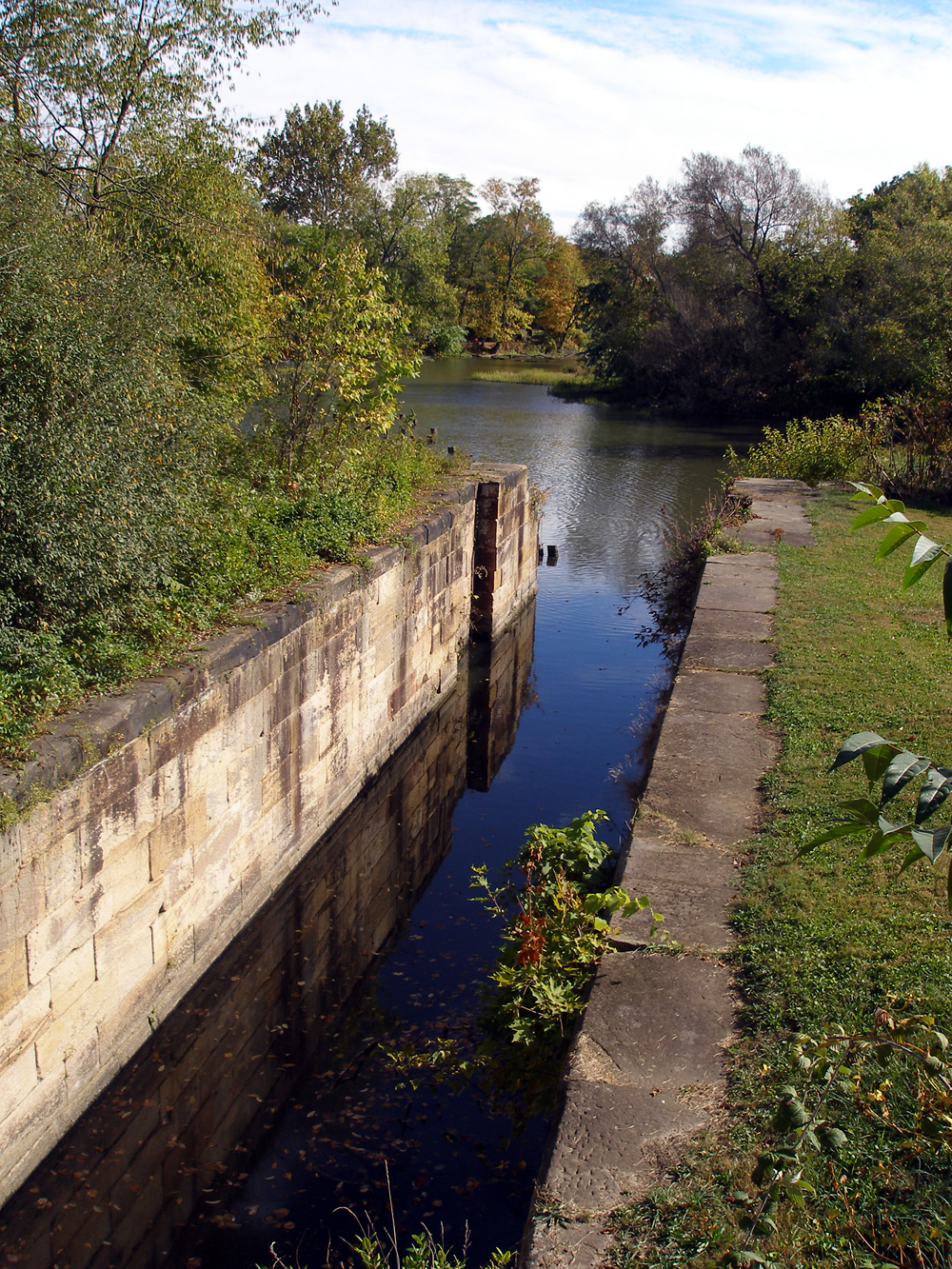

- Location within Ohio Location within the United States
- Location: Coshocton, Muskingum, Morgan, Washington counties
- Area: 6,004 acres (24.30 km^{2})
- Built: 1816
- Architect: Bates, David; Curtis, Samuel, et al.
- NRHP reference No.: 07000025
- Added to NRHP: February 9, 2007

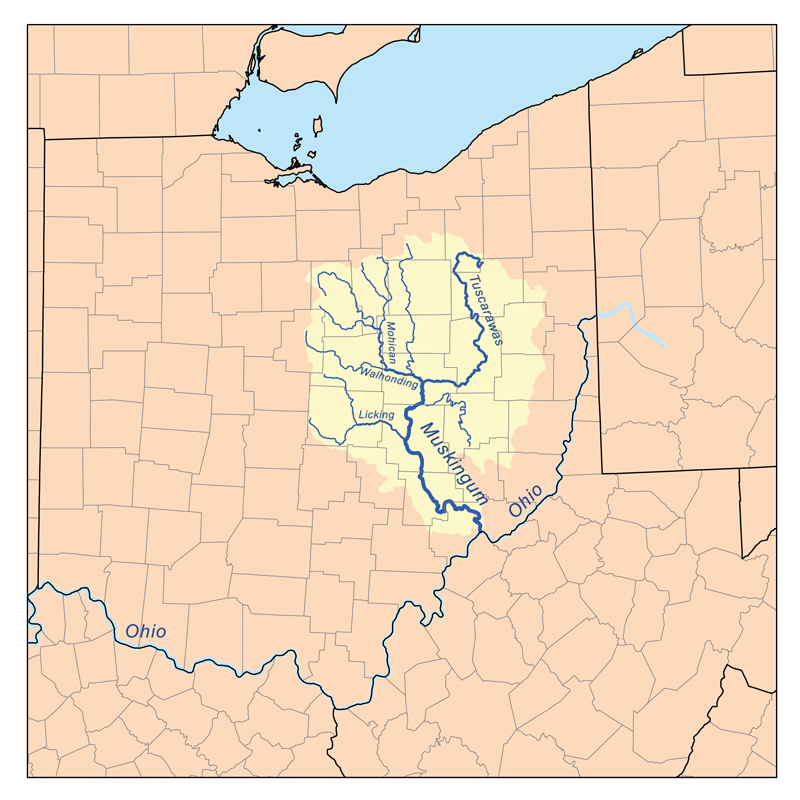
Map of the Muskingum River watershed

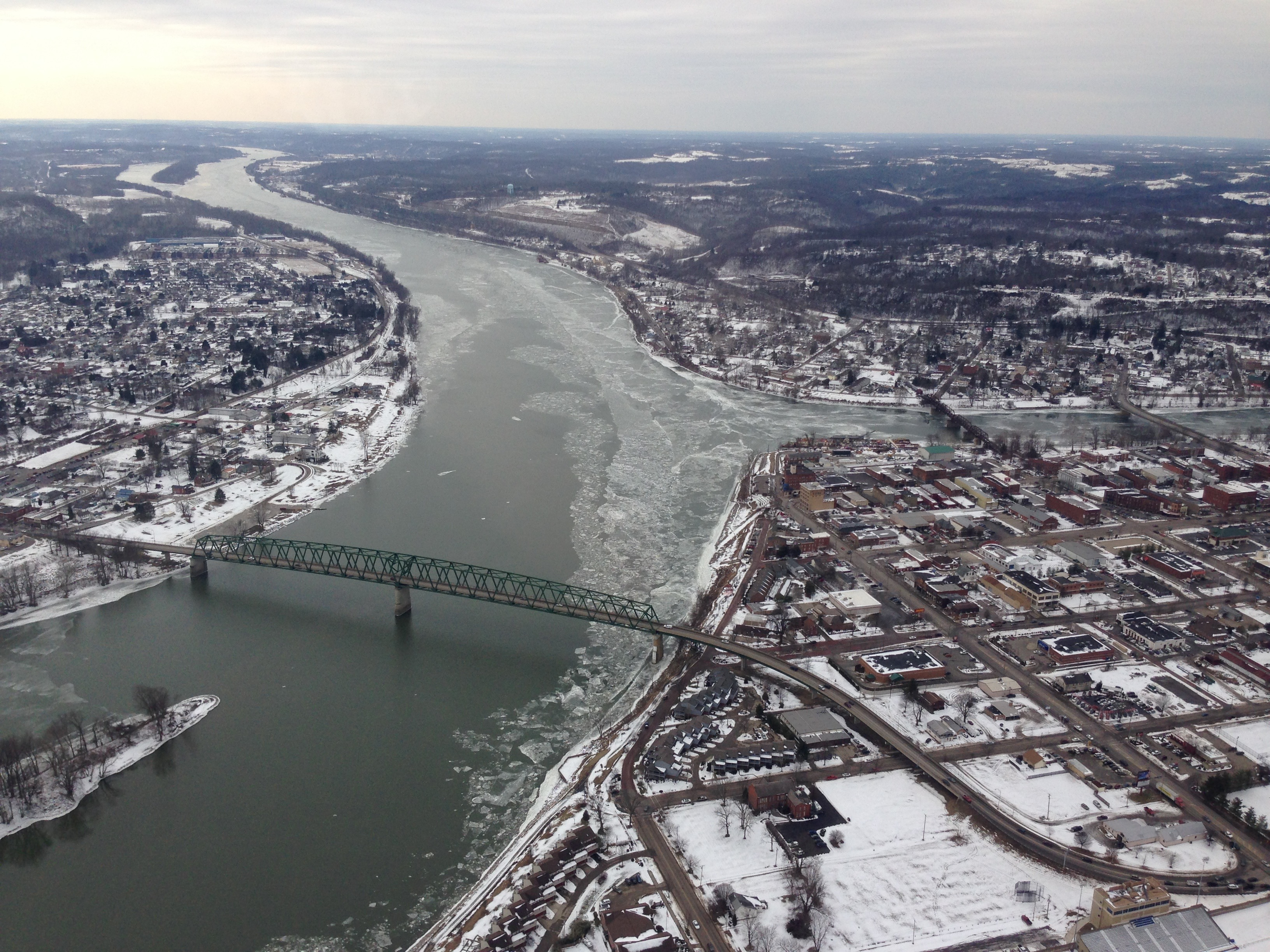
Aerial view of the Ohio and Muskingum Rivers at Marietta, Ohio

The Muskingum River (/məˈskɪŋ(ɡ)əm/ mə-SKING-(g)əm; Shawnee: Wakatamothiipi) is a tributary of the Ohio River, approximately 111 miles (179 km) long, in southeastern Ohio in the United States. An important commercial route in the 19th century, it flows generally southward through the eastern hill country of Ohio. Via the Ohio, it is part of the Mississippi River watershed. The river is navigable for much of its length through a series of locks and dams.

== Course ==
The Muskingum is formed at Coshocton in east-central Ohio by the confluence of the Walhonding and Tuscarawas rivers. It flows in a meandering course southward past Conesville and Dresden to Zanesville, and then southeastward past South Zanesville, Philo, Gaysport, Malta, McConnelsville, Beverly, Lowell, Stockport and Devola. It joins the Ohio at Marietta.

Along its course the Muskingum collects Wills Creek near Conesville; Wakatomika Creek at Dresden; the Licking River at Zanesville; Moxahala Creek at South Zanesville; and Wolf Creek near Beverly.

== History ==
The name Muskingum derives from the Shawnee word mshkikwam 'swampy ground'. In Lenape Muskingum was taken to mean 'elk's eye' (mus wəshkinkw) by folk etymology, from mus 'elk' + wəshkinkw 'its eye'. Moravian missionary David Zeisberger wrote that the Muskingum River was called Elk's Eye "because of the numbers of elk that formerly fed on its banks, these animals being found there even at the present time [1779-1780]..." Historically, it was also the name of a large Wyandot town along the river.

As part of an expedition to assert French dominance throughout the entire Ohio valley, on August 15, 1749, a leaden plate claiming the region for France was buried at the confluence of the Muskingum and Ohio rivers by Pierre Joseph Céloron.

Noted frontier explorer Christopher Gist reached the Big Sandy Creek tributary of the river on December 4, 1751. Traveling downriver, he recorded arriving on December 14 at the western Wyandot town of Muskingum, at present-day Coshocton. There he remained for the following month.

Marietta was founded in 1788 as the first permanent American settlement in the Northwest Territory, at the mouth of the Muskingum River on the Ohio River. The Big Bottom Massacre occurred along its banks in 1791.

Zanesville was settled by European Americans in 1799 at the site where Zane's Trace crossed the Muskingum at the mouth of the Licking River. Later, the National (Cumberland) Road crossed the Muskingum at Zanesville. In the mid-19th century the Muskingum was an important commercial shipping route, with dams and locks controlling the water level to allow boats to travel up and down the river. With the decrease in use of water-based transportation in Ohio by the 1920s, the locks fell into disrepair.

In 1958, the Ohio Department of Natural Resources designated the entire river as Muskingum River State Park.

Since the 1960s, the locks have been repaired to enable pleasure craft to travel the entire navigable length of the river. The Muskingum waterway is one of the few remaining systems in the US to use hand-operated river locks. The navigation system was designated a national Historic Civil Engineering Landmark by the American Society of Civil Engineers in 2001. In 2006, it was designated "An Ohio Water Trail;" this designation provides for increased canoe access on the river. The navigable portion of the river was listed on the National Register of Historic Places in 2007 as the Muskingum River Navigation Historic District; the listing includes 12 contributing buildings, 32 contributing structures, and a contributing site. It was the first such designated Navigation Historic District in the United States.

Located north of the Mason–Dixon line, from around 1812 to 1861 the Muskingum River was a major Underground Railroad route used by fugitive slaves escaping from the South on their journey north to Lake Erie and Canada.

== Nonprofit organizations ==
The Friends of the Lower Muskingum River is a 501 (c) (3) nonprofit land trust based in Marietta, Ohio, concerned with protection of the Muskingum River and adjacent lands. The Muskingum Watershed Conservancy District is a quasi-governmental entity concerned with flood control on the river.

== Variant names ==
According to the Geographic Names Information System, the Muskingum River has also been known as:

- Big Muskingum River
- Elk River
- Mouskindom River
- Mushkingum River
- Muskingham River
- Riviere Chiagnez

== See also ==
- List of rivers of Ohio
- Muskingum River Power Plant
- Y-Bridge (Zanesville, Ohio)
