= List of former state routes in Ohio (354–568) =

This is a list of former state routes in Ohio since 1923 with route numbers from 354 through 568 inclusive.

== SR 354 ==
State Route 354
- Location: New Garden–Lisbon
- Existed: 1934–1938

SR 354 was a state route through central Columbiana County. The route primarily provided access to Guilford Lake to nearby routes. In 1932, an unnumbered state route was created starting near the lake and traveling southeast on mostly dirt roads to US 30 west of Lisbon. The route received its number of SR 354 by 1934. Within one year, it was extended west to the community of New Garden at SR 9. The route existed in this form until 1939 when the entire route became an extension of SR 172, the number the road carries today.

Browse numbered routes
← SR 353	OH	→ SR 355

== SR 355 ==
State Route 355
- Location: Eaton
- Length: 1.37 mi (2.20 km)
- Existed: 1934–late 1990s

SR 355 was a short state route in Eaton, Preble County that served the Fort St. Clair State Memorial. The route was created in 1934 when a formerly unnumbered state route received its number. At a length of 1.37 miles (2.20 km), the route began at SR 122 west of downtown Eaton, traveled south to the memorial's entrance, went through the site, and ended at itself. The route was removed from the state highway system in the late 1990s after the memorial's jurisdiction was transferred to the city.

== SR 359 ==
State Route 359
- Location: Boston Township
- Length: 1.02 mi (1.64 km)
- Existed: 1934–late 1980s

SR 359 was a one-mile-long (1.6 km) state route connecting the entrance of Kendall State Park to SR 8, entirely in Boston Township, Summit County. The route was signed in 1934 replacing an unnumbered state-maintained dirt road. The route would not undergo any changes until the mid 1980s when SR 8 was moved off its surface road onto a nearby freeway. The route stopped appearing in the official state map beginning in 1987 but was included within the 1988 Summit County traffic survey report. The entire route is now a part of Summit County Road 187 Truxell Road

Browse numbered routes
← SR 358	OH	→ SR 360

== SR 367 ==
State Route 367
- Location: Russells Point
- Existed: 1934–1937

SR 367 was a short state route in Russells Point that existed from 1934 until 1937. The route started at the former SR 32 (later a part of US 33, now SR 366) and traveled north for a short distance. SR 367 served a small community on the shore of Indian Lake. After 1937, the entire route was replaced by SR 708.

== SR 375 ==
State Route 375
- Location: Marietta
- Existed: 1935–1969

SR 375 was a state route in and in the vicinity of Marietta that existed from 1935 until 1969. The route started at the intersection of Putnam and 3rd Streets; the latter street also carried US 21, US 50 Alternate, and SR 7. The route traveled north out of the city climbing to ridge lines along the hills here. Along its path, it intersected the former state highways SR 326 and SR 351. The route would remain near the tops of these hills except as it approached its northern terminus; the route made several sharp curves to quickly descend a hill to end at US 21. The route was deleted after 1969 which was also around the time I-77 was completed in the city. Today, the parts of the former SR 375 outside of the Marietta city limits are Washington County Road 375.

Browse numbered routes
← SR 374	OH	→ SR 376

== SR 381 ==
State Route 381
- Location: Greenville–Ansonia
- Existed: 1935–1936

SR 381 was a short-lived state highway connecting Greenville and Ansonia in western Darke County. The eight-mile-long (13 km) route was created in 1935 but was replaced after 1936 by SR 118 which was greatly expanded from its former terminus in Rockford.

Browse numbered routes
← SR 380	OH	→ SR 382

== SR 382 ==
State Route 382
- Location: Aurora–South Russell
- Existed: 1935–1936

SR 382 was a state highway in Portage and Geauga Counties that existed from 1935-1936. The route connected Aurora and US 422 south of the village of South Russell. The route was deleted in 1937 when SR 306 was extended south from its former end in Chesterland.

Browse numbered routes
← SR 381	OH	→ SR 383

== SR 384 ==
State Route 384
- Location: Williams Center–Ridgeville Corners
- Existed: 1935–1957

SR 384 was a state highway in the northwestern corner of Ohio. When the highway was first created in 1935, the route ran from US 6 east of Edgerton to SR 108 (which became SR 2 within one year) near Williams Center. By 1941, SR 384 was extended east through southern Williams County and northwestern Henry County to end at US 6 near Ridgeville Corners. The route was truncated at its western end to the SR 2 intersection in 1948 since US 6 was rerouted onto the now former section of SR 384. SR 384 would remain on this alignment for the remainder of its time as a state route. The route was deleted in 1957 when US 6 was rerouted out of Bryan and instead traveled on the entire length of the deleted route.

Browse numbered routes
← SR 383	OH	→ SR 385

== SR 386 ==
State Route 386
- Location: Violet Township–Liberty Township
- Existed: 1935–1936

SR 386 was a short spur route from SR 256 in northwestern Fairfield County. The route, which was six miles (9.7 km) long and located in parts of Violet and Liberty Townships, was created in 1935 along a dirt road. Within the next year, the route became a gravel road. The route was deleted in 1937 having been replaced by SR 204.

Browse numbered routes
← SR 385	OH	→ SR 387

== SR 387 ==
State Route 387
- Location: Sandusky
- Existed: 1935–1962

SR 387 was a state highway that served as a southern bypass of Sandusky. The route started at an intersection with US 6, State Routes 2, 12, and 101 southwest of the city. Though at first it traveled due south, the route curved to head due east, often forming the border between the city and Perkins Township. Along the way, SR 387 intersected SR 4 and US 250/SR 13. Near the route's end, it turned to the northeast and ended at US 6 east of the city. The route existed from 1935 until 1962 when the state relinquished control of the road. The parts of the former route that sit on the border of Sandusky and Perkins Township are now Erie County Road 5 (known locally as Perkins Avenue).

Browse numbered routes
← SR 386	OH	→ SR 412

== SR 424 ==
State Route 424
- Location: Defiance–Liberty Township
- Length: 25.77 mi (41.47 km)
- Existed: 1964–2012

SR 424 was the former routing of US 24 along the Maumee River between Defiance in Defiance County to Liberty Township, Henry County by way of Florida and Napoleon. The route was first designated in 1964 through Defiance when US 24 was moved to an expressway bypass north of the city. By 1969, as more of US 24 was moved onto the expressway through northwestern Ohio, SR 424 was extended to its full length of about 26 miles (42 km). The route would remain unchanged until 2008 when all of SR 424 in Defiance County was deleted from the state highway system. In 2012, the remaining portion of SR 424 in Henry County was deleted from the state system. All of the former state route outside of incorporated municipalities are signed as County Road 424.

== SR 440 ==
State Route 440
- Location: Englewood–St. Clairsville
- Existed: 1959–1967

SR 440 was the designation for former sections of US 40 which were moved onto nearby completed sections of Interstate 70 in the late 1950s and 1960s. In 1959, two sections of SR 440 existed: from Englewood to Springfield in the western part of the state, and from Kirkersville to Gratiot in the center part of Ohio. In 1962, another segment of the route was designated near St. Clairsville. A fourth separate segment of SR 440 was designated between Zanesville and Norwich by 1964. By 1969, as most of I-70 was completed across the state, all segments of SR 440 were reverted to US 40.

Browse numbered routes
← SR 435	OH	→ SR 444

== SR 504 ==
State Route 504
- Location: Staunton Township
- Length: 1.29 mi (2.08 km)
- Existed: 1937–1982

SR 504 was a short 1.29-mile-long (2.08 km) route east of Troy entirely in Staunton Township. It connected SR 70 (now a part of SR 41) and the northern terminus of SR 202 to SR 55. The route was assigned in 1937 and reassigned as the northernmost portion of SR 202 after 1982.

Browse numbered routes
← SR 503	OH	→ SR 505

== SR 509 ==
State Route 509
- Location: Carey–McCutchenville
- Existed: 1937–1964

SR 509 was a state route in northern Wyandot County. The route began in Carey at US 23 on Dow Street, traveled out of the village on North Patterson Street, and traveled along modern-day Wyandot County Roads 5 and 99. SR 509 ended southwest of McCutchenville at SR 53. The route was created in 1937 and was deleted in 1964.

Browse numbered routes
← SR 508	OH	→ SR 510

== SR 512 ==
State Route 512
- Location: Newark
- Existed: 1937–1961

SR 512 was a state route in Newark that existed from 1937 until 1959. Prior to 1937, SR 16 entered downtown Newark from the west on Granville Street staying to the north of the Raccoon Creek. In 1937, SR 512 was assigned on a straighter route into Newark via Church Street, crossing the creek twice. By 1941, the two routes switch places, SR 512 took the more northerly route into downtown Newark. SR 512 would remain in existence until 1961.

Browse numbered routes
← SR 511	OH	→ SR 513

== SR 522 (1937–1939) ==
State Route 522
- Location: Thompson Township–Trumbull Township
- Existed: 1937–1939

SR 522 was the designation for what is now the easternmost 4.8 miles (7.7 km) of SR 166 in Thompson Township, Geauga County and Trumbull Township, Ashtabula County. The route started in Thompson Township at the intersection of SR 166 (which traveled west and north of this point) and the northern terminus of SR 528 and traveled east to Trumbull Township at SR 534. The route only existed from 1937 until 1939 when it was wholly replaced by SR 166; SR 528 was then extended north along the former SR 166 to North Madison.

== SR 524 (1937–1941) ==
State Route 524
- Location: Simons–North Richmond
- Existed: 1937–1941

SR 524 was a north-south state route in the extreme eastern portion of Ashtabula County. The route started in the Williamsfield Township community of Simons at US 322. SR 524 traveled north along the western shore of the Pymatuning Reservoir, never straying more than one and a half miles (2.4 km) from the Pennsylvania state line. Along its way, it intersected SR 85 near Andover. The route ended at US 6 on the border of Richmond and Pierpont Townships. SR 524 was created in 1937 along a dirt road and by the time the route was removed from the state highway system in 1941, the route was gravel-paved.

== SR 526 ==
State Route 526
- Location: Akron–Mogadore
- Existed: 1937–1979

SR 526 was a state route in the vicinity of Akron and Mogadore. The route, first created in 1937, started in east of downtown Akron at East Market Street (SR 18) and traveled east along Mogadore Road. After passing through Mogadore and intersecting SR 532, the route ended in Suffield Township, Portage County at SR 43. By 1971, the route was truncated at its eastern end to SR 532 in Mogadore.

Browse numbered routes
← SR 524	OH	→ SR 527

== SR 527 (1937–1941) ==
State Route 527
- Location: Ghent–Kent
- Existed: 1937–1941

SR 527 was a state route through Summit and a part of Portage County that existed between 1937 and 1941. The route began near Ghent at US 21 and traveled east into the northern extents of Cuyahoga Falls. It also passed through Silver Lake before ending in the northern part of Kent at SR 43. Originally, the entire route was a gravel road but as time progressed, the part of SR 527 between Ghent and SR 8 became downgraded to a dirt road.

== SR 533 ==
State Route 533
- Location: Jefferson Township
- Length: 1.81 mi (2.91 km)
- Existed: 1937–2014

SR 533 was a 1.81-mile-long (2.91 km) state route entirely in Jefferson Township, Logan County. The route was a short north-south connector road between SR 540 and SR 47 northeast of Bellefontaine. The state-maintained route was in existence from 1937 until 2014 when the Ohio Department of Transportation and the Logan County Engineer's Office arranged a jurisdiction swap. SR 533 became Logan County Road 5 while portions of County Roads 144 and 144A became an extension of SR 347.

== SR 538 ==
State Route 538
- Location: Pierpont Township
- Existed: 1937–1938

SR 538 was a 2.7-mile-long (4.3 km) state highway entirely in Pierpont Township, Ashtabula County. The route, which existed in 1937 and 1938, connected SR 7 to the Pennsylvania state line where the road continued as PA 198. In 1939, the route became a part of the eastern extension of SR 167.

Browse numbered routes
← SR 537	OH	→ SR 539

== SR 539 (1937–1959) ==
State Route 539
- Location: Manchester Township
- Existed: 1937–1959

SR 539 was a state route entirely in Manchester Township, Morgan County. The route, also known as Wood Grove Road, connected SR 78 and SR 76 (modern-day SR 83) in the northeast corner of the county. SR 539 was in existence from 1937 until 1959 when the route was replaced by Morgan County Road 27.

== SR 541 (1937–1942) ==
State Route 541
- Location: Mentor
- Existed: 1937–1942

SR 541 was a state route in the now-defunct Mentor Township, located between Mentor and Painesville. The route, also called Heisley Road, started at US 20 and traveled north to SR 283. SR 541 was a part of the state highway system from 1937 until 1942. In 1963, some of the right-of-way of the old SR 541 became a part of a state highway again as SR 44 was routed along Heisley Road from the newly constructed SR 2 freeway past a new interchange with SR 283 to Headlands Beach State Park.

== SR 543 ==
State Route 543
- Location: Springcreek Township–Orange Township
- Existed: 1937–1959

SR 543 was a state route in northern Miami and the extreme southern portion of Shelby County. SR 543 served as a shortcut from US 36 between Piqua and Fletcher and US 25 south of Sidney. The route was created in 1937 and was removed by 1961 when US 25 was moved onto a new freeway (I-75) west of its original route.

Browse numbered routes
← SR 542	OH	→ SR 544

== SR 544 ==
State Route 544
- Location: Sharon Township
- Existed: 1937–1959

SR 544 was a state route in western Sharon Township, Richland County. The short route connected SR 61 and SR 96, though for the first two years of its existence (1937 through 1938), there was no connecting state route at SR 544's northern end; it was a spur to the community of Hines. The route was deleted after 1959.

Browse numbered routes
← SR 543	OH	→ SR 545

== SR 548 ==
State Route 548
- Location: Mount Eaton–Wadsworth
- Existed: 1937–1967

SR 548 was a state route Wayne and Medina Counties. Existing from 1937 until 1967, the route started in Mount Eaton at US 250 and SR 241 and traveled through Dalton, Marshallville, and Easton before ending in Wadsworth at SR 94. The route would follow this routing throughout its entire history. Around 1969, numerous state highways were rerouted in Wayne County; as a result of this, SR 94 was routed along the entire length of SR 548 therefore the SR 548 designation was deleted.

Browse numbered routes
← SR 547	OH	→ SR 549

== SR 549 ==
State Route 549
- Location: Mohicanville–Wooster
- Existed: 1937–1938

SR 549 was the designation for what is now SR 95 between Mohicanville at SR 89 and SR 3 southwest of Wooster. The route was short-lived, it only existed in 1937 and 1938. By 1939, the entire route became a part of SR 95, the number the road carries today.

Browse numbered routes
← SR 548	OH	→ SR 550

== SR 550 (1937–1946) ==
State Route 550
- Location: Pebble Township–Waverly
- Existed: 1937–1946

SR 550 was a state route in Pike County that connected Pebble Township and Waverly. The route existed from 1937 until 1946 and also provided access to the western shore of Lake White and its two associated state routes (Routes 551 and 552). In 1947, SR 220 was extended from its end in Waverly along all of SR 550 to SR 772. The SR 550 designation was therefore deleted.

== SR 563 ==
State Route 563
- Location: Dexter City–Middleburg
- Existed: 1937–1964

SR 563 was a rural state highway in Noble County. The five-mile-long (8.0 km) route started near Dexter City at US 21 and traveled west and northwest to its eastern terminus at SR 564 in Enoch Township near Middleburg. The route was in existence from 1937 until 1964 when the entire road's jurisdiction was transferred to Noble County forming Noble County Road 2 (also known as Low Gap Road).

Browse numbered routes
← SR 562	OH	→ SR 564

== SR 567 ==
State Route 567
- Location: Northwest Township–Pioneer
- Existed: 1938–1955

SR 567 was a state highway that ran near Ohio's northern border with Michigan from 1938 until 1955. The route started at SR 49 in Northwest Township (about three miles (4.8 km) from the Ohio-Michigan-Indiana tripoint) and traveled east, first past the northern shoreline of Nettle Lake, then a short jog to the south before heading east again past SR 571 and ending in the village of Pioneer at SR 15. This alignment would be maintained throughout its history. After being deleted from the state highway system, the route became a part of Williams County Road 14.

Browse numbered routes
← SR 566	OH	→ SR 568

== SR 568 ==
State Route 568
- Location: Sylvania–Washington Township
- Existed: 1939–1951

SR 568 was a state highway in northern Lucas County that ran near the Michigan state line. The route it utilized for most of its history from 1939 until 1951 started in Sylvania at US 223 and ran east along Alexis Road to US 25 (Detroit Avenue) in Washington Township. For its first year in existence, however, SR 568 was signed west of Sylvania along what became SR 120 by 1940. Beginning in 1947, the route east of SR 183 was co-signed with Bypass US 23-24-25. After 1951, the part of Alexis Road co-signed with the Bypass US Routes became solely designated as that route while the remainder of Alexis Road was removed from the state highway system though by 1964, all of Alexis Road was signed as Bypass US 24–25. Today, all of Alexis Road from its western terminus in Sylvania to I-75 (east of the original eastern terminus at Detroit Avenue) is known as SR 184.
