= Ohio State Route 220 =

State highway in Pike County, Ohio, US

State Route 220

Route information
- Maintained by ODOT
- Length: 14.00 mi (22.53 km)
- Existed: 1923–present

Major junctions
- West end: SR 772 near Waverly
- US 23 in Waverly
- East end: SR 32 / SR 124 / CR 18 near Piketon

Location
- Country: United States
- State: Ohio
- Counties: Pike

Highway system
- Ohio State Highway System; Interstate; US; State; Scenic
← SR 219	→ SR 221

State Route 220 (SR 220) is an east–west state highway in the south central portion of the U.S. state of Ohio. Its western terminus is at SR 772 about 8.25 miles (13.28 km) west of Waverly, and its eastern terminus is at the SR 32/SR 124 concurrency 3 miles (4.8 km) east of Piketon. The entire route is in Pike County.

== Route description ==
SR 220 begins at a T-intersection with SR 772 in Pebble Township. The route heads east through a rural, hilly area passing near the 1,200-foot-high (370 m) Combs Knob and Sponyers Knob. SR 220 enters Pee Pee Township and descends 300 feet (91 m) into the valley formed by the Pee Pee Creek at the community of Daleyville. The route intersects the western terminus of SR 551 next to Lake White. SR 220 runs along the northwestern edge of the lake and along the base of a 300-foot-high (91 m) hill before reaching SR 552 at the northernmost point of the lake. Now no longer bounded by the lake, SR 220 begins to climb in elevation again before turning to the east towards Waverly. After entering the Waverly passing the Waverly High School campus, the road descends again, crosses the Crooked Creek, and enters downtown Waverly. Prior to this point, SR 220 was routed along North Street in Waverly. At the intersection with Market Street, SR 220 turns right onto it. At Emmitt Avenue, SR 220 intersects US 23, SR 104 and the northern terminus of SR 335 (though SR 335 heads north from this point). SR 220 continues southeast on Market Street for two more blocks before turning left onto West 3rd Street for two blocks, and heading south on Bridge Street out of Waverly. After exiting Waverly, it briefly reenters Pee Pee Township before crossing the Scioto River and entering Seal Township. In the community of Greggs Hill, SR 220 passes under two railroad overpasses and makes an S-curve before continuing south. For the remainder of the route, the route heads nearly due south east of Piketon and through Zahns Corner before ending at an intersection with the four-lane divided SR 32 and SR 124 (also called the James A. Rhodes Appalachian Highway). The road continues south as Pike County Route 81, Schuster Road.

== History ==
In 1923, the route south of Waverly that had been a part of the state highway system since 1912 (as SR 367) was renumbered to SR 220. SR 220 was extended to its current western terminus at SR 772 in 1947 when it replaced all of SR 550, a road designated in 1937. When SR 124 was moved on a new alignment south of Piketon between 1953 and 1955, SR 220 was routed along a one-half-mile-long (0.80 km) former portion of SR 124 called Zahns Corner Road. In the mid 1990s when the Appalachian Highway was dualized across the state, SR 220's eastern terminus was moved further east along another old segment of SR 124 bringing the total mileage to over 15 miles (24 km). By 2013, SR 220's eastern terminus was moved to a location near its original southern terminus from 1923 when a portion of Schuster Road (CR 81) was taken over by the state between the Appalachian Highway and the intersection of SR 220 and Zahns Corner Road.

== Major intersections ==
The entire route is in Pike County.

Location	mi	km	Destinations	Notes
Pebble Township	0.00	0.00	SR 772	
Pee Pee Township	4.07	6.55	SR 551 east (County Road)	Western terminus of SR 551
Pee Pee Township	5.37	8.64	SR 552 east	Western terminus of SR 552
Waverly	8.28	13.33	US 23 / SR 104 / SR 335 south (Emmitt Avenue)	Northern terminus of SR 335
Seal Township	14.00	22.53	SR 32 / SR 124 (James A. Rhodes Appalachian Highway) / CR 18 (Schuster Road)	
1.000 mi = 1.609 km; 1.000 km = 0.621 mi

== SR 220 Truck ==
State Route 220 Truck
- Location: Waverly, Ohio

SR 220 Truck is a truck route in and around Waverly so that trucks can bypass several turns in the downtown area while heading to and from US 23. The 2.1-mile-long (3.4 km) truck route begins at the intersection of SR 220, US 23, SR 104, SR 335 in the center of Waverly. The route heads south along US 23 (Emmitt Avenue) before turning southeast onto Pride Drive, northeast onto West 2nd Street, and southeast onto Depot Street before ending at SR 220 south of downtown Waverly. Another branch of the truck route extends southwest along West 2nd Street to end at US 23 further south of the Pride Street intersection where the main truck route runs.
