= Ohio State Route 552 =

State highway in Pike County, Ohio, US

State Route 552

Route information
- Maintained by ODOT
- Length: 1.75 mi (2.82 km)
- Existed: 1937–present

Major junctions
- West end: SR 220 near Waverly
- East end: SR 104 near Waverly

Location
- Country: United States
- State: Ohio
- Counties: Pike

Highway system
- Ohio State Highway System; Interstate; US; State; Scenic
← SR 551	→ SR 553

State Route 552 (SR 552) is an east-west state highway in southern Ohio. The western terminus of the route is at SR 220 about two and a half miles (4.0 km) west of Waverly. Its eastern terminus is at SR 104 nearly two miles (3.2 km) southwest of Waverly.

SR 552 is located entirely within Pee Pee Township in northern Pike County. The highway follows the north shore of Lake White (part of Lake White State Park), while the corresponding state route following the south shore of the lake is SR 551.

== Route description ==
Starting from a T-intersection with SR 220 southwest of Waverly, SR 552 travels in an east-southeasterly direction, before turning more to the south-southeast, bounded by woods on the north side and the north shore of Lake White on the south side. Cottages line both sides of the state highway for most of its length. and side streets on both the north and south sides link SR 552 with addition lakeside or woods-bounded dwellings. The route trends more to the southeast, then curves to the east-southeast, finally bending to the northeast as it enters into its terminal intersection at SR 104 at a sharp angle. Because of this, a short connector road is provided to facilitate movements between eastbound SR 552 and southbound SR 104, as well as between northbound SR 104 and westbound SR 552.

SR 552 is not included as a part of the National Highway System.

== History ==
SR 552 was designated in 1937, along the route that it occupies today along the northern edge of Lake White. No significant changes have taken place to the routing of this state highway since its certification.

== Major intersections ==
The entire route is in Pee Pee Township, Pike County.

mi	km	Destinations	Notes
0.00	0.00	SR 220	
1.75	2.82	SR 104	
1.000 mi = 1.609 km; 1.000 km = 0.621 mi
