= Ohio State Route 551 =

State highway in Pike County, Ohio, US

State Route 551

Route information
- Maintained by ODOT
- Length: 2.87 mi (4.62 km)
- Existed: 1937–present

Major junctions
- West end: SR 220 near Waverly
- East end: SR 104 near Waverly

Location
- Country: United States
- State: Ohio
- Counties: Pike

Highway system
- Ohio State Highway System; Interstate; US; State; Scenic
← SR 550	→ SR 552

State Route 551 (SR 551) is an east-west state highway in southern Ohio. Its western terminus is at a T-intersection with SR 220 about four miles (6.4 km) southwest of Waverly, and its eastern terminus is at a T-intersection with SR 104 approximately two and a half miles (4.0 km) southwest of Waverly. Existing entirely within Pike County's Pee Pee Township, SR 551 follows the south shore of Lake White, while SR 552 follows the north shore. Lake White State Park is located near SR 551's western terminus.

== Route description ==
SR 551 commences at a T-intersection with SR 220 near the west shore of Lake White southwest of the village of Waverly. Abutted by forest on the south side for most of its length, SR 551 starts out in a southerly direction, then hooks around the west end of Lake White, bending to the northeast. Generally following in parallel with the south shore of Lake White, the state highway passes a number of cottages and side streets that connect to additional cottages. The highway then travels in an inverted "U", curving east and then to the south and southeast. SR 551 turns east just prior to the park lands of Lake White State Park and its endpoint at a T-intersection with SR 104.

No part of SR 551 is included within the National Highway System.

== History ==
Originally designated in 1937 along the route that it currently occupies along the south shore of Lake White, SR 551 has not seen any significant changes to its routing since its creation.

== Major intersections ==
The entire route is in Pee Pee Township, Pike County.

mi	km	Destinations	Notes
0.00	0.00	SR 220	
2.87	4.62	SR 104	
1.000 mi = 1.609 km; 1.000 km = 0.621 mi
