= Ohio State Route 104 =

State highway in southern Ohio, US

State Route 104

- Route of SR 104 highlighted in red

Route information
- Maintained by ODOT
- Length: 95.17 mi (153.16 km)
- Existed: 1924–present

Major junctions
- South end: US 23 / SR 73 in Portsmouth
- US 23 in Waverly; US 50 / SR 159 in Chillicothe; US 35 in Chillicothe; SR 207 near Chillicothe; US 22 near Circleville; I-71 in Columbus
- North end: US 33 in Columbus

Location
- Country: United States
- State: Ohio
- Counties: Scioto, Pike, Ross, Pickaway, Franklin

Highway system
- Ohio State Highway System; Interstate; US; State; Scenic
← SR 103	→ SR 105
← SR 111	SR 112	→ SR 113

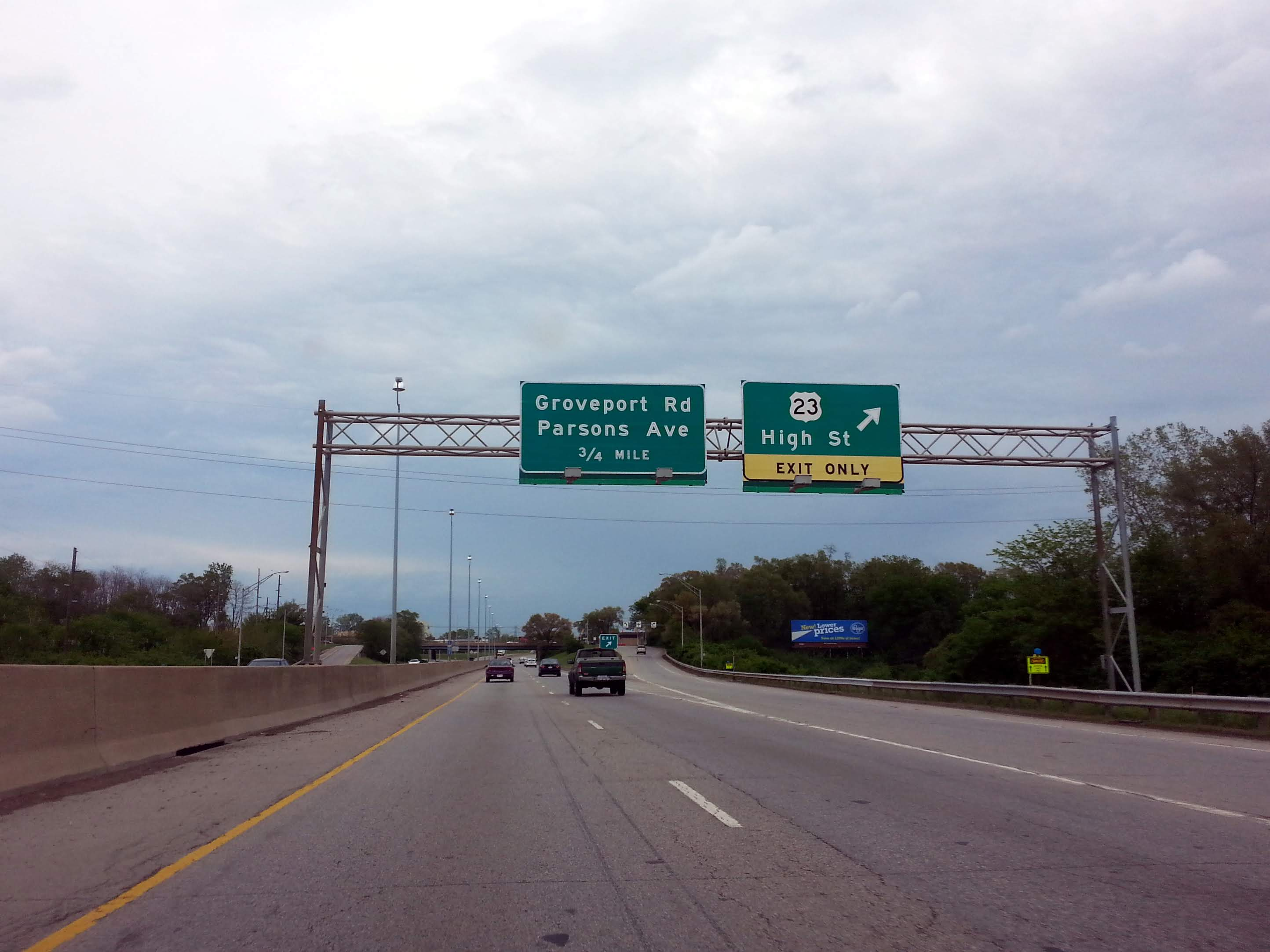
At U.S. Route 23 in Columbus

State Route 104 (SR 104) is a north–south highway in Southern Ohio. Its southern terminus is at U.S. Route 23 (US 23) in Portsmouth, Ohio and its northern terminus is at US 33 in Columbus. The route passes through or close to the towns of Portsmouth, Waverly, Chillicothe, Grove City, and Columbus. From Waverly to Chillicothe, it overlaps US 23.

Though officially a north-south highway for its entire length, SR 104 formerly was signed east-west through Columbus (and is signed east-west on ramps coming from US 33).

== History ==
SR 104 is an original state highway with two parts: One from Portsmouth to Waverly, and one from Chillicothe to Columbus. The southern part of the route was decertified when U.S. Route 23 was certified in 1926. This southern route was replaced with the now defunct route number State Route 112. In 1951, the southern part of the route was recertified as State Route 104, connecting to the northern part of the route by overlapping U.S. Route 23. The route close to Portsmouth was concurrent with State Route 73.

In March 1951, the Ohio Department of Highways converted an 8 1/2-mile-long (13.7 km) section of SR 104 south of Columbus into a test strip for traffic signs. It was the first in a series of experiments sponsored by the United Nations in four states and five other countries to compare the effectiveness of national traffic sign standards from around the world. A series of 24 signs from six countries were placed along the road along with distance gauges for 30 test subjects. The department abandoned the experiment four days after it started, after the signs attracted unexpected controversy and curious onlookers who posed a hazard. The experiments eventually led to the Vienna Convention on Road Signs and Signals, which was adopted in many countries but not the United States.

Since 1968, SR 104's northern terminus has been extended twice – to U.S. Route 23 in 1968 and to U.S. Route 33 via freeway in 1989 – and its southern terminus has been extended twice into Portsmouth in 1972 and to U.S. Route 23 in 1974.

In 1998, a section of SR 104, concurrent with SR 73, in Scioto County had its grade raised out of the flood plain to prevent recurring flooding on the roadway in a $3.8 million project.

In 2010, a section of SR 104 north of Chillicothe to SR 207 in Ross County was widened into a four-lane highway. $6.5 million out of the $10.6 million cost to widen were from funds from the American Recovery and Reinvestment Act.

== Major junctions ==
County	Location	mi	km	Exit	Destinations	Notes
Scioto	Portsmouth	0.00	0.00		US 23 (Chillicothe Street / U.S. Grant Bridge) / SR 73 begins / 2nd Street	Southern end of US 23 southbound / SR 73 concurrencies / Southern end of SR 104 / Eastern end of SR 73
Scioto	Portsmouth	0.11	0.18		US 23 / Washington Street	Northern end of US 23 southbound concurrency
Scioto	Washington Township	1.09– 1.82	1.75– 2.93		US 52 / US 23 Truck south / SR 852 – Cincinnati, Kentucky, Ironton	Interchange; northern terminus of SR 852; no access from SR 104 northbound to US 52 eastbound
Scioto	Washington Township	2.35	3.78		SR 239 south to US 52	Northern terminus of SR 239
Scioto	Rush Township	6.37	10.25		SR 73 west – Hillsboro	Northern end of SR 73 concurrency
Scioto	Morgan Township	12.13	19.52		SR 348	
Pike	Newton Township	24.27	39.06		SR 32 / SR 124 (James A. Rhodes Appalachian Highway)	
Pike	Pee Pee Township	28.34	45.61		SR 551 west	Eastern terminus of SR 551
Pike	Pee Pee Township	29.10	46.83		SR 552 west	Eastern terminus of SR 552
Pike	Waverly	30.36	48.86		US 23 south / SR 220 Truck south (Emmitt Avenue) – Portsmouth	Southern end of US 23 / SR 220 Truck concurrency
Pike	Waverly	31.00	49.89		SR 220 (Market Street) / SR 335 begins / SR 220 Truck ends	Northern end of SR 220 Truck concurrency; southern end of SR 335 concurrency
Pike	Waverly	31.35	50.45		SR 335 south (Clough Street)	Northern end of SR 335 concurrency
Ross	Franklin Township	37.46	60.29		SR 372 east – Scioto Trail State Forest	Western terminus of SR 372
Ross	Scioto Township	43.23– 43.70	69.57– 70.33		US 23 north / US 23 Bus. begins / CR 205 (Three Locks Road) – Columbus	Interchange; northern end of US 23 concurrency; southern end of US 23 Bus. Concurrency; US 23 exit 41
Ross	Chillicothe	46.62	75.03		US 50 east (Eastern Avenue) / Eighth Street	Southern end of US 50 concurrency
Ross	Chillicothe	47.14	75.86		US 23 Bus. north / SR 159 north (Bridge Street) / Main Street	Northern end of US 23 Bus. concurrency; southern terminus of SR 159
Ross	Chillicothe	47.56	76.54		SR 772 south (Paint Street)	Northern terminus of SR 772
Ross	Chillicothe	47.90	77.09		US 50 west (Western Avenue) / High Street / Carlisle Place – Hillsboro, Cincinnati	Northern end of US 50 concurrency
Ross	Scioto Township	49.26– 49.43	79.28– 79.55		US 35	Interchange, US 35 exit 110
Ross	Union Township	52.77	84.93		SR 207 south to US 23	Southern end of SR 207 concurrency
Ross	Union Township	53.29	85.76		SR 207 north	Northern end of SR 207 concurrency
Pickaway	Wayne Township	66.85	107.58		US 22 – Circleville, Washington Court House	
Pickaway	Jackson Township	68.23	109.81		SR 56 – Circleville, London	
Pickaway	Scioto Township	76.20	122.63		SR 316 – Darbyville, South Bloomfield	
Pickaway	Scioto Township	79.58	128.07		SR 762 – Commercial Point	
Franklin	Grove City–Jackson Township municipal line	83.43	134.27		SR 665 – London, Groveport	
Franklin	Columbus	89.93– 90.06	144.73– 144.94	89	I-71 / Frank Road – Columbus, Cincinnati	Exit 104 (I-71)
Franklin	Columbus	Southern end of freeway				
Franklin	Columbus	90.44– 90.65	145.55– 145.89	90	Haul Road / Impound Lot Road	
Franklin	Columbus	90.80– 91.14	146.13– 146.68	91	US 23 (High Street)	
Franklin	Columbus	91.57– 91.90	147.37– 147.90	92	Groveport Road / Parsons Road	
Franklin	Columbus	92.38– 92.79	148.67– 149.33	93	Lockbourne Road	
Franklin	Columbus	94.19– 94.43	151.58– 151.97	94	Alum Creek Road / Performance Parkway / Refugee Road	
Franklin	Columbus	Northern end of freeway				
Franklin	Columbus	94.98– 95.17	152.86– 153.16	95 A-B	US 33 to I-70 / Refugee Road – Lancaster	Northern end of SR 104
1.000 mi = 1.609 km; 1.000 km = 0.621 mi: Concurrency terminus; Incomplete access
