= List of highways numbered 527 =

The following highways are numbered 527:

== Canada ==
- Alberta Highway 527
- Ontario Highway 527

== India ==
- National Highway 527 (India)

== Ireland ==
- R527 road (Ireland)

== United Kingdom ==
- A527 road

== United States ==
- SR 527
  - County Road 527A (Orange County, Florida)
- MD 527
- CR 527
- SR 527
- PR-527
- SC 527
- SR 527
- WV 527

| Preceded by 526 | Lists of highways 527 | Succeeded by 528 |
