= List of highways numbered 526 =

The following highways are numbered 526:

== Canada ==
- Alberta Highway 526
- Ontario Highway 526

== Ireland ==
- R526 road (Ireland)

== South Africa ==
- R526 (South Africa)

== United Kingdom ==
- A526 road

== United States ==
- I-526
- CR 526
- SR 526 (former)
- PR-526
- SR 526

Preceded by 525	Lists of highways 526	Succeeded by 527
