= Lawrence County Airpark =

- IATA: HTW; ICAO: KHTW; FAA LID: HTW

Summary
- Airport type: Public
- Owner: Lawrence County Board of Commissioners
- Serves: Chesapeake, Ohio / Huntington, West Virginia
- Opened: 1929
- Time zone: UTC−05:00 (-5)
  - Summer (DST): UTC−04:00 (-4)
- Elevation AMSL: 568 ft (173 m)
- Coordinates: 38°25′09″N 082°29′40″W

Map
- Location of airport in Ohio HTW (the United States)

Runways
Direction	Length		Surface
Direction	ft	m	Surface
8/26	3,001	915	Asphalt

Statistics (2020)
- Aircraft operations: 41,975
- Based aircraft: 28
- Source: Federal Aviation Administration

Lawrence County Airpark (IATA: HTW, ICAO: KHTW, FAA LID: HTW) is a public use airport located two nautical miles (3.7 km) west of the central business district of Chesapeake, a village in Lawrence County, Ohio, United States. It is publicly owned by Lawrence County Board of Commissioners. The airport lies across the Ohio River from Huntington, West Virginia.

== History ==
Lawrence County Airpark, originally known as Huntington Airport, was established in 1929. In June of that year, John Paul Riddle of the Cincinnati-based Embry-Riddle Company completed negotiations for the establishment of an airport for the cities of the Kentucky, Ohio, West Virginia tri-state area. The company sought to expand their growing air mail and passenger routes east, via the Ohio River valley. The Embry-Riddle Company put up $100,000, with another $25,000 contributed by the Huntington Chamber of Commerce, $25,000 from the Huntington Bridge Company, and $25,000 from a local aviation booster club. The club enrolled 250 members, charging a membership fee of $100. This money was used to fund the airport project. The land was purchased primarily from a Mr. Joe L. Wilson, partner in the Huntington Bridge Company, who had used the land for farmland.

Development of the land began in June but was slowed due to high levels of rain. Eventually several houses and a barn were removed, though two structures were initially left intact on the north side of the field for use as office and flight crew facilities.

The new Huntington-Ironton-Chesapeake Airport opened on August 31, 1929, with a 3,600 feet (1,097 m) east-west sod landing strip (current site of runway 8/26) and a north-south strip 2,500 feet (762 m) in length (partially still in use as the airfield's only taxiway). The opening fell on Labor Day weekend, and massive celebrations were planned. Approximately 45,000 people attended the opening events throughout the weekend, which included aerial stunts and rides ($10 each).

Ten planes, owned by the Embry-Riddle Company were stationed at the field. These included several Wacos. A Ford Tri-Motor was on display for opening day. There was a raffle for a free flight to Cincinnati's Lunken Field, and a folded-wing aircraft carrying local government and civic leaders Taxied across the bridge, led a parade around Huntington, West Virginia, then returned to the airport, extended its wings, and took them on an aerial tour.

At the time of opening, the Embry-Riddle Company was to run the field and FBO. The company also opened a flight school. Embry-Riddle closed its flight school and withdrew service the next year, the result of disputes with the Huntington Chamber of Commerce over the building of a hangar facility.

The 1930s were marked by repeated attempts to establish passenger and mail service to the H-I-C Airport. 1932 and 1936 saw relatively short attempts by American Airlines to set up service. In 1938, a permanent, regular service was begun. This was in part due to an agreement to lengthen and pave the main runway. As part of this deal, land was purchased for a 1,000-foot runway extension to the west in 1937. Air service lasted until April, 1945, when American closed their weather office and stopped mail and passenger services. The airline had been stopping an H-I-C when weight conditions allowed – by 1945 the runway was too short for AA's DC-3s to take off fully loaded. The runway had deteriorated markedly by 1945, and the main runway still had not been extended. This ultimately resulted in the 1947 creation of a Huntington Airport Authority to establish the current Tri-State Airport (HTS) in Wayne County, West Virginia.

Mayes Field was renamed Huntington Airport after it was purchased in August 1946.

In February 1968, a group of county residents began a petition to have the airport closed. In early May 1968, the airport was tentatively selected by the county to receive a $100,000 state grant to extend the runway to 3,870 feet (1,180 m). The plan required the county to acquire approximately 3 acres (1.2 ha) of land to the west of the airport and possibly building an underpass to accommodate a road. However, the owner, George Wilson, refused to sell. Furthermore, a number of other factors, such as the proximity of the approach to the West Huntington Bridge militated against the airport. An injunction filed by the county to prevent Wilson from further excavation at the airport was served in mid October 1968. The combination of these issues resulted in focus shifting to a site near Hanging Rock two days later. (Note: Efforts were again refocused on another site near Pine Grove in late November, but by early March 1969 the available state funds were nearly depleted.)

Meanwhile, in mid September 1968, the North Kenova Development Company run by George Wilson, sued the fixed-base operator for lack of payment of rent. The case was decided in favor of the company the following February. The ruling was appealed a week later, but it was dismissed by late January 1970. The FBO, however, planned to move to a former restaurant on the other side of road from the airport and continue operating. By late April, Wilson had sought to have a portion of the airport property returned to him so that his sand and gravel company could use it for excavation. The situation became so heated that the county commissioners began receiving mail with personal attacks. The North Kenova Development Company announced in late October 1970 that the airport would be temporarily closed. At the same time, the FBO was finally evicted. Amid concerns from pilots that the company was planning to close the airport permanently, the county began considering the possibility of an injunction to keep it open. During the closure, Wilson argued that the infrastructure at the airport was in a state of disrepair and would require significant repairs before it could be reopened. A few days later, the Chesapeake village council passed a resolution endorsing the idea that the airport be closed and redeveloped. The airport did indeed reopen on December 1st, but disputes between the lessor and the former FBO over the ownership of two hangars remained. A level of confusion also existed over whether the official status of the airport until mid January 1971. The FBO finally moved to the Tri-State Airport in West Virginia in March.

However, a ruling in a three-year long lawsuit in late August 1971 reaffirmed that the county, and not the North Kenova Development Company, owned the airport. The county subsequently approved a lease to Lawrence County Airpark, Inc. in late January 1972 – which was immediately contested by five local residents. A 12-unit, 8,400-square-foot (780 m^{2}) hangar was under construction at the airport in mid November 1972. The ruling invalidating the lease was overturned by an appeals court later that month and the company subsequently ordered the airport operator to leave the property by late January. The day after the deadline, the county commissioners and the president of the North Kenova Development Company reached an agreement that the latter had one year to demonstrate that the airport was being used as such. If not, the former could take possession of the property. A proposal to build a 750,000-square-foot (70,000 m^{2}) shopping mall on the site was made in mid May 1973. Five individuals, including the wife of a couple that previously owned the airport, joined the court case in early 1974, arguing that the county had not kept up its duty to ensure that an airport operated on the site. In early April 1975, a judge ruled the county commissioners were recognized as owners of the airpark. It was then leased to Lawrence County Aviation, Inc. in early December 1979. The corporation announced plans to build a 12-unit, 12,000-square-foot (1,100 m^{2}) t-hangar and lengthen the runway to 4,000 feet (1,200 m) a few months later.

By late February 1990, it had received a state grant to widen the runway and been leased to a private individual. One year later, the airport manager was attempting to have more hangars built and the widening of the runway to 70 feet (21 m) was almost ready to begin. A squadron of the Ohio Wing Civil Air Patrol was established at the airport by late May 1993. A husband and wife team took over as operator in November 1995. By early November 1997, nearby trees had grown tall enough to become obstructions for aircraft. A lack of liability insurance resulted in the lease of the airport operator, Southern Ohio Aviation, being cancelled in mid October 1998. The Lawrence County Educational Service Center took over operation of the airport at the start of 1999 and announced plans to start a vocational training center. However, legal issues resulted in the center terminating its lease less than eight months later. A five year lease was granted to a non-profit corporation that October. By mid March 2000, additional hangars were under construction and the administration building was being renovated. Construction of a hangar for flight training began in May 2002. State grants were approved in 2003 and 2004 to repave the runway and apron and improve drainage, respectively.

In 2022, the airport received $82,770 to cover repairs and infrastructure upgrades. The airport used the money to rehabilitate the existing general aviation ramp as well as an existing taxiway to maintain structural integrity. In 2023, the airport received $100,000 to continue these upgrades.

== Facilities and aircraft ==
Lawrence County Airpark covers an area of 86 acres (35 ha) at an elevation of 568 feet (173 m) above mean sea level. It has one runway designated 8/26 with an asphalt surface measuring 2,998 by 70 feet (914 x 21 m).

For the 12-month period ending October 2, 2020, the airport had 41,975 aircraft operations, an average of 115 per day. It was 99% general aviation, 1% air taxi, and <1% military. For the same time period, 28 aircraft were based at the airport: 26 single-engine and 2 multi-engine airplanes.

There is one fixed-base operator on-field, Attitude Aviation. They currently have three Cessna 172 Skyhawks and one Beechcraft Bonanza available for rent, as well as maintenance and repair facilities. They also offer 100LL fuel, oil, and assorted charts and supplies for sale in addition to flight instruction.

There is also a jump zone, Tri-State Skydivers, at the airport. They operate a modified Cessna 182, have skydiving instructors and parachutes available for rent, and operate most weekends throughout the year.

== Accidents and incidents ==
- On August 9, 1942, an aircraft operated by the Civil Air Patrol crashed near the airport shortly after taking off, killing two of the four occupants.
- On August 11, 1946, a twin-engine Beechcraft and a single-engine Aeronca collided above the airport, killing all four occupants of both airplanes, including two Navy officers.
- On March 13, 2005, a Grumman American AA-5 was destroyed when it impacted terrain, shortly after takeoff from the Lawrence County Airpark. Witnesses report that the aircraft appeared to be high on its first approach, so it executed a go-around. The airplane continued around the traffic pattern and returned to land a second time. The second landing attempt appeared fast, and the intended touchdown point was "far down the runway." The pilot applied power again, and the airplane became airborne with a nose high attitude. The airplane cleared the 30-foot high trees located at the end of the runway and began to wobble; the right wing dropped, and the airplane descended to the ground about 1/4 mile from the airport. The probable cause of the accident was found to be the pilot's failure to maintain airspeed during the aborted landing, which resulted in an inadvertent stall.
- On January 30, 2011, a Cessna 172P Skyhawk sustained substantial damage when it impacted the terrain after it hit trees during an aborted landing at the Lawrence County Airpark. The pilot reported a normal preflight, engine runup, and takeoff. On climbout, the pilot reported that the engine suddenly and continuously started to sound as if it was running “rough” and “missing." Without checking engine instruments, he immediately executed a steep left turn to return and land. Upon completing the turn, he realized he was too high to land on runway 26, so he retarded the throttle to idle, extended full flaps, executed a forward slip, and began a series of shallow S-turns to lose altitude. As it was 5-10 knots high and slightly fast crossing the runway's threshold, the aircraft floated 2,000 feet down the runway. After touchdown, the pilot used toe brakes to no effect and realized he would hit trees at the end of the runway, so he applied full power to go around and, though only trying to retract one notch, inadvertently retracted all of the wing flaps. The aircraft stalled as it brushed the tree tops, the left wing dropped, and the airplane impacted terrain. The probable cause of the accident was found to be the partial loss of engine power due to carburetor icing and the pilot’s delayed use of carburetor heat and failure to attain the proper touchdown point on the runway during the precautionary landing.
- On March 9. 2016, a Remos GX was substantially damaged while landing at the Lawrence County Airpark. According to the pilot, during final approach, his airspeed was too fast. He decided to extend the landing flare in ground effect to bleed off the excess airspeed. As the airplane's main landing gear touched down on the runway, the airplane bounced. When the airplane settled back on the runway, the nose gear collapsed and the airplane exited the runway. The probable cause of the accident was found to be the pilot's unstable approach, which resulted in excessive airspeed during the touchdown, subsequent bounced landing, collapsed nose landing gear, and a runway excursion.

== See also ==
- List of airports in Ohio
- Transportation in Huntington, West Virginia
