= West Virginia Route 527 =

State highway in West Virginia, United States

West Virginia Route 527

Route information
- Maintained by WVDOH
- Length: 2.25 mi (3.62 km)

Major junctions
- South end: I-64 / WV 152 in Huntington
- US 60 in Huntington
- North end: SR 527 in Huntington

Location
- Country: United States
- State: West Virginia
- Counties: Cabell

Highway system
- West Virginia State Highway System; Interstate; US; State
← US 522	→ WV 598

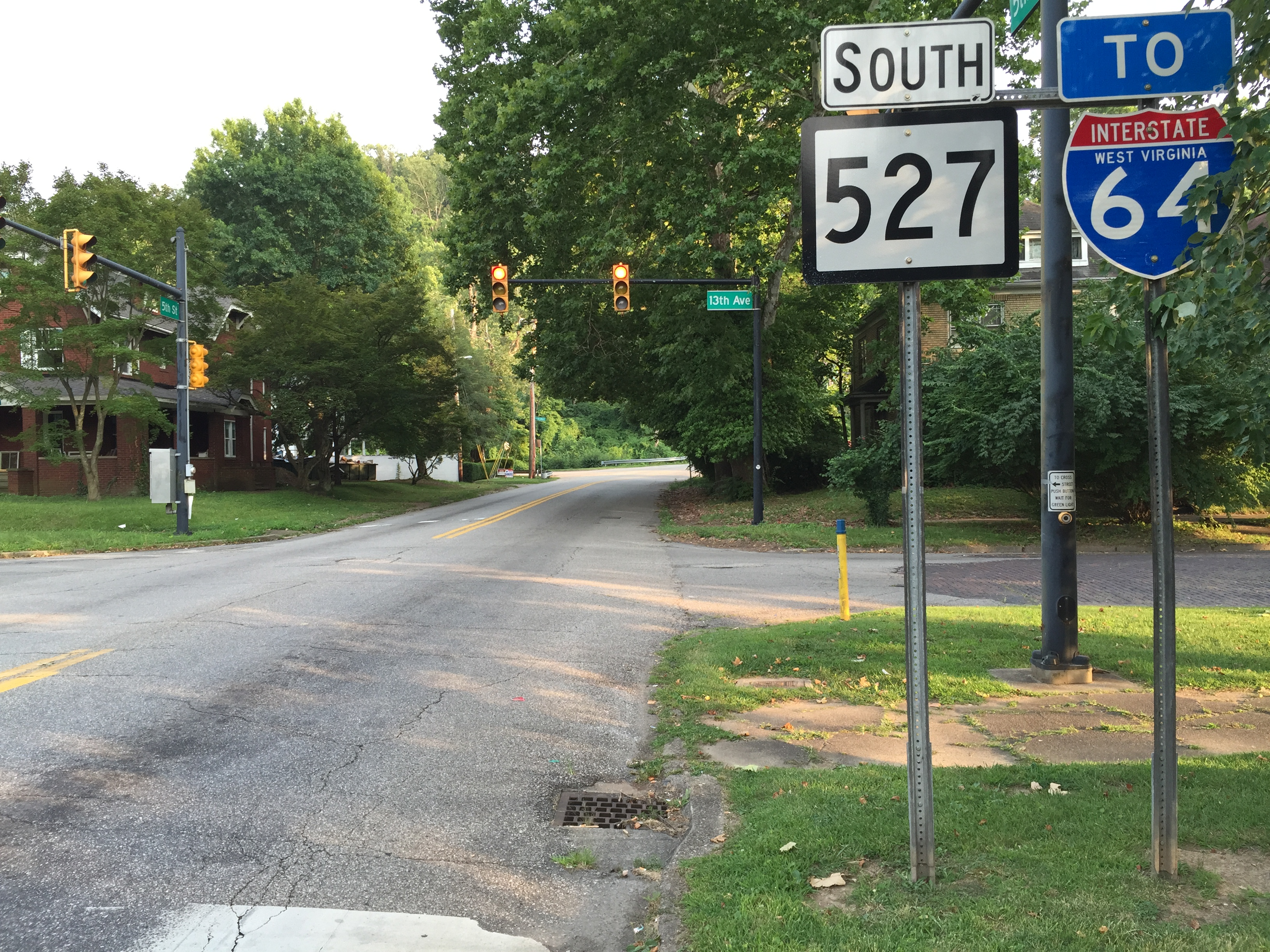
View south along WV 527 at 13th Avenue in Huntington

West Virginia Route 527 is a north–south state highway located entirely in Huntington, West Virginia. The southern terminus of the route is at Interstate 64 exit 8, where WV 527 becomes West Virginia Route 152 upon crossing the expressway. The northern terminus is on the West Virginia Department of Transportation-maintained Robert C. Byrd Bridge, better known as the Sixth Street Bridge, where the route becomes State Route 527 upon crossing into Ohio. In Ohio, SR 527 continues northward to State Route 7 in Chesapeake.

West Virginia State Route 527 currently follows the former routing of U.S. Route 52 in Huntington. While the current Sixth Street Bridge was opened to traffic in 1995, its predecessor once carried U.S. Route 52 across the Ohio River to SR 7 where it turned west toward Portsmouth, Ohio. The current numbering of 527 is derived from WVDOT's internal system for designating roads which is designated as Route 52/7 (running from US 52 to Ohio State Route 7).

The southern terminus of WV 527 is most unusual, as it also serves as the northern terminus of WV 152, which continues along the same street as it passes over I-64 (both state routes are indicated on exit signage on the expressway). WV 152 continues along the former routing of US 52 until its intersection with US 52 four miles (6 km) north of Crum.

== Major intersections ==
The entire route is in Huntington, Cabell County.

mi	km	Destinations	Notes
		I-64 / WV 152 south – Wayne, Charleston, Ashland, KY; 5th Street south	I-64 exit 8; roadway continues as 5th Street
		US 60 east (5th Avenue)	One-block overlap (southbound only)
		To US 60 west / 4th Avenue – Downtown Huntington	
		3rd Avenue / Veterans Memorial Boulevard (US 60 west)	Interchange
		SR 527 north to SR 7 – Chesapeake	Ohio state line (6th Street Bridge over Ohio River)
1.000 mi = 1.609 km; 1.000 km = 0.621 mi: Concurrency terminus
