= Ohio State Route 527 =

State highway in Lawrence County, Ohio, US

State Route 527

Route information
- Maintained by ODOT
- Length: 0.74 mi (1,190 m)
- Existed: 1970–present

Major junctions
- South end: WV 527 in Chesapeake
- North end: SR 7 near Chesapeake

Location
- Country: United States
- State: Ohio
- Counties: Lawrence

Highway system
- Ohio State Highway System; Interstate; US; State; Scenic
← SR 526	→ SR 528

State Route 527 (SR 527) is a north–south state highway in the southern portion of the U.S. state of Ohio. Its southern terminus is at the Ohio River in Chesapeake, where the Robert C. Byrd Bridge carries travelers across to Huntington, West Virginia. Its northern terminus is at State Route 7 at the partially completed Chesapeake bypass just northeast of the Chesapeake corporation limits. SR 527 connects to the same-numbered route in a neighboring state, continuing as West Virginia Route 527.

== Route description ==
SR 527 heads north from the southern terminus as a four–lane highway. The route begins a signed concurrency with SR 7 at a traffic light, however unlike other concurrencies in the state, the higher numbered highway is officially designated on the road. SR 527 continues north while SR 7 has an official gap in the road. The northern terminus of SR 527 is at an incomplete trumpet interchange with SR 7, with SR 7 heading southwest and some modified ramps providing access to nearby local and county roads.

None of SR 527 is included as a part of the National Highway System (NHS).

== History ==
SR 527 was originally certified in 1970, routed from the West Virginia state line to U.S. Route 52, 1-mile (1.6 km) west of Chesapeake. In 1979, the routing was changed to its current alignment, and the former alignment was certified as U.S. Route 52.

=== From 1938 to 1941 ===
A prior routing of SR 527 was originally established in 1938, running from Ghent (in Bath Township) to Kent along previously and currently unnumbered roads. This route was decertified in 1941.

== Major intersections ==
The entire route is in Chesapeake, Lawrence County.

mi	km	Destinations	Notes
0.00	0.00	WV 527 south to US 60 – Huntington	West Virginia state line; Robert C. Byrd Bridge
0.19	0.31	SR 7 north / 3rd Avenue – Proctorville	Southern end of SR 7 concurrency
0.74	1.19	SR 7 south to US 52 – Ironton	Northern end of SR 7 concurrency; interchange
1.000 mi = 1.609 km; 1.000 km = 0.621 mi: Concurrency terminus
