= List of highways numbered 525 =

The following highways are numbered 525:

== Australia ==
- Arthurs Lake Road, Tasmania
- Stanley Road, Victoria

== Belgium ==
- N525 road

== Canada ==
- Alberta Highway 525
- Manitoba Provincial Road 525
- New Brunswick Route 525
- Ontario Highway 525

== Ireland ==
- R525 regional road

== United Kingdom ==
- A525 road

== United States ==
- Florida State Road 525 (former)
- Kentucky Route 525
- Louisiana Highway 525
- New Mexico State Road 525
- County Route 525 (New Jersey)
- Texas
  - Farm to Market Road 525
- Puerto Rico Highway 525
- Washington State Route 525

Preceded by 524	Lists of highways 525	Succeeded by 526
