= Robert C. Byrd Bridge =

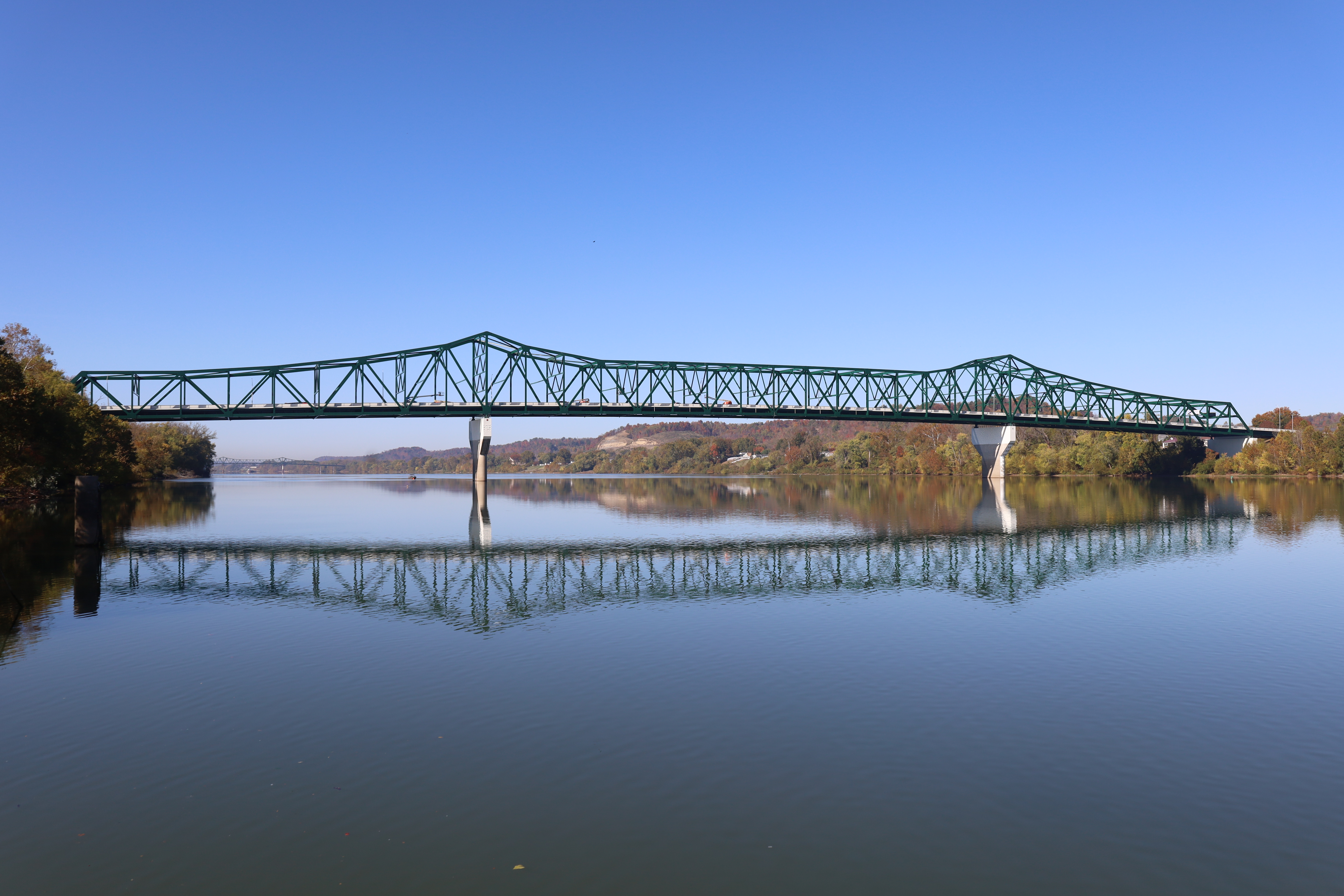
- The bridge in 2023
- Coordinates: 38°25′28″N 82°27′05″W
- Carries: 4 lanes of SR 527 / WV 527
- Crosses: Ohio River
- Locale: Chesapeake, Ohio and Huntington, West Virginia
- Maintained by: West Virginia Department of Transportation

Characteristics
- Design: continuous truss bridge
- Total length: 2105 ft (641,6 m)
- Longest span: 720 ft (219 m)

History
- Opened: November 6, 1994

Location
- Interactive map of Robert C. Byrd Bridge

The Robert C. Byrd Bridge is a 720-foot (220 m) continuous truss bridge that crosses the Ohio River between Huntington, West Virginia and Chesapeake, Ohio.

== History ==
=== Original bridge ===
The previous bridge, opened in 1926, was Huntington's first bridge across the Ohio River and was designed in a gothic style, complete with four two-ton spires that rested on top of each peak. It was a narrow, two-lane structure.

The old 6th Street Bridge closed in the summer of 1993 to allow for the construction of the ramps and approaches of the new bridge in West Virginia and Ohio. It was demolished after 69 years of service in a spectacular implosion on July 17, 1995.

The famous spires which once adorned the top of the former span were saved. One is currently on display outside of the Chesapeake City Hall at the intersection of State Route 7 and the Robert C. Byrd Bridge. Two others are installed along 9th Street between 3rd and 5th Avenues.

=== Current bridge ===
The groundbreaking ceremony for the four-lane bridge was held on April 30, 1991. James Watkins, of the Ohio Department of Transportation, stated that the importance of the new four-lane span would only be heightened by the construction of the Chesapeake–Proctorville State Route 7 bypass that would "begin in 1996." Work on the bypass did not begin until 2000.

The new bridge was named the Robert C. Byrd Bridge under an executive order from former Governor Gaston Caperton to honor the U.S. senator from West Virginia, who is credited with obtaining the funding for the project that was completed on November 6, 1994. The $32.6 million bridge was constructed with $1.4 million coming from Ohio, $5.6 million coming from West Virginia, and $25.3 million in federal funds.

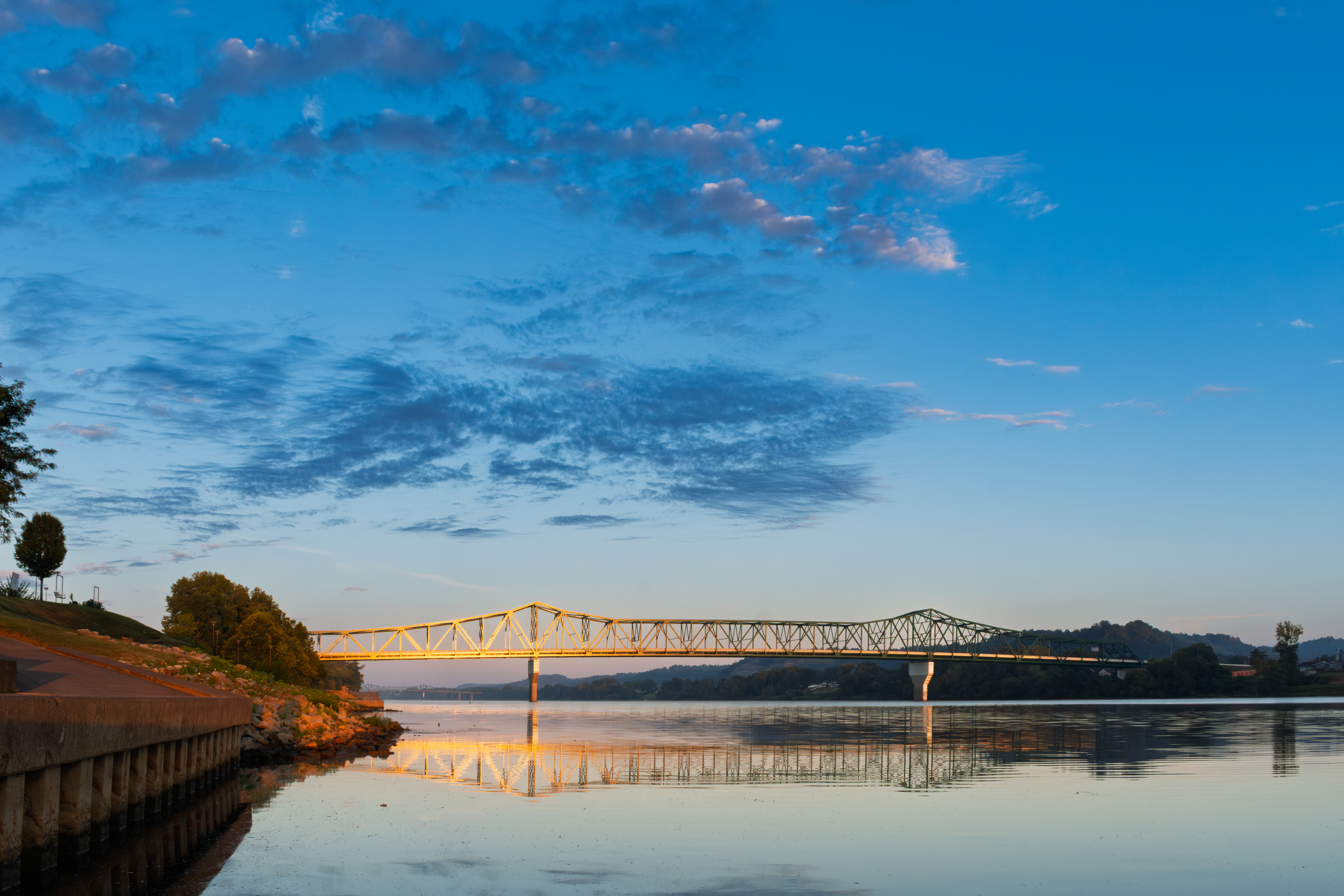
The Robert C. Byrd Bridge, viewed from Harris Riverfront Park in Huntington, West Virginia, spans the Ohio River, connecting Huntington to Chesapeake, Ohio.

== See also ==
- List of crossings of the Ohio River
- Transportation in Huntington, West Virginia
