= Ohio State Route 383 =

State highway in Perry County, Ohio, US

State Route 383

Route information
- Maintained by ODOT
- Length: 1.50 mi (2.41 km)
- Existed: 1935–present

Major junctions
- South end: CR 60 near Somerset
- North end: SR 13 near Somerset

Location
- Country: United States
- State: Ohio
- Counties: Perry

Highway system
- Ohio State Highway System; Interstate; US; State; Scenic
← SR 382	→ SR 384

State Route 383 (SR 383) is a 1.50-mile-long (2.41 km) north south state highway in the central portion of the U.S. state of Ohio. The highway is a spur route whose southern terminus is at the entrance to Ohio's oldest Catholic Church, Saint Joseph's, nearly two miles (3.2 km) southeast of Somerset. County Road 60 (CR 60, Old Somerset Road) picks up where SR 383 leaves off heading southeast from the church entrance. The northern terminus of SR 383 is at a T-intersection with SR 13 just 0.50 miles (0.80 km) east of the village limits of Somerset.

== Route description ==
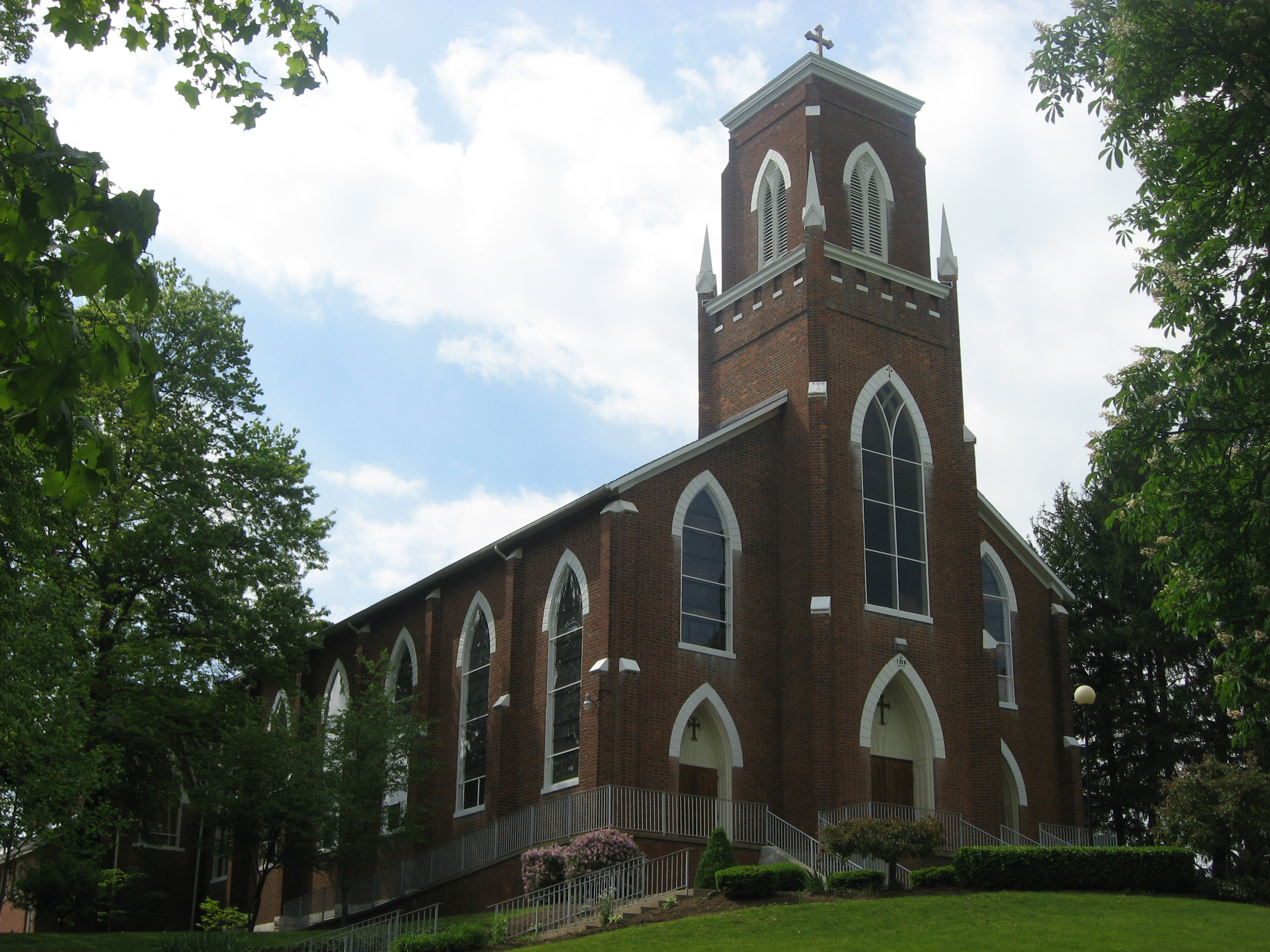
Saint Joseph's Catholic Church

All of SR 383 is situated within Reading Township in northern Perry County. The spur route begins at the entrance to Saint Joseph Church nearly two miles (3.2 km) southeast of Somerset, a location that marks the northern end of CR 60 (Old Somerset Road). SR 383 travels in a northwesterly direction amid primarily open fields, with some trees and houses also appearing alongside the highway for its entire length. It intersects CR 45 (Big Inch Road) en route to its endpoint at a T-intersection with SR 13.

This state route is not included as a part of the National Highway System.

== History ==
SR 383 was created in 1935. The highway has served as a spur route off of SR 13 southeast of Somerset throughout its entire history. Originally an earth-surfaced highway, SR 383 was paved by 1942.

== Major intersections ==
The entire route is in Reading Township, Perry County.

mi	km	Destinations	Notes
0.00	0.00	CR 60 (Old Somerset Road)	Entrance to Saint Joseph Church
1.50	2.41	SR 13	
1.000 mi = 1.609 km; 1.000 km = 0.621 mi
