= Ridgeville Corners, Ohio =

- Census-designated place
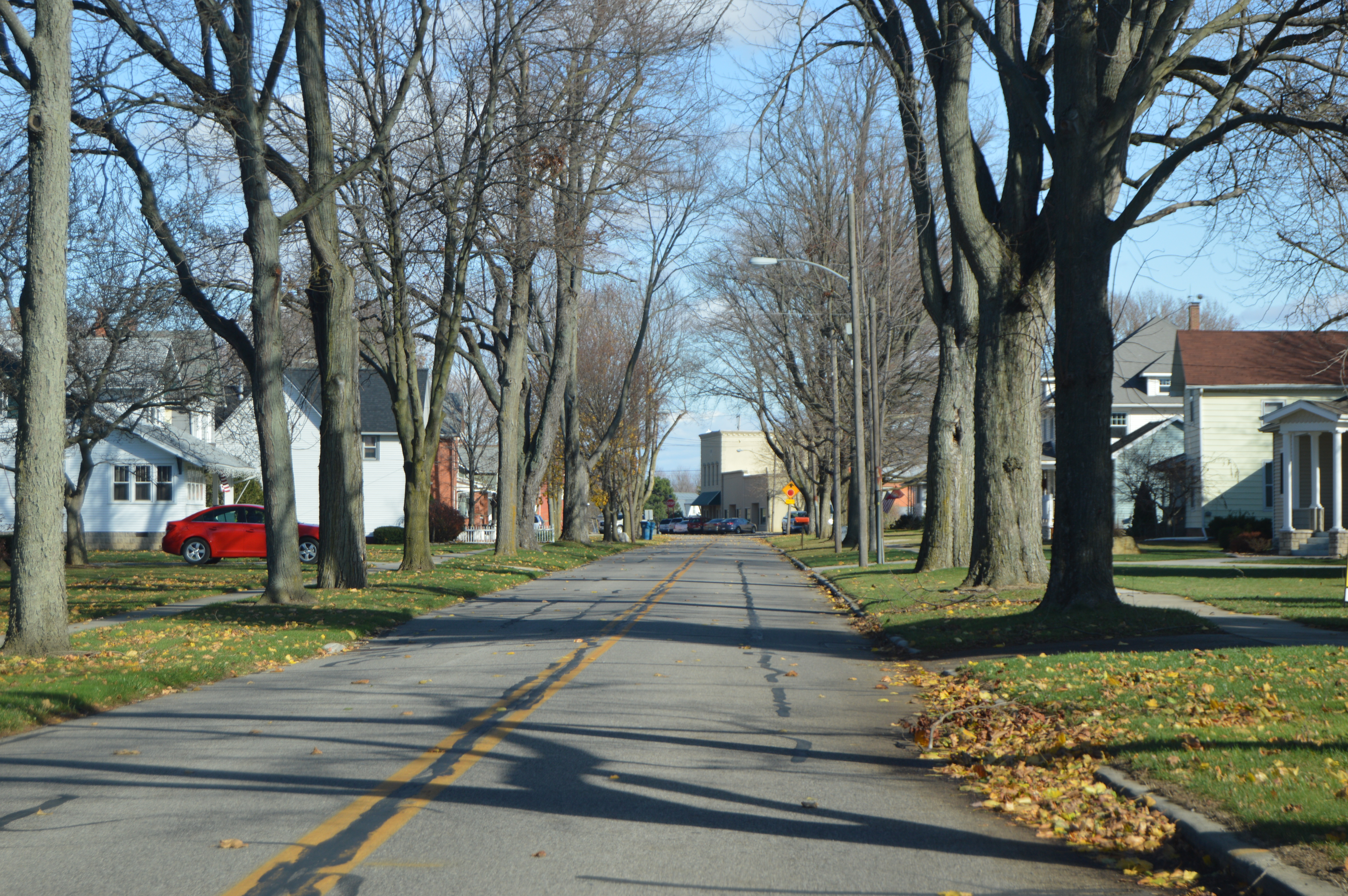
- Tree-lined street southwest of the post office

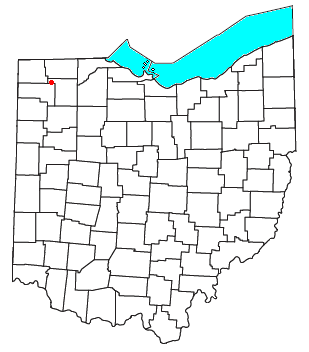
- Location of Ridgeville Corners, Ohio
- Coordinates: 41°26′23″N 84°15′05″W
- Country: United States
- State: Ohio
- County: Henry
- Township: Ridgeville

Area
  - Total: 0.92 sq mi (2.37 km^{2})
  - Land: 0.92 sq mi (2.37 km^{2})
  - Water: 0 sq mi (0.00 km^{2})
- Elevation: 738 ft (225 m)

Population (2020)
  - Total: 416
  - Density: 454.9/sq mi (175.65/km^{2})
- Time zone: UTC-5 (Eastern (EST))
  - Summer (DST): UTC-4 (EDT)
- ZIP code: 43555
- Area code: 419
- FIPS code: 39-67104
- GNIS feature ID: 2628960

Ridgeville Corners is an unincorporated community and census-designated place (CDP) in southern Ridgeville Township, Henry County, Ohio, United States. The population was 416 at the 2020 census.

== History ==
Ridgeville Corners was laid out at an unknown date as an early trading point of Ridgeville Township. The First Congregational Church in Ridgeville Corners was a stop on the Underground Railroad in the mid-1800s. A post office has been in operation at Ridgeville Corners since 1841.

== Geography ==
Ridgeville Corners is located along U.S. Route 6, approximately 7 miles (11 km) northwest of Napoleon, the Henry county seat. It is located 16 miles (26 km) southeast of Bryan.

According to the United States Census Bureau, the CDP has an area of 0.93 square miles (2.4 km^{2}), all of it recorded as land. As its name suggests, Ridgeville Corners sits on high ground, with the northwest side draining towards the Tiffin River, a south-flowing tributary of the Maumee River, and the southeast side of the community draining directly to the Maumee.

== Demographics ==
Historical population
Census	Pop.	Note	%±
2020	416		—
U.S. Decennial Census

== Gallery ==
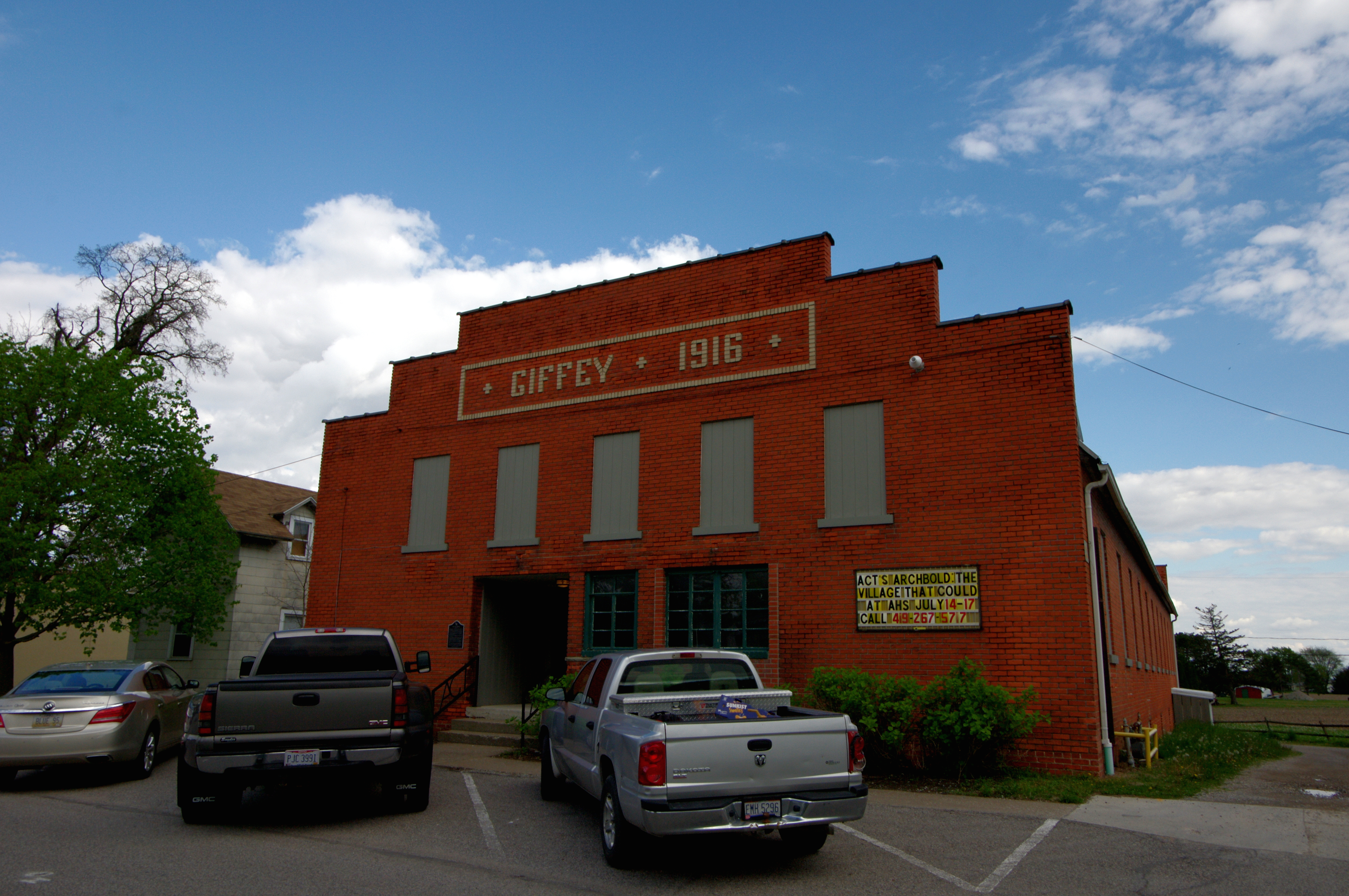
Giffey Hall, built in 1916, now the Archbold Community Theater

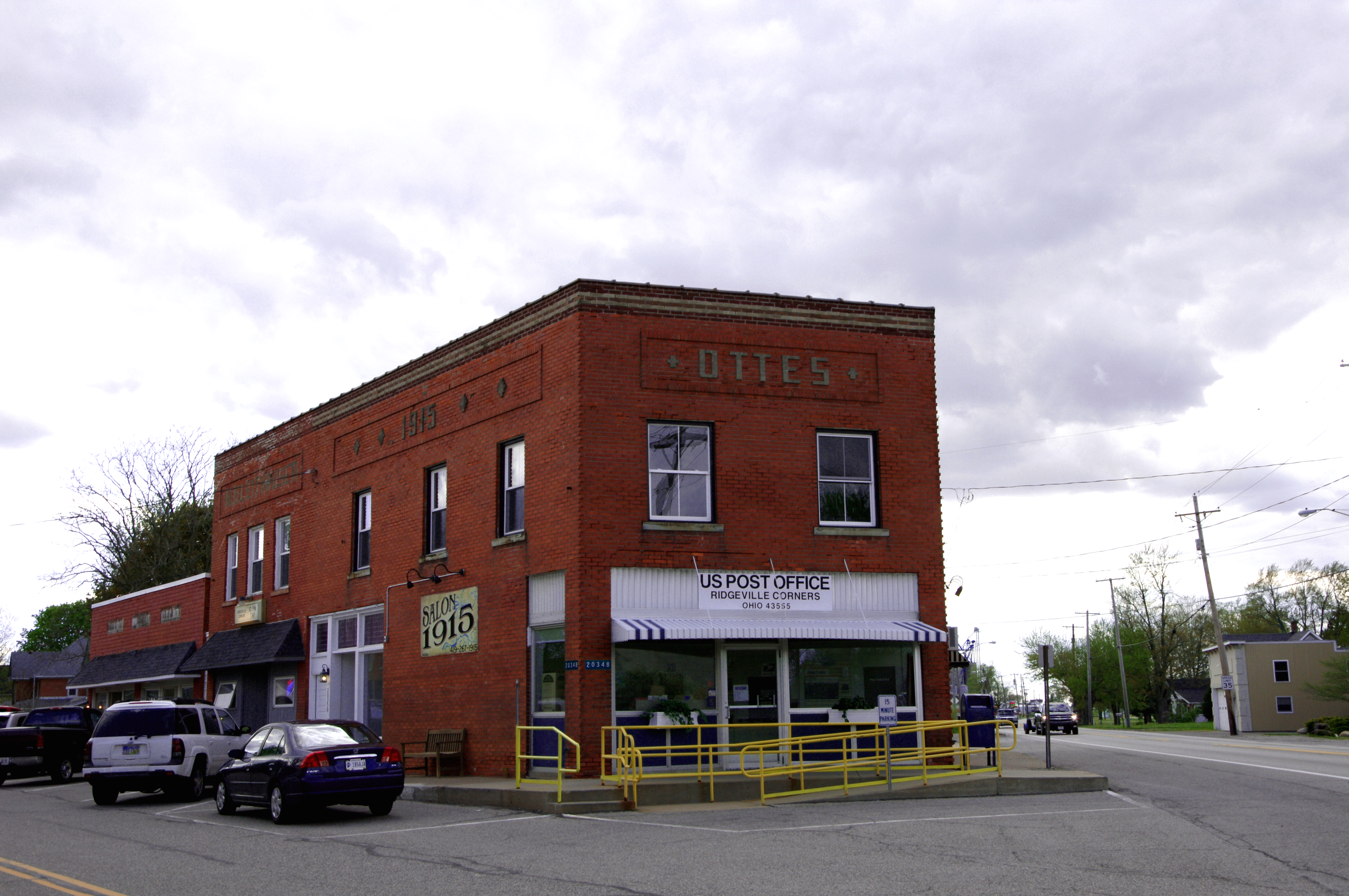
The intersection of U.S. Route 6 and County Road X. Site of the Ottes building, 1916, now home to the Ridgeville Corners Post Office and local businesses.
