= Mohicanville, Ohio =

Unincorporated community in Ohio, U.S.

Coordinates: 40°43′41″N 82°11′29″W

Mohicanville is an unincorporated community in Ashland County, in the U.S. state of Ohio.

== History ==
Mohicanville was laid out in 1833. The community takes its name from the nearby Mohican River. A post office called Mohican was established in 1837, and remained in operation until 1907.
