= Virginia Kendall State Park Historic District =

Historic district in Ohio, United States

- U.S. National Register of Historic Places
- U.S. Historic district
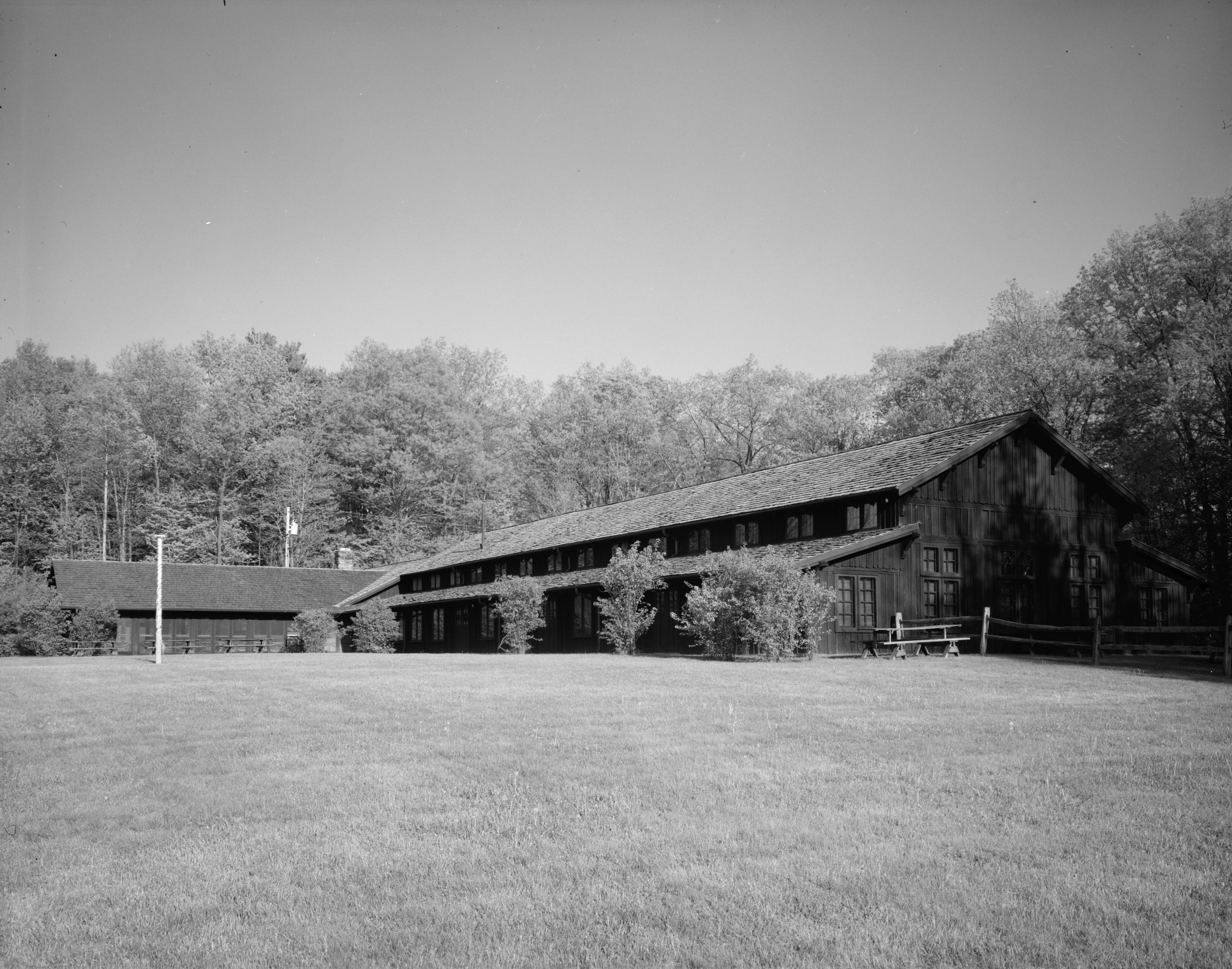

- Location within Ohio Location within the United States
- Nearest city: Peninsula, Ohio
- Coordinates: 41°13′4″N 81°31′15″W
- Area: 530 acres (210 ha)
- Built: 1933
- Architect: Harold S. Wagner; Albert H. Good
- MPS: Recreation and Conservation Resources of the Cuyahoga Valley MPS
- NRHP reference No.: 96001515
- Added to NRHP: January 2, 1997

The Virginia Kendall State Park Historic District is a historic district located near Peninsula, Ohio. It was added to the National Register of Historic Places in 1997.

== Historic ==
The Virginia Kendall State Park Historic District consists of approximately 530 acres in the Cuyahoga Valley National Park, and reflects the naturalistic landscape style and rustic architecture associated with the Civilian Conservation Corps. Cleveland coal baron and industrialist Hayward Kendall acquired this property in the first part of the 20th century for use as a hunting retreat. Upon his death in 1927 the property transferred to his wife, Agnes, with the stipulation that it would eventually become a park named in honor of his mother, Virginia. Agnes Kendall was not interested in the property and turned it over to the state in 1929.

In 1933 Harold S. Wagner, the Director-Secretary of the Akron Metropolitan Park District in Summit County, Ohio, filed with the National Park Service to create a Civilian Conservation Corps camp at Virginia Kendall Park. Approval of the application required evidence of the ability to work with the rustic architecture style. Harold Wagner partnered with Akron architect Albert Good, who had previously designed the rustic lodges of the adjacent Boy Scout Camp Manatoc. Good went on to edit Park and Recreation Structures and Park Structures and Facilities, which are the definitive "parkitecture" books for the National Park Service.

In 1976, the park was transferred from the state to the county and national parks (at the time the latter was called the Cuyahoga Valley National Recreation Area or CVNRA), and on January 1, 1978, the county portion was transferred to the CVNRA.

Virginia Kendall Park consists of four naturalistic style landscapes designed around the sandstone ledges that mark the prehistoric edges of Lake Erie. Built by the Civilian Conservation Corps, the drives, parking areas, meadows and wooded areas were all carefully laid out using the National Park Service's master planning process. The buildings were incorporated into the landscape rather than the landscape framing the buildings. Man-made improvements to the landscape were designed to harmonize with the natural patterns. Locally quarried sandstone and wormy chestnut were used to construct numerous comfort stations and shelters that anchor "playstead" meadows. The shelters evidence sophisticated design and placement; the Octagon Shelter located on the top of a knoll, the Ledges Shelter's rectilinear plan parallels the ledge wall face and the Lake Shelter sited at the base of a hill that fronts the man-made lake surrounded by rolling hills.
