= Williams Center, Ohio =

Unincorporated community in Ohio, U.S.

Coordinates: 41°25′44″N 84°36′37″W

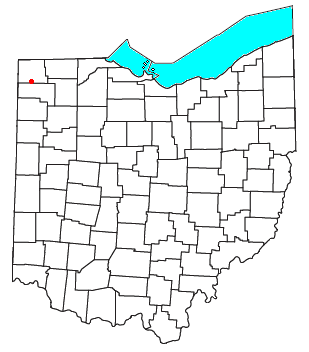
Location of Williams Center, Ohio

Williams Center is an unincorporated community in southeastern Center Township, Williams County, Ohio, United States. It lies at the intersection of State Routes 2 and 576. The headwaters of the Little Lick Creek, a subsidiary of the Maumee River through Lick Creek and the Tiffin River, are located around Williams Center. It is located 4¼ miles (6¾ km) southwest of Bryan, the county seat of Williams County.

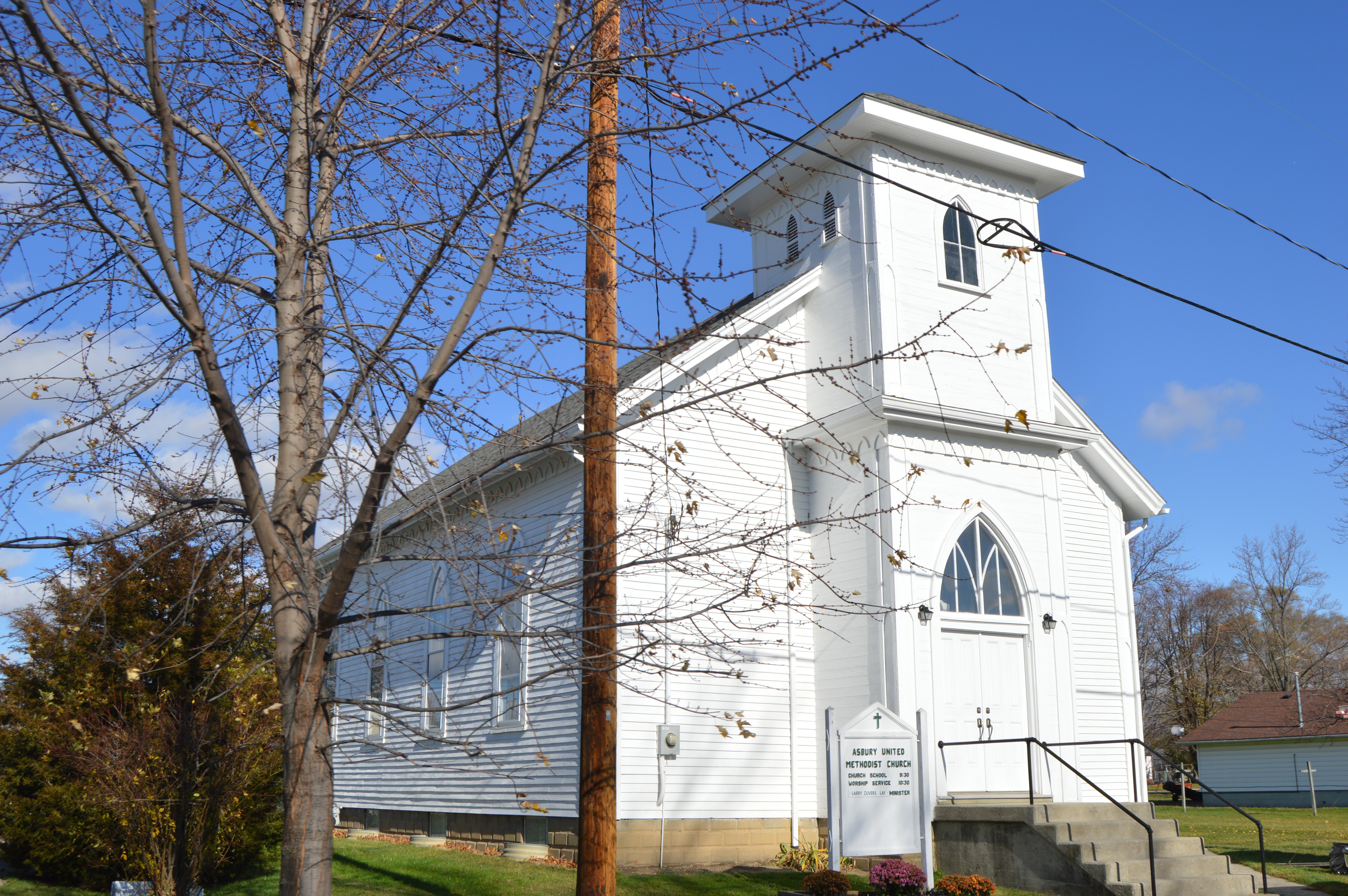
Asbury Methodist Church on Chicago Street

== History ==
Williams Center was originally called Centre, and under the latter name was platted in 1836, and so named on account of its location being near the geographical center of (what was then a larger) Williams County. A post office was established at Williams Center in 1839, and remained in operation until 1903.

Despite its small size, the community has two separate Methodist churches. Before the merger that created the United Methodist Church in 1968, one (now named "Asbury") was a part of The Methodist Church, while the other (now named "Calvary") was a part of the Evangelical United Brethren Church. The latter congregation, founded in 1842, now worships in a former Lutheran church building; the previous Calvary structure burned in 1947, and the members obtained the abandoned Emmanuel Lutheran Church and relocated it in order to use it in Williams Center.
