= Chesapeake, Ohio =

- Village
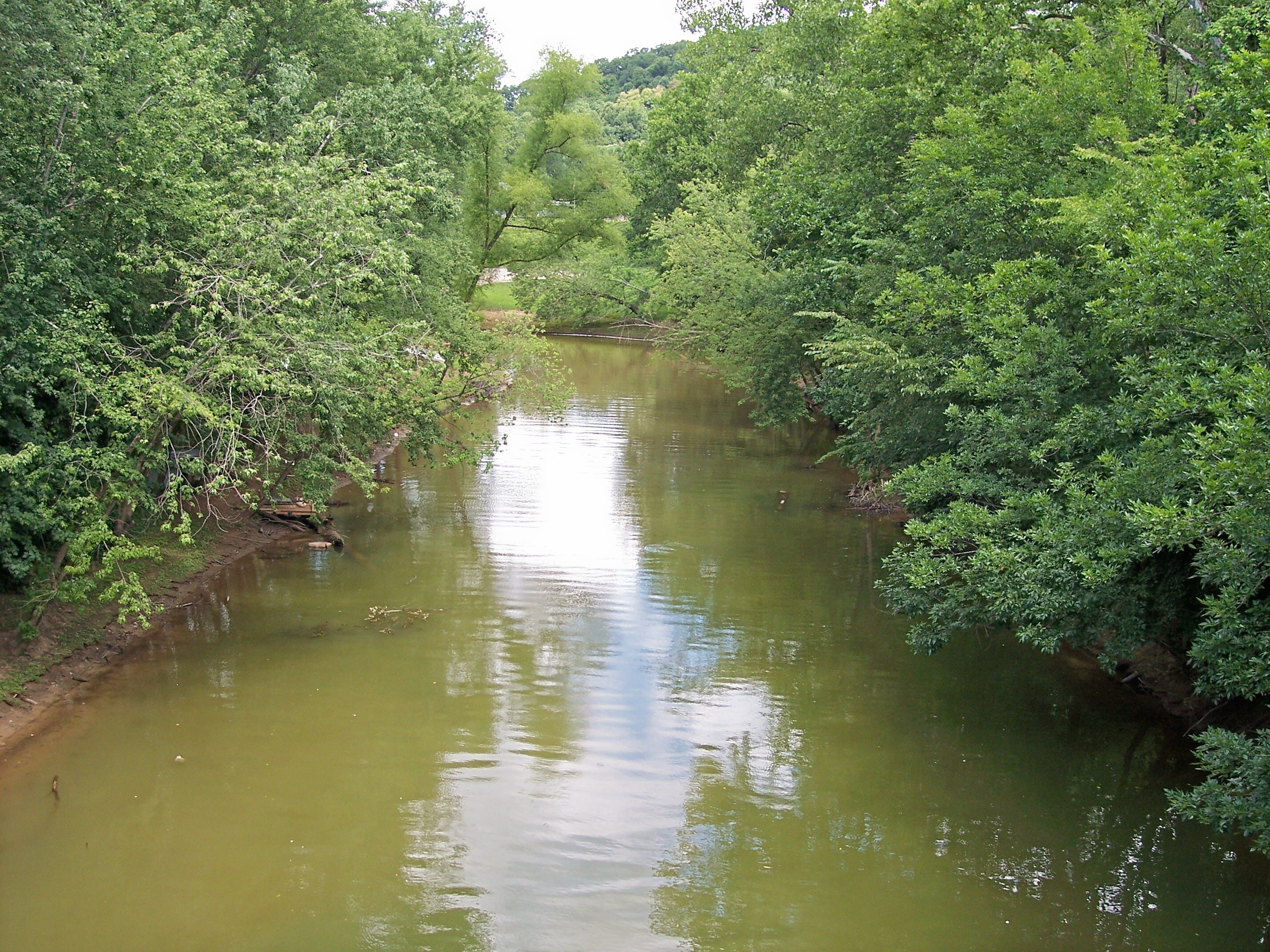
- Symmes Creek at its mouth

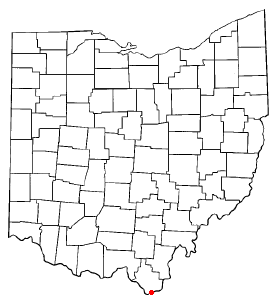
- Location of Chesapeake, Ohio

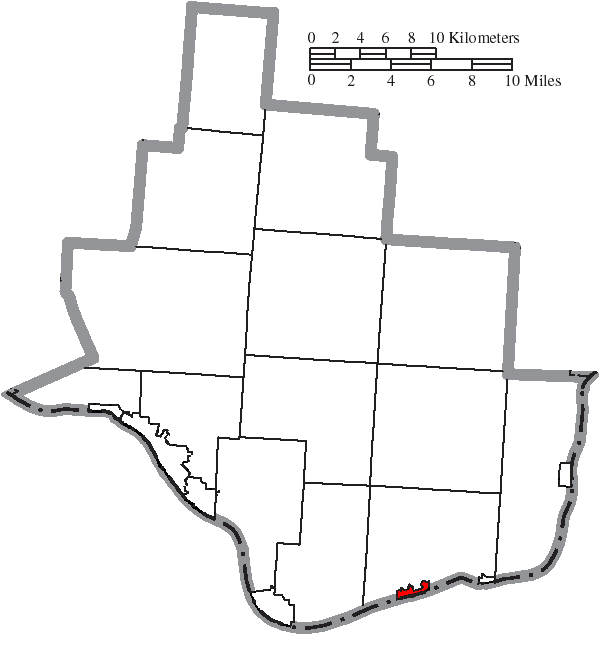
- Location of Chesapeake in Lawrence County
- Coordinates: 38°25′41″N 82°27′23″W
- Country: United States
- State: Ohio
- County: Lawrence
- Township: Union

Government
  - Type: Mayor-council government
  - Mayor: Drew Griffin

Area
  - Total: 0.56 sq mi (1.45 km^{2})
  - Land: 0.47 sq mi (1.23 km^{2})
  - Water: 0.085 sq mi (0.22 km^{2})
- Elevation: 558 ft (170 m)

Population (2020)
  - Total: 765
  - Estimate (2024): 726
  - Density: 1,615/sq mi (623.7/km^{2})
- Time zone: UTC-5 (Eastern (EST))
  - Summer (DST): UTC-4 (EDT)
- ZIP code: 45619
- Area code: 740
- FIPS code: 39-13904
- GNIS feature ID: 2397614

Chesapeake is a village in Lawrence County, Ohio, United States. The population was 765 as of the 2020 census. It lies across the Ohio River from Huntington, West Virginia, at the mouth of Symmes Creek.

The Robert C. Byrd Bridge across the Ohio River connects Chesapeake to Huntington's downtown area. At one time, this was the only bridge connection across the Ohio River linking Ohio to Huntington. In recent years, bridges across the Ohio River connecting Ohio to Huntington's East and West sides have been built.

Chesapeake is a part of the Huntington-Ashland, WV-KY-OH, Metropolitan Statistical Area (MSA).

== History ==
Chesapeake is derived from the Algonquin name for "place where water is spread out".

== Geography ==
According to the United States Census Bureau, the village has a total area of 0.56 square miles (1.45 km^{2}), of which 0.47 square miles (1.22 km^{2}) is land and 0.09 square miles (0.23 km^{2}) is water.

== Demographics ==
Historical population
Census	Pop.	Note	%±
1910	541		—
1920	821		51.8%
1930	1,094		33.3%
1940	1,068		−2.4%
1950	1,285		20.3%
1960	1,396		8.6%
1970	1,364		−2.3%
1980	1,370		0.4%
1990	1,073		−21.7%
2000	842		−21.5%
2010	745		−11.5%
2020	765		2.7%
2024 (est.)	726	▼	−5.1%
U.S. Decennial Census

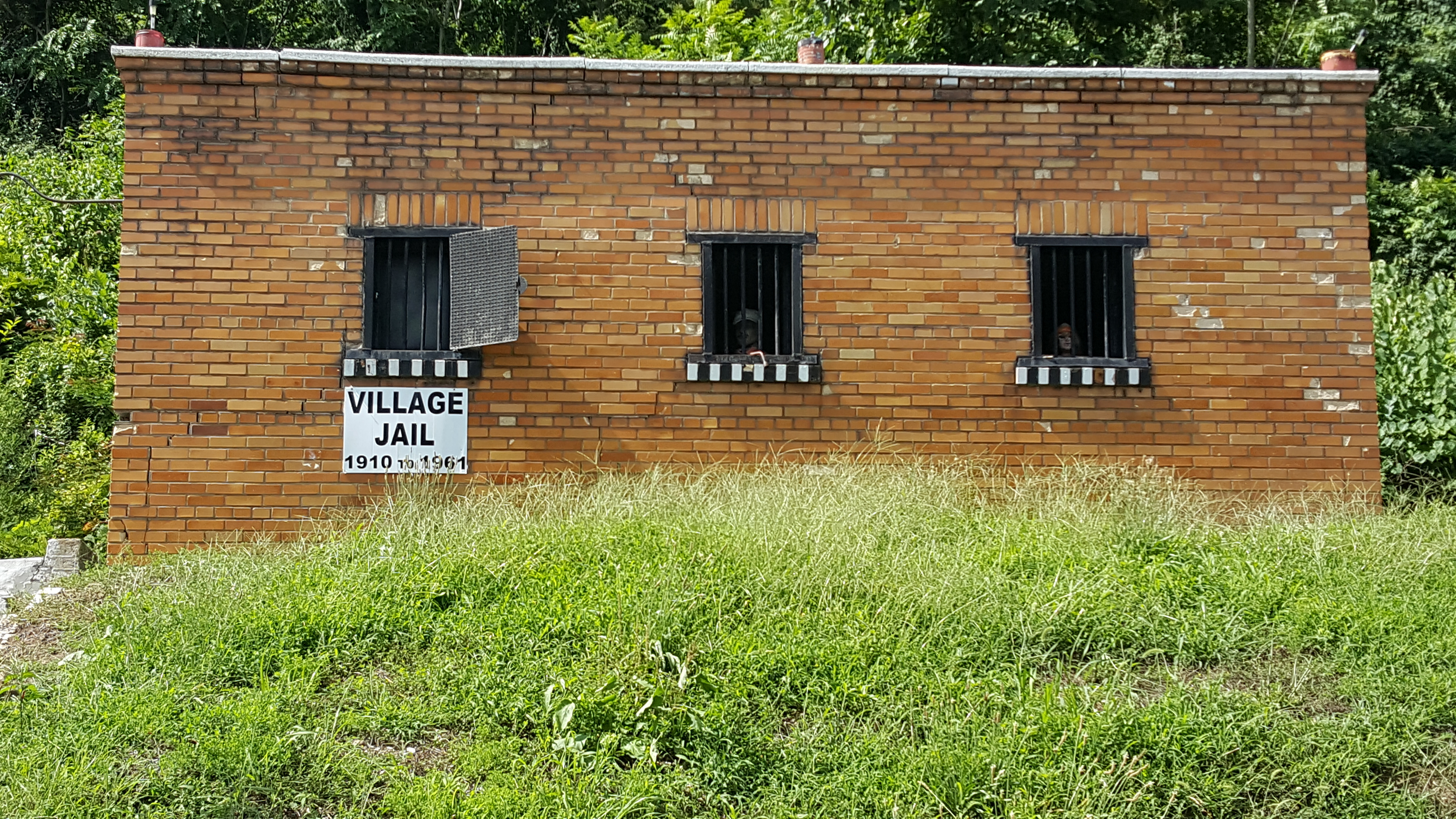
The Chesapeake Village jail was in use from 1910 until 1961

=== 2010 census ===
As of the census of 2010, there were 745 people, 345 households, and 195 families living in the village. The population density was 1,585.1 inhabitants per square mile (612.0/km^{2}). There were 399 housing units at an average density of 848.9 per square mile (327.8/km^{2}). The racial makeup of the village was 96.8% White, 0.5% African American, 0.7% Native American, 0.4% Asian, 0.4% from other races, and 1.2% from two or more races. Hispanic or Latino of any race were 0.9% of the population.

There were 345 households, of which 25.8% had children under the age of 18 living with them, 38.8% were married couples living together, 12.2% had a female householder with no husband present, 5.5% had a male householder with no wife present, and 43.5% were non-families. 37.7% of all households were made up of individuals, and 17.9% had someone living alone who was 65 years of age or older. The average household size was 2.16 and the average family size was 2.86.

The median age in the village was 44.4 years. 20.8% of residents were under the age of 18; 6.9% were between the ages of 18 and 24; 22.5% were from 25 to 44; 28.1% were from 45 to 64; and 21.5% were 65 years of age or older. The gender makeup of the village was 47.4% male and 52.6% female.

=== 2000 census ===
As of the census of 2000, there were 842 people, 395 households, and 231 families living in the village. The population density was 1,523.7 inhabitants per square mile (588.3/km^{2}). There were 441 housing units at an average density of 798.0 per square mile (308.1/km^{2}). The racial makeup of the village was 97.74% White, 0.12% African American, 0.59% Native American, 0.12% Asian, 0.48% from other races, and 0.95% from two or more races. Hispanic or Latino of any race were 1.54% of the population.

Of the 395 households, 23.5% contained children under the age of 18. 42.3% had married couples living together. 11.4% had a female householder with no husband present. 41.3% were non-families. 37.2% of all households were made up of individuals, and 17.0% had someone living alone who was 65 years of age or older. The average household size was 2.13 and the average family size was 2.79.

The ages of the population were spread out, with 20.0% under the age of 18, 9.6% from 18 to 24, 26.4% from 25 to 44, 23.3% from 45 to 64, and 20.8% who were 65 years of age or older. The median age was 42 years. For every 100 females, there were 87.5 males.

The median income for a household in the village was $24,653, and the median income for a family was $31,528. Males had a median income of $32,917 versus $23,500 for females. The per capita income for the village was $19,698. About 14.2% of families and 15.5% of the population were below the poverty line, including 14.5% of those under age 18 and 13.3% of those age 65 or over.

== Arts and culture ==
Chesapeake has a public library, a branch of Briggs Lawrence County Public Library.

== Government ==
The city is run by an elected mayor-council government system.

== Education ==
Chesapeake Union Exempted Village School District operates one elementary school, one middle school, and Chesapeake High School.

== Infrastructure ==
=== Transportation ===
The Lawrence County Airpark is located two nautical miles (2.3 mi; 3.7 km) west of Chesapeake's central business district.

== See also ==
- List of cities and towns along the Ohio River
