= Pee Pee Township, Ohio =

Township in Ohio, US

Pee Pee Township, Pike County, Ohio
- Township
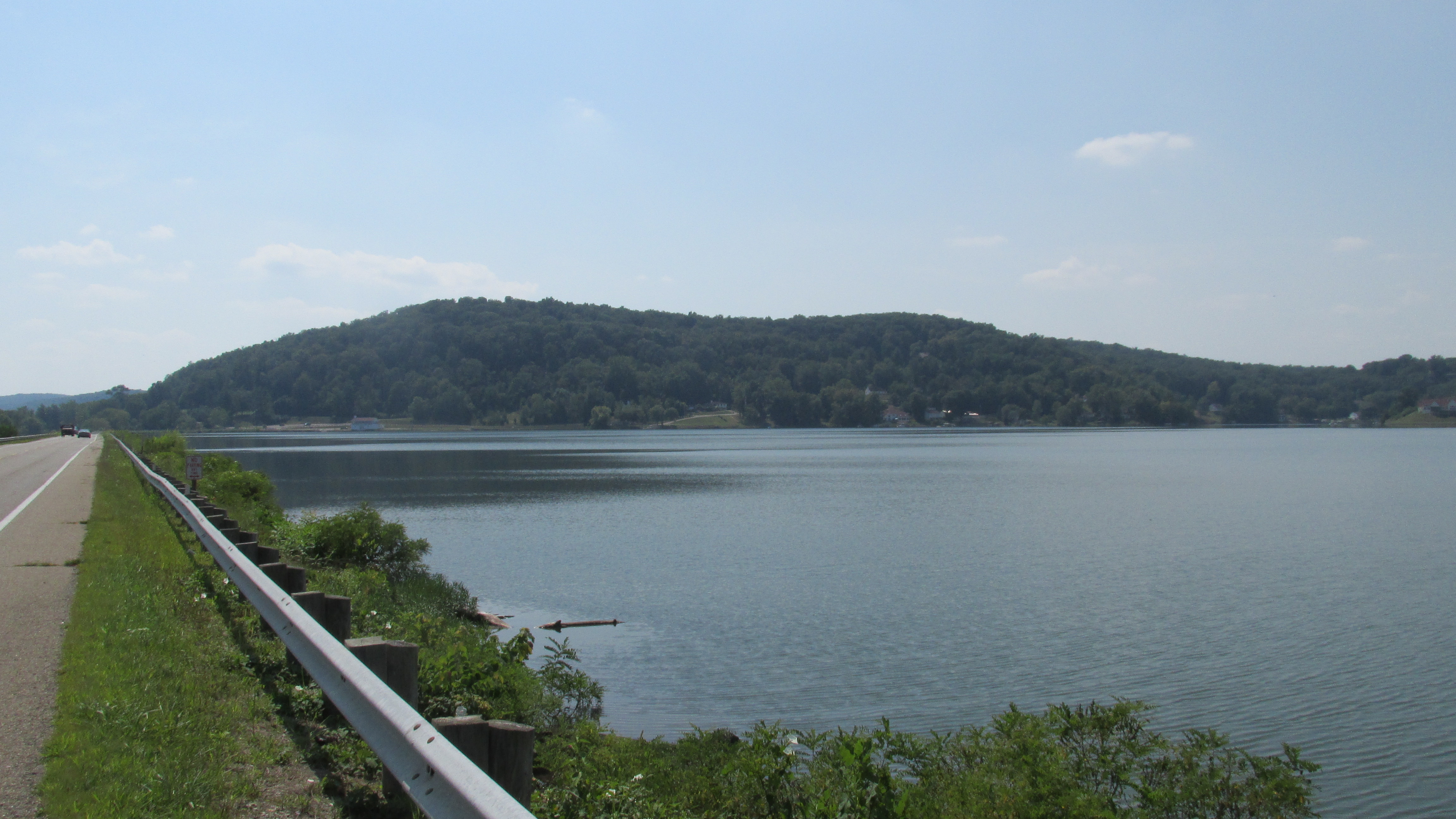
- Lake White

- Flag

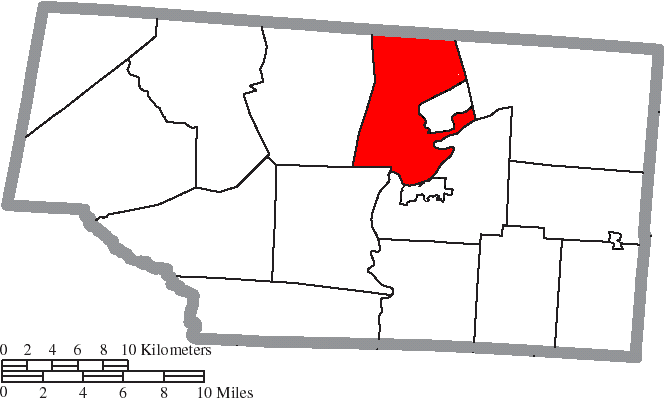
- Location of Pee Pee Township in Pike County
- Coordinates: 39°7′43″N 83°0′34″W
- Country: United States
- State: Ohio
- County: Pike

Area
  - Total: 32.4 sq mi (83.9 km^{2})
  - Land: 31.7 sq mi (82.1 km^{2})
  - Water: 0.69 sq mi (1.8 km^{2})
- Elevation: 702 ft (214 m)

Population (2020)
  - Total: 7,392
  - Density: 230/sq mi (90/km^{2})
- Time zone: UTC-5 (Eastern (EST))
  - Summer (DST): UTC-4 (EDT)
- FIPS code: 39-61434
- GNIS feature ID: 1086815

Pee Pee Township is one of the fourteen townships of Pike County, Ohio, United States. The 2020 census found 7,392 people in the township, including 4,165 people in the village of Waverly, and 3,227 in the unincorporated portions of the township. It is noted for having an unusual name.

== Geography ==
Located in the northern part of the county, it borders the following townships:

- Franklin Township, Ross County – northeast
- Jackson Township – east
- Seal Township – southeast
- Newton Township – southwest
- Pebble Township – west
- Huntington Township, Ross County – northwest

The village of Waverly, the county seat of Pike County, is located in eastern Pee Pee Township.

The 429-acre (1.74 km^{2}) Lake White State Park is also located in this township.

Pee Pee Creek is located in this township. Pee Pee Creek derives its name from Major Paul Paine, a pioneer settler who added his initials to a tree which stood along its banks. Stones taken from Pee Pee Creek were used to construct the chimneys of pioneers' log cabins. Pee Pee Creek is noted for muskellunge fishing.

Pee Pee Township is 32.4 square miles (84 km^{2}) in size, including 0.69 square miles (1.8 km^{2}) of water and 3.92 square miles (10.2 km^{2}) within the village limits of Waverly.

== History ==
Pee Pee Township was organized in 1798 as the first township in Pike County. The township's unusual name has been attributed to the Pee Pee Creek; which was so named when an early settler inscribed his initials P. P. on a tree along its banks. Pee Pee Township has gained attention for its distinctive name, which can also be associated with the slang term "peepee," referring to the penis or urine.

Pee Pee Settlement was a free African-American community that existed around 1820, it was a place that was primarily an area for former slaves from Virginia.

Many who lived in Pee Pee Settlement were active in the Underground Railroad and assisted runaway slaves to freedom in Ohio. Despite violent attacks against the area, Pee Pee Settlement was a vibrant community.

== Government ==
The township is governed by a three-member board of trustees, who are elected in November of odd-numbered years to a four-year term beginning on the following January 1. Two are elected in the year after the presidential election and one is elected in the year before it. There is also an elected township fiscal officer, who serves a four-year term beginning on April 1 of the year after the election, which is held in November of the year before the presidential election. Vacancies in the fiscal officership or on the board of trustees are filled by the remaining trustees.
