= Lake White State Park =

Park in Ohio, USA

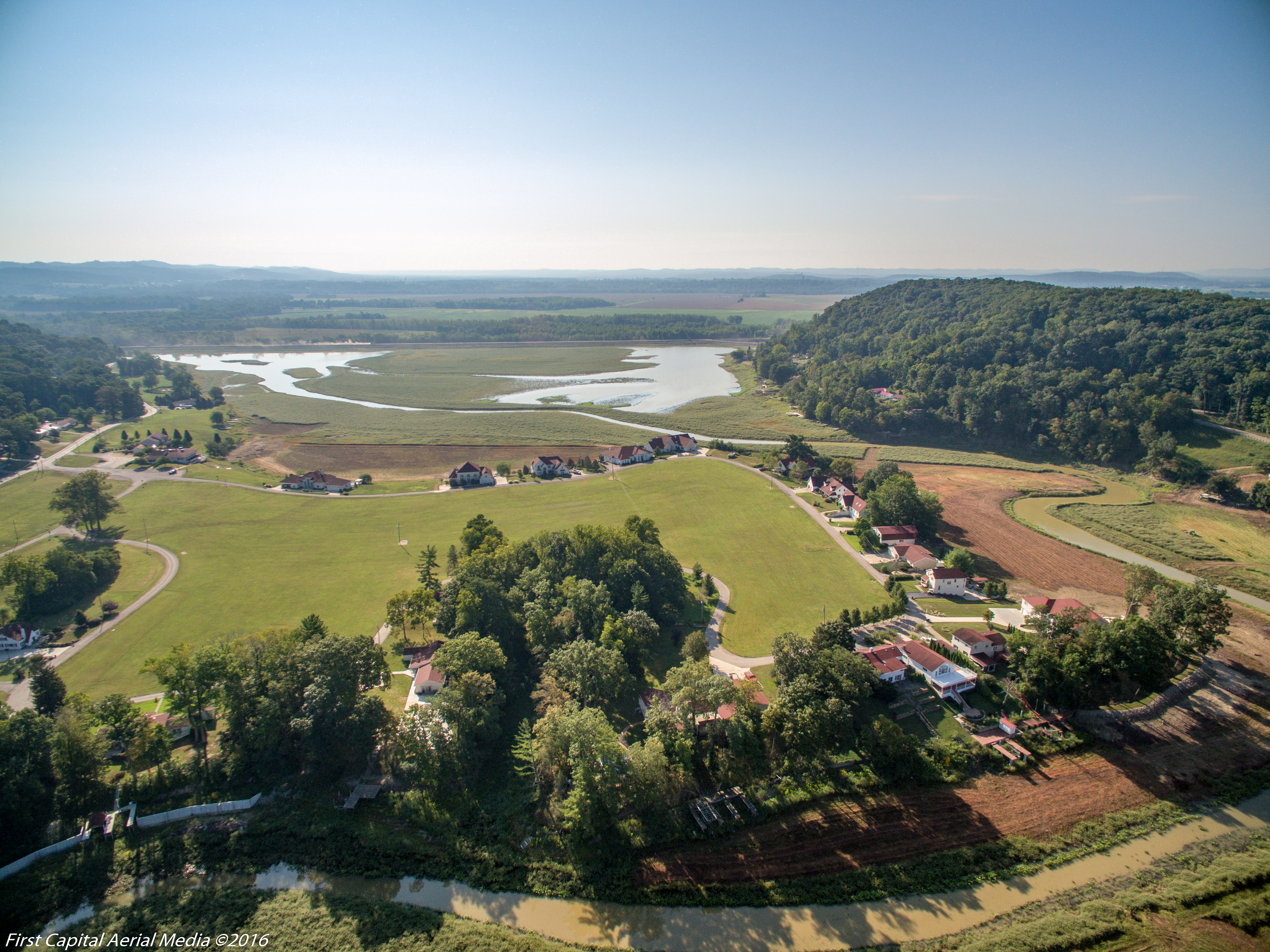
- Lake White drained in 2016

- Location within Ohio Location within the United States
- Location: Pike County, Ohio, United States
- Nearest city: Waverly, Ohio
- Coordinates: 39°05′51″N 83°01′11″W
- Area: Land: 92 acres (37 ha); Water: 337 acres (136 ha)
- Elevation: 597 feet (182 m)
- Established: 1949
- Administrator: Ohio Department of Natural Resources
- Designation: Ohio state park
- Website: Lake White State Park

Lake White State Park is a public recreation area located on the southwest edge of Waverly in Pike County, Ohio, United States. The state park contains 92 acres (37 ha) of land and 337 acres (136 ha) of water.

== History ==
Part of Lake White State Park includes the remains of the old Ohio and Erie Canal channel. The lake was built during the Great Depression by the Works Progress Administration (W.P.A.). Most of the land surrounding the lake is privately owned. Lake White was officially dedicated as a state park in 1949 when the Division of Parks and Recreation was created.

In August 2014, the dam showed signs of leaking and required major repairs. The lake was drained to allow for the process to begin. In July 2015, the Ohio Department of Transportation announced the awarding of a contract to fix the dam and the bridge that goes over it.
