= Waverly, Ohio =

- City
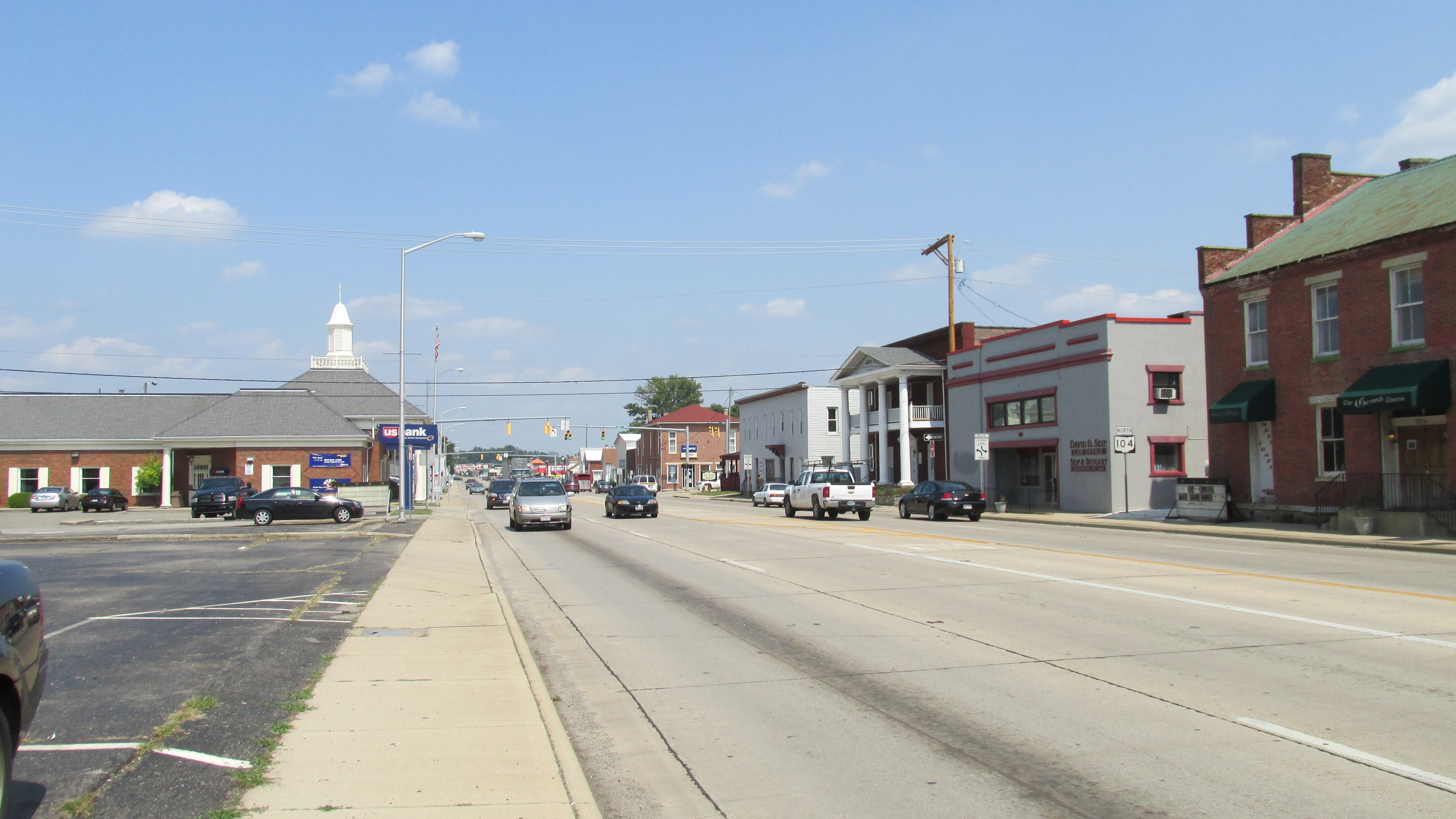
- Downtown Waverly

- Motto: "Working for a Vibrant Future"
- Interactive map of Waverly, Ohio
- Location within Ohio Location within the United States
- Coordinates: 39°07′32″N 82°59′15″W
- Country: United States
- State: Ohio
- County: Pike

Government
  - Mayor: Richard Henderson

Area
  - Total: 4.22 sq mi (10.93 km^{2})
  - Land: 4.16 sq mi (10.78 km^{2})
  - Water: 0.058 sq mi (0.15 km^{2})
- Elevation: 591 ft (180 m)

Population (2020)
  - Total: 4,165
  - Density: 1,000.3/sq mi (386.23/km^{2})
- Time zone: UTC-5 (Eastern (EST))
  - Summer (DST): UTC-4 (EDT)
- ZIP code: 45690
- Area code: 740
- FIPS code: 39-81935
- GNIS feature ID: 1085666
- Website: cityofwaverly.net

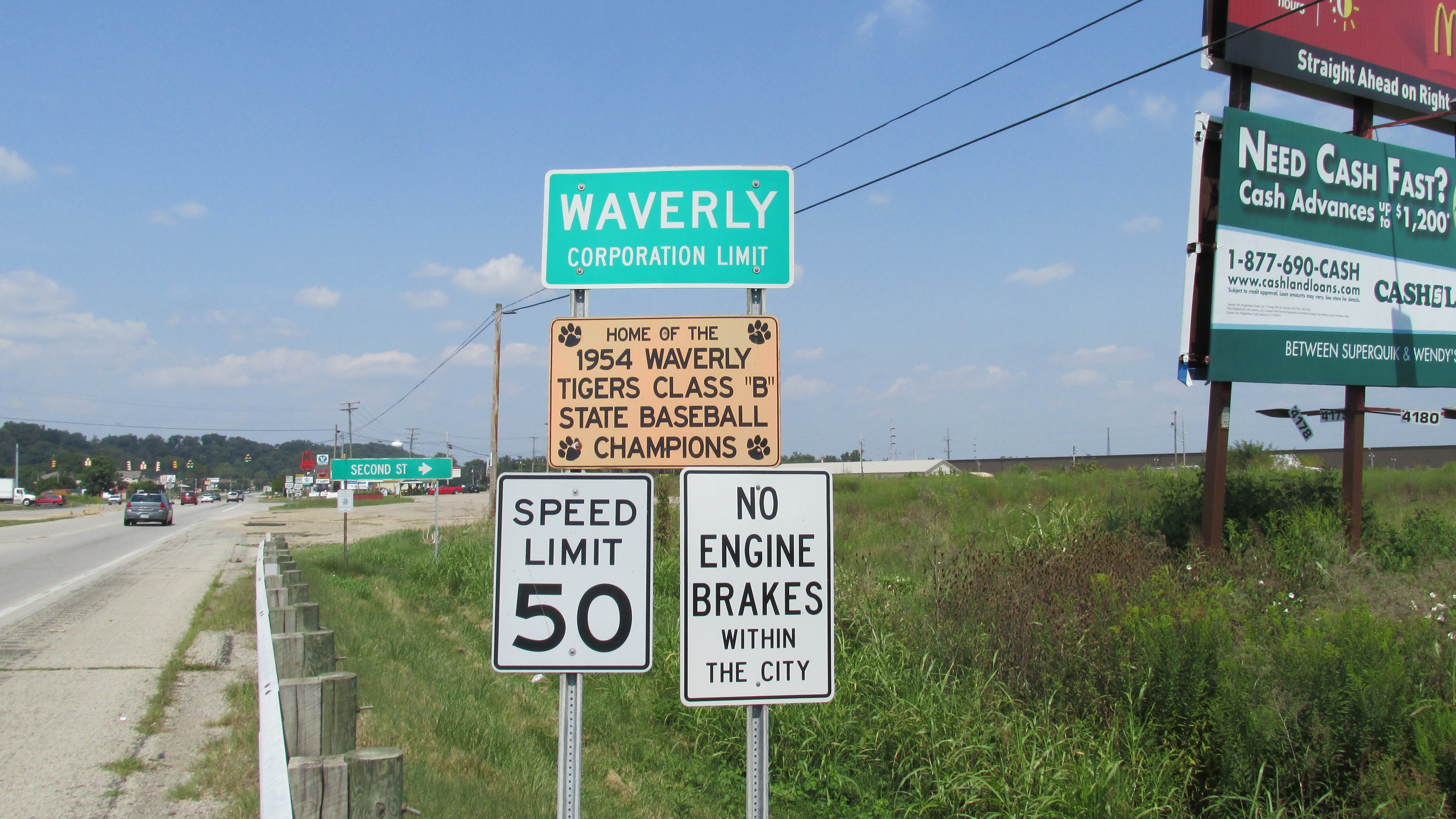
Waverly corporation limit sign

Waverly is a village in, and the county seat of, Pike County, Ohio, United States, located about 14 miles (23 km) south of Chillicothe. The population was 4,165 at the 2020 census. The town was formed in 1829, as the construction of the Ohio and Erie Canal along the west bank of the Scioto River brought new growth to the area. In 1861, the county seat was moved here from Piketon.

Waverly is served by the Garnet A. Wilson Public Library.

== History ==
=== First inhabitants and native cultures ===
Historians believe that Waverly and the surrounding areas were inhabited by nomadic people as early as 13,000 BC. The first historical evidence that can be tied to a particular culture dates back to sometime between the years 1000 and 800 BC, to the culture known as the Adena. The area around Waverly is particularly rich in Adena heritage, including a number of mounds throughout the area. The Adena were given their cognomen from Thomas Worthington's Adena Estate near Chillicothe, where evidence of their culture was found in the early 1900s.

There is evidence pointing to the emergence of the Hopewell culture in the Waverly area beginning about 300 BC. The namesake for the Hopewell is Captain M. C. Hopewell, the owner of the Ross County farmstead where artifacts leading to the discovery of the Hopewell's separate cultural identity were found. Both the Adena and the Hopewell are well known for their mounds, many of which still exist around southern Ohio, including several in Pike County, and just north of Waverly in Chillicothe, Ohio, where the Adena Mound is a registered historic structure. There is evidence of Hopewell in the area until about 600 AD. The cause of the demise of the Hopewell is unknown, and there is not much information available about the people immediately following them. Sometime after 1000 AD, the Fort Ancient people began to occupy southern Ohio, only to disappear in the 17th century, likely decimated by infectious diseases spread in epidemics from early European contact. Some scholars believe that the Fort Ancient people "were ancestors of the historic Shawnee people, or that, at the very least, the historic Shawnees absorbed remnants of these older peoples".

There is a historical gap between evidence of the end of the Fort Ancient presence in the Waverly area and the beginning of the presence of the Shawnee Native American tribe. It is not known whether the Shawnee were descendants of the Fort Ancient, but there are a number of similarities between the two cultures that have led some to speculate that this is the case. There is also evidence to suggest that Siouan nations such as the Mosopelea may be descendants of the Fort Ancient culture. As European settlements began to push into Ohio country, the Shawnee were driven further and further west, and there is an extensive record of the Shawnee's clashes with settlers, including Tecumseh's War and various battles of the War of 1812.

One of the most well-known leaders of the Shawnee tribe, Tecumseh, was born somewhere very close to Waverly, perhaps just north of the city's site, in 1768. As early as the age of 15, after the American Revolutionary War ended in 1783, Tecumseh was fighting alongside other Shawnee to stop the white invasion of their lands by attacking settlers' flatboats traveling down the Ohio River from Pennsylvania. In time, Tecumseh came to lead his own band of warriors and his bravery and leadership have caused him to become an American folk hero and his legend still lives large in Waverly and the surrounding areas.

=== European settlement ===
Although Europeans had been in the area hunting, trapping and surveying for some time prior, not until approximately 1796 did the first Europeans began to settle in the area around Waverly, in what is now Pike County. Pike County was named for General Zebulon Montgomery Pike, who was killed at the storming of York in Upper Canada in the war of 1812–15. He died during the war, on April 25, 1813, aged 35, and is considered a war hero, many landmarks and geographic areas being named after him.

Waverly was platted in about 1829 by a M. Downing, and it had 306 inhabitants by 1840. It was originally known as Uniontown; Francis Cleveland suggested changing the name to Waverly. He is believed to have done this because he was an admirer of Sir Walter Scott's Waverley novels.

=== The Ohio and Erie Canal ===
The Ohio and Erie Canal, which was completed to Waverly in the early 1830s, transformed the landscape of southern Ohio in many ways, and played a major part in the development of Waverly and its surrounding areas. The initial plan for the Canal's route was likely not through Waverly, and it is believed that several noteworthy interested parties, including Robert Lucas and James Emmitt, had a hand in redirecting the route of the Canal to pass through or near their land, thereby benefiting them personally. Robert Lucas plotted the Canal right through his land near Jasper, while Emmitt had many interests in Waverly on the canal route, and owned the first canalboat to pass through the Canal, the Governor Worthington.

=== The battle for the county seat ===
After several years of political battle, the county seat of Pike County was moved from Piketon to Waverly in 1861, and Waverly remains the county seat to this day. In 1859, James Emmitt led a group of supporters to petition to remove the county seat to Waverly, which met with strong resistance from those with an interest in keeping the seat in Piketon which had been the county seat for over 45 years. To finally push the removal across the line, those in favor of moving the county seat to Waverly promised to provide a new courthouse as a gift to the people of Pike County in Waverly. This courthouse still stands on Second Street in Waverly.

Additionally, a number of parties including James Emmitt created a bridge across the Scioto River in Waverly, which up until that point had required chartering a ferry boat to cross – this was no doubt another incentive to move the seat to Waverly. In the end, despite a number of reported irregularities in the special election, the Waverly supporters were victorious, and on November 11, 1861, the county commissioners ordered the removal of the county offices to Waverly pending the completion of suitable rooms to accommodate the move, which happened shortly thereafter.

=== James Emmitt and The Historic Emmitt House ===
James Emmitt was one of Waverly's most prominent inhabitants in the nineteenth century and was one of the wealthiest and most influential southern Ohioans of the time. Emmitt was involved in a number of successful ventures, including distilleries, mills, canal boat ventures and various manufacturing businesses. Perhaps the most well-known of Emmitt's ventures is the Emmitt House, the restaurant and tavern that bore his name; it burned down in January 2014, having stood since 1861.

Carpenter Madison Hemings was involved in the building of the Emmitt House. Hemings is rumored to be the son of President Thomas Jefferson, whom Jefferson fathered with Sally Hemings, a slave owned by Jefferson. There has been some evidence linking Madison Hemings to Jefferson, but historians continue to debate the issue.

=== The Civil War through the atomic era ===
During the Civil War years of 1861-1865, Waverly was impacted by the conflict; more than 100 Pike County residents died. Morgan's Raiders passed through Waverly in 1863.

Many Pike County residents represented the area through service in both World War I and World War II. The need for workers in war industries during World War II gave area residents alternatives to working on the farm or saw mill.

After World War II large farming operations began to consolidate their holdings by buying up smaller family farms. Pike County had 1,700 farms in 1940 but a short 30 years later the number had dropped to 450.

In 1953, the Federal Government chose Pike County as the location for the Portsmouth Gaseous Diffusion Plant, designed to enrich uranium. The time around the construction of the facility is still referred to as the "Boom", as literally hundreds of new people flooded the county to construct, and later work, at the facility. During this time, government housing projects were undertaken, school facilities were expanded and improved, and many new businesses were started in Pike County. The plant covered nearly 4,000 acres and provided employment for over 2,000 workers at its height of operation.

=== Racial segregation in Waverly ===
Throughout the 19th century, Waverly was a sundown town, where African Americans were not allowed to live. In an 1884 history of the area, an anonymous author wrote that "Waverly's not having a single colored resident is a rare mark of distinction for a town of its size" and that Waverly had never had "a Negro or mulatto resident". Historian James W. Loewen cites Waverly as a rare example of a town that barred blacks as early as the Civil War, and asserts that the community was one of a number of Midwestern cities created for the purpose of excluding all races but whites. The Ku Klux Klan had a presence in Waverly dating back to a record of a raid in 1885.

The area known as East Jackson, about seven miles (11 km) east of Waverly on Ohio State Route 335, developed a distinct racial history and culture because its residents were excluded from Waverly as "poor" or "negro". After several generations, many East Jackson residents identified as "Black" but appeared to be "white". Many residents also self-identify as being of Native American descent.

== Geography ==
According to the United States Census Bureau, the city has a total area of 4.26 square miles (11.03 km^{2}), of which 4.20 square miles (10.88 km^{2}) is land and 0.06 square miles (0.16 km^{2}) is water.

=== Climate ===
Climate data for Waverly, Ohio, 1991–2020 normals, extremes 1893–present
Month	Jan	Feb	Mar	Apr	May	Jun	Jul	Aug	Sep	Oct	Nov	Dec	Year
Record high °F (°C)	78 (26)	80 (27)	89 (32)	95 (35)	98 (37)	102 (39)	107 (42)	105 (41)	103 (39)	97 (36)	87 (31)	79 (26)	107 (42)
Mean maximum °F (°C)	64.3 (17.9)	67.4 (19.7)	75.7 (24.3)	83.8 (28.8)	88.3 (31.3)	92.5 (33.6)	94.5 (34.7)	94.0 (34.4)	91.1 (32.8)	83.8 (28.8)	74.4 (23.6)	65.5 (18.6)	95.7 (35.4)
Mean daily maximum °F (°C)	39.7 (4.3)	43.8 (6.6)	53.7 (12.1)	66.4 (19.1)	75.0 (23.9)	83.0 (28.3)	86.3 (30.2)	85.3 (29.6)	79.5 (26.4)	67.6 (19.8)	54.9 (12.7)	44.4 (6.9)	65.0 (18.3)
Daily mean °F (°C)	30.7 (−0.7)	33.9 (1.1)	42.4 (5.8)	53.7 (12.1)	63.5 (17.5)	72.1 (22.3)	75.5 (24.2)	73.9 (23.3)	67.1 (19.5)	55.1 (12.8)	43.5 (6.4)	35.6 (2.0)	53.9 (12.2)
Mean daily minimum °F (°C)	21.7 (−5.7)	23.9 (−4.5)	31.1 (−0.5)	41.0 (5.0)	52.0 (11.1)	61.2 (16.2)	64.7 (18.2)	62.5 (16.9)	54.7 (12.6)	42.5 (5.8)	32.1 (0.1)	26.8 (−2.9)	42.8 (6.0)
Mean minimum °F (°C)	0.5 (−17.5)	4.8 (−15.1)	13.7 (−10.2)	24.6 (−4.1)	34.6 (1.4)	46.6 (8.1)	52.7 (11.5)	50.4 (10.2)	39.6 (4.2)	27.8 (−2.3)	17.0 (−8.3)	9.2 (−12.7)	−2.8 (−19.3)
Record low °F (°C)	−31 (−35)	−29 (−34)	−12 (−24)	10 (−12)	22 (−6)	31 (−1)	35 (2)	29 (−2)	26 (−3)	14 (−10)	−10 (−23)	−26 (−32)	−31 (−35)
Average precipitation inches (mm)	3.20 (81)	3.13 (80)	4.25 (108)	4.10 (104)	4.43 (113)	4.37 (111)	4.20 (107)	3.49 (89)	2.95 (75)	3.15 (80)	2.90 (74)	3.39 (86)	43.56 (1,108)
Average snowfall inches (cm)	5.0 (13)	3.5 (8.9)	0.9 (2.3)	0.0 (0.0)	0.0 (0.0)	0.0 (0.0)	0.0 (0.0)	0.0 (0.0)	0.0 (0.0)	0.0 (0.0)	0.1 (0.25)	2.0 (5.1)	11.5 (29.55)
Average precipitation days (≥ 0.01 in)	9.4	8.5	10.1	10.5	10.9	9.5	8.8	7.5	6.4	8.0	7.9	9.6	107.1
Average snowy days (≥ 0.1 in)	3.2	2.5	0.6	0.0	0.0	0.0	0.0	0.0	0.0	0.0	0.2	1.5	8.0
Source 1: NOAA
Source 2: National Weather Service

== Demographics ==
Historical population
Census	Pop.	Note	%±
1840	306		—
1850	678		121.6%
1860	1,057		55.9%
1870	1,202		13.7%
1880	1,539		28.0%
1890	1,567		1.8%
1900	1,854		18.3%
1910	1,803		−2.8%
1920	1,625		−9.9%
1930	1,603		−1.4%
1940	1,757		9.6%
1950	1,679		−4.4%
1960	3,830		128.1%
1970	4,858		26.8%
1980	4,603		−5.2%
1990	4,477		−2.7%
2000	4,433		−1.0%
2010	4,408		−0.6%
2020	4,165		−5.5%
U.S. Decennial Census

=== 2010 census ===
As of the census of 2010, there were 4,408 people, 2,035 households, and 1,142 families residing in the city. The population density was 1,049.5 inhabitants per square mile (405.2/km^{2}). There were 2,290 housing units at an average density of 545.2 per square mile (210.5/km^{2}). The racial makeup of the city was 96.2% White, 1.0% African American, 0.3% Native American, 0.4% Asian, 0.4% from other races, and 1.6% from two or more races. Hispanic or Latino of any race were 0.8% of the population.

There were 2,035 households, of which 24.4% had children under the age of 18 living with them, 37.9% were married couples living together, 13.5% had a female householder with no husband present, 4.8% had a male householder with no wife present, and 43.9% were non-families. 40.2% of all households were made up of individuals, and 23.2% had someone living alone who was 65 years of age or older. The average household size was 2.10 and the average family size was 2.75.

The median age in the city was 48 years. 19.5% of residents were under the age of 18; 7.1% were between the ages of 18 and 24; 19% were from 25 to 44; 26.6% were from 45 to 64; and 27.8% were 65 years of age or older. The gender makeup of the city was 46.6% male and 53.4% female.

=== 2000 census ===
As of the census of 2000, there were 4,433 people, 2,028 households, and 1,237 families residing in the city. The population density was 1,131.3 inhabitants per square mile (436.8/km^{2}). There were 2,219 housing units at an average density of 566.3 per square mile (218.6/km^{2}). The racial makeup of the city was 96.75% White, 1.15% African American, 0.59% Native American, 0.54% Asian, 0.05% Pacific Islander, 0.02% from other races, and 0.90% from two or more races. Hispanic or Latino of any race were 0.38% of the population.

There were 2,028 households, out of which 23.8% had children under the age of 18 living with them, 46.4% were married couples living together, 11.4% had a female householder with no husband present, and 39.0% were non-families. 35.9% of all households were made up of individuals, and 22.7% had someone living alone who was 65 years of age or older. The average household size was 2.15 and the average family size was 2.76.

In the city, the population was spread out, with 20.7% under the age of 18, 7.3% from 18 to 24, 24.0% from 25 to 44, 18.2% from 45 to 64, and 29.8% who were 65 years of age or older. The median age was 43 years. For every 100 females, there were 80.4 males. For every 100 females age 18 and over, there were 75.8 males.

The median income for a household in the city was $33,895, and the median income for a family was $41,346. Males had a median income of $38,045 versus $20,972 for females. The per capita income for the city was $18,554. About 9.1% of families and 12.2% of the population were below the poverty line, including 13.9% of those under the age of 18 and 9.1% ages 65 or older.

== Education ==
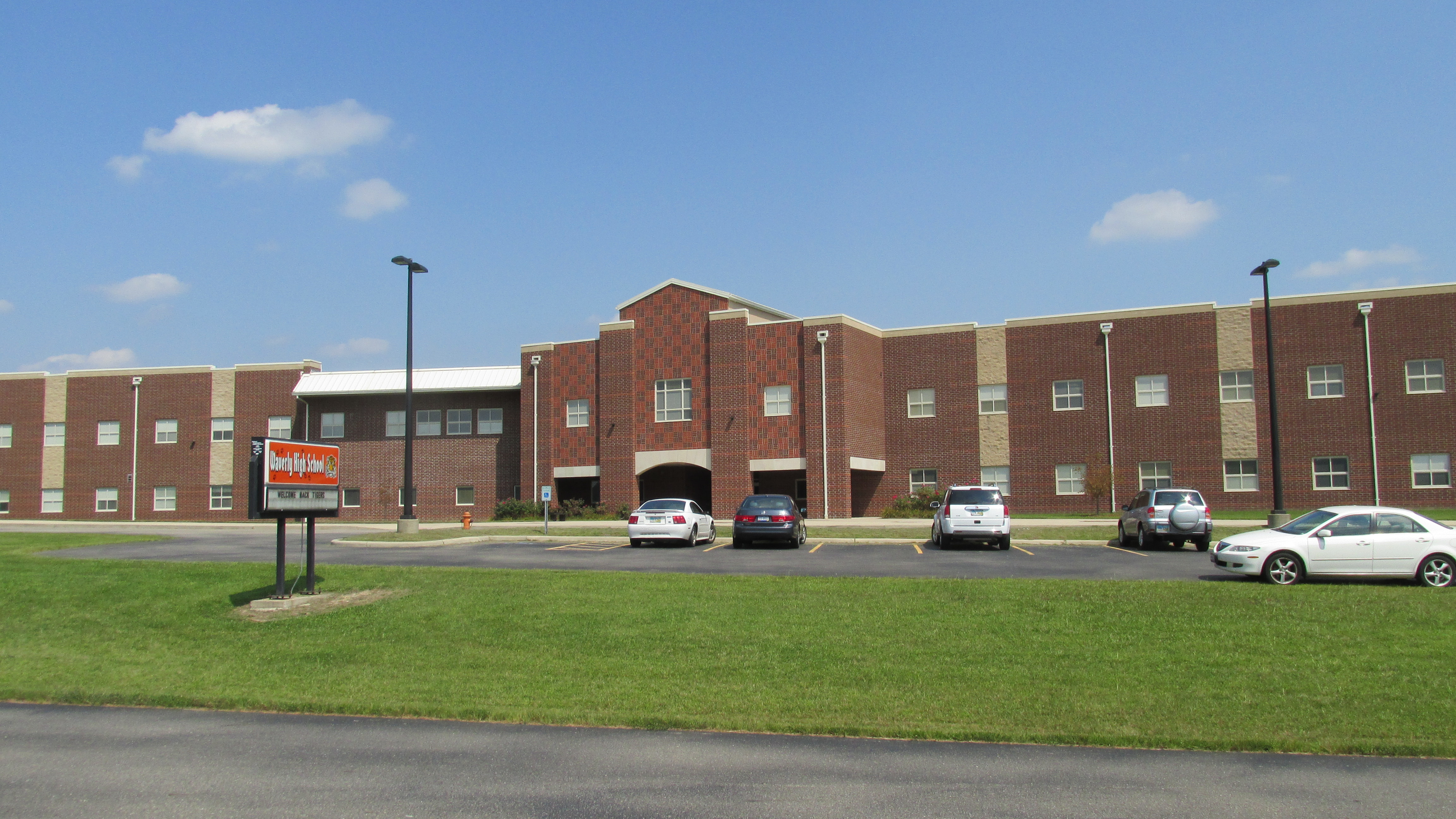
Waverly High School

Waverly City School District operates Waverly Primary School, Waverly Intermediate School, Waverly Junior High School, and Waverly High School.

Waverly has a public library, a branch of the Garnet A. Wilson Public Library of Pike County.

== Notable people ==
Waverly is the hometown of the Pure Prairie League, a pioneering band of the country rock genre.

== See also ==
- List of sundown towns in the United States
