= National Register of Historic Places listings in Morgan County, Ohio =

Location of Morgan County in Ohio

This is a list of the National Register of Historic Places listings in Morgan County, Ohio.

It is intended to be a complete list of the properties and districts on the National Register of Historic Places in Morgan County, Ohio, United States. The locations of National Register properties and districts for which the latitude and longitude coordinates are included below, may be seen in a Google map.

There are 6 properties and districts listed on the National Register in the county. Another property was once listed but has been removed.

This National Park Service list is complete through NPS recent listings posted March 14, 2025.

== Current listings ==
	Name on the Register	Image	Date listed	Location	City or town	Description
1	Adams Covered Bridge	Adams Covered Bridge	February 5, 1999 (#99000093)	San Toy Rd., west of Malta; 39°37′28″N 82°01′56″W	Union Township	
2	Barkhurst Mill Covered Bridge	Barkhurst Mill Covered Bridge	February 5, 1999 (#99000097)	Township Road 21 over Wolf Creek, northeast of Chesterhill; 39°30′10″N 81°50′03″W	Marion Township	
3	Big Bottom Massacre Site	Big Bottom Massacre Site	November 10, 1970 (#70000512)	1 mile southeast of Stockport on State Route 266; 39°31′58″N 81°46′26″W	Windsor Township	
4	Helmick Mill Covered Bridge	Helmick Mill Covered Bridge	February 5, 1999 (#99000098)	Township Road 269 over Island Run, northwest of Malta; 39°43′11″N 81°56′32″W	Deerfield Township	
5	McConnelsville Historic District	McConnelsville Historic District	June 14, 1979 (#79001906)	State Routes 78 and State Route 376; 39°38′57″N 81°51′09″W	McConnelsville	
6	Muskingum River Navigation Historic District	Muskingum River Navigation Historic District	February 9, 2007 (#07000025)	Coshocton, Muskingum, Morgan, Washington Counties; 39°38′35″N 81°50′47″W	Numerous jurisdictions	

== Former listing ==
	Name on the Register	Image	Date listed	Date removed	Location	City or town	Description
1	Rock Hollow School		January 11, 1983 (#83002014)	January 31, 1995	South of Ringgold on State Route 78; 39°33′43″N 81°58′52″W	Ringgold	

== See also ==
- List of National Historic Landmarks in Ohio
- Listings in neighboring counties: Athens, Muskingum, Noble, Perry, Washington
- National Register of Historic Places listings in Ohio
