= Joy, Ohio =

- Unincorporated community
- Location within Ohio Location within the United States
- Coordinates: 39°28′13″N 81°56′28″W
- Country: United States
- State: Ohio
- County: Morgan
- Townships: Homer, Marion
- Elevation: 696 ft (212 m)
- Time zone: UTC-5 (Eastern (EST))
  - Summer (DST): UTC-4 (EDT)
- ZIP Code: 43728 (Chesterhill)
- GNIS feature ID: 1076156

Joy is an unincorporated community in Morgan County, Ohio, United States. Sharps Fork Creek flows west of Joy.

The community is named for the Joy family, who were early settlers. Joy had a post office, and was described in 1886 as "a hamlet of half a dozen houses". Joy is also known as "Winfred". The post office was discontinued in 1924.

Joy Cemetery is located north of the community.
