= Sharpsburg, Athens County, Ohio =

Unincorporated community in Ohio, U.S.

Coordinates: 39°26′09″N 81°54′42″W

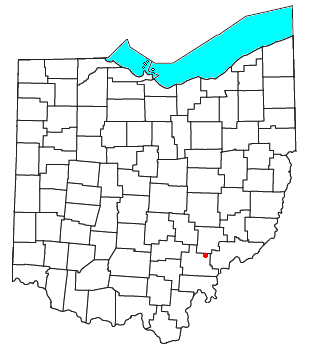
Location of Sharpsburg, Ohio

Sharpsburg is an unincorporated community in northwestern Bern Township, Athens County, Ohio, United States. There is a convenience store there, with gas pumps, and also containing the post office with the ZIP code 45777. Additionally there is a church, the Bern Township office, and a few houses.

Sharpsburg is located on Sharps Run, a tributary of Federal Creek, which in turn is a tributary of the Hocking River. The main road of the community is Joy Road, at its junction with Ohio State Route 550 and Ohio State Route 377. The Gifford State Forest is located just to the north of Sharpsburg.
