= Bern Township =

Bern Township may refer to the following townships in the United States:

- Bern Township, Ohio
- Bern Township, Pennsylvania

== See also ==
- Upper Bern Township, Pennsylvania
