= Manchester Township, Morgan County, Ohio =

Township in Ohio, US

- Township
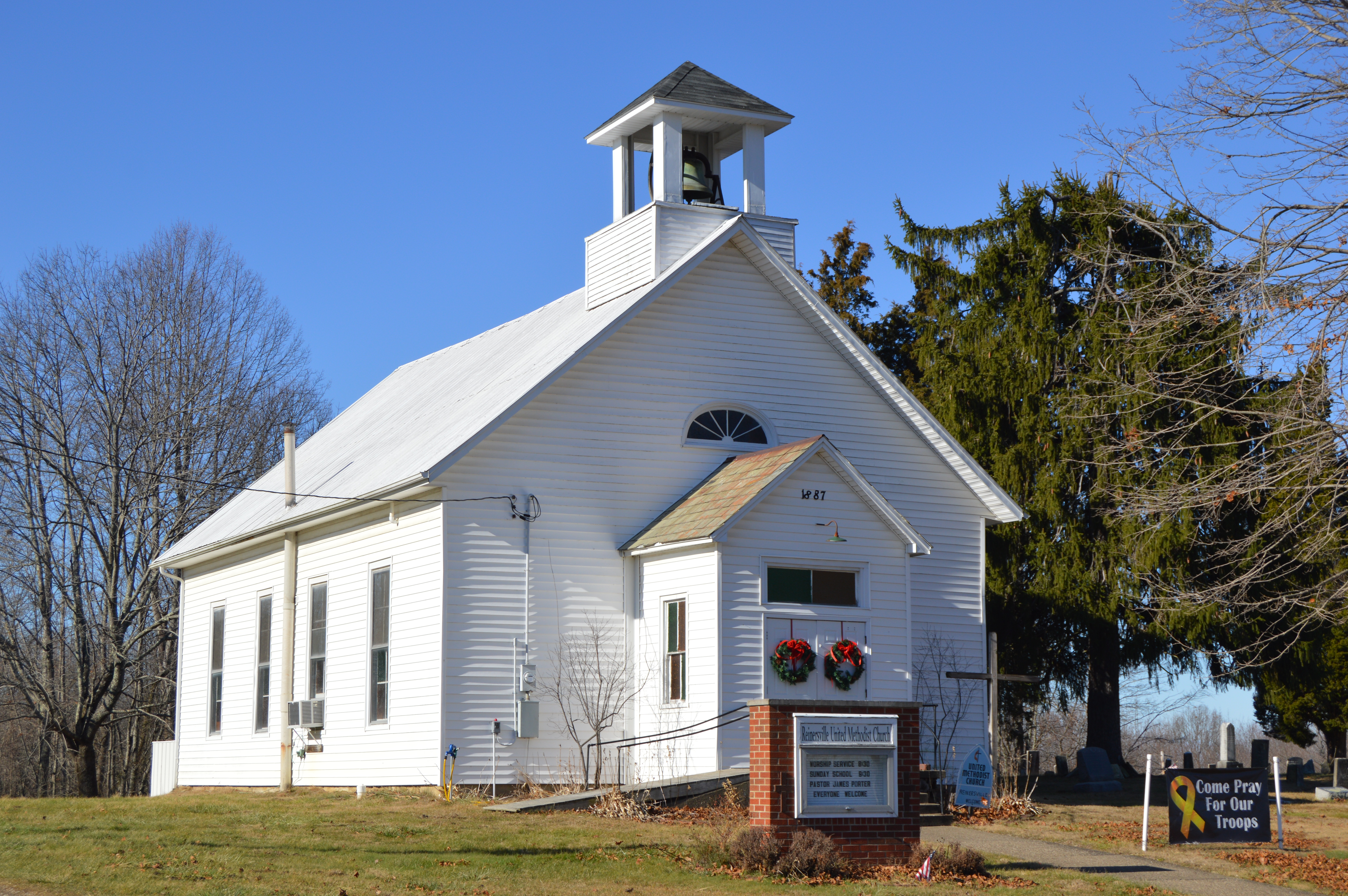
- Methodist church at Reinersville

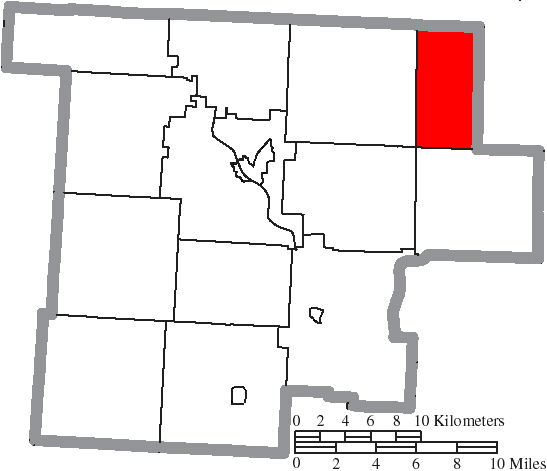
- Location of Manchester Township in Morgan County
- Coordinates: 39°42′39″N 81°40′44″W
- Country: United States
- State: Ohio
- County: Morgan

Area
  - Total: 18.6 sq mi (48.1 km^{2})
  - Land: 18.3 sq mi (47.4 km^{2})
  - Water: 0.31 sq mi (0.8 km^{2})
- Elevation: 981 ft (299 m)

Population (2020)
  - Total: 117
  - Density: 6.39/sq mi (2.47/km^{2})
- Time zone: UTC-5 (Eastern (EST))
  - Summer (DST): UTC-4 (EDT)
- FIPS code: 39-47040
- GNIS feature ID: 1086689

Manchester Township is one of the fourteen townships of Morgan County, Ohio, United States. The 2020 census found 117 people in the township.

== Geography ==
Located in the northeastern corner of the county, it borders the following townships:

- Brookfield Township, Noble County - north
- Sharon Township, Noble County - east
- Center Township - south
- Meigsville Township - southwest corner
- Bristol Township - west
- Meigs Township, Muskingum County - northwest corner

No municipalities are located in Manchester Township.

== Name and history ==
Statewide, the only other Manchester Township is located in Adams County.

== Government ==
The township is governed by a three-member board of trustees, who are elected in November of odd-numbered years to a four-year term beginning on the following January 1. Two are elected in the year after the presidential election and one is elected in the year before it. There is also an elected township fiscal officer, who serves a four-year term beginning on April 1 of the year after the election, which is held in November of the year before the presidential election. Vacancies in the fiscal officership or on the board of trustees are filled by the remaining trustees.
