= Bloom Township, Morgan County, Ohio =

Township in Ohio, US

- Township
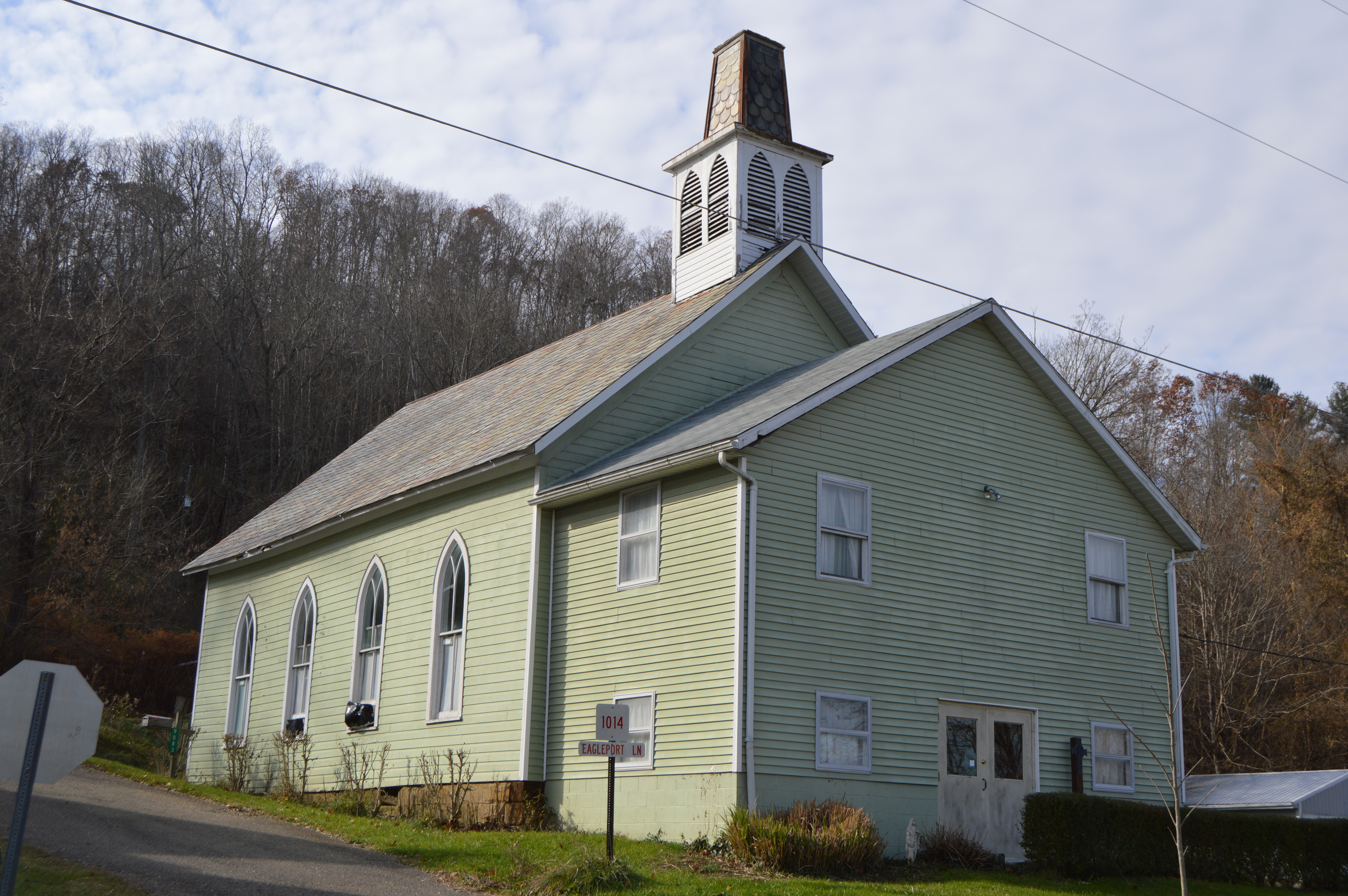
- Episcopal church at Eagleport

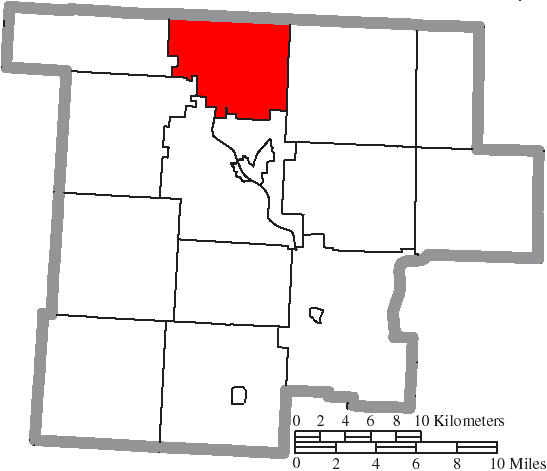
- Location of Bloom Township in Morgan County
- Coordinates: 39°43′53″N 81°53′12″W
- Country: United States
- State: Ohio
- County: Morgan

Area
  - Total: 25.6 sq mi (66.3 km^{2})
  - Land: 25.2 sq mi (65.2 km^{2})
  - Water: 0.46 sq mi (1.2 km^{2})
- Elevation: 869 ft (265 m)

Population (2020)
  - Total: 962
  - Density: 38.2/sq mi (14.8/km^{2})
- Time zone: UTC-5 (Eastern (EST))
  - Summer (DST): UTC-4 (EDT)
- FIPS code: 39-06964
- GNIS feature ID: 1086683

Bloom Township is one of the fourteen townships of Morgan County, Ohio, United States. The 2020 census found 962 people in the township.

== Geography ==
Located in the northern part of the county, it borders the following townships:

- Blue Rock Township, Muskingum County - north
- Meigs Township, Muskingum County - northeast corner
- Bristol Township - east
- Morgan Township - south
- Malta Township - southwest, east of Deerfield Township
- Deerfield Township - southwest, west of Malta Township
- York Township - west
- Harrison Township, Muskingum County - northwest

No municipalities are located in Bloom Township.

== Name and history ==
Statewide, other Bloom Townships are located in Fairfield, Scioto, Seneca, and Wood counties.

== Government ==
The township is governed by a three-member board of trustees, who are elected in November of odd-numbered years to a four-year term beginning on the following January 1. Two are elected in the year after the presidential election and one is elected in the year before it. There is also an elected township fiscal officer, who serves a four-year term beginning on April 1 of the year after the election, which is held in November of the year before the presidential election. Vacancies in the fiscal officership or on the board of trustees are filled by the remaining trustees.
