= Bishopville, Ohio =

- Unincorporated community
- Location within Ohio Location within the United States
- Coordinates: 39°30′47″N 82°02′57″W
- Country: United States
- State: Ohio
- Counties: Morgan, Athens
- Townships: Homer, Trimble
- Elevation: 824 ft (251 m)
- Time zone: UTC-5 (Eastern (EST))
  - Summer (DST): UTC-4 (EDT)
- ZIP Code: 45732 (Glouster)
- Area code: 740
- GNIS feature ID: 1075388

Bishopville is an unincorporated community in Morgan County and Athens County, Ohio, United States. Bishopville is located on Ohio State Route 78, 2 miles (3 km) east of Glouster. The community is nestled on the south side of Burr Oak State Park, offering a public dock.

== History ==
Bishopville was laid out in 1859 by James M. Bishop, and named for him. A post office was established at Bishopville in 1860, and remained in operation until 1929.
