= Malta Township =

Malta Township may refer to the following townships in the United States:

- Malta Township, DeKalb County, Illinois
- Malta Township, Big Stone County, Minnesota
- Malta Township, Morgan County, Ohio
