= Bristol Township, Ohio =

Bristol Township, Ohio, may refer to:

- Bristol Township, Morgan County, Ohio
- Bristol Township, Trumbull County, Ohio
