= Plantsville =

Plantsville may refer to:

- Plantsville, Connecticut
- Plantsville, Ohio
