= Unionville, Morgan County, Ohio =

Unionville, Ohio
- Unincorporated community
- Location within Ohio Location within the United States
- Coordinates: 39°37′43″N 81°43′26″W
- Country: United States
- State: Ohio
- County: Morgan
- Township: Meigsville
- Elevation: 659 ft (201 m)
- Time zone: UTC-5 (Eastern (EST))
  - Summer (DST): UTC-4 (EDT)
- ZIP Code: 43756 (McConnelsville)
- Area code: 740
- GNIS feature ID: 1065410

Unionville is an unincorporated community in Morgan County, Ohio, United States. Unionville is 7 miles (11 km) east of McConnelsville.
