= Triadelphia =

Triadelphia may refer to:

- Triadelphia, Ohio, an unincorporated community
- Triadelphia, West Virginia
- Triadelphia Reservoir - Maryland
- Triadelphia Middle School
