= Neelysville, Ohio =

Unincorporated community in Ohio, U.S.

Coordinates: 39°37′37″N 81°46′39″W

Neelysville is an unincorporated community in Morgan County, in the U.S. state of Ohio.

== History ==
The community was founded by Robert Neeley, and named for him. A post office called Neelysville was established in 1850, and remained in operation until 1907.
