= Homer Township, Ohio =

Homer Township, Ohio, may refer to:

- Homer Township, Medina County, Ohio
- Homer Township, Morgan County, Ohio
