= Rosseau, Ohio =

Unincorporated community in Ohio, U.S.

Coordinates: 39°34′25″N 81°56′49″W

Rosseau is an unincorporated community in Morgan County, in the U.S. state of Ohio.

== History ==
Rosseau was laid out around 1836. A post office was established at Rosseau in 1837, and remained in operation until 1911.
