= Hooksburg, Ohio =

Unincorporated community in Ohio, U.S.

Coordinates: 39°35′01″N 81°47′01″W

Hooksburg is an unincorporated community in Morgan County, in the U.S. state of Ohio.

== History ==
A post office called Hooksburg was established in 1872, and remained in operation until 1914. The community was named for Captain Isaac N. Hook, the original owner of the town site.
