= Union Township, Morgan County, Ohio =

Township in Ohio, US

- Township
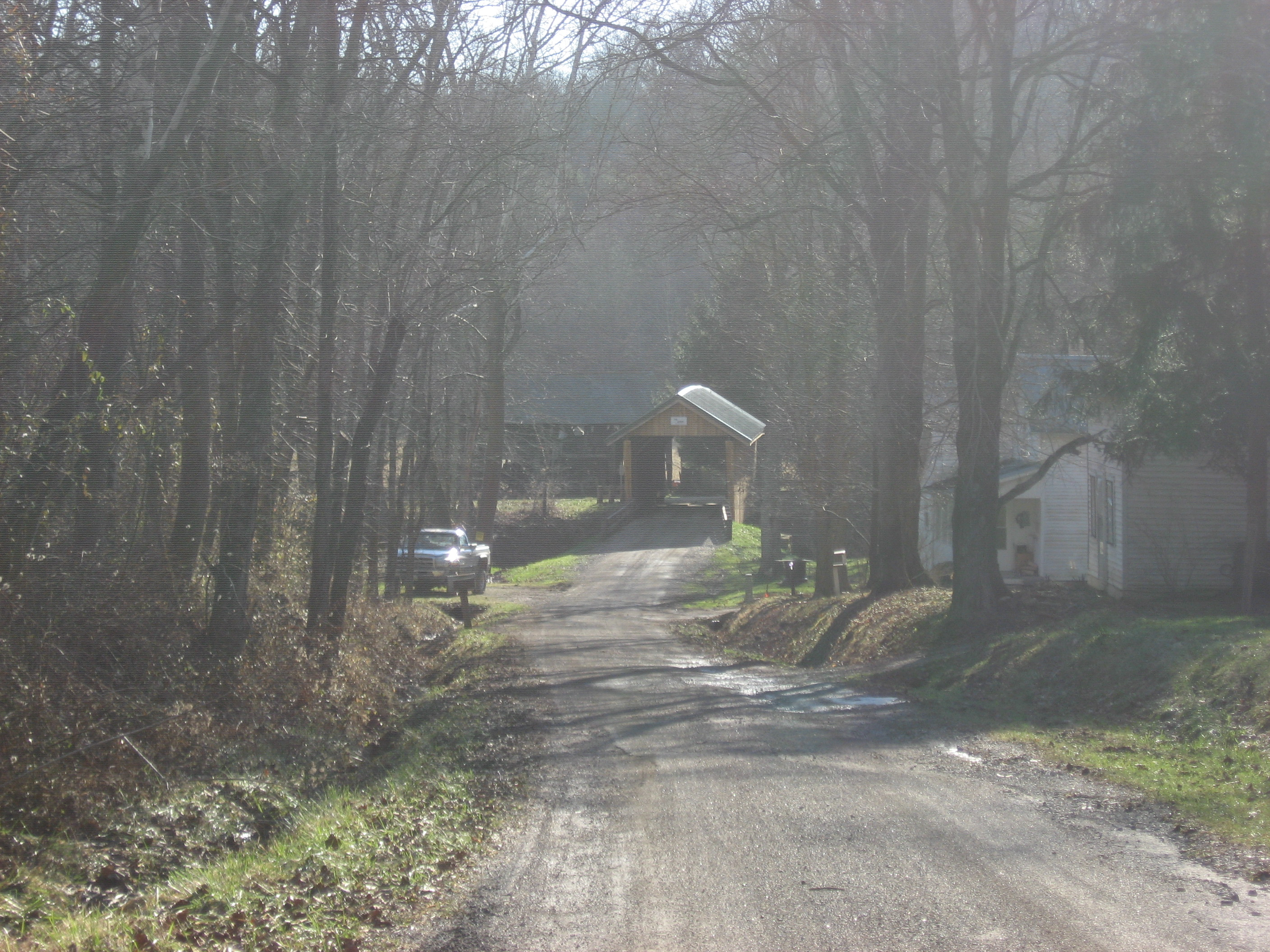
- Distant view of the Adams Covered Bridge

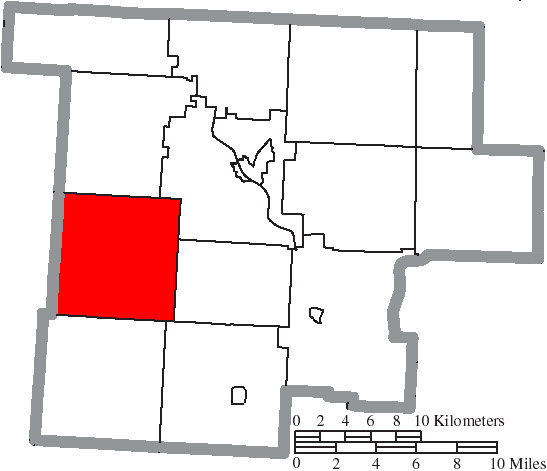
- Location of Union Township in Morgan County
- Coordinates: 39°35′36″N 81°58′26″W
- Country: United States
- State: Ohio
- County: Morgan

Area
  - Total: 36.7 sq mi (95.0 km^{2})
  - Land: 36.5 sq mi (94.5 km^{2})
  - Water: 0.23 sq mi (0.6 km^{2})
- Elevation: 902 ft (275 m)

Population (2020)
  - Total: 638
  - Density: 17.5/sq mi (6.75/km^{2})
- Time zone: UTC-5 (Eastern (EST))
  - Summer (DST): UTC-4 (EDT)
- FIPS code: 39-78484
- GNIS feature ID: 1086694

Union Township is one of the fourteen townships of Morgan County, Ohio, United States. The 2020 census counted 638 people in the township.

== Geography ==
Located in the western part of the county, it borders the following townships:

- Deerfield Township - north
- Malta Township - northeast
- Penn Township - east
- Marion Township - southeast
- Homer Township - south
- Monroe Township, Perry County - west
- Bearfield Township, Perry County - northwest

No municipalities are located in Union Township.

== Name and history ==
It is one of twenty-seven Union Townships statewide.

== Government ==
The township is governed by a three-member board of trustees, who are elected in November of odd-numbered years to a four-year term beginning on the following January 1. Two are elected in the year after the presidential election and one is elected in the year before it. There is also an elected township fiscal officer, who serves a four-year term beginning on April 1 of the year after the election, which is held in November of the year before the presidential election. Vacancies in the fiscal officership or on the board of trustees are filled by the remaining trustees.
