= Roxbury, Ohio =

Unincorporated community in Ohio, U.S.

Coordinates: 39°31′22″N 81°44′53″W

Roxbury is an unincorporated community in Morgan County, in the U.S. state of Ohio.

== History ==
Roxbury was laid out in 1843. A post office called Roxbury was established in 1855, and remained in operation until 1938.
