= Ames Township, Ohio =

Township in Ohio, US

Ames Township, Athens County, Ohio
- Township
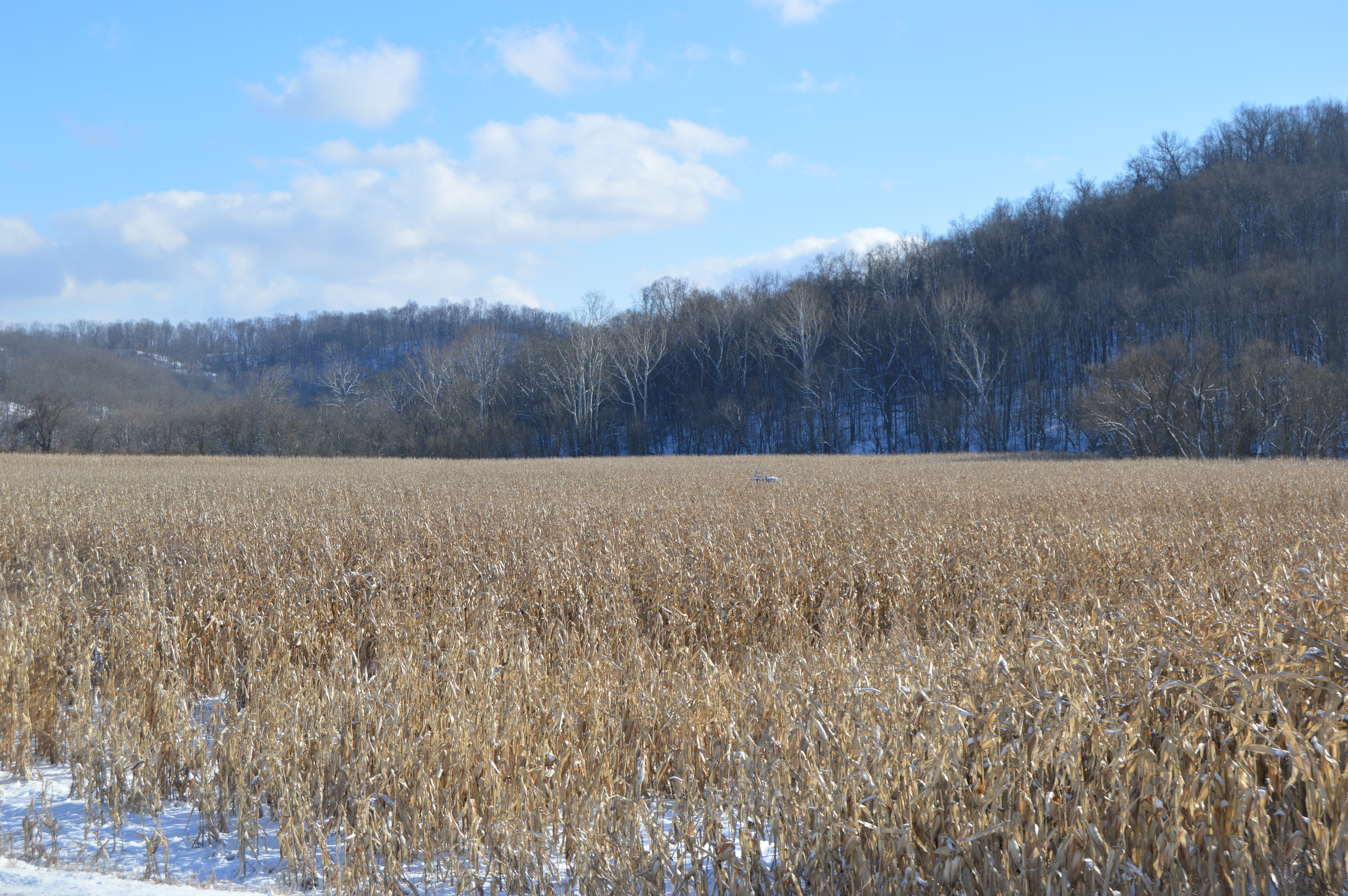
- Along State Route 550 west of Amesville

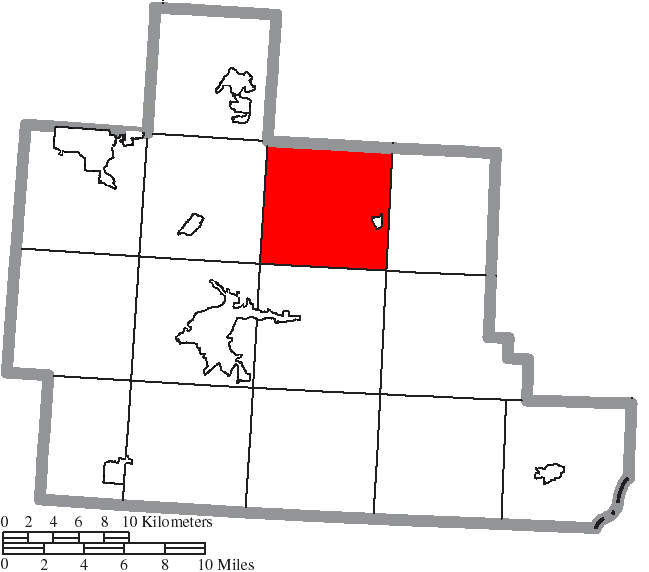
- Location of Ames Township in Athens County
- Coordinates: 39°24′25″N 81°58′32″W
- Country: United States
- State: Ohio
- County: Athens

Area
  - Total: 37.9 sq mi (98.2 km^{2})
  - Land: 37.7 sq mi (97.7 km^{2})
  - Water: 0.15 sq mi (0.4 km^{2})
- Elevation: 646 ft (197 m)

Population (2020)
  - Total: 1,237
  - Density: 31/sq mi (12.1/km^{2})
- Time zone: UTC-5 (Eastern (EST))
  - Summer (DST): UTC-4 (EDT)
- FIPS code: 39-01770
- GNIS feature ID: 1085749
- Website: sites.google.com/site/amestownship/

Ames Township is one of the fourteen townships of Athens County, Ohio, United States. The 2020 census found 1,237 people in the township.

== Geography ==
Located in the northern part of the county, it borders the following townships:

- Homer Township, Morgan County - north
- Marion Township, Morgan County - northeast corner
- Bern Township - east
- Rome Township - southeast corner
- Canaan Township - south
- Athens Township - southwest corner
- Dover Township - west
- Trimble Township - northwest corner

The village of Amesville is located in eastern Ames Township.

== Name and history ==
Ames Township was organized in 1802.

It is the only Ames Township statewide.

== Government ==
The township is governed by a three-member board of trustees, who are elected in November of odd-numbered years to a four-year term beginning on the following January 1. Two are elected in the year after the presidential election and one is elected in the year before it. There is also an elected township fiscal officer, who serves a four-year term beginning on April 1 of the year after the election, which is held in November of the year before the presidential election. Vacancies in the fiscal officership or on the board of trustees are filled by the remaining trustees.
