= Meigsville Township, Morgan County, Ohio =

Township in Ohio, US

- Township
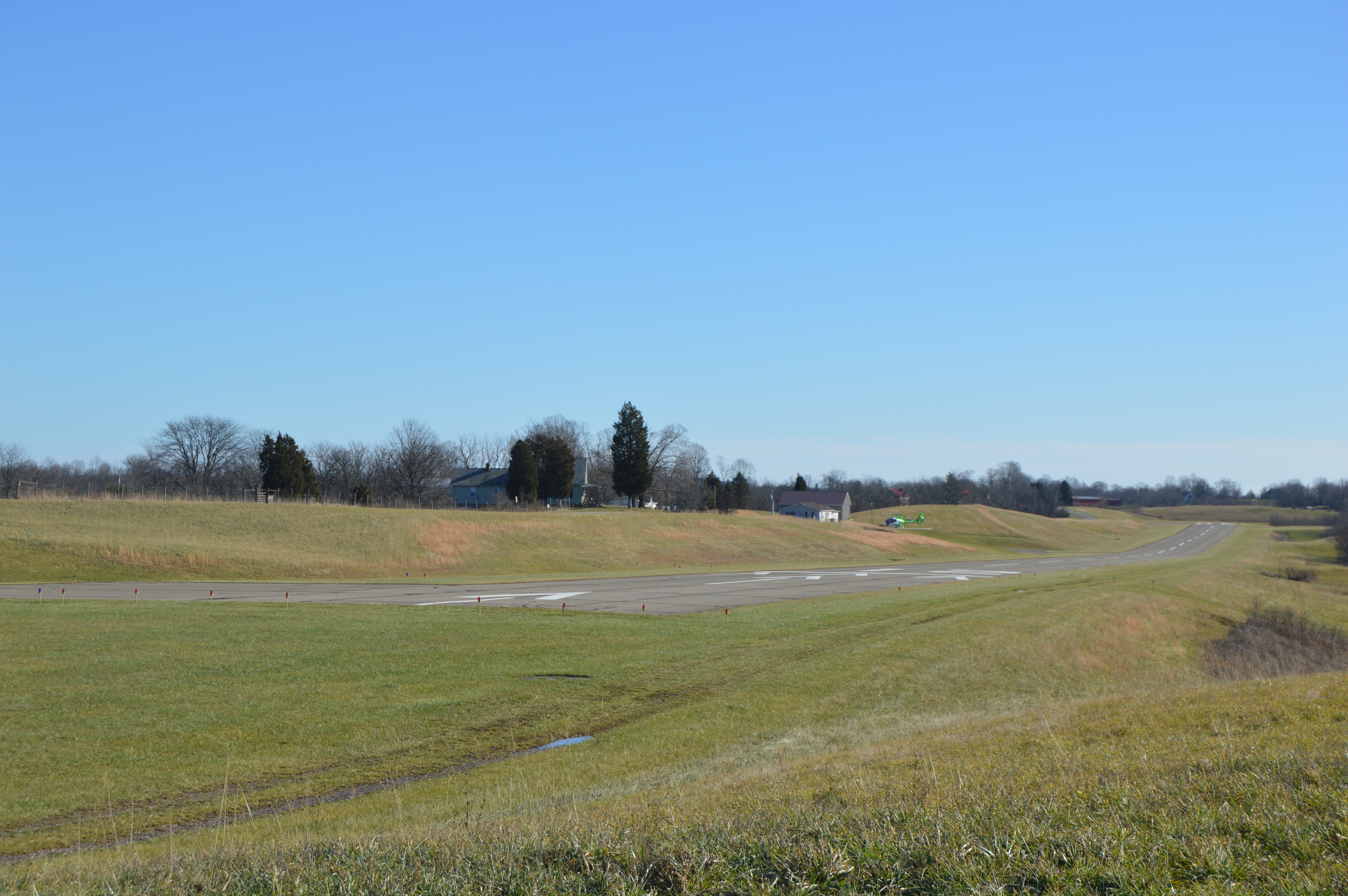
- Morgan County Airport

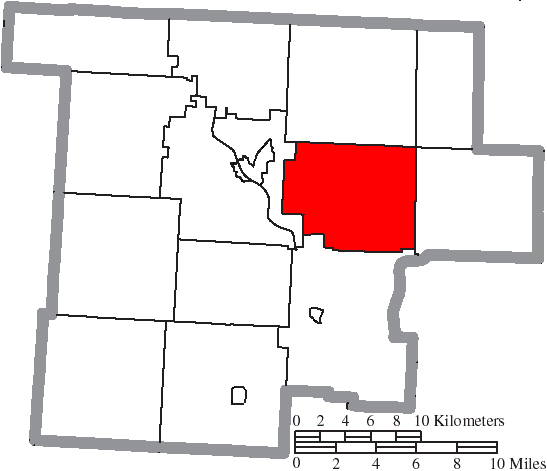
- Location of Meigsville Township in Morgan County
- Coordinates: 39°38′1″N 81°44′47″W
- Country: United States
- State: Ohio
- County: Morgan

Area
  - Total: 31.4 sq mi (81.2 km^{2})
  - Land: 31.3 sq mi (81.0 km^{2})
  - Water: 0.077 sq mi (0.2 km^{2})
- Elevation: 774 ft (236 m)

Population (2020)
  - Total: 921
  - Density: 29.4/sq mi (11.4/km^{2})
- Time zone: UTC-5 (Eastern (EST))
  - Summer (DST): UTC-4 (EDT)
- FIPS code: 39-48930
- GNIS feature ID: 1086691

Meigsville Township is one of the fourteen townships of Morgan County, Ohio, United States. The 2020 census found 921 people in the township.

== Geography ==
Located in the eastern part of the county, it borders the following townships:

- Bristol Township - north
- Manchester Township - northeast corner
- Center Township - east
- Windsor Township - south
- Morgan Township - west

No municipalities are located in Meigsville Township.

== Name and history ==
It is the only Meigsville Township statewide.

== Government ==
The township is governed by a three-member board of trustees, who are elected in November of odd-numbered years to a four-year term beginning on the following January 1. Two are elected in the year after the presidential election and one is elected in the year before it. There is also an elected township fiscal officer, who serves a four-year term beginning on April 1 of the year after the election, which is held in November of the year before the presidential election. Vacancies in the fiscal officership or on the board of trustees are filled by the remaining trustees.
