= Moscow Mills, Ohio =

Unincorporated community in Ohio, U.S.

Coordinates: 39°36′10″N 81°37′32″W

Moscow Mills is a former town in Morgan County, in the U.S. state of Ohio. The GNIS classifies it as a populated place.

== History ==
A post office called Moscow Mills was established in 1837, and remained in operation until 1907. In 1886, Moscow Mills was one of three post offices within Center Township.
