= Wesley Township, Washington County, Ohio =

Township in Ohio, US

- Township
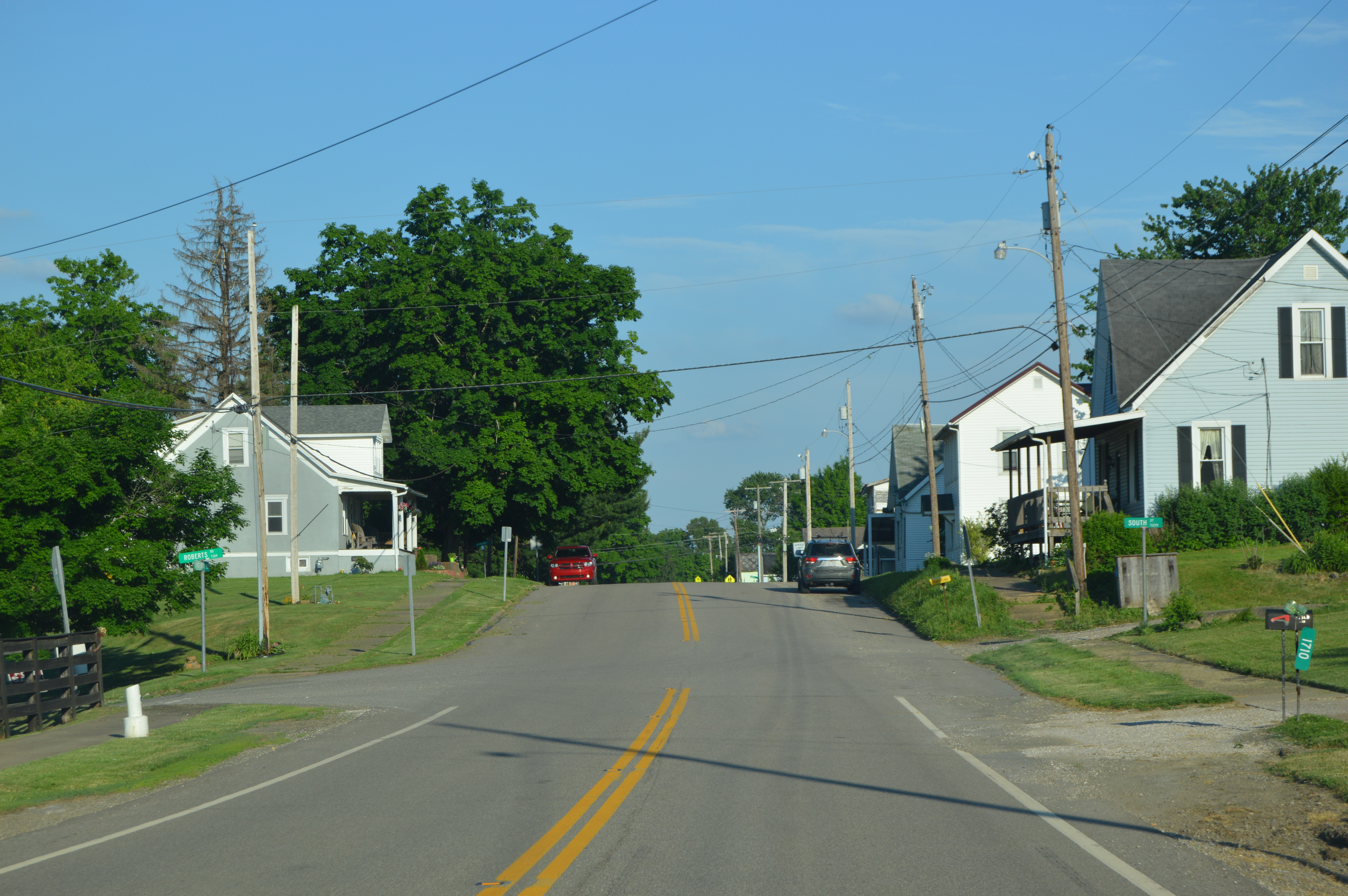
- State Route 550 in Bartlett

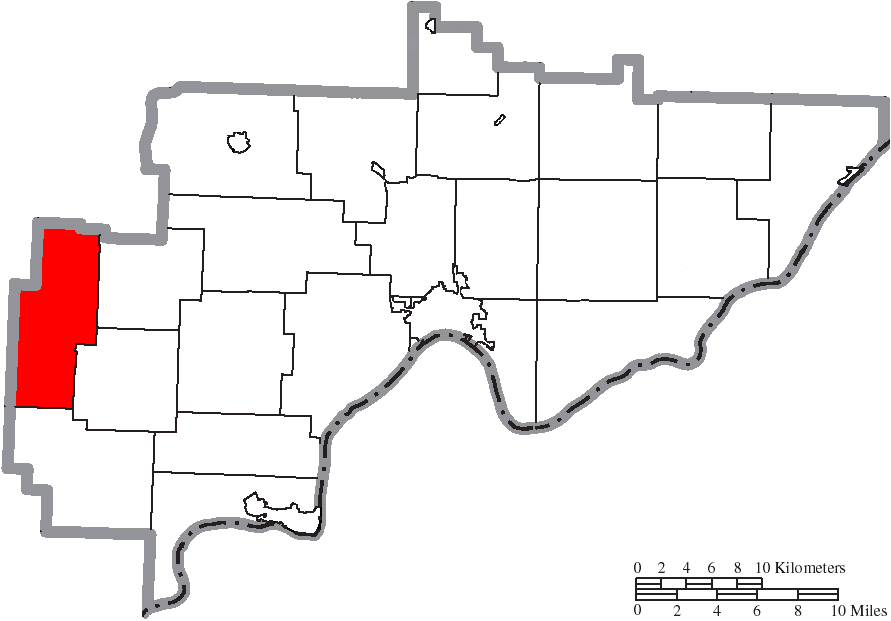
- Location of Wesley Township in Washington County
- Coordinates: 39°26′51″N 81°48′9″W
- Country: United States
- State: Ohio
- County: Washington

Area
  - Total: 31.2 sq mi (80.8 km^{2})
  - Land: 31.2 sq mi (80.8 km^{2})
  - Water: 0 sq mi (0.0 km^{2})
- Elevation: 797 ft (243 m)

Population (2020)
  - Total: 952
  - Density: 30.5/sq mi (11.8/km^{2})
- Time zone: UTC-5 (Eastern (EST))
  - Summer (DST): UTC-4 (EDT)
- FIPS code: 39-82838
- GNIS feature ID: 1087147

Wesley Township is one of the twenty-two townships of Washington County, Ohio, United States. The 2020 census found 952 people in the township.

== Geography ==
Located in the far western part of the county, it borders the following townships:

- Windsor Township, Morgan County - north
- Palmer Township - northeast
- Fairfield Township - southeast
- Decatur Township - south
- Rome Township, Athens County - southwest corner
- Bern Township, Athens County - west
- Marion Township, Morgan County - northwest

No municipalities are located in Wesley Township, although the unincorporated community of Bartlett lies in the township's center.

== Name and history ==
It is the only Wesley Township statewide.

== Government ==
The township is governed by a three-member board of trustees, who are elected in November of odd-numbered years to a four-year term beginning on the following January 1. Two are elected in the year after the presidential election and one is elected in the year before it. There is also an elected township fiscal officer, who serves a four-year term beginning on April 1 of the year after the election, which is held in November of the year before the presidential election. Vacancies in the fiscal officership or on the board of trustees are filled by the remaining trustees.
