= Bristol, Morgan County, Ohio =

Populated place in Ohio, U.S.

Coordinates: 39°41′52″N 81°43′52″W

Bristol is a former town in Morgan County, in the U.S. state of Ohio. The GNIS classifies it as a populated place.

== History ==
Bristol was platted in 1831, and named for its location within Bristol Township. A post office called Bristol was established in 1834, and remained in operation until 1915.
