= Morganville, Ohio =

Unincorporated community in Ohio, U.S.

Coordinates: 39°37′56″N 81°57′17″W

Morganville is an unincorporated community in Morgan County, in the U.S. state of Ohio.

== History ==
Morganville was laid out in 1833. A post office called Morgansville was established in 1844, and remained in operation until 1908.
