= Center Township, Morgan County, Ohio =

Township in Ohio, US

- Township
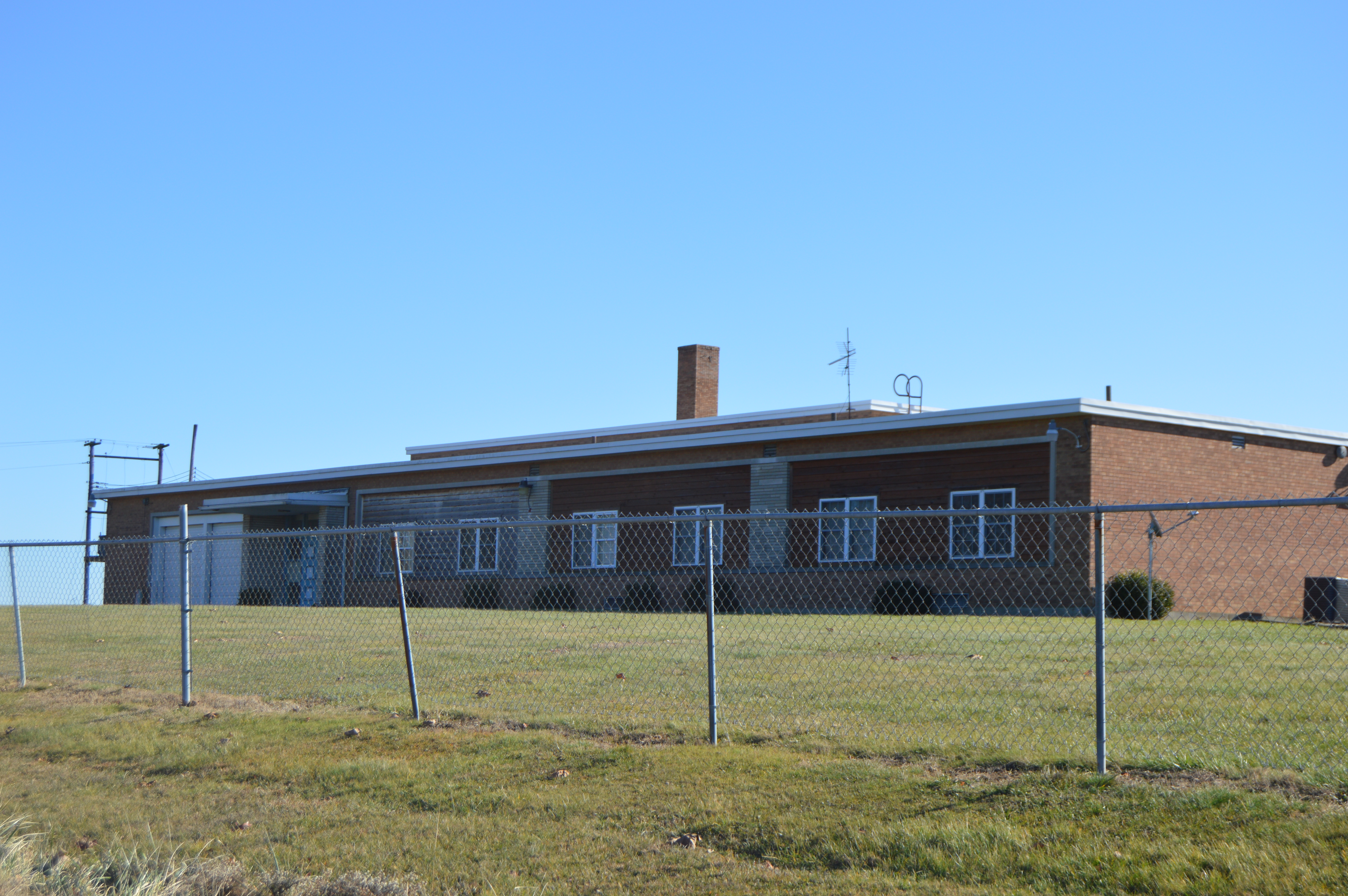
- Former township school at Hackney

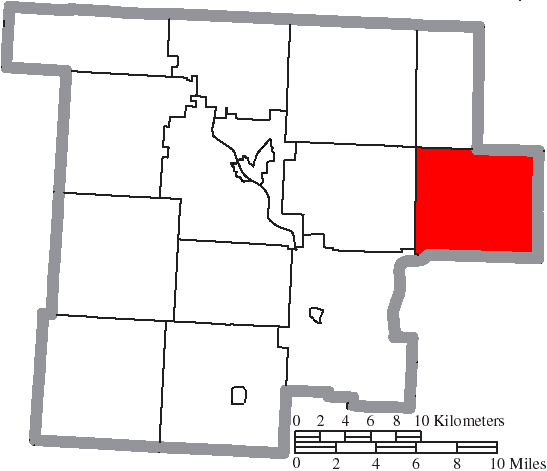
- Location of Center Township in Morgan County
- Coordinates: 39°37′49″N 81°38′49″W
- Country: United States
- State: Ohio
- County: Morgan

Area
  - Total: 32.3 sq mi (83.7 km^{2})
  - Land: 32.2 sq mi (83.5 km^{2})
  - Water: 0.077 sq mi (0.2 km^{2})
- Elevation: 709 ft (216 m)

Population (2020)
  - Total: 677
  - Density: 21.0/sq mi (8.11/km^{2})
- Time zone: UTC-5 (Eastern (EST))
  - Summer (DST): UTC-4 (EDT)
- FIPS code: 39-12980
- GNIS feature ID: 1086685

Center Township is one of the fourteen townships of Morgan County, Ohio, United States. The 2020 census found 677 people in the township.

== Geography ==
Located in the eastern part of the county, it borders the following townships:

- Manchester Township - north
- Sharon Township, Noble County - northeast
- Jackson Township, Noble County - east
- Adams Township, Washington County - southeast corner
- Waterford Township, Washington County - south
- Windsor Township - southwest
- Meigsville Township - west
- Bristol Township - northwest corner

Despite its name, Center Township is not in the center of Morgan County; it is located farther east than any other township in the county.

The unincorporated settlement of Hackney is located in the center of Center Township.

== Name and history ==
It is one of nine Center Townships statewide.

== Government ==
The township is governed by a three-member board of trustees, who are elected in November of odd-numbered years to a four-year term beginning on the following January 1. Two are elected in the year after the presidential election and one is elected in the year before it. There is also an elected township fiscal officer, who serves a four-year term beginning on April 1 of the year after the election, which is held in November of the year before the presidential election. Vacancies in the fiscal officership or on the board of trustees are filled by the remaining trustees.
