= Todds, Ohio =

Unincorporated community in Ohio, U.S.

Coordinates: 39°31′29″N 81°50′48″W

Todds is an unincorporated community in Morgan County, in the U.S. state of Ohio.

== History ==
A post office called Todds was established in 1855, and remained in operation until 1908. In 1886, Todds was one of five post offices within Marion Township.
