= Rokeby Lock, Ohio =

Unincorporated community in Ohio, U.S.

Coordinates: 39°43′55″N 81°54′18″W

Rokeby Lock (also known as Rokeby) is an unincorporated community in Morgan County, in the U.S. state of Ohio.

== History ==
Rokeby Lock was platted when a nearby lock and dam was being built on the Muskingum River. A post office was established at Rokeby Lock in 1839, and remained in operation until 1915.
