= Sharon Township, Noble County, Ohio =

Township in Ohio, US

- Township
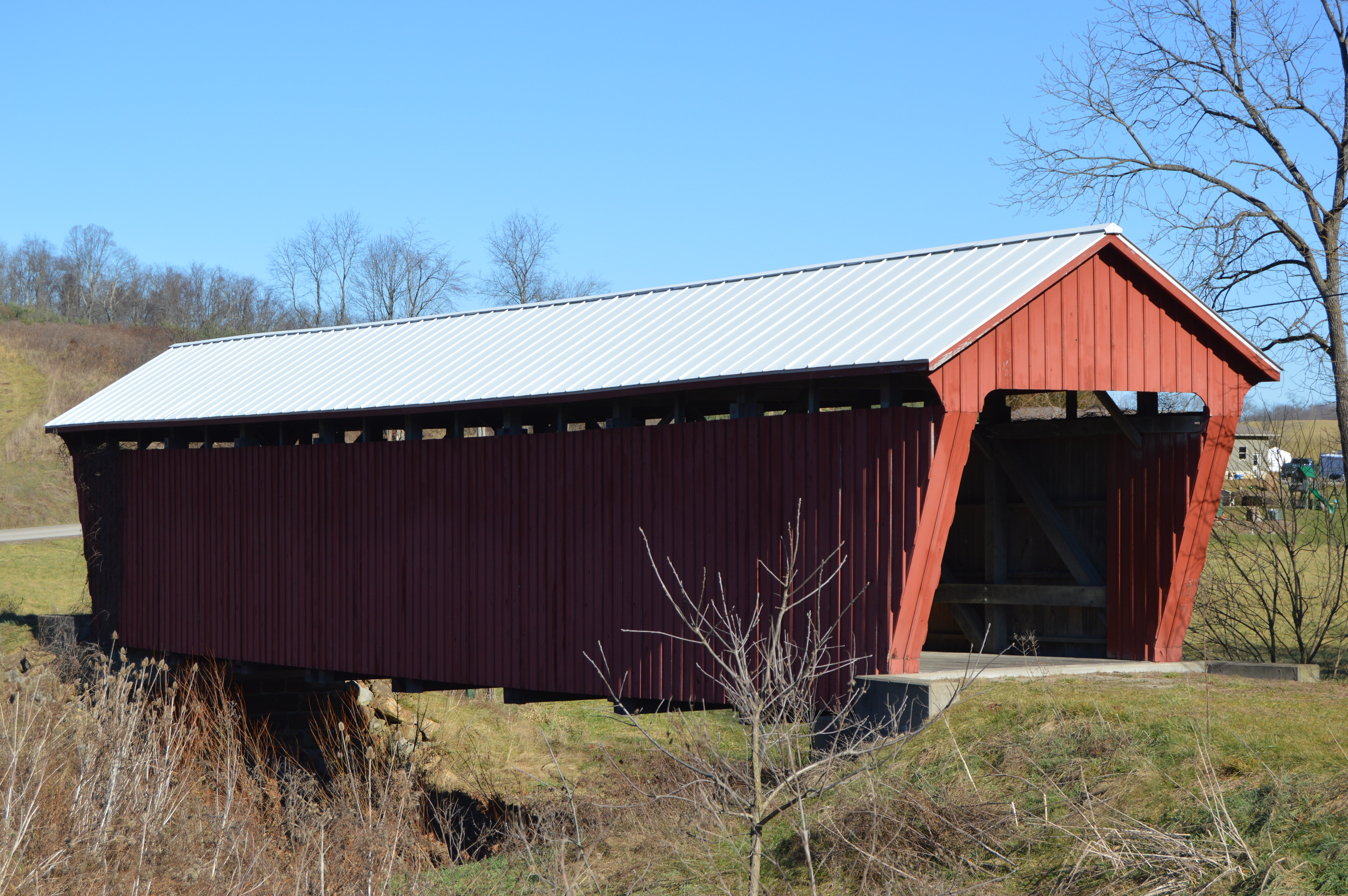
- The Parrish Covered Bridge on Rich Valley Road

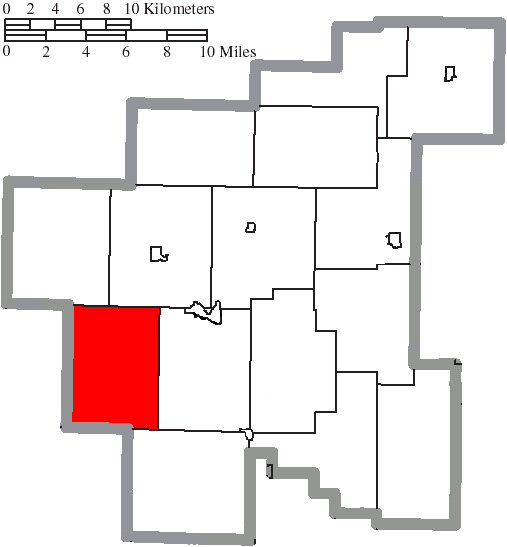
- Location of Sharon Township in Noble County
- Coordinates: 39°42′14″N 81°35′14″W
- Country: United States
- State: Ohio
- County: Noble

Area
  - Total: 27.4 sq mi (70.9 km^{2})
  - Land: 27.3 sq mi (70.8 km^{2})
  - Water: 0 sq mi (0.0 km^{2})
- Elevation: 981 ft (299 m)

Population (2020)
  - Total: 330
  - Density: 12/sq mi (4.7/km^{2})
- Time zone: UTC-5 (Eastern (EST))
  - Summer (DST): UTC-4 (EDT)
- FIPS code: 39-71826
- GNIS feature ID: 1086751

Sharon Township is one of the fifteen townships of Noble County, Ohio, United States. The 2020 census found 330 people in the township.

== Geography ==
Located in the southwestern part of the county, it borders the following townships:

- Noble Township - northeast
- Olive Township - east
- Jackson Township - southeast
- Center Township, Morgan County - southwest
- Manchester Township, Morgan County - west
- Brookfield Township - northwest

No municipalities are located in Sharon Township.

== Name and history ==
Sharon Township derives its name from Sharon, Connecticut. Statewide, other Sharon Townships are located in Franklin, Medina, and Richland counties.

== Government ==
The township is governed by a three-member board of trustees, who are elected in November of odd-numbered years to a four-year term beginning on the following January 1. Two are elected in the year after the presidential election and one is elected in the year before it. There is also an elected township fiscal officer, who serves a four-year term beginning on April 1 of the year after the election, which is held in November of the year before the presidential election. Vacancies in the fiscal officership or on the board of trustees are filled by the remaining trustees.
