= Morgan Township, Morgan County, Ohio =

Township in Ohio, US

- Township
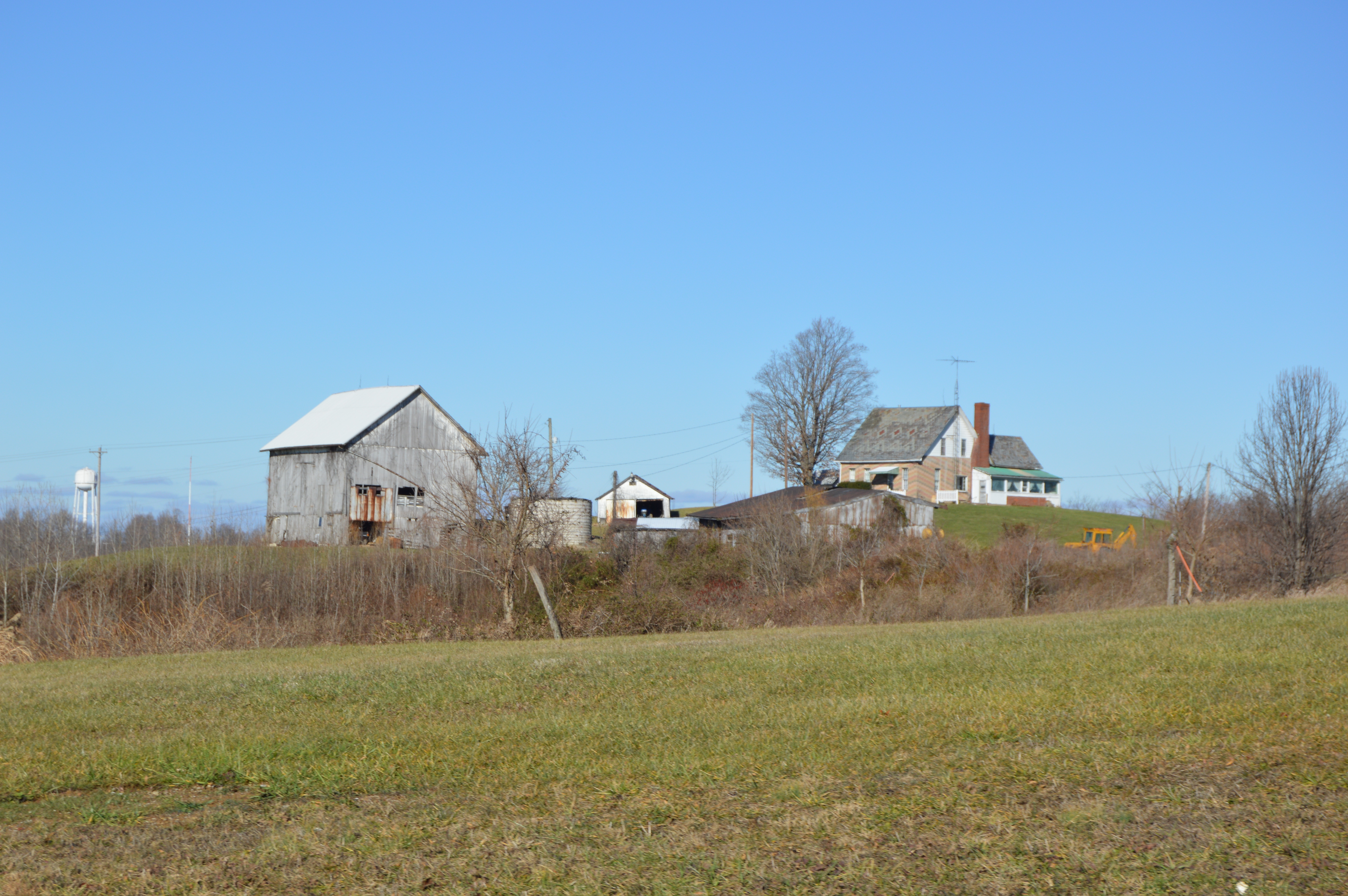
- Along State Route 60 east of McConnelsville

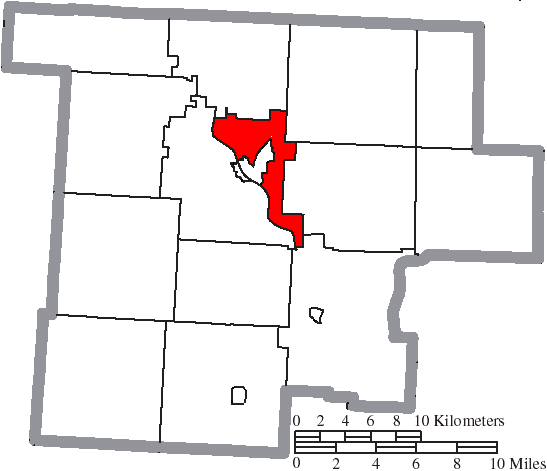
- Location of Morgan Township in Morgan County
- Coordinates: 39°39′6″N 81°50′58″W
- Country: United States
- State: Ohio
- County: Morgan

Area
  - Total: 12.4 sq mi (32.1 km^{2})
  - Land: 12.1 sq mi (31.4 km^{2})
  - Water: 0.27 sq mi (0.7 km^{2})
- Elevation: 810 ft (247 m)

Population (2020)
  - Total: 2,287
  - Density: 189/sq mi (72.8/km^{2})
- Time zone: UTC-5 (Eastern (EST))
  - Summer (DST): UTC-4 (EDT)
- FIPS code: 39-52122
- GNIS feature ID: 1086692

Morgan Township is one of the fourteen townships of Morgan County, Ohio, United States. The 2020 census found 2,287 people in the township.

== Geography ==
Located in the central part of the county, it borders the following townships:

- Bloom Township - north
- Bristol Township - northeast
- Meigsville Township - east
- Windsor Township - southeast
- Malta Township - west

Much of Morgan Township is occupied by McConnelsville, the county seat and largest village of Morgan County.

== Name and history ==
It is one of six Morgan Townships statewide.

== Government ==
The township is governed by a three-member board of trustees, who are elected in November of odd-numbered years to a four-year term beginning on the following January 1. Two are elected in the year after the presidential election and one is elected in the year before it. There is also an elected township fiscal officer, who serves a four-year term beginning on April 1 of the year after the election, which is held in November of the year before the presidential election. Vacancies in the fiscal officership or on the board of trustees are filled by the remaining trustees.
