= Deerfield Township, Morgan County, Ohio =

Township in Ohio, US

- Township
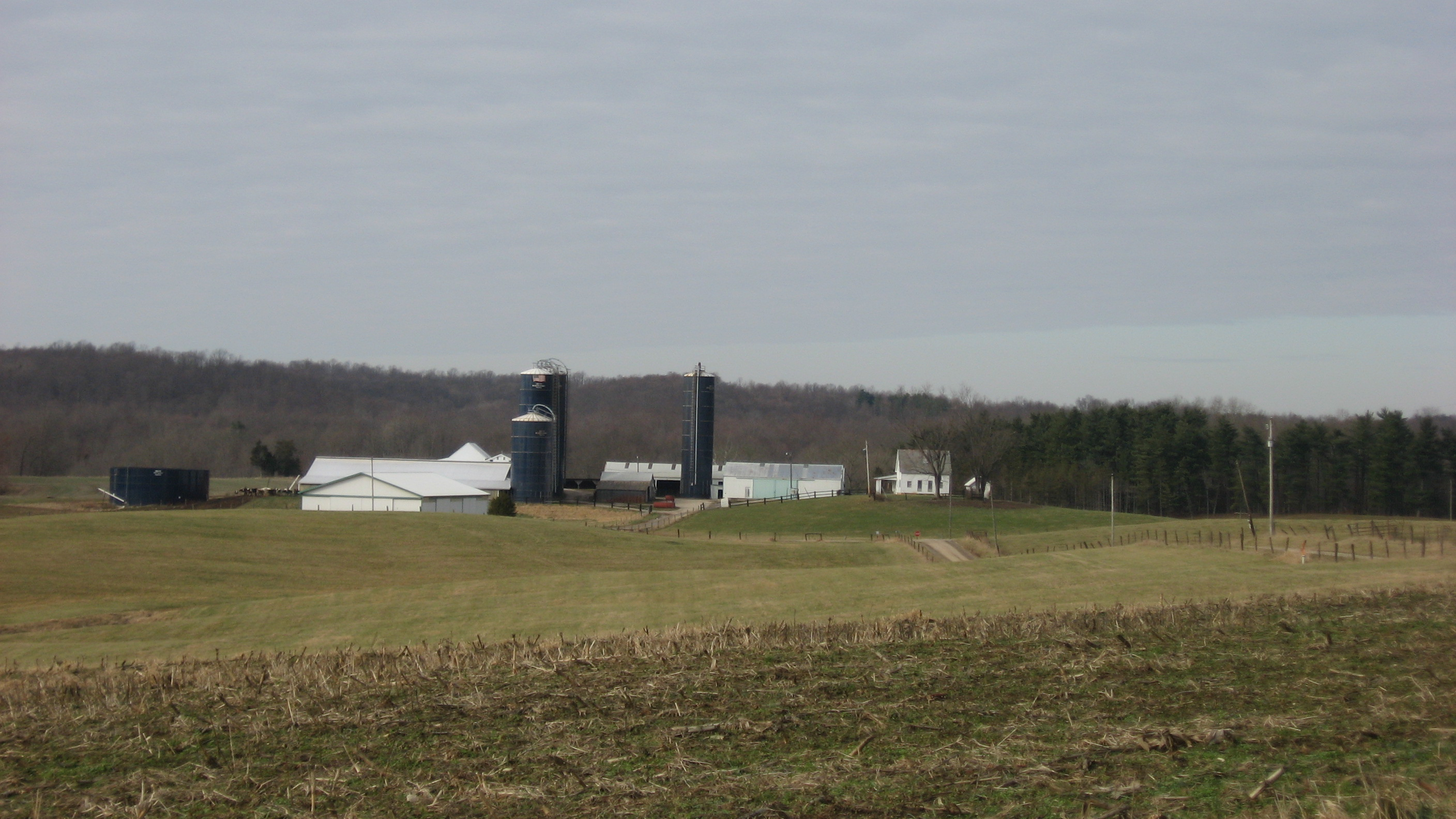
- One of the township's few farms

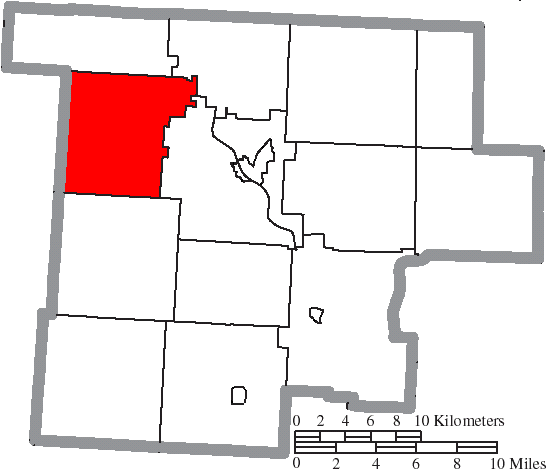
- Location of Deerfield Township in Morgan County
- Coordinates: 39°39′52″N 81°58′42″W
- Country: United States
- State: Ohio
- County: Morgan

Area
  - Total: 33.0 sq mi (85.5 km^{2})
  - Land: 33.0 sq mi (85.4 km^{2})
  - Water: 0.039 sq mi (0.1 km^{2})
- Elevation: 1,001 ft (305 m)

Population (2020)
  - Total: 839
  - Density: 25.4/sq mi (9.82/km^{2})
- Time zone: UTC-5 (Eastern (EST))
  - Summer (DST): UTC-4 (EDT)
- FIPS code: 39-21182
- GNIS feature ID: 1086686

Deerfield Township is one of the fourteen townships of Morgan County, Ohio, United States. The 2020 census found 839 people in the township.

== Geography ==
Located in the northwestern part of the county, it borders the following townships:

- York Township - north
- Bloom Township - northeast
- Malta Township - east
- Union Township - south
- Monroe Township, Perry County - southwest corner
- Bearfield Township, Perry County - west

No municipalities are located in Deerfield Township.

== Name and history ==
Statewide, other Deerfield Townships are located in Portage, Ross, and Warren counties.

== Government ==
The township is governed by a three-member board of trustees, who are elected in November of odd-numbered years to a four-year term beginning on the following January 1. Two are elected in the year after the presidential election and one is elected in the year before it. There is also an elected township fiscal officer, who serves a four-year term beginning on April 1 of the year after the election, which is held in November of the year before the presidential election. Vacancies in the fiscal officership or on the board of trustees are filled by the remaining trustees.

== Notable people ==
- Cyrus M. Butt, Wisconsin lawyer, soldier, and state senator, was born in the township.
