= Malta Township, Morgan County, Ohio =

Township in Ohio, US

- Township
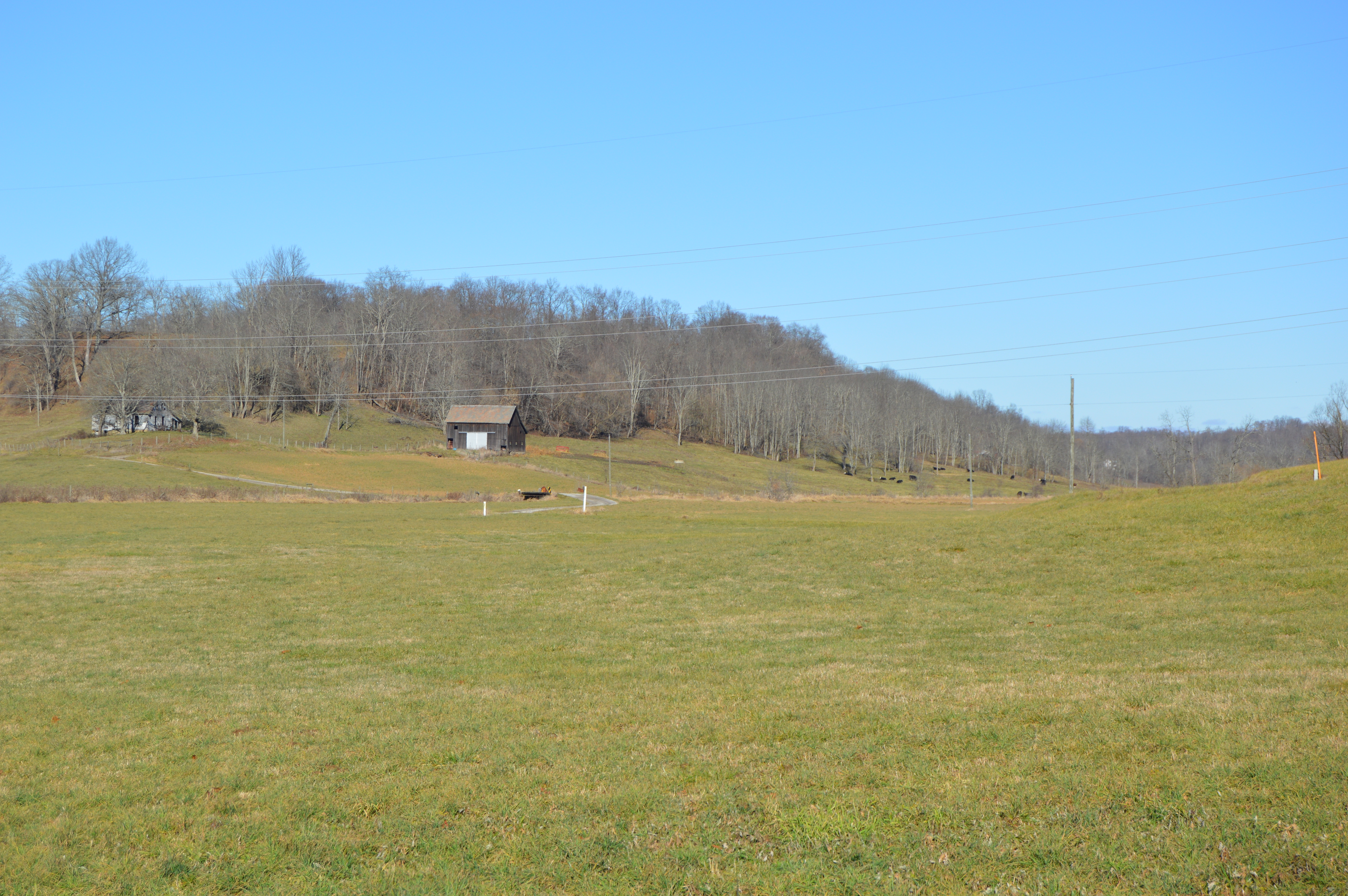
- Fields on Big Oak Road

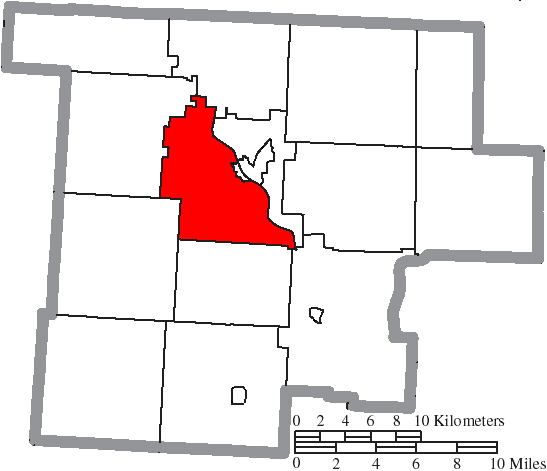
- Location of Malta Township in Morgan County
- Coordinates: 39°38′22″N 81°52′34″W
- Country: United States
- State: Ohio
- County: Morgan

Area
  - Total: 26.2 sq mi (67.9 km^{2})
  - Land: 25.9 sq mi (67.2 km^{2})
  - Water: 0.27 sq mi (0.7 km^{2})
- Elevation: 778 ft (237 m)

Population (2020)
  - Total: 1,686
  - Density: 65.0/sq mi (25.1/km^{2})
- Time zone: UTC-5 (Eastern (EST))
  - Summer (DST): UTC-4 (EDT)
- ZIP code: 43758
- Area code: 740
- FIPS code: 39-46984
- GNIS feature ID: 1086688

Malta Township is one of the fourteen townships of Morgan County, Ohio, United States. The 2020 census found 1,686 people in the township.

== Geography ==
Located in the central part of the county, it borders the following townships:

- Bloom Township - north
- Morgan Township - east
- Windsor Township - southeast
- Penn Township - south
- Union Township - southwest
- Deerfield Township - west

The village of Malta is located along the eastern edge of Malta Township, along the Muskingum River and across from the county seat of McConnelsville.

== Name and history ==
It is the only Malta Township statewide.

== Government ==
The township is governed by a three-member board of trustees, who are elected in November of odd-numbered years to a four-year term beginning on the following January 1. Two are elected in the year after the presidential election and one is elected in the year before it. There is also an elected township fiscal officer, who serves a four-year term beginning on April 1 of the year after the election, which is held in November of the year before the presidential election. Vacancies in the fiscal officership or on the board of trustees are filled by the remaining trustees.
