= Morgan County Airport (Ohio) =

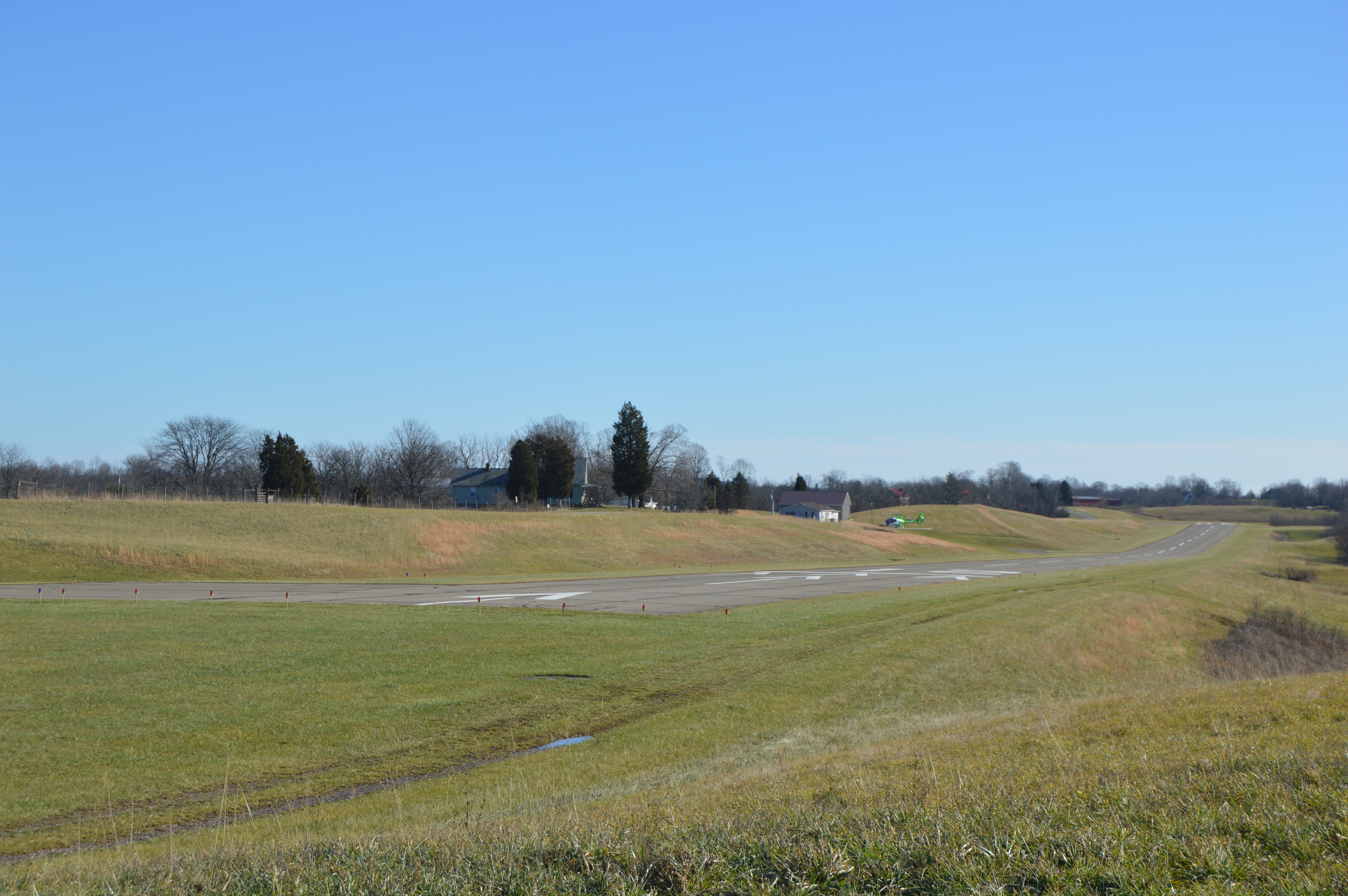
- Western end of Runway 12
- IATA: none; ICAO: none; FAA LID: I71

Summary
- Airport type: Public
- Owner: Morgan County Airport Authority
- Serves: Morgan County, Ohio
- Location: McConnelsville, Ohio
- Elevation AMSL: 1,000 ft / 305 m
- Coordinates: 39°39′15″N 081°48′11″W

Map
- Location of airport in Ohio I71 (the United States)

Runways
Direction	Length		Surface
Direction	ft	m	Surface
12/30	3,500	1,067	Asphalt

Statistics (2009)
- Aircraft operations: 5,625
- Based aircraft: 5
- Source: Federal Aviation Administration

Morgan County Airport (FAA LID: I71) is a public use airport in Morgan County, Ohio, United States. It is owned by the Morgan County Airport Authority and located three nautical miles (6 km) east of the central business district of McConnelsville, Ohio.

== History ==
Efforts to build an airport in Morgan County began as early as February 1965 when an airport committee was authorized. It was organized at a meeting the following month. The airport authority approved the purchase of 30 to 40 acres (12 to 16 ha) of land in January 1967. By late March, 125 acres (51 ha) had been secured. Planning for a fund drive to make up the $60,000 difference not covered by a $100,000 state grant began in April. A contract for site preparation was awarded in May. Although the airport was dedicated by Governor Jim Rhodes on 29 October 1967, it actually opened on October 14th, when an air tour was held.

A project to prevent soil erosion at the airport had begun by mid October 1970.

== Facilities and aircraft ==
Morgan County Airport covers an area of 123 acres (50 ha) at an elevation of 1,000 feet (305 m) above mean sea level. It has one runway designated 12/30 with an asphalt surface measuring 3,500 by 65 feet (1,067 x 20 m).

The airport has a fixed-base operator that sells fuel.

Currently there are seven aircraft based at this airport: 6 single-engine airplanes and 1 helicopter.

The McKendree Methodist Church is adjacent to the airport.

== Accidents and incidents ==
- On June 30, 2002, a Piper J3 Cub was substantially damaged while landing at Morgan County Airport. After touchdown during a touch-and-go landing, the airplane started drifting to the right, and the pilot reported he corrected with "too much" left rudder pedal input and with light braking. The aircraft began to turn and departed the runway, where it struck a runway light, traveled over rough terrain, and came to rest inverted. The probable cause of the accident was found to be the pilot's failure to maintain aircraft control while landing.

== See also ==
- List of airports in Ohio
