= Reinersville, Ohio =

Unincorporated community in Ohio, U.S.

Coordinates: 39°41′12″N 81°39′39″W

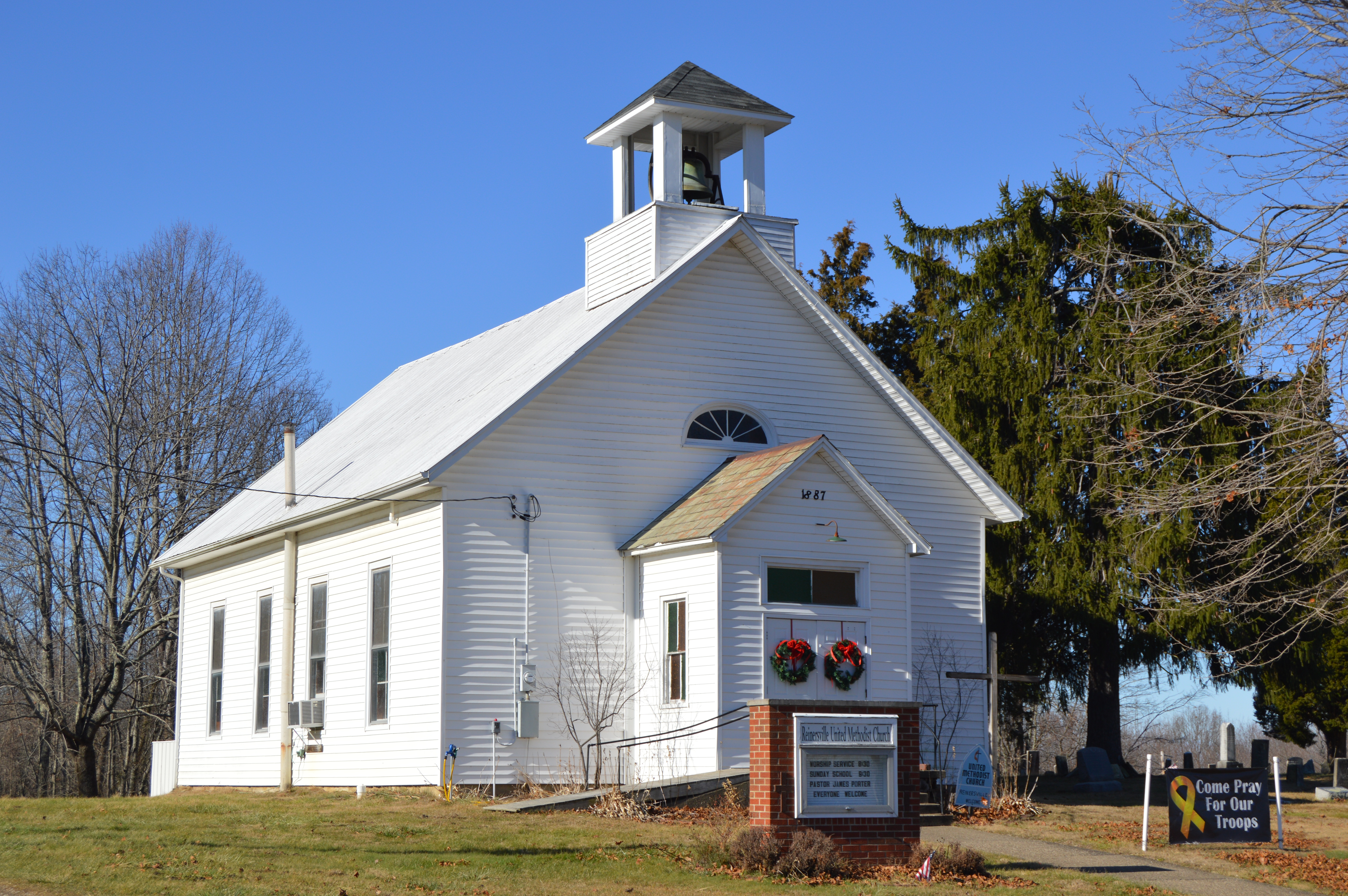
Methodist church

Reinersville is an unincorporated community in Morgan County, in the U.S. state of Ohio.

== History ==
Reinersville was laid out in 1848 by Samuel Reiner, and named for him. A post office was established at Reinersville in 1854, and remained in operation until 1978.
