= Triadelphia, Ohio =

Unincorporated community in Ohio, U.S.

Coordinates: 39°41′59″N 81°57′55″W

Triadelphia is an unincorporated community in Morgan County, in the U.S. state of Ohio.

== History ==
Triadelphia was laid out and platted in 1838 with 26 lots; at the town center, Juniper and High Streets crossed at right angles; there was also a Center Street. Those streets and names have not survived to the present.

Triadelphia is a name derived from Greek meaning "three brothers" and is thought to have been inspired by Philadelphia, where the Roberts family originated. The three brothers were Joseph, Nathan, and Samuel Roberts. Anticipating the town, Nathan purchased 160 acres from his brother Joseph in 1836, having paid $160. A post office was established at Triadelphia in 1849, and remained in operation until 1930. The town is thought to have been an important stop on the Underground Railroad due to the activities of William Woodward.
