= Windsor Township, Morgan County, Ohio =

Township in Ohio, US

- Township
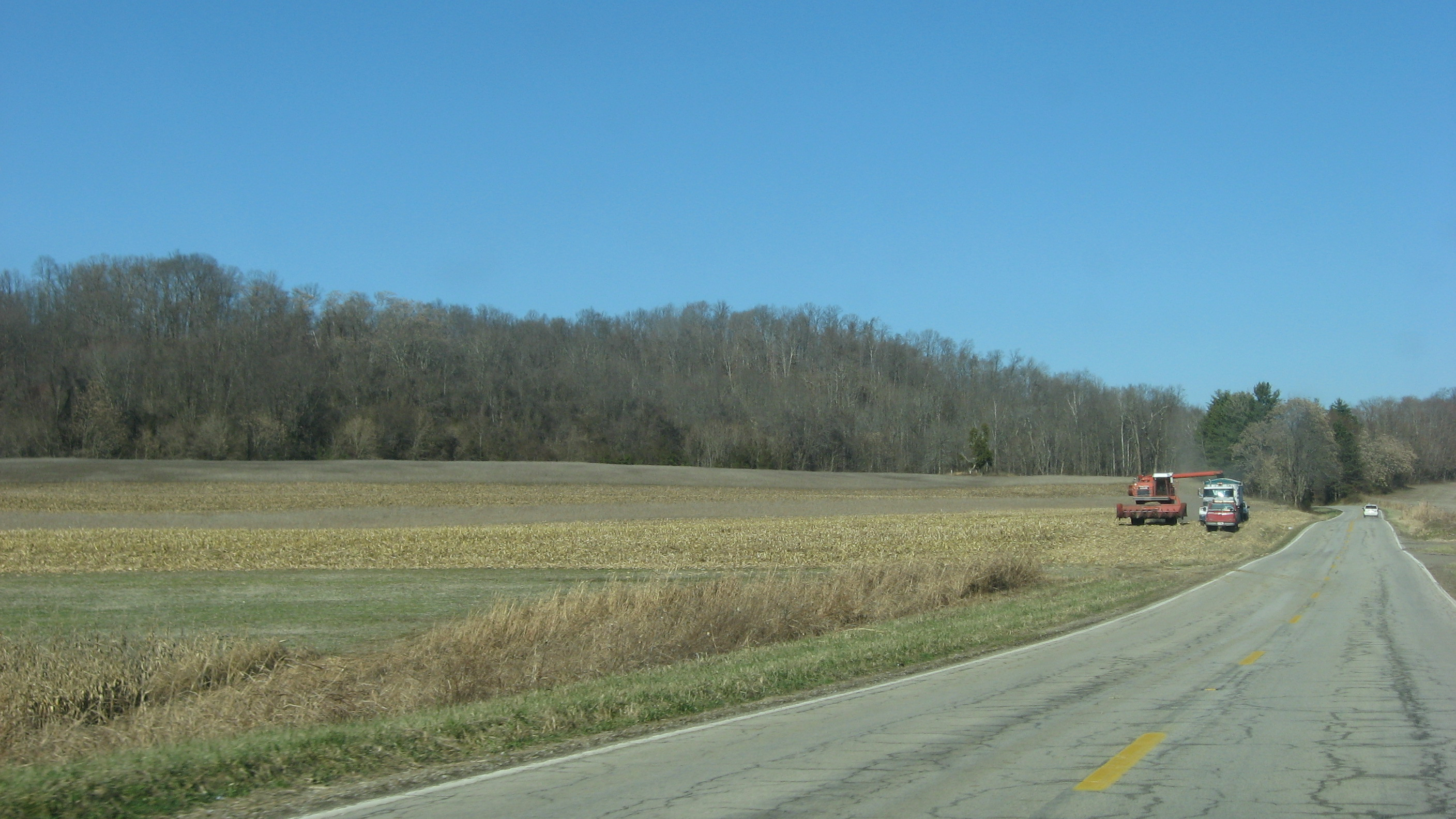
- Corn harvest in the Big Bottom, east of Stockport

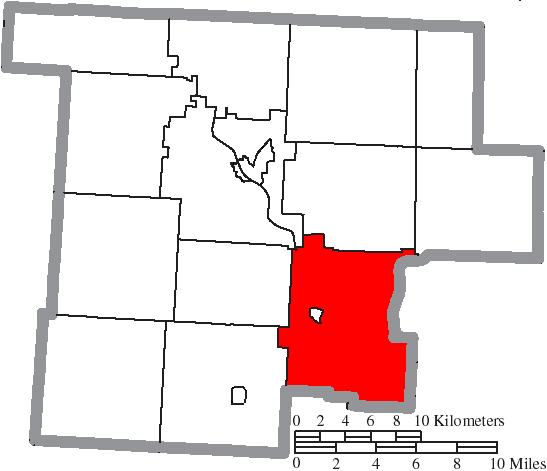
- Location of Windsor Township in Morgan County
- Coordinates: 39°33′0″N 81°46′33″W
- Country: United States
- State: Ohio
- County: Morgan

Area
  - Total: 43.6 sq mi (113.0 km^{2})
  - Land: 42.7 sq mi (110.5 km^{2})
  - Water: 0.97 sq mi (2.5 km^{2})
- Elevation: 794 ft (242 m)

Population (2020)
  - Total: 1,897
  - Density: 44.46/sq mi (17.17/km^{2})
- Time zone: UTC-5 (Eastern (EST))
  - Summer (DST): UTC-4 (EDT)
- FIPS code: 39-86016
- GNIS feature ID: 1086695

Windsor Township is one of the fourteen townships of Morgan County, Ohio, United States. The 2020 census found 1,897 people in the township.

== Geography ==
Located in the southeastern corner of the county, it borders the following townships:

- Meigsville Township - north
- Center Township - northeast
- Waterford Township, Washington County - east
- Watertown Township, Washington County - southeast, north of Palmer Township
- Palmer Township, Washington County - southeast, south of Watertown Township
- Wesley Township, Washington County - south
- Marion Township - southwest
- Penn Township - west
- Malta Township - northwest, west of Morgan Township
- Morgan Township - northwest, east of Malta Township

The village of Stockport is located in western Windsor Township.

== Name and history ==
Statewide, other Windsor Townships are located in Ashtabula and Lawrence counties.

== Government ==
The township is governed by a three-member board of trustees, who are elected in November of odd-numbered years to a four-year term beginning on the following January 1. Two are elected in the year after the presidential election and one is elected in the year before it. There is also an elected township fiscal officer, who serves a four-year term beginning on April 1 of the year after the election, which is held in November of the year before the presidential election. Vacancies in the fiscal officership or on the board of trustees are filled by the remaining trustees.
