= Bern Township, Ohio =

Township in Ohio, US

- Township
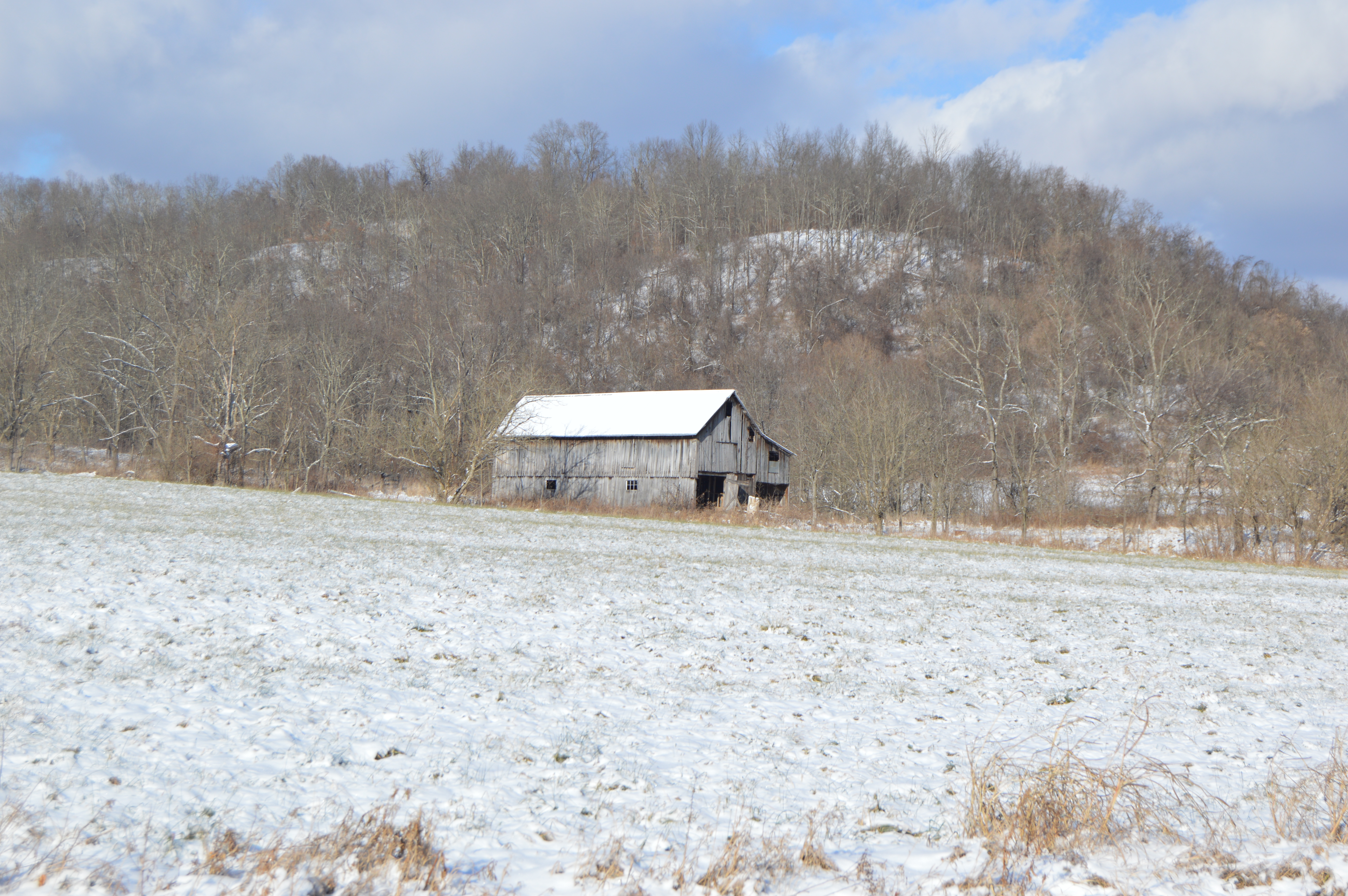
- Farm on State Route 550 east of Amesville

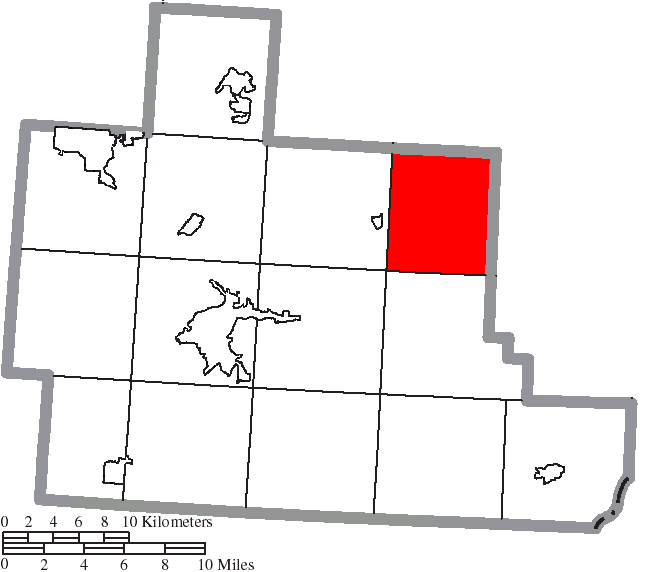
- Location of Bern Township in Athens County
- Coordinates: 39°24′26″N 81°54′27″W
- Country: United States
- State: Ohio
- County: Athens
- Named for: Bern, Switzerland

Area
  - Total: 31.4 sq mi (81.4 km^{2})
  - Land: 31.3 sq mi (81.0 km^{2})
  - Water: 0.15 sq mi (0.4 km^{2})
- Elevation: 650 ft (198 m)

Population (2020)
  - Total: 556
  - Density: 17.8/sq mi (6.86/km^{2})
- Time zone: UTC-5 (Eastern (EST))
  - Summer (DST): UTC-4 (EDT)
- FIPS code: 39-05942
- GNIS feature ID: 1085751

Bern Township is one of the fourteen townships of Athens County, Ohio, United States. The 2020 census found 556 people in the township.

== Geography ==
Located in the northeastern corner of the county, it borders the following townships:

- Marion Township, Morgan County - north
- Wesley Township, Washington County - east
- Decatur Township, Washington County - southeast corner
- Rome Township - south
- Canaan Township - southwest corner
- Ames Township - west
- Homer Township, Morgan County - northwest corner

== Communities ==
- Sharpsburg lies in the township's northwest corner and is home to the township's office.

== Name and history ==
Bern Township was organized in 1828, having previously been part of Ames Township. Bern Township is mostly coterminous with survey township 7 North, Range 12 West. Six sections forming the easternmost tier of the survey township were transferred in 1807 to Washington County.

It is the only Bern Township statewide, although there is a Berne Township in Fairfield County.

== Government ==
The township is governed by a three-member board of trustees, who are elected in November of odd-numbered years to a four-year term beginning on the following January 1. Two are elected in the year after the presidential election and one is elected in the year before it. There is also an elected township fiscal officer, who serves a four-year term beginning on April 1 of the year after the election, which is held in November of the year before the presidential election. Vacancies in the fiscal officership or on the board of trustees are filled by the remaining trustees.
