= Adams Covered Bridge =

- U.S. National Register of Historic Places
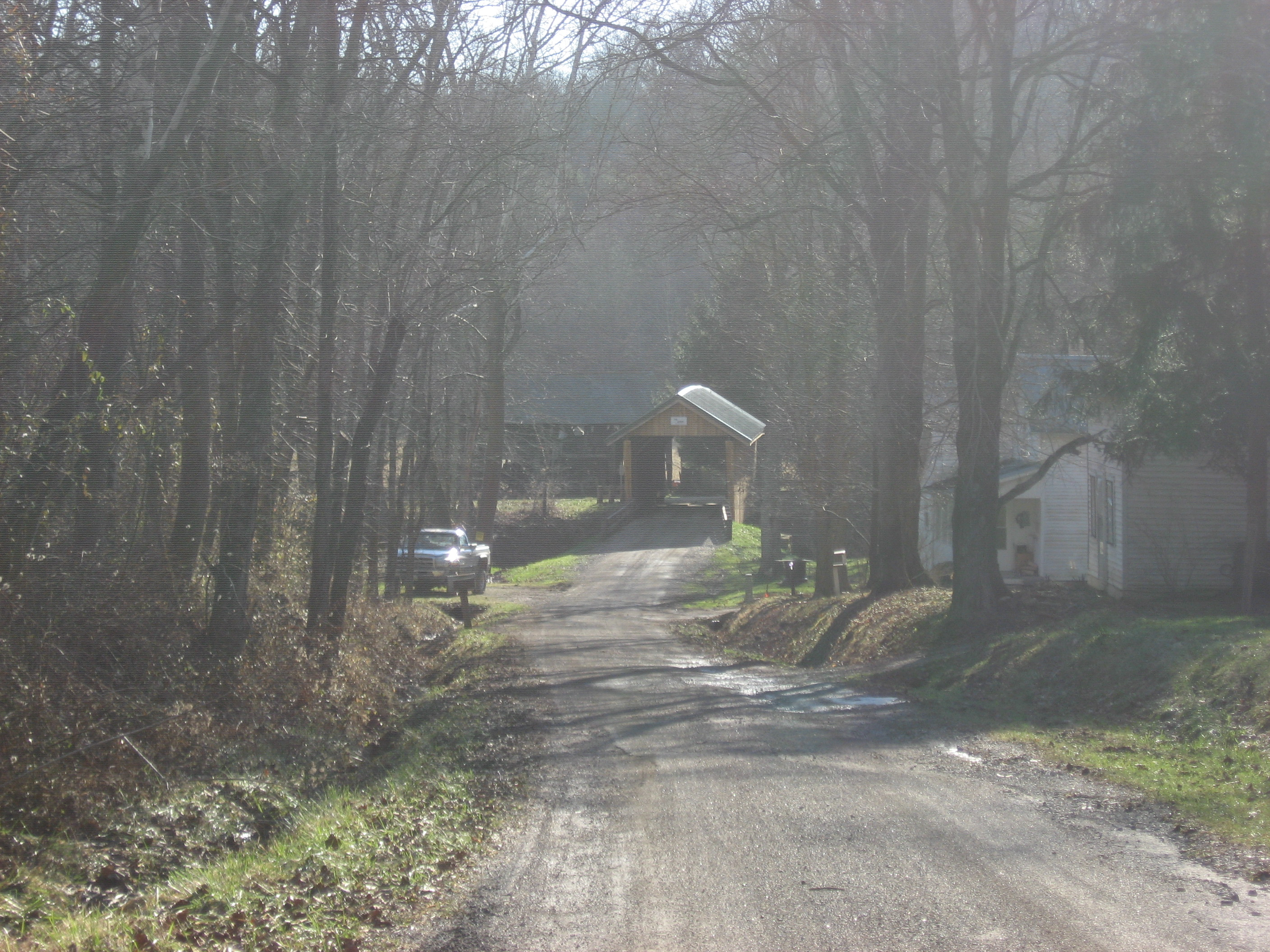
- View from the north

- Location within Ohio Location within the United States
- Nearest city: Malta, Ohio
- Coordinates: 39°37′27″N 82°1′58″W
- NRHP reference No.: 99000093
- Added to NRHP: 1999-02-05

Adams Covered Bridge is a 58-foot (18 m) historic covered bridge in Morgan County, Ohio spanning San Toy Creek near Malta. The bridge was built in 1875 using a "multiple kingpost truss" design. It is no longer used for traffic. It has also been known as the San Toy Bridge and as the Adams - San Toy Covered Bridge.

It was listed in the National Register in 1999.
