= Eagleport, Ohio =

Unincorporated community in Ohio, U.S.

Coordinates: 39°44′14″N 81°54′55″W

Eagleport is an unincorporated community in Morgan County, in the U.S. state of Ohio.

== History ==
Eagleport was laid out in 1837. A post office called Eagleport was established in 1873, and remained in operation until 1955.
