= Plantsville, Ohio =

Unincorporated community in Ohio, U.S.

Coordinates: 39°27′08″N 81°52′32″W

Plantsville is an unincorporated community in Morgan County, in the U.S. state of Ohio.

== History ==
A post office called Plantsville was established in 1888, and remained in operation until 1908.
