= Bristol Township, Morgan County, Ohio =

Township in Ohio, US

- Township
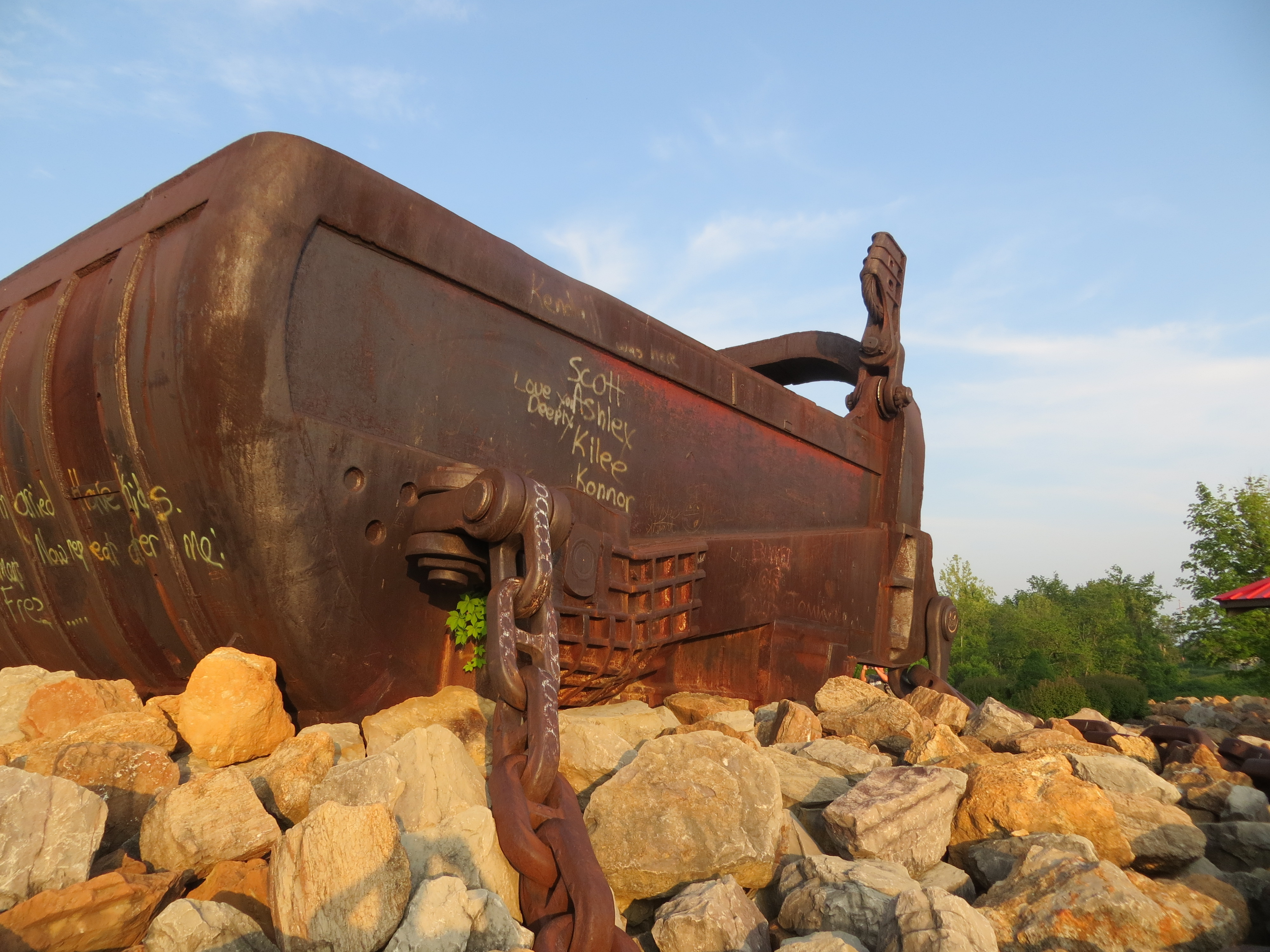
- Bucket from mining machine Big Muskie, preserved in a township park

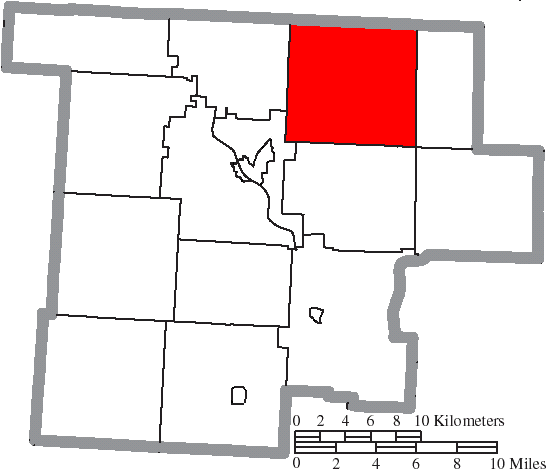
- Location of Bristol Township in Morgan County
- Coordinates: 39°42′29″N 81°44′41″W
- Country: United States
- State: Ohio
- County: Morgan

Area
  - Total: 38.6 sq mi (99.9 km^{2})
  - Land: 37.7 sq mi (97.6 km^{2})
  - Water: 0.89 sq mi (2.3 km^{2})
- Elevation: 843 ft (257 m)

Population (2020)
  - Total: 182
  - Density: 4.83/sq mi (1.86/km^{2})
- Time zone: UTC-5 (Eastern (EST))
  - Summer (DST): UTC-4 (EDT)
- FIPS code: 39-08910
- GNIS feature ID: 1086684

Bristol Township is one of the fourteen townships of Morgan County, Ohio, United States. The 2020 census found 182 people in the township.

== Geography ==
Located in the northern part of the county, it borders the following townships:

- Meigs Township, Muskingum County - north
- Brookfield Township, Noble County - northeast corner
- Manchester Township - east
- Center Township - southeast corner
- Meigsville Township - south
- Morgan Township - southwest
- Bloom Township - west
- Blue Rock Township, Muskingum County - northwest corner

No municipalities are located in Bristol Township.

== Name and history ==
Statewide, the only other Bristol Township is located in Trumbull County.

== Government ==
The township is governed by a three-member board of trustees, who are elected in November of odd-numbered years to a four-year term beginning on the following January 1. Two are elected in the year after the presidential election and one is elected in the year before it. There is also an elected township fiscal officer, who serves a four-year term beginning on April 1 of the year after the election, which is held in November of the year before the presidential election. Vacancies in the fiscal officership or on the board of trustees are filled by the remaining trustees.
