= Marion Township, Morgan County, Ohio =

Township in Ohio, US

- Township
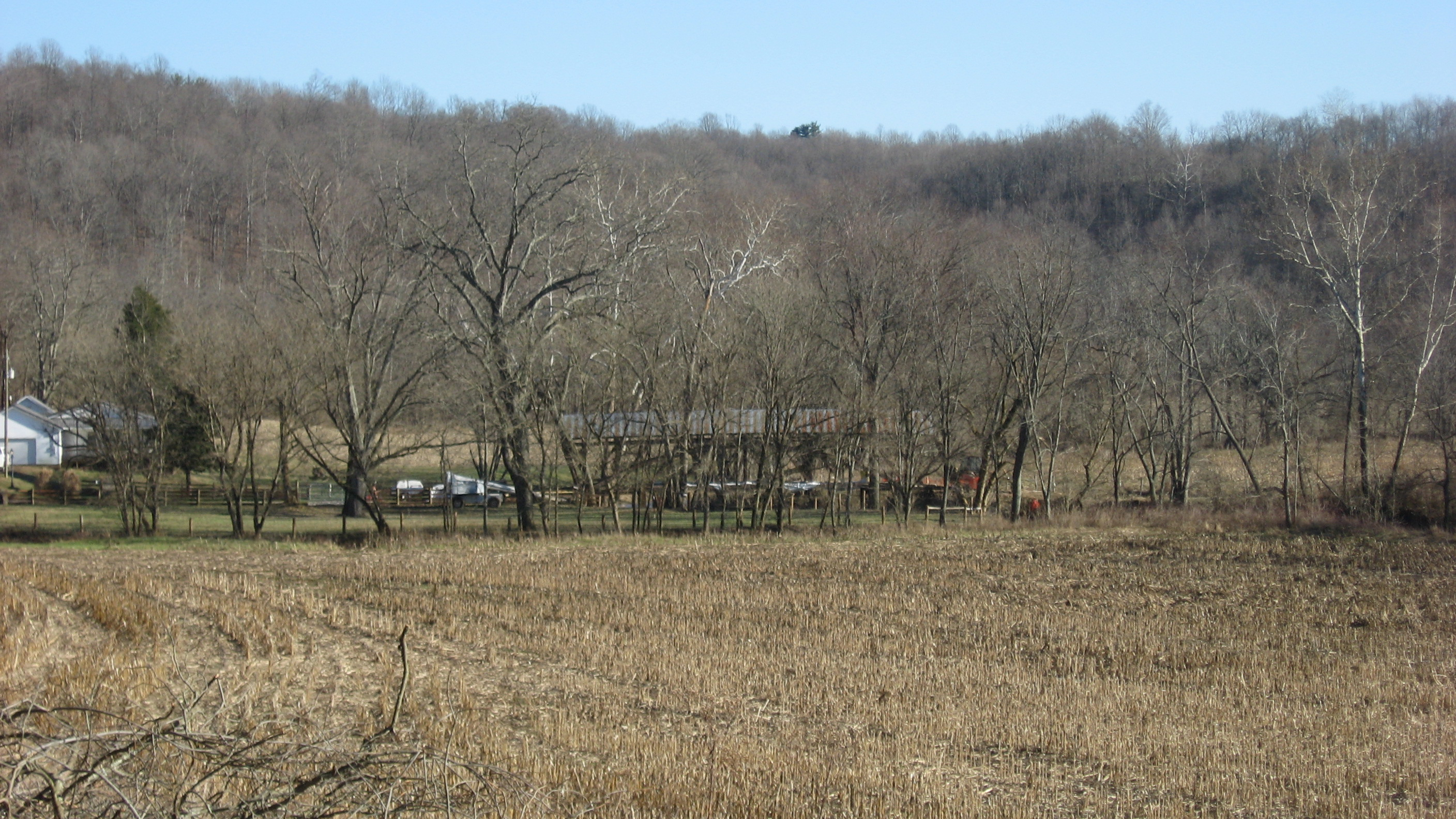
- Distant view of the Barkhurst Mill Covered Bridge

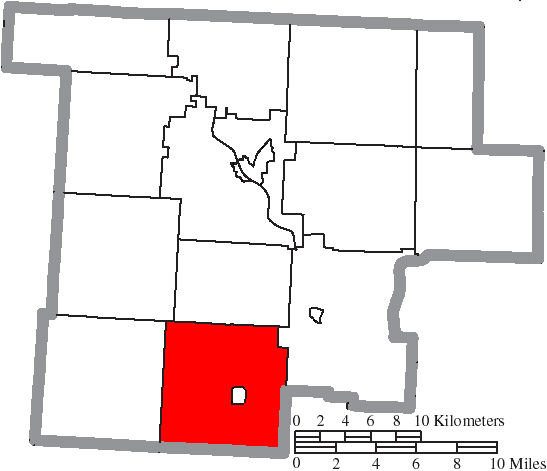
- Location of Marion Township in Morgan County
- Coordinates: 39°29′46″N 81°52′9″W
- Country: United States
- State: Ohio
- County: Morgan

Area
  - Total: 37.7 sq mi (97.6 km^{2})
  - Land: 37.7 sq mi (97.6 km^{2})
  - Water: 0 sq mi (0.0 km^{2})
- Elevation: 820 ft (250 m)

Population (2020)
  - Total: 1,181
  - Density: 31.3/sq mi (12.1/km^{2})
- Time zone: UTC-5 (Eastern (EST))
  - Summer (DST): UTC-4 (EDT)
- FIPS code: 39-47796
- GNIS feature ID: 1086690

Marion Township is one of the fourteen townships of Morgan County, Ohio, United States. The 2020 census found 1,181 people in the township.

== Geography ==
Located in the southern part of the county, it borders the following townships:

- Penn Township - north
- Windsor Township - northeast
- Wesley Township, Washington County - southeast
- Bern Township, Athens County - south
- Ames Township, Athens County - southwest corner
- Homer Township - west
- Union Township - northwest

The village of Chesterhill is located in central Marion Township.

Marion Township is the farthest south of all of Morgan County's townships.

== Name and history ==
It is one of twelve Marion Townships statewide.

== Government ==
The township is governed by a three-member board of trustees, who are elected in November of odd-numbered years to a four-year term beginning on the following January 1. Two are elected in the year after the presidential election and one is elected in the year before it. There is also an elected township fiscal officer, who serves a four-year term beginning on April 1 of the year after the election, which is held in November of the year before the presidential election. Vacancies in the fiscal officership or on the board of trustees are filled by the remaining trustees.
