= Morgan County, Ohio =

County in Ohio, United States

- County
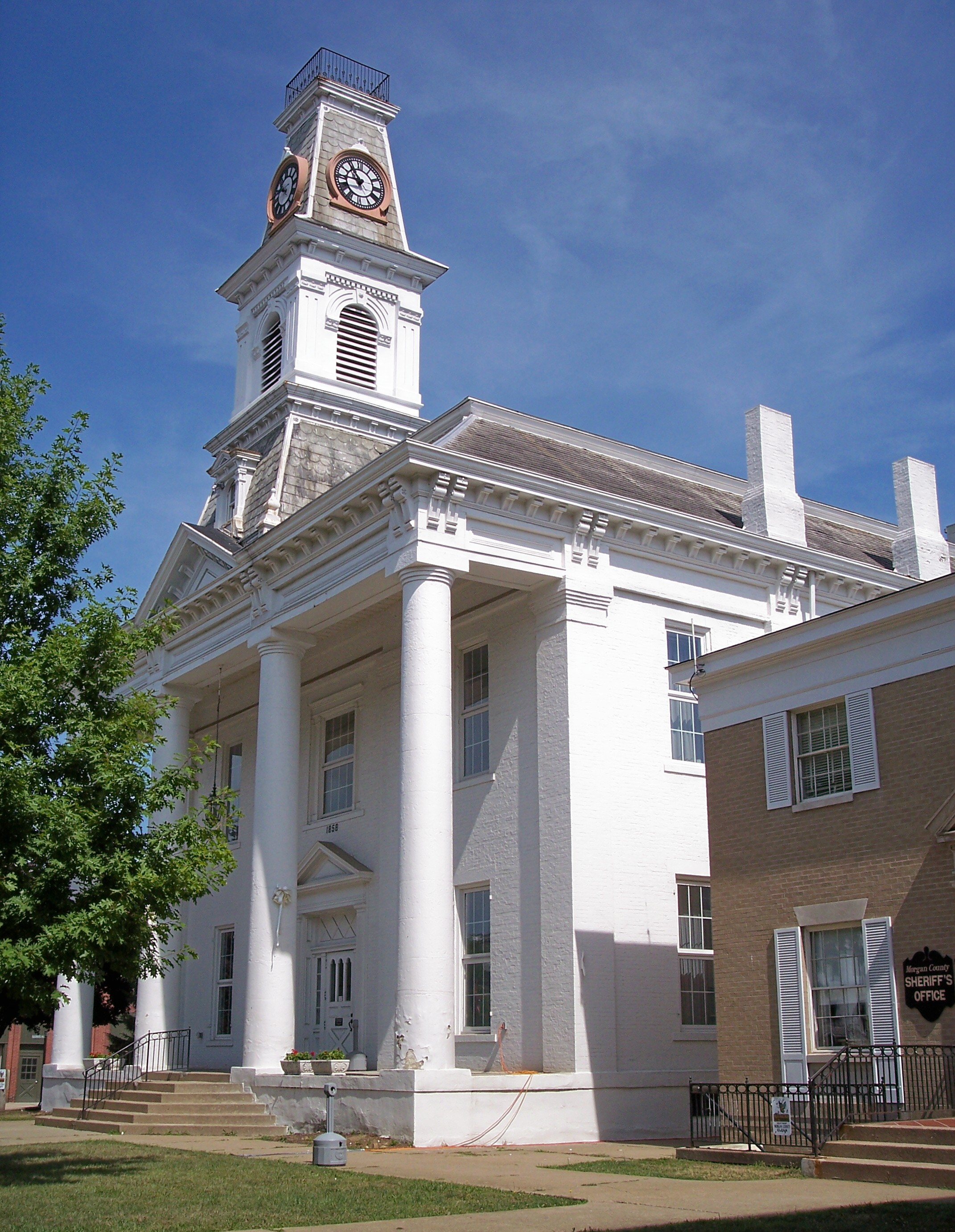
- The Morgan County Courthouse in McConnelsville

- Flag Seal

- Location within the U.S. state of Ohio
- Coordinates: 39°37′N 81°51′W
- Country: United States
- State: Ohio
- Founded: March 1, 1819
- Named for: Daniel Morgan
- Seat: McConnelsville
- Largest village: McConnelsville

Area
  - Total: 422 sq mi (1,090 km^{2})
  - Land: 416 sq mi (1,080 km^{2})
  - Water: 5.4 sq mi (14 km^{2}) 1.3%

Population (2020)
  - Total: 13,802
  - Estimate (2025): 13,626 ▼
  - Density: 33.2/sq mi (12.8/km^{2})
- Time zone: UTC−5 (Eastern)
  - Summer (DST): UTC−4 (EDT)
- Congressional district: 12th
- Website: www.morgancounty-oh.gov

Morgan County is a county located in the U.S. state of Ohio. As of the 2020 census, the population was 13,802, making it the third-least populous county in Ohio. Its county seat is McConnelsville. The county was created in 1817 and later organized in 1819. It is named for Daniel Morgan, an officer in the American Revolutionary War.

== History ==
Morgan County was formed on December 29, 1817, from portions of Guernsey, Muskingum and Washington counties. It was named after Daniel Morgan, a member in the Congress from Virginia, and general in the American Revolutionary War.

== Geography ==
According to the United States Census Bureau, the county has a total area of 422 square miles (1,090 km^{2}), of which 416 square miles (1,080 km^{2}) is land and 5.4 square miles (14 km^{2}) (1.3%) is water.

=== Adjacent counties ===
- Muskingum County (north)
- Noble County (northeast)
- Washington County (southeast)
- Athens County (southwest)
- Perry County (west)

== Public areas ==
- Wayne National Forest
- Burr Oak State Park

== Demographics ==
Historical population
Census	Pop.	Note	%±
1820	5,297		—
1830	11,800		122.8%
1840	20,852		76.7%
1850	28,585		37.1%
1860	22,119		−22.6%
1870	20,363		−7.9%
1880	20,072		−1.4%
1890	19,143		−4.6%
1900	17,905		−6.5%
1910	16,097		−10.1%
1920	14,555		−9.6%
1930	13,583		−6.7%
1940	14,227		4.7%
1950	12,836		−9.8%
1960	12,747		−0.7%
1970	12,375		−2.9%
1980	14,241		15.1%
1990	14,194		−0.3%
2000	14,897		5.0%
2010	15,054		1.1%
2020	13,802		−8.3%
2025 (est.)	13,626	▼	−1.3%
U.S. Decennial Census; 1790–1960 1900–1990; 1990–2000 2010–2020

=== 2020 census ===
As of the 2020 census, the county had a population of 13,802. The median age was 45.7 years. 20.7% of residents were under the age of 18 and 22.4% of residents were 65 years of age or older. For every 100 females there were 99.3 males, and for every 100 females age 18 and over there were 99.4 males age 18 and over.

There were 5,845 households in the county, of which 26.5% had children under the age of 18 living in them. Of all households, 49.4% were married-couple households, 19.6% were households with a male householder and no spouse or partner present, and 23.8% were households with a female householder and no spouse or partner present. About 30.3% of all households were made up of individuals and 15.5% had someone living alone who was 65 years of age or older.

There were 7,232 housing units, of which 19.2% were vacant. Among occupied housing units, 77.2% were owner-occupied and 22.8% were renter-occupied. The homeowner vacancy rate was 1.6% and the rental vacancy rate was 5.8%.

Less than 0.1% of residents lived in urban areas, while 100.0% lived in rural areas.

=== Racial and ethnic composition ===
Morgan County, Ohio – Racial and ethnic composition Note: the US Census treats Hispanic/Latino as an ethnic category. This table excludes Latinos from the racial categories and assigns them to a separate category. Hispanics/Latinos may be of any race.
Race / Ethnicity (NH = Non-Hispanic)	Pop 1980	Pop 1990	Pop 2000	Pop 2010	Pop 2020	% 1980	% 1990	% 2000	% 2010	% 2020
White alone (NH)	13,542	13,493	13,908	13,972	12,525	95.09%	95.06%	93.36%	92.81%	90.75%
Black or African American alone (NH)	547	570	504	428	396	3.84%	4.02%	3.38%	2.84%	2.87%
Native American or Alaska Native alone (NH)	42	63	51	44	20	0.29%	0.44%	0.34%	0.29%	0.14%
Asian alone (NH)	13	12	12	17	24	0.09%	0.08%	0.08%	0.11%	0.17%
Native Hawaiian or Pacific Islander alone (NH)	x	x	0	0	2	x	x	0.00%	0.00%	0.01%
Other race alone (NH)	34	20	29	26	49	0.24%	0.14%	0.19%	0.17%	0.36%
Mixed race or Multiracial (NH)	x	x	332	470	659	x	x	2.23%	3.12%	4.77%
Hispanic or Latino (any race)	63	36	61	97	127	0.44%	0.25%	0.41%	0.64%	0.92%
Total	14,241	14,194	14,897	15,054	13,802	100.00%	100.00%	100.00%	100.00%	100.00%

=== 2010 census ===
As of the 2010 United States census, there were 15,054 people, 6,034 households, and 4,140 families living in the county. The population density was 36.2 inhabitants per square mile (14.0/km^{2}). There were 7,892 housing units at an average density of 19.0 units per square mile (7.3 units/km^{2}). The racial makeup of the county was 93.2% white, 2.9% black or African American, 0.3% American Indian, 0.1% Asian, 0.2% from other races, and 3.3% from two or more races. Those of Hispanic or Latino origin made up 0.6% of the population. In terms of ancestry, 21.2% were German, 12.9% were English, 12.7% were Irish, and 9.8% were American.

Of the 6,034 households, 29.7% had children under the age of 18 living with them, 53.4% were married couples living together, 10.4% had a female householder with no husband present, 31.4% were non-families, and 26.3% of all households were made up of individuals. The average household size was 2.46 and the average family size was 2.94. The median age was 42.4 years.

The median income for a household in the county was $34,962 and the median income for a family was $40,440. Males had a median income of $37,173 versus $30,176 for females. The per capita income for the county was $18,777. About 15.7% of families and 19.1% of the population were below the poverty line, including 25.2% of those under age 18 and 12.6% of those age 65 or over.

=== 2000 census ===
As of the census of 2000, there were 14,897 people, 5,890 households, and 4,176 families living in the county. The population density was 36 people per square mile (14 people/km^{2}). There were 7,771 housing units at an average density of 19 units per square mile (7.3/km^{2}). The racial makeup of the county was 93.66% White, 3.41% Black or African American, 0.35% Native American, 0.08% Asian, 0.26% from other races, and 2.24% from two or more races. 0.41% of the population were Hispanic or Latino of any race.

There were 5,890 households, out of which 30.90% had children under the age of 18 living with them, 56.90% were married couples living together, 9.90% had a female householder with no husband present, and 29.10% were non-families. 25.50% of all households were made up of individuals, and 12.00% had someone living alone who was 65 years of age or older. The average household size was 2.50 and the average family size was 2.98.

In the county, the population was spread out, with 25.30% under the age of 18, 7.80% from 18 to 24, 26.30% from 25 to 44, 25.00% from 45 to 64, and 15.60% who were 65 years of age or older. The median age was 39 years. For every 100 females there were 96.50 males. For every 100 females age 18 and over, there were 94.90 males.

The median income for a household in the county was $28,868, and the median income for a family was $34,973. Males had a median income of $30,411 versus $21,039 for females. The per capita income for the county was $13,967. About 15.70% of families and 18.40% of the population were below the poverty line, including 25.10% of those under age 18 and 12.40% of those age 65 or over.

== Politics ==
Morgan County is a stronghold Republican county in presidential elections. The only Democratic presidential candidates to win the county were Woodrow Wilson in 1912 and Lyndon B. Johnson in 1964, but Bill Clinton came within 181 votes of carrying it in 1996.

United States presidential election results for Morgan County, Ohio
Year	Republican		Democratic		Third party(ies)	
Year	No.	%	No.	%	No.	%
1856	2,125	53.19%	1,669	41.78%	201	5.03%
1860	2,445	57.03%	1,757	40.98%	85	1.98%
1864	2,601	60.14%	1,724	39.86%	0	0.00%
1868	2,521	57.09%	1,895	42.91%	0	0.00%
1872	2,339	58.23%	1,551	38.61%	127	3.16%
1876	2,376	51.75%	2,108	45.92%	107	2.33%
1880	2,510	53.11%	2,091	44.24%	125	2.64%
1884	2,556	55.13%	1,972	42.54%	108	2.33%
1888	2,531	53.97%	1,974	42.09%	185	3.94%
1892	2,399	51.98%	1,956	42.38%	260	5.63%
1896	2,531	51.12%	2,375	47.97%	45	0.91%
1900	2,639	53.40%	2,188	44.27%	115	2.33%
1904	2,572	58.79%	1,612	36.85%	191	4.37%
1908	2,445	53.99%	1,932	42.66%	152	3.36%
1912	1,448	35.70%	1,633	40.26%	975	24.04%
1916	2,136	51.58%	1,833	44.26%	172	4.15%
1920	4,127	64.26%	2,157	33.59%	138	2.15%
1924	3,553	60.94%	2,072	35.54%	205	3.52%
1928	4,359	75.09%	1,397	24.07%	49	0.84%
1932	3,957	54.34%	3,107	42.67%	218	2.99%
1936	4,630	59.35%	3,093	39.65%	78	1.00%
1940	4,966	65.32%	2,637	34.68%	0	0.00%
1944	4,309	72.13%	1,665	27.87%	0	0.00%
1948	3,480	65.96%	1,783	33.79%	13	0.25%
1952	4,303	71.94%	1,678	28.06%	0	0.00%
1956	4,134	73.82%	1,466	26.18%	0	0.00%
1960	4,424	70.82%	1,823	29.18%	0	0.00%
1964	2,281	42.76%	3,053	57.24%	0	0.00%
1968	3,030	57.51%	1,789	33.95%	450	8.54%
1972	3,679	68.50%	1,554	28.93%	138	2.57%
1976	2,971	51.14%	2,727	46.94%	111	1.91%
1980	3,236	60.31%	1,875	34.94%	255	4.75%
1984	3,994	67.66%	1,868	31.64%	41	0.69%
1988	3,713	63.37%	2,085	35.59%	61	1.04%
1992	2,719	40.54%	2,402	35.81%	1,586	23.65%
1996	2,566	42.97%	2,385	39.94%	1,020	17.08%
2000	3,451	57.58%	2,261	37.73%	281	4.69%
2004	3,758	56.06%	2,875	42.89%	70	1.04%
2008	3,440	51.96%	2,966	44.80%	214	3.23%
2012	3,179	51.81%	2,814	45.86%	143	2.33%
2016	4,431	68.41%	1,736	26.80%	310	4.79%
2020	5,041	73.53%	1,725	25.16%	90	1.31%
2024	5,168	75.97%	1,560	22.93%	75	1.10%

United States Senate election results for Morgan County, Ohio1
Year	Republican		Democratic		Third party(ies)	
Year	No.	%	No.	%	No.	%
2024	4,587	69.07%	1,802	27.13%	252	3.79%

== Transportation ==
The Morgan County Airport is located three nautical miles (3.5 mi; 5.6 km) east of McConnelsville's central business district.

== Communities ==
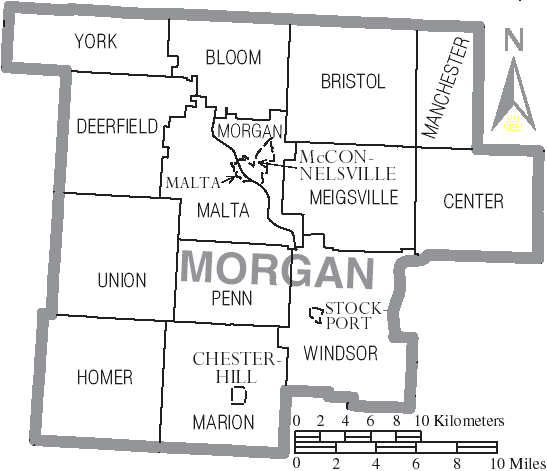
Map of Morgan County, Ohio with municipal and township labels

=== Villages ===
- Chesterhill
- Malta
- McConnelsville (county seat)
- Stockport

=== Townships ===
- Bloom
- Bristol
- Center
- Deerfield
- Homer
- Malta
- Manchester
- Marion
- Meigsville
- Morgan
- Penn
- Union
- Windsor
- York

=== Census-designated place ===
- Rose Farm

=== Unincorporated communities ===
- Bishopville
- Bristol
- Deavertown
- Eagleport
- Hooksburg
- Joy
- Morganville
- Moscow Mills
- Pennsville
- Plantsville
- Reinersville
- Ringgold
- Rokeby Lock
- Rosseau
- Roxbury
- Todds
- Triadelphia
- Unionville

== See also ==
- National Register of Historic Places listings in Morgan County, Ohio
