= Homer Township, Morgan County, Ohio =

Township in Ohio, US

- Township
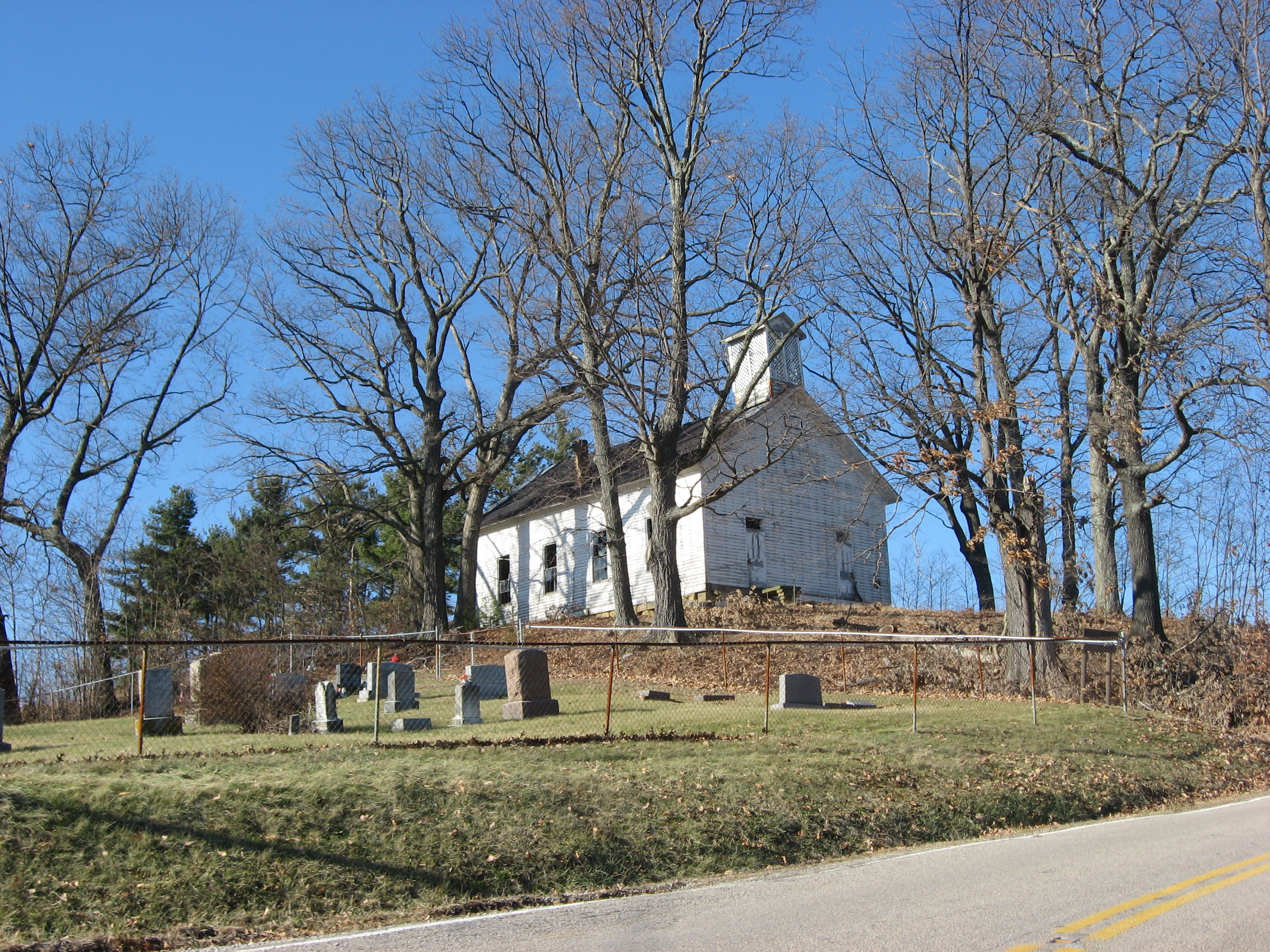
- Pleasant Hill Methodist Church and Cemetery

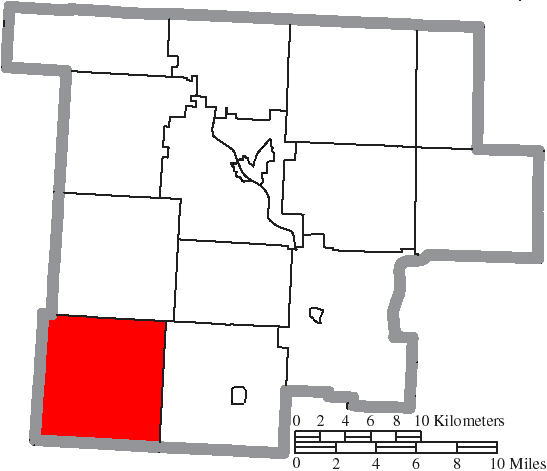
- Location of Homer Township in Morgan County
- Coordinates: 39°29′58″N 82°0′52″W
- Country: United States
- State: Ohio
- County: Morgan

Area
  - Total: 38.3 sq mi (99.2 km^{2})
  - Land: 37.7 sq mi (97.7 km^{2})
  - Water: 0.58 sq mi (1.5 km^{2})
- Elevation: 810 ft (247 m)

Population (2020)
  - Total: 1,006
  - Density: 26.7/sq mi (10.3/km^{2})
- Time zone: UTC-5 (Eastern (EST))
  - Summer (DST): UTC-4 (EDT)
- FIPS code: 39-36092
- GNIS feature ID: 1086687

Homer Township is one of the fourteen townships of Morgan County, Ohio, United States. The 2020 census found 1,006 people in the township.

== Geography ==
Located in the southwestern corner of the county, it borders the following townships:

- Union Township - north
- Marion Township - east
- Bern Township, Athens County - southeast corner
- Ames Township, Athens County - south
- Dover Township, Athens County - southwest corner
- Trimble Township, Athens County - west
- Monroe Township, Perry County - northwest

No municipalities are located in Homer Township.

== Name and history ==
Statewide, the only other Homer Township is located in Medina County.

== Government ==
The township is governed by a three-member board of trustees, who are elected in November of odd-numbered years to a four-year term beginning on the following January 1. Two are elected in the year after the presidential election and one is elected in the year before it. There is also an elected township fiscal officer, who serves a four-year term beginning on April 1 of the year after the election, which is held in November of the year before the presidential election. Vacancies in the fiscal officership or on the board of trustees are filled by the remaining trustees.
