= National Register of Historic Places listings in Muskingum County, Ohio =

Location of Muskingum County in Ohio

This is a list of the National Register of Historic Places listings in Muskingum County, Ohio.

This is intended to be a complete list of the properties and districts on the National Register of Historic Places in Muskingum County, Ohio, United States. Latitude and longitude coordinates are provided for many National Register properties and districts; these locations may be seen together in an online map.

There are 84 properties and districts listed on the National Register in the county. Another 5 properties were once listed but have been removed.

This National Park Service list is complete through NPS recent listings posted April 10, 2026.

== Current listings ==
	Name on the Register	Image	Date listed	Location	City or town	Description
1	Adams-Gray House	Adams-Gray House	December 5, 1979 (#79001797)	Southeast of Trinway on Tobacco Hill Rd.ja; 40°09′31″N 81°56′54″W	Cass Township	Extends into Virginia Township in Coshocton County
2	George W. Adams House		November 29, 1979 (#79001912)	South of Trinway on Bottom Rd. 40°07′54″N 82°00′57″W	Cass Township	Demolished in 2013.
3	Adena Court Apartments	Adena Court Apartments	September 27, 1980 (#80003190)	41 S. 4th St. 39°56′22″N 82°00′29″W	Zanesville	
4	Alameda Apartments	Alameda Apartments	June 17, 1982 (#82003623)	7th St. 39°56′40″N 82°00′15″W	Zanesville	
5	Arlington Hotel	Arlington Hotel	December 16, 1982 (#82001482)	722 Main St. 39°56′24″N 82°00′14″W	Zanesville	Destroyed
6	Baker Brothers Wholesale Grocery		June 1, 2023 (#100009004)	8-12 East Main St. 39°54′11″N 82°01′11″W	Zanesville	
7	Baughman Memorial Park		August 27, 1979 (#79001909)	West of Frazeysburg on State Route 586; 40°06′41″N 82°10′37″W	Jackson Township	The park, home to sandstone statues sculpted by local artist Brice Baughman, was sold in February 2008 and resold six months later, at that time twelve of the statues were individually sold.
8	Belt Line and New York Central Freight House	Belt Line and New York Central Freight House	March 24, 1983 (#83002015)	3rd and Market Sts. 39°56′32″N 82°00′33″W	Zanesville	
9	Black-Elliott Block	Black-Elliott Block	May 8, 1979 (#79001914)	525 Main St. 39°56′25″N 82°00′21″W	Zanesville	
10	Blocksom-Rolls House	Blocksom-Rolls House	February 21, 1979 (#79001915)	960 Eastman St. 39°56′34″N 81°59′59″W	Zanesville	
11	Charles Brendel House	Charles Brendel House	November 25, 1980 (#80003191)	427 Wayne Ave. 39°56′02″N 82°00′10″W	Zanesville	
12	Brighton-Dryden Historic District	Brighton-Dryden Historic District	June 1, 1982 (#82003624)	Dryden Rd., Brighton Boulevard, and Lexington and Stanberry Aves. 39°55′47″N 82°01′21″W	Zanesville	
13	Buckingham-Petty House		August 11, 1980 (#80003182)	Mound Rd. 39°52′51″N 81°54′49″W	Wayne Township	
14	Nicholas Christman House	Nicholas Christman House	May 22, 1978 (#78002159)	532 Wayne Ave. 39°55′51″N 82°00′05″W	Zanesville	
15	Howard Chandler Christy Art Studio	Howard Chandler Christy Art Studio	June 15, 2011 (#11000368)	6020 S. River Rd., north of Blue Rock; 39°51′22″N 81°53′52″W	Wayne Township	1908-1909 estate of Howard Chandler Christy; also known as The Barracks
16	Clossman Hardware Store	Clossman Hardware Store	November 25, 1980 (#80003192)	621-623 Main St. 39°56′24″N 82°00′18″W	Zanesville	
17	Crescent Hill	Crescent Hill	January 9, 1986 (#86000034)	44 W. 5th St. 40°07′23″N 82°00′57″W	Dresden	
18	William Denison House	William Denison House	April 29, 1982 (#82003620)	7115 Adamsville Rd. (State Route 93), south of Adamsville; 40°03′08″N 81°53′35″W	Salem Township	
19	Downtown Zanesville Historic District		February 15, 2024 (#100009926)	Roughly bounded by 3rd, Market, 7th, and South streets 39°56′24″N 82°00′23″W	Zanesville	
20	Dresden Suspension Bridge	Dresden Suspension Bridge	December 1, 1978 (#78002153)	State Routes 208 and 666; 40°07′14″N 82°00′01″W	Dresden and Madison Township	
21	Factory Site	Factory Site	March 11, 1980 (#80003183)	Along Moxahala Creek in Ironspot; 39°49′13″N 82°03′51″W	Newton Township	
22	Fairmont Avenue Historic District	Fairmont Avenue Historic District	November 30, 1982 (#82001483)	Fairmont Ave. 39°57′31″N 82°00′47″W	Zanesville	
23	Five Mile House		April 11, 1977 (#77001081)	South of Zanesville off U.S. Route 22; 39°52′55″N 82°03′32″W	Newton Township	
24	James Galigher House	James Galigher House	February 22, 1979 (#79001916)	South of Zanesville on S. River Rd. 39°53′55″N 81°59′56″W	Wayne Township	
25	John Glenn Boyhood Home	John Glenn Boyhood Home	December 10, 2018 (#100003210)	72 W. Main St. 39°59′37″N 81°44′11″W	New Concord	
26	Ernest J. Gorsuch House	Ernest J. Gorsuch House	March 11, 1980 (#80003193)	1869 Norwood Boulevard; 39°57′47″N 82°00′19″W	Zanesville	
27	Ralph Hardesty Stone House	Ralph Hardesty Stone House	March 11, 1980 (#80003184)	Main St. 39°59′08″N 81°47′24″W	Norwich	
28	William Rainey Harper Log House	William Rainey Harper Log House	April 6, 1978 (#78002154)	E. Main St. 39°59′38″N 81°44′05″W	New Concord	
29	Harper-Cosgrave Block	Harper-Cosgrave Block	January 3, 1980 (#80003195)	62 N. 3rd St. 39°56′30″N 82°00′32″W	Zanesville	
30	William B. Harris House	William B. Harris House	May 22, 1978 (#78002161)	1320 Newman Dr. 39°56′24″N 81°59′28″W	Zanesville	
31	Headley Inn, Smith House and Farm	Headley Inn, Smith House and Farm	April 26, 1978 (#78002162)	5255 West Pike; 39°57′14″N 82°05′39″W	Falls Township	
32	James Hunter Stone House		January 3, 1980 (#80003181)	East of Adamsville on Mercer Rd. 40°05′35″N 81°48′15″W	Monroe Township	
33	Johnston-Crossland House	Johnston-Crossland House	March 15, 1982 (#82003625)	N. 7th St. 39°56′36″N 82°00′15″W	Zanesville	Destroyed
34	George and Edward Kearns Houses	George and Edward Kearns Houses	February 2, 1979 (#79001917)	306 and 320 Luck Ave. 39°56′07″N 82°01′05″W	Zanesville	The Kearns-Hale House at 320 Luck Ave was destroyed between August & September 2009, The Kearns-Seabach House at 306 Luck Ave still stands.
35	Lafayette Lodge No. 79	Lafayette Lodge No. 79	September 13, 1978 (#78002163)	333 Market St. 39°56′32″N 82°00′28″W	Zanesville	
36	William D. Lash House	William D. Lash House	February 17, 1978 (#78002164)	2261 Dresden Rd. 39°57′56″N 82°00′23″W	Zanesville	
37	Lilienthal Building	Lilienthal Building	July 21, 1980 (#80003196)	44 S. 6th St. 39°56′20″N 82°00′20″W	Zanesville	
38	Locust Site (33MU160)	Locust Site (33MU160)	August 1, 1985 (#85001696)	On a terrace along the Licking River east of Nashport; 40°03′25″N 82°09′22″W	Licking Township	
39	Masonic Temple Building	Masonic Temple Building	May 25, 1990 (#90000756)	36-42 N. 4th St. 39°56′27″N 82°00′25″W	Zanesville	Destroyed by fire in January 2022.
40	Harry S. McClelland House	Harry S. McClelland House	September 27, 1980 (#80003197)	908 Laurel Ave. 39°57′15″N 82°00′55″W	Zanesville	
41	McCully Log House		March 15, 1982 (#82003622)	North of New Concord on Wharton Lane; 40°05′21″N 81°44′55″W	Monroe Township	
42	McIntire Terrace Historic District	McIntire Terrace Historic District	September 6, 1979 (#79001918)	Roughly bounded by Peter Alley, McIntire, Moorehead, Findley, Blue, and Adair Aves. 39°57′03″N 82°00′47″W	Zanesville	
43	Mound House	Mound House	June 6, 1979 (#79001908)	400 Mound Rd. 39°52′47″N 81°54′41″W	Wayne Township	
44	Mount Zion Presbyterian Church		December 19, 1978 (#78002152)	Southeast of Chandlersville off State Route 146; 39°51′45″N 81°44′59″W	Rich Hill Township	
45	Muskingum College Campus Historic District	Muskingum College Campus Historic District	June 11, 1979 (#79001910)	U.S. Route 22; also roughly bounded by Stormont St. & College, Lakeside, and Stadium Drs. 39°59′47″N 81°44′09″W	New Concord	Second set of addresses represent a boundary increase approved March 29, 2021.
46	Muskingum County Courthouse and Jail	Muskingum County Courthouse and Jail	July 16, 1973 (#73001515)	4th and Main Sts. 39°56′26″N 82°00′26″W	Zanesville	
47	Muskingum River Lock No. 10 and Canal	Muskingum River Lock No. 10 and Canal	December 19, 1978 (#78002165)	Northern bank of the Muskingum River, north of the railroad bridge south to the lock terminals 39°56′02″N 82°00′11″W	Zanesville	
48	Muskingum River Navigation Historic District	Muskingum River Navigation Historic District	February 9, 2007 (#07000025)	Coshocton, Muskingum, Morgan, Washington Counties; 40°09′27″N 81°56′41″W	Numerous jurisdictions	
49	Nashport Mound		May 24, 1973 (#73001512)	Along the Licking River below Nashport; 40°03′37″N 82°09′57″W	Licking Township	
50	New Concord-Union High School		March 11, 2024 (#100010018)	4 Stormont Street; 39°59′39″N 81°44′16″W	New Concord	
51	Ohio Power Company	Ohio Power Company	November 25, 1980 (#80003198)	604 Main St. 39°56′24″N 82°00′18″W	Zanesville	
52	Paul Hall, Muskingum College	Paul Hall, Muskingum College	April 23, 1973 (#73001514)	Layton Dr., Muskingum College campus 39°59′43″N 81°44′04″W	New Concord	
53	Peairs Homestead		February 27, 1979 (#79001919)	East of Zanesville on State Route 146; 39°54′45″N 81°53′44″W	Salt Creek Township	
54	Philo II Archeological District		November 29, 1978 (#78002156)	Western side of the Muskingum River below Philo; 39°48′42″N 81°54′04″W	Harrison Township	
55	Pioneer School		March 24, 2023 (#100008741)	952 East Main St. 39°56′23″N 82°00′05″W	Zanesville	
56	Pittsburg, Cincinnati, and St. Louis Depot	Pittsburg, Cincinnati, and St. Louis Depot	March 24, 1983 (#83002016)	Market St. 39°56′34″N 82°00′36″W	Zanesville	
57	Prospect Place	Prospect Place	May 10, 1979 (#79001913)	South of Trinway on State Route 60; 40°08′05″N 82°00′42″W	Cass Township	
58	Putnam Historic District	Putnam Historic District	June 30, 1975 (#75001511)	Bounded by the former Penn Central Railroad tracks, Van Buren St., and the Muskingum River; 39°55′55″N 82°00′26″W	Zanesville	
59	C.W. Ransbottom House	C.W. Ransbottom House	March 11, 1980 (#80003185)	291 Washington St. 39°48′35″N 82°04′16″W	Roseville	Destroyed per Google Street View.
60	Edward Ransbottom House	Edward Ransbottom House	March 11, 1980 (#80003186)	99 Main St. 39°48′22″N 82°04′22″W	Roseville	
61	Frank M. Ransbottom House	Frank M. Ransbottom House	March 11, 1980 (#80003187)	289 Washington St. 39°48′35″N 82°04′16″W	Roseville	Destroyed per Google Street View.
62	Mort Ransbottom House	Mort Ransbottom House	March 11, 1980 (#80003188)	152 N. Main St. 39°48′25″N 82°04′20″W	Roseville	
63	Adam Rider House	Adam Rider House	November 29, 1979 (#79001911)	9350 Athens Rd., south of Roseville; 39°47′43″N 82°03′47″W	Clay Township	
64	Roseville High School	Roseville High School	March 30, 1978 (#78002157)	Stokeley and Perry Sts. 39°48′36″N 82°04′24″W	Roseville	
65	"S" Bridge II	"S" Bridge II	April 23, 1973 (#73001513)	U.S. Route 40 west of New Concord; 39°59′35″N 81°44′48″W	Union Township	
66	St. James Episcopal Church	St. James Episcopal Church	October 2, 1978 (#78002167)	155 N. 6th St. 39°56′35″N 82°00′20″W	Zanesville	
67	St. John's Evangelical Lutheran Church	St. John's Evangelical Lutheran Church	January 3, 1980 (#80003189)	South of Stovertown on State Route 555; 39°49′59″N 81°59′17″W	Brush Creek Township	
68	St. John's Lutheran Church	St. John's Lutheran Church	December 2, 1982 (#82001484)	Market and N. 7th Sts. 39°56′31″N 82°00′15″W	Zanesville	
69	St. Nicholas's Catholic Church	St. Nicholas's Catholic Church	September 25, 1975 (#75001512)	925 Main St. 39°56′24″N 82°00′04″W	Zanesville	
70	St. Thomas Aquinas Church	St. Thomas Aquinas Church	March 11, 1980 (#80003199)	130 N. 5th St. 39°56′35″N 82°00′24″W	Zanesville	
71	Salt Creek Covered Bridge	Salt Creek Covered Bridge	September 10, 1974 (#74001587)	3 mi (4.8 km) northwest of Norwich; 39°59′55″N 81°50′24″W	Perry Township	
72	Frederick Augustus Seborn House	Frederick Augustus Seborn House	April 4, 1978 (#78002166)	1115-1119 Maysville Pike; 39°55′15″N 82°00′36″W	Zanesville	
73	William R. Smith House	William R. Smith House	June 1, 1982 (#82003627)	920 Marietta St. 39°56′10″N 82°00′09″W	Zanesville	Demolished
74	David Stormont House	David Stormont House	April 21, 1983 (#83002017)	103 W. Main St. 39°59′37″N 81°44′18″W	New Concord	
75	Capt. James Boggs Tannehill House	Capt. James Boggs Tannehill House	August 27, 1979 (#79001921)	367 Taylor St. 39°58′03″N 82°00′15″W	Zanesville	
76	William C. Tanner House		September 17, 1979 (#79001922)	Northwest of Zanesville; 39°59′49″N 82°05′53″W	Falls Township	
77	Tavener-Sears Tavern	Tavener-Sears Tavern	April 29, 1982 (#82003621)	Main St. in Mount Sterling; 39°57′25″N 82°09′02″W	Hopewell Township	
78	US Post Office and Federal Building-Zanesville	US Post Office and Federal Building-Zanesville	February 11, 1988 (#88000071)	65 S. 5th St. 39°56′21″N 82°00′25″W	Zanesville	Designed by architect George F. Hammond
79	West Union School	West Union School	March 30, 1978 (#78002155)	South of Norwich on County Road 200; 39°56′56″N 81°47′59″W	Union Township	
80	West View	West View	March 5, 1982 (#82003628)	444 Sunkel Boulevard; 39°57′50″N 82°00′25″W	Zanesville	
81	Perry Wiles Grocery Company	Perry Wiles Grocery Company	November 25, 1980 (#80003200)	32-36 N. 3rd St. 39°56′27″N 82°00′32″W	Zanesville	
82	Y Bridge	Y Bridge	November 2, 1973 (#73001516)	At the foot of Main St., over the Licking and Muskingum rivers 39°56′25″N 82°00′48″W	Zanesville	
83	Zanesville YMCA	Zanesville YMCA	October 29, 1985 (#83002018)	34 S. 5th St. 39°56′20″N 82°00′24″W	Zanesville	Destroyed
84	Zanesville YWCA	Zanesville YWCA	July 17, 1978 (#78002168)	49 N. 6th St. 39°56′28″N 82°00′20″W	Zanesville	

== Former listings ==
	Name on the Register	Image	Date listed	Date removed	Location	City or town	Description
1	Achauer-Linser House and Brewery Complex		August 3, 1978 (#78002158)	October 29, 1985	976-988 E. Main Street; 39°56′23″N 81°59′54″W	Zanesville	Demolished in June 1982.
2	Abram Emery House	Abram Emery House	December 6, 1978 (#78002160)	May 12, 2016	413 Pershing Rd. 39°55′31″N 82°00′43″W	Zanesville	Destroyed
3	Grant School		November 25, 1980 (#80003194)	January 31, 1995	Off U.S. Route 22; 39°55′07″N 82°00′23″W	Zanesville	
4	Lind Arcade	Lind Arcade	June 1, 1982 (#82003626)	January 31, 1995	48 N. 5th Street; 39°56′25″N 82°00′22″W	Zanesville	Demolished in July 1993.
5	St. Paul's A.M.E. Church and Parsonage		July 17, 1979 (#79001920)	May 7, 1990	331 South Street; 39°56′19″N 82°00′32″W	Zanesville	

== See also ==
- List of National Historic Landmarks in Ohio
- Listings in neighboring counties: Coshocton, Guernsey, Licking, Morgan, Noble, Perry
- National Register of Historic Places listings in Ohio
