= Westview =

Westview may refer to:

== Places ==
=== Canada ===
- Westview Village, Edmonton, a neighbourhood
- Westview, British Columbia, a community and ferry terminal
- Westview, Saskatoon, a neighbourhood
- Westview, Saskatchewan

=== United States ===
- Westview, Florida
- Westview, Atlanta, Georgia, a historic neighborhood southwest of downtown
- Westview, Illinois
- Westview, Maryland, a suburb of Baltimore
- Westview (Brookneal, Virginia), a historic plantation house and farm

== Media ==
- Westview (album), a 2011 album by Monkey Majik
- Westview Press, an American academic publisher
- Westview, New Jersey, a fictional town in the Marvel Cinematic Universe

== See also ==
- West View (disambiguation)
- Westview High School (disambiguation)
- Westview School (disambiguation)
