= West View =

West View can refer to:

== Places ==
=== England ===
- West View, County Durham, England

=== United States ===
Cities, towns, etc.

- West View, New Jersey
- West View, Pennsylvania
- West View, Milwaukee, Wisconsin

Places on the National Register of Historic Places:

- West View (Zanesville, Ohio)

== Ships ==
- USS West View (1918), also spelled Westview, a United States Navy cargo ship in commission from 1918 to 1919

== See also ==
- Westview (disambiguation)
