= Salt Creek (Muskingum County, Ohio) =

Coordinates: 39°52′0″N 81°54′0″W

Salt Creek is a stream located entirely within Muskingum County, Ohio.

Salt Creek was so named for the salt production there by pioneer settlers.

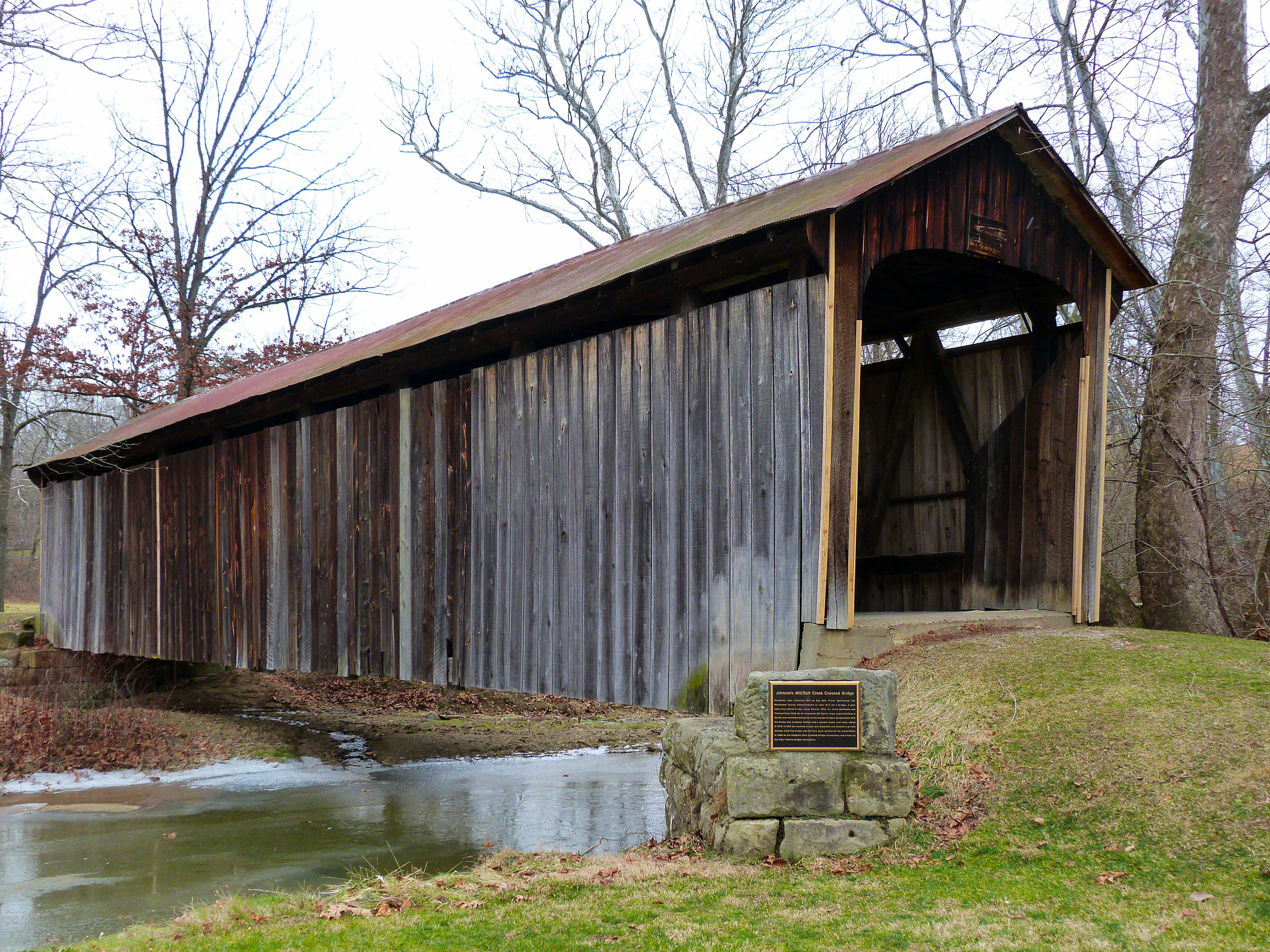
2011

It is spanned by the Salt Creek Covered Bridge.

== See also ==
- List of rivers of Ohio
- Muskingum Salt Reservations
