= Salt Creek Covered Bridge =

- U.S. National Register of Historic Places
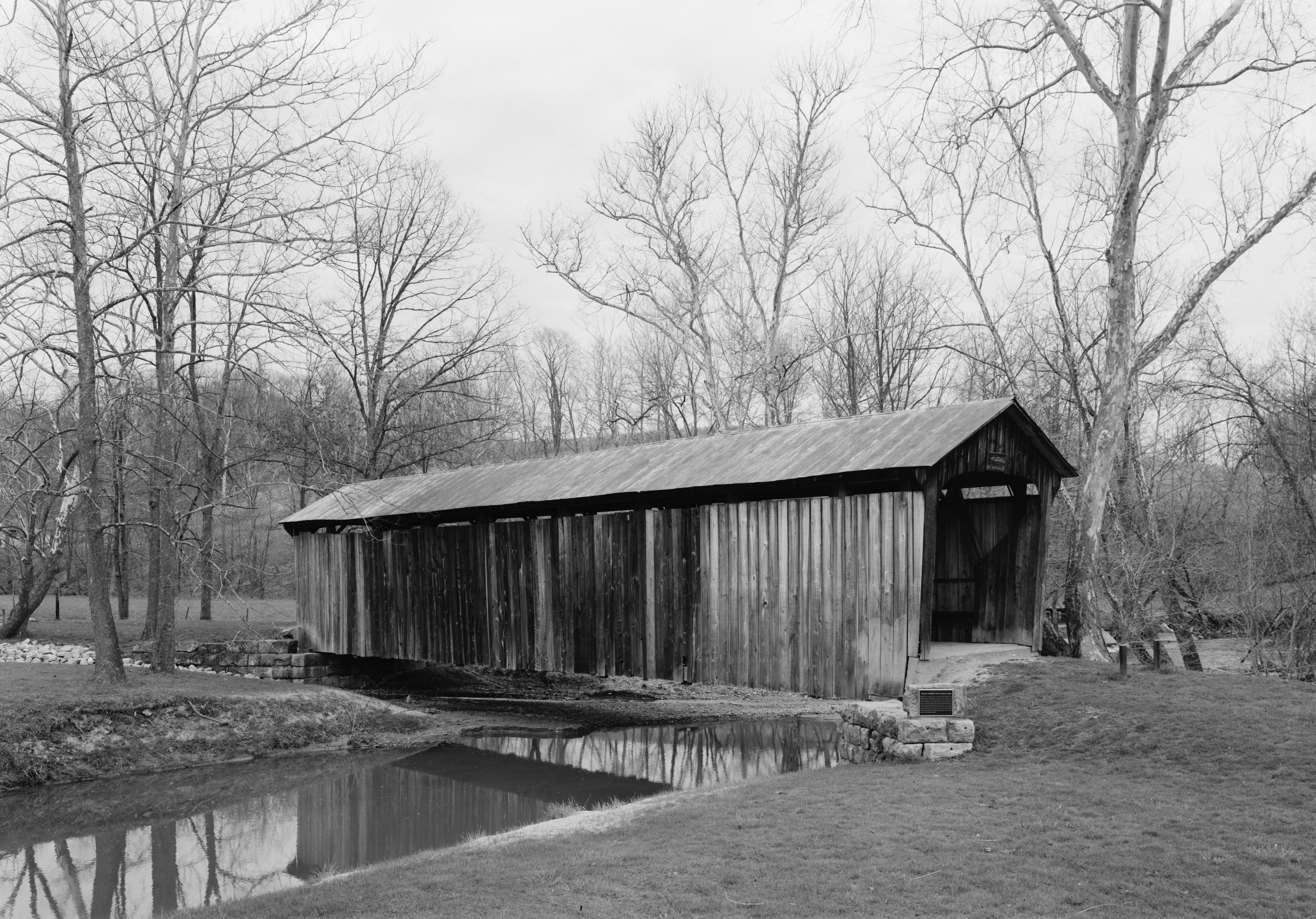

- Location within Ohio
- Nearest city: Norwich, Ohio
- Coordinates: 39°59′57″N 81°50′23″W
- Area: less than one acre
- Built: 1876
- Built by: Fisher, Thomas; Romine, Jesse
- Architectural style: Warren truss
- NRHP reference No.: 74001587
- Added to NRHP: September 10, 1974

The Salt Creek Covered Bridge, near Norwich in Perry Township, Muskingum County, Ohio, was built in 1876. It was listed on the National Register of Historic Places in 1974.

It is located 3 miles (4.8 km) northwest of Norwich.

It spans Salt Creek about 10 miles (16 km) east of Zanesville, Ohio and is a Warren truss bridge.

== See also ==
- List of bridges documented by the Historic American Engineering Record in Ohio
