= West Union School =

- U.S. National Register of Historic Places
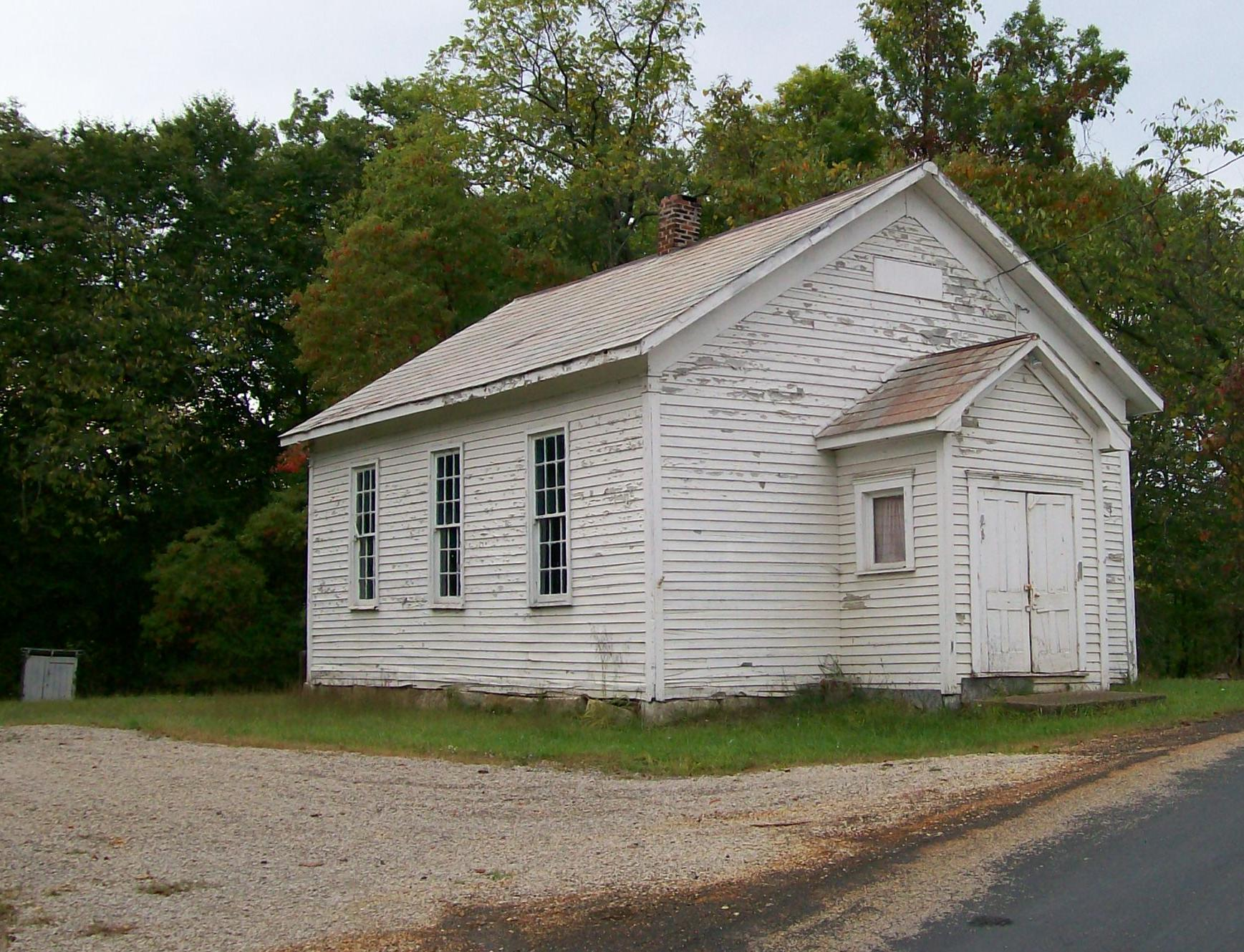
- Front and side of the school

- Location within Ohio Location within the United States
- Nearest city: Norwich, Ohio
- Coordinates: 39°56′56″N 81°47′59″W
- Area: Less than 1 acre (0.40 ha)
- Built: 1858
- NRHP reference No.: 78002155
- Added to NRHP: March 30, 1978

The West Union School is a historic one-room school located near the village of Norwich in eastern Muskingum County, Ohio, United States. Situated along County Road 200 south of the village, the school was erected in 1858. It replaced an earlier log school building; both structures occupied land on the property of pioneer farmer George Richey.

The school is a weatherboarded building, constructed on a foundation of sandstone and covered with a slate roof; additionally, it features brick details. It features a simple rectangular floor plan, measuring 35 feet (11 m) long and 25 feet (7.6 m) wide. Although now over 150 years old, the school remains in fine condition; it is believed to have been preserved better than any other extant one-room school in the area.

Classes met in the West Union School from its completion in 1858 until the fall of 1933, at which time the West Union School District united with other Union Township districts to merge with the New Concord school system. Since that time, the school has served as a community center: it has hosted events for religious groups, musicians' and farmers' organizations, and even a debate club. In early 1978, the West Union School was listed on the National Register of Historic Places, qualifying both because of its historically significant architecture and because of its role in local history.
