= Ralph Hardesty Stone House =

Historic house in Ohio, United States

- U.S. National Register of Historic Places
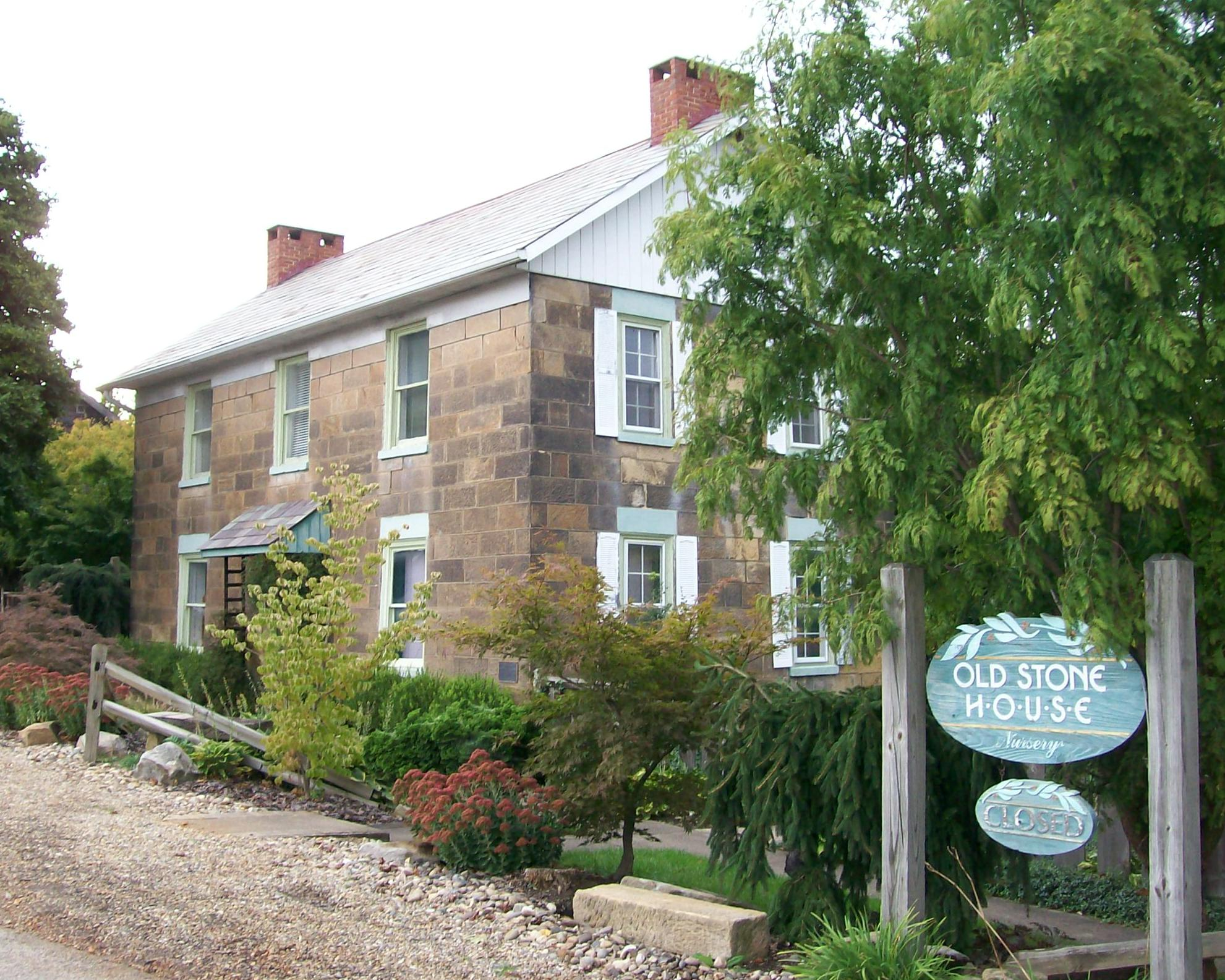
- Front and side of house in 2009

- Location within Ohio Location within the United States
- Location: Main St., Norwich, Ohio
- Coordinates: 39°59′8″N 81°47′24″W
- Area: less than 1 acre (0.40 ha)
- Built: 1836
- NRHP reference No.: 80003184
- Added to NRHP: 11 March 1980

The Ralph Hardesty Stone House is a historic house located on Main Street in Norwich, Ohio.

== Description and history ==
The house is a two-story stone building with a slate gable roof. The facade on the south has three bays with the door in the center bay. The original house was 40 by 22 feet (12.2 by 6.7 m). The native sandstone used in construction is dressed and shows numerous tooling marks. The west gable end of the building show evidence an addition might have been attached there. This is supported by early tax records describing a "stone and brick" house. The interior retains much of the original design with an open two run stairway off a central hall. The stairway has a plain railing and delicate square balusters. Original woodwork including window and door molding and chair rails is largely intact. Built in 1836 the house was placed on the National Register on March 11, 1980.

== See also ==
- Glossary of architecture
- History of Ohio
