= Westview High School =

Westview High School is the name of several high schools in the United States:

- Westview High School (Arizona), in Avondale, Arizona
- Westview High School (Beaverton, Oregon), near Portland, Oregon
- Westview High School (Indiana), in LaGrange County, Indiana
- Westview High School (San Diego), in San Diego, California
- Westview High School (Idaho Falls), in Idaho Falls, Idaho
- Westview High School (Tennessee), in Martin, Tennessee
- Omaha Westview High School, in Bennington, Nebraska
