= Perry Wiles Grocery Company =

- U.S. National Register of Historic Places
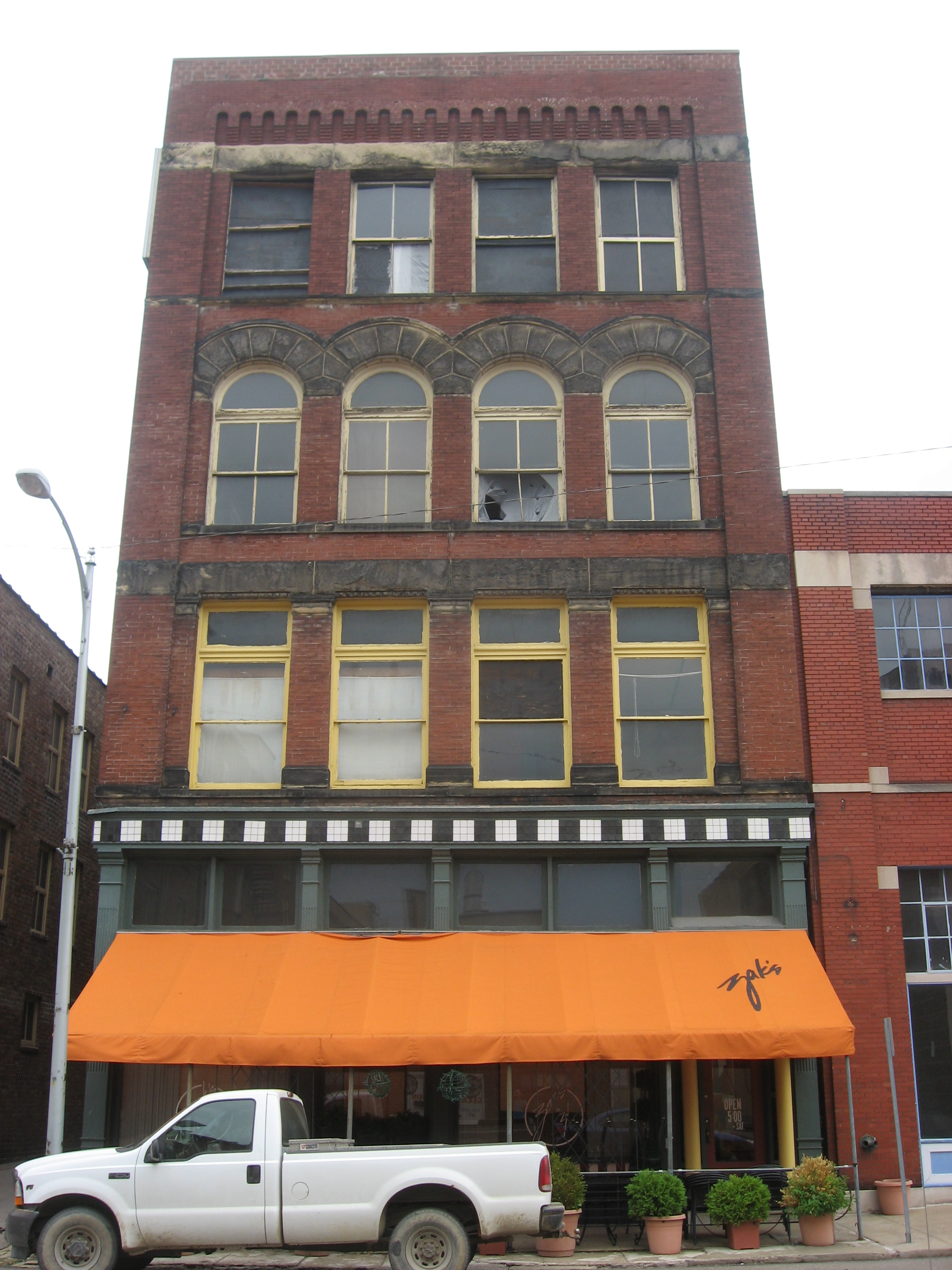
- Front of the building

- Location within Ohio Location within the United States
- Location: 32-36 N. 3rd St., Zanesville, Ohio
- Coordinates: 39°56′27″N 82°0′32″W
- Area: Less than 1 acre (0.40 ha)
- Built: 1892
- Architect: H.C. Lindsay; E.L. Winchell
- Architectural style: Romanesque Revival
- NRHP reference No.: 80003200
- Added to NRHP: November 25, 1980

The Perry Wiles Grocery Company is a historic commercial building in downtown Zanesville, Ohio, United States. Unlike many similar contemporary buildings in the city, it has survived to the present day relatively unchanged, and it has consequently been designated a historic site.

When he erected the present building in 1892, Perry Wiles was the owner of one of five grocery wholesalers active in the city of Zanesville, and he and his competitors supplied more than one hundred different individual retail-level grocery stores in the city. Finding the construction of a new building necessary in the early 1890s, Wiles arranged for the services of leading local architect Henry C. Lindsay. The resulting design is a four-story building, built of brick on a stone foundation and finished with details of stone and brick. Although it features some modern elements, such as a cast-iron storefront, the building remains an obvious example of the Romanesque Revival style of architecture. Located adjacent to the original building's southern side is a smaller addition, which was constructed in 1914.

By 1980, the Wiles Company had closed, along with all four of its competitors: these firms lost their business when their retailing customers closed, driven out of business by the advent of large supermarket chains. Since that time, the Wiles Company property has been converted into an eating establishment, Zak's Restaurant. In late 1980, the Wiles Company building was listed on the National Register of Historic Places, qualifying because of its place in local history and because of its historically significant architecture. While the headquarters of the five grocery wholesalers may not have been significantly different in their heyday, the passage of time has greatly changed their appearance: the other buildings have all been destroyed or heavily modified, leaving the Wiles Block as Zanesville's only grocery wholesaler building that retains the appearance of a century before.
