= St. John's Lutheran Church (Zanesville, Ohio) =

Historic church in Ohio, United States

- U.S. National Register of Historic Places
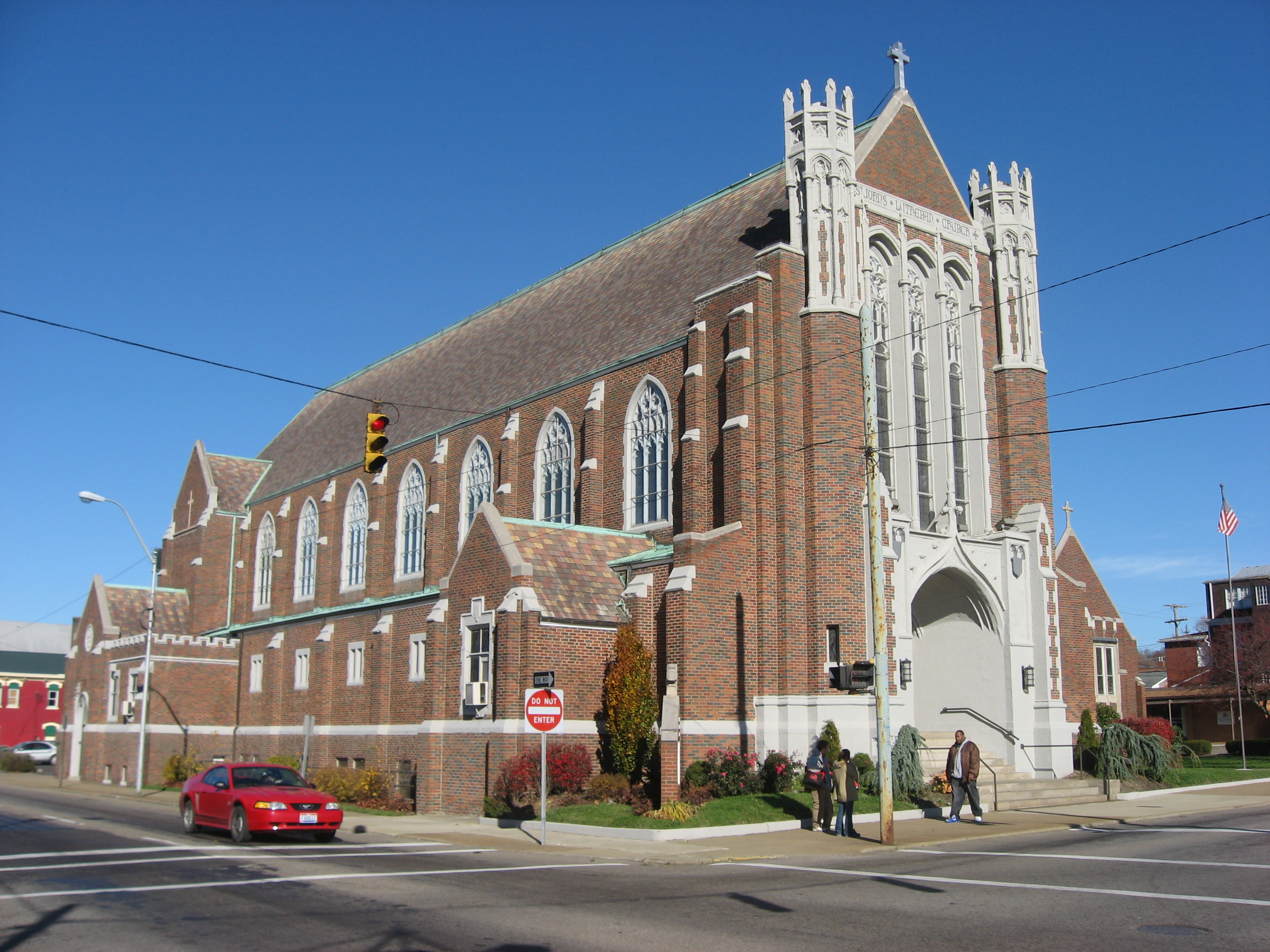

- Location within Ohio Location within the United States
- Location: Market and N. 7th Sts., Zanesville, Ohio
- Coordinates: 39°56′31″N 82°0′15″W
- Area: less than one acre
- Built: 1926
- Architect: E. Mast & Sons; Corbusier, Lensky,&Foster
- Architectural style: Late Gothic Revival
- NRHP reference No.: 82001484
- Added to NRHP: December 2, 1982

St. John's Lutheran Church is a historic church at Market and N. 7th Streets in Zanesville, Ohio.

It was built in 1926 and added to the National Register in 1982.

The church is a place of worship for practicers of Lutheranism
