= St. Nicholas Catholic Church (Zanesville, Ohio) =

Historic church in Ohio, United States

- St. Nicholas's Catholic Church
- U.S. National Register of Historic Places
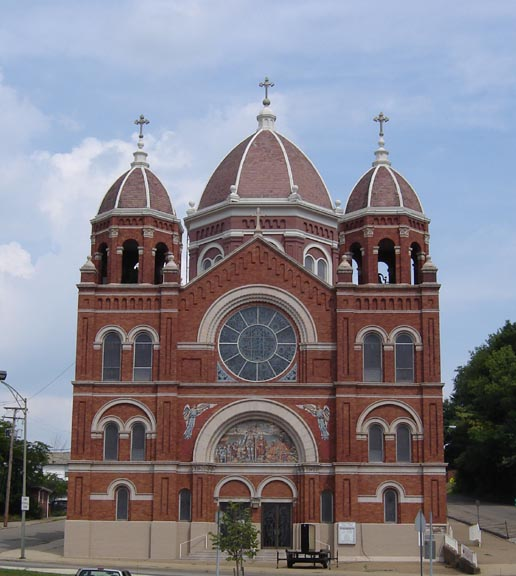
- St. Nicholas Catholic Church

- Location within Ohio
- Location: 925 Main St., Zanesville, Ohio
- Coordinates: 39.94006°N 82.00115°W
- Area: 0 acres (0 ha)
- Built: 1899
- Architect: Shilffarth, Mr. Frank; Et al.
- Architectural style: Romanesque Revival
- NRHP reference No.: 75001512
- Added to NRHP: September 25, 1975

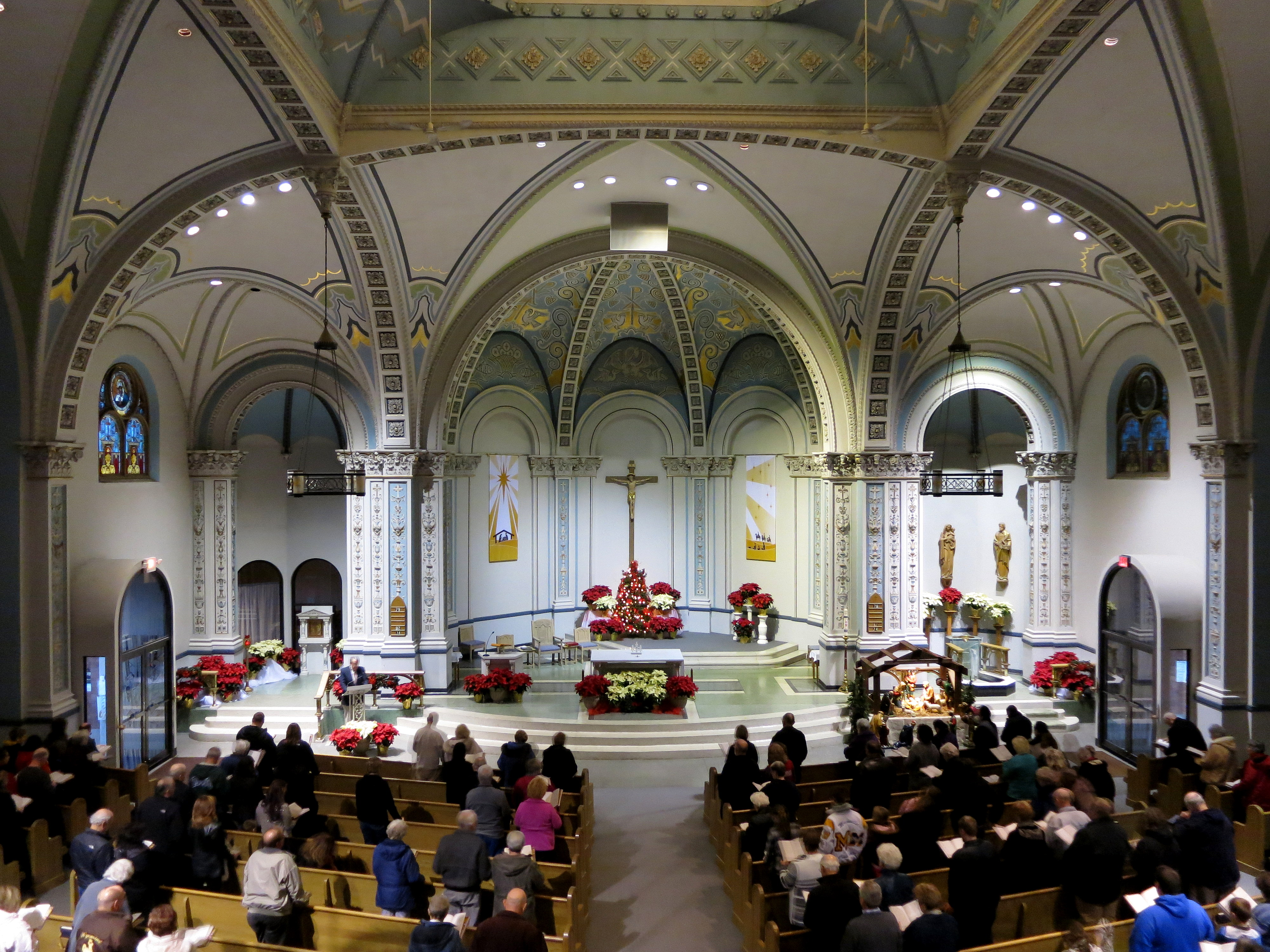
The nave decorated for Christmas as seen just before the celebration of Mass.

St. Nicholas Catholic Church is an historic church of the Roman Catholic Diocese of Columbus located in Zanesville, Ohio. The parish was founded in 1836 to serve the German Catholics of the area. The current Romanesque Revival church was dedicated in 1899 and added to the National Register of Historic Places in 1975.

== History ==
=== Early years ===
The first Mass celebrated in Zanesville was celebrated by Dominican Fr. Nicholas Young, who was traveling through the area to Perry County. However, upon discovering three Catholic families in the area, he said Mass on the second floor of the Green Tree Tavern, which stood at the corner of Fifth and Main Streets in the spring of 1819. A church was acquired to serve the Catholic population in the area in 1820, and in 1827 another, larger, building was constructed to serve the growing population in the area, later becoming St. Thomas Aquinas Church, serving the Irish-American population of the area. In 1836, the German-speaking population gained permission from bishop John Purcell to establish their own parish, placing it under the patronage of Saint Nicholas, and building a church where the current rectory stands. Fr. Joseph Gallagher, a missionary priest from the Roman Catholic Archdiocese of Munich was appointed the first pastor. The church retained strong ties to the homeland of its flock, with many of its pastors being of German origin and education. In 1870, a brick schoolhouse, along with a convent and pastorate, were constructed.

=== Current Church ===
When Fr. A.L. Leininger became pastor of the parish in 1893, the church building was too small for the needs of the parish, despite being enlarged twice before. Rather than adding onto the existing structure, Leininger decided to build a new church in the Italian Renaissance style, similar to St. Peter's and St. Mark's. Work began on the church on January 16, 1897, the cornerstone was laid by bishop John Watterson of Columbus on July 10, 1898, and dedicated by bishop Leo Haid, O.S.B., Vicar Apostolic of South Carolina, on August 27, 1899 as Watterson had died a year prior. The distinctive dome of the church has dominated the Zanesville skyline ever since.

Due to a lack of funds, the church was not fully decorated when dedicated, and instead ornamented gradually over time, with frescoes and gold leaf added in 1919. Major changes to the interior occurred in 1960, when Fr. Linus Dury renovated the interior to essentially the current state, save 1986 changes resulting from the Second Vatican Council. The church was added to the added to the National Register of Historic Places on September 25, 1975.

Father Thomas Brosmer, the assistant pastor of the parish, was accused of sexually assaulting an 11-year-old boy at the church in 1968. The allegations surfaced in July 2012, but was not investigated by Zanesville Police due to the statute of limitations. Brosmer was placed on administrative leave by the Diocese of Columbus, and is included on the Diocese's 2019 list of clergy credibly accused of child abuse. Brosmer died in June 2020.

The church hosts an annual festival every summer.

== Schools ==
Soon after the completion of the first parish church in 1842, a parish school staffed by laypeople as well as the Franciscan Sisters of the Sacred Heart was established. In 1893, the Franciscan Sisters of Christian Charity took charge of the school, and a high school program added in 1895.

In 1950, the parish high school was combined with that of neighboring parish St. Thomas Aquinas to form Bishop Rosecrans High School, which uses the building formerly occupied by St. Nicholas School, which was built in 1927. The same happened with the grade schools of the Zanesville parishes in 2006, forming Bishop Fenwick School.
