= Black-Elliott Block =

- U.S. National Register of Historic Places
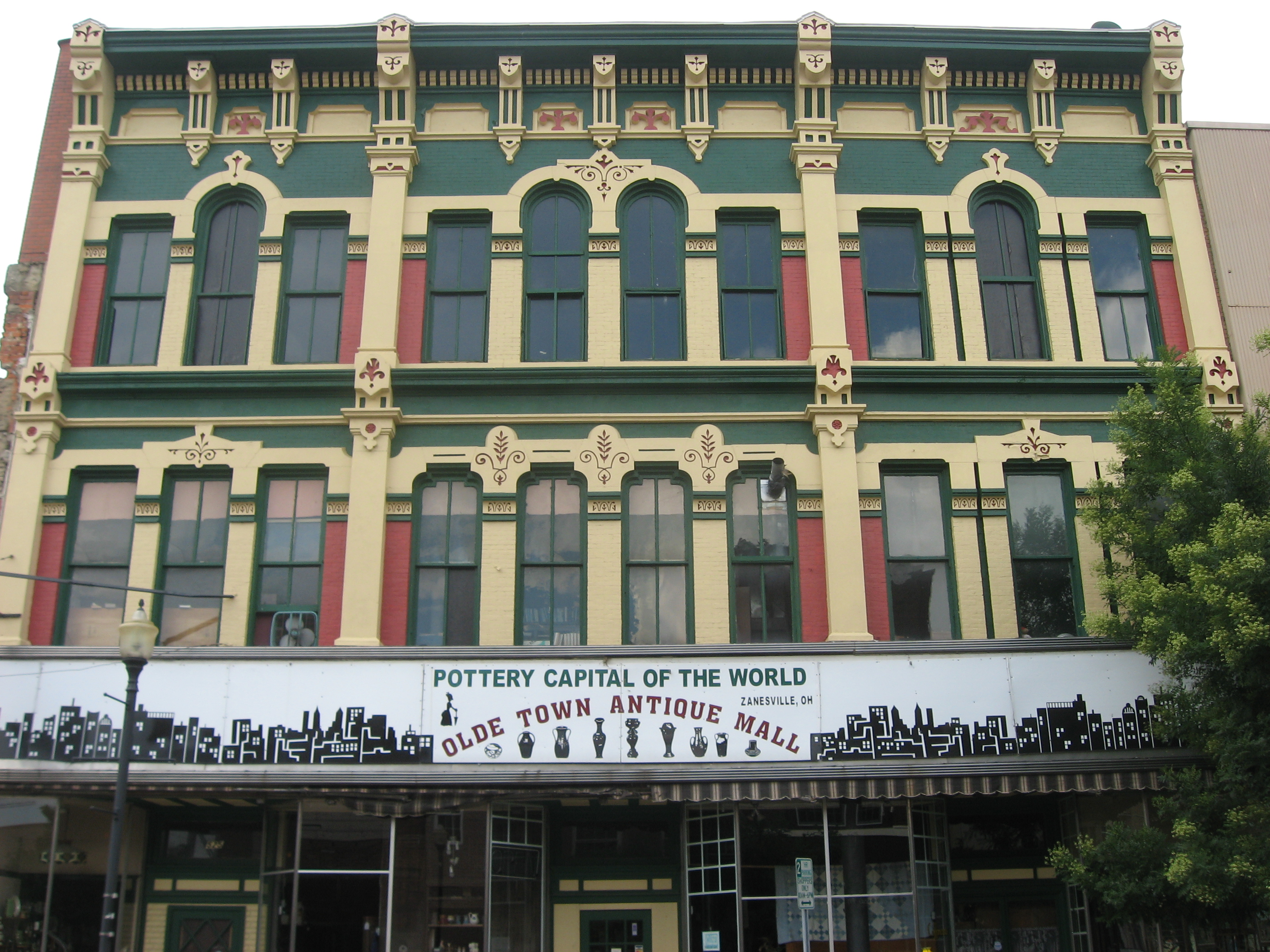
- Front of the block

- Location within Ohio Location within the United States
- Location: 525 Main St., Zanesville, Ohio
- Coordinates: 39°56′25″N 82°0′21″W
- Area: Less than 1 acre (0.40 ha)
- Built: 1876
- Architectural style: Italianate
- NRHP reference No.: 79001914
- Added to NRHP: May 8, 1979

The Black-Elliott Block is a historic commercial building in downtown Zanesville, Ohio, United States. Located along Main Street near the Muskingum County Courthouse, it was built in 1876 in the Italianate style of architecture. The partnership of Henry Elliott and Peter Black arranged for the construction of the building; it was one of several significant downtown buildings for which the pair was responsible, along with such important structures as the Clarendon Hotel. At the completion of the building, each man operated his own business inside: of the 31 feet (9.4 m) of building front, Black's store used 16 feet (4.9 m) and Elliott's 15 feet (4.6 m). The building was built of brick on a foundation of sandstone; it also features elements of iron.

Both Black and Elliott were prominent Zanesville businessmen: the Baltimore native Elliott founded the city's Elliott Paper Company in 1885 and continued to operate it until his 1899 death, while Black led the First National Bank. From its earliest years, the building was known as the "Black Elliott" block, even in published writings shortly after Black's 1878 death. After the two men's deaths, the most prominent tenant was the S.S. Kresge Company, which operated on the property from 1916 until 1977.

In 1979, the Black-Elliott Block was listed on the National Register of Historic Places, qualifying because of its historically significant architecture. Key to this designation was its exterior: no other late nineteenth-century Italianate building survives in downtown Zanesville with so few changes.
