= Alameda Apartments =

Historic apartment building in Ohio, US

- U.S. National Register of Historic Places
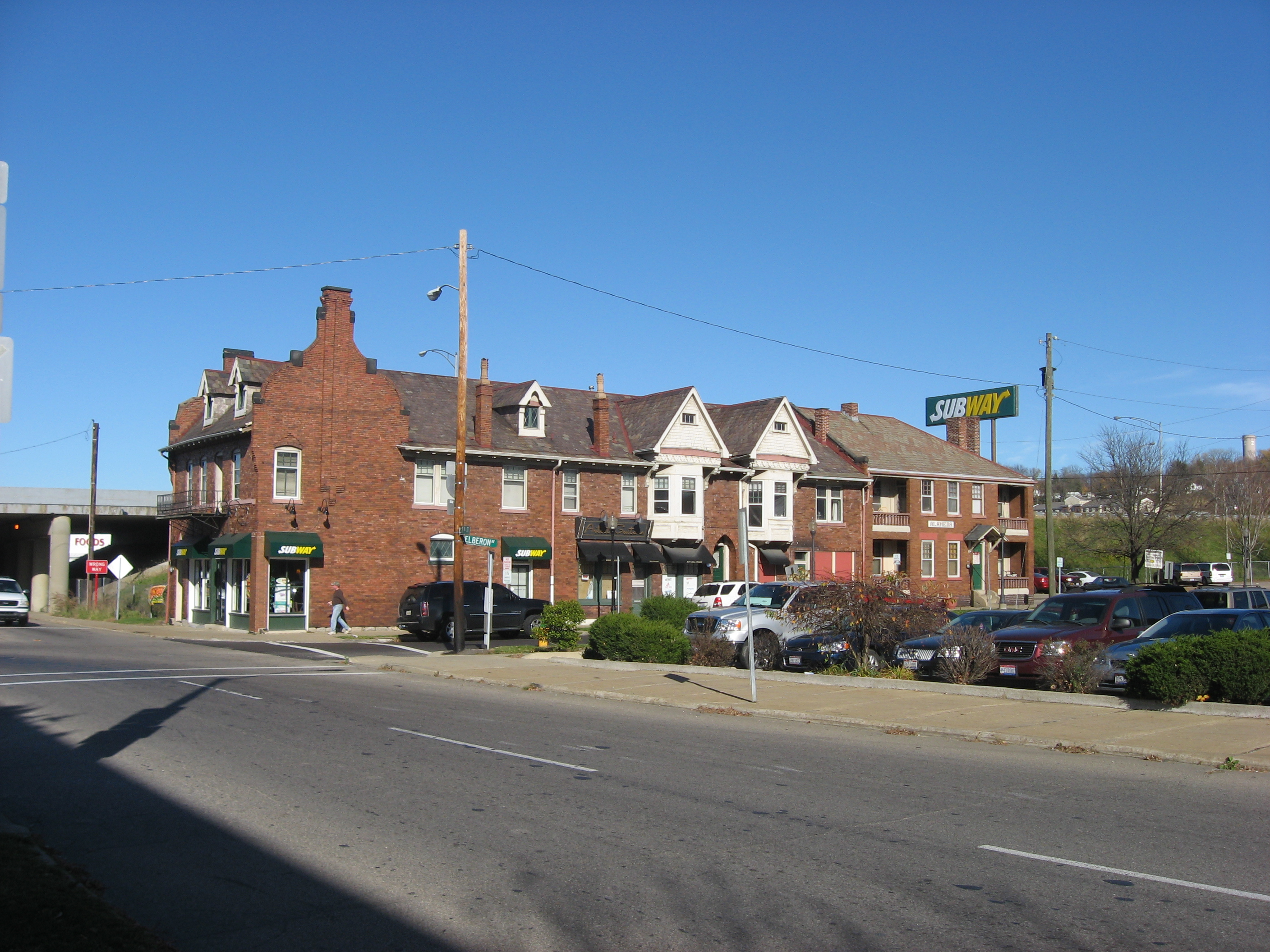
- Front of the apartment building

- Location within Ohio Location within the United States
- Location: 7th St., Zanesville, Ohio
- Coordinates: 39°56′40″N 82°0′12″W
- Area: less than one acre
- Built: c. 1910
- Architect: Harry C. Meyer
- Architectural style: Queen Anne, Gothic Revival
- NRHP reference No.: 82003623
- Added to NRHP: June 17, 1982

The Alameda Apartments is a historic apartment building at the northeast corner of 7th Street and Elberon Avenue in Zanesville, Ohio, United States Of America. Built circa 1910, the building was one of many apartments constructed during Zanesville's industrial and population boom of the early twentieth century. While the architect of the Gothic Revival building is unknown, it was most likely designed by Zanesville architect Harry C. Meyer. The two-story brick building includes a storefront on one corner and first- and second-floor apartments in the rest of its space. Its design features a bell-shaped gable at one corner, two oriel windows topped by small gables, brick corbels throughout, and dormers and brick chimneys projecting from the roof.

The building was listed on the National Register of Historic Places on June 17, 1982.
