= St. Thomas Aquinas Church (Zanesville, Ohio) =

Historic church in Ohio, United States

- U.S. National Register of Historic Places
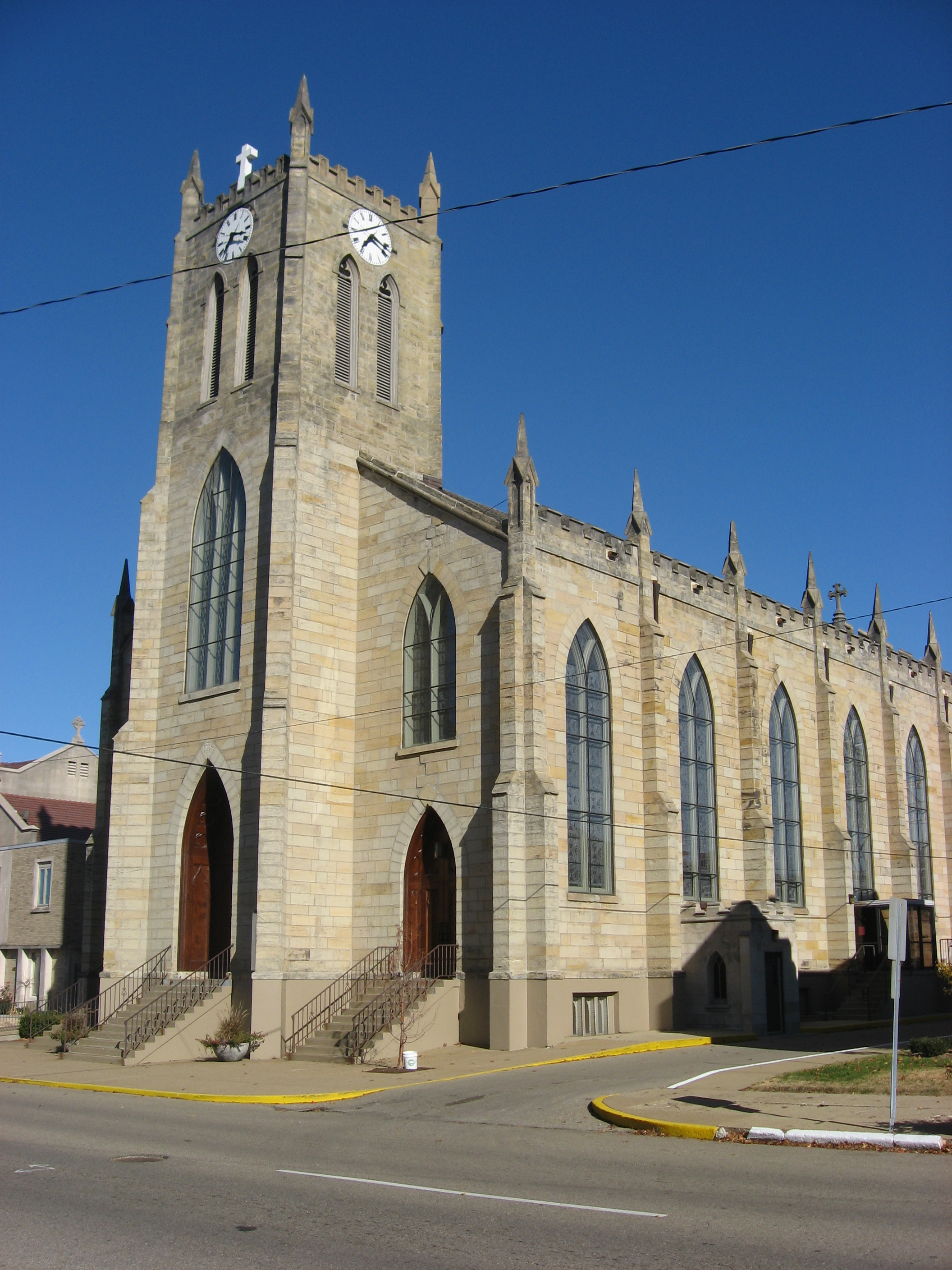

- Location within Ohio Location within the United States
- Location: 130 N. 5th St., Zanesville, Ohio
- Coordinates: 39°56′35″N 82°0′24″W
- Area: less than one acre
- Built: 1842
- Architect: Keely, Patrick; Grinsley, William
- Architectural style: Gothic Revival
- NRHP reference No.: 80003199
- Added to NRHP: March 11, 1980

St. Thomas Aquinas Church is a historic church of the Roman Catholic Diocese of Columbus at 130 North. 5th Street in Zanesville, Ohio. The current church was completed in 1842, added to the National Register of Historic Places in 1980, and was under the care of the Order of Preachers until July 2017.

== History ==
=== Trinity Church ===
The first Mass celebrated in Zanesville was celebrated by Dominican Fr. Nicholas Young, who was traveling through the area to Perry County. However, upon discovering three Catholic families in the area, he said Mass on the second floor of the Green Tree Tavern in the spring of 1819. The tavern was owned by John Dugan and stood at the corner of Fifth and Main Streets. In November 1820, Dugan purchased a brick warehouse to serve as a church, renaming it Trinity Church. Young came via horseback twice a month from Somerset to say Mass for the community. In 1823, Fr. Stephen Montgomery, O.P., became the first resident pastor of the church.

=== St. John the Baptist ===
As the church continued to grow, the converted warehouse became too small, and Dugan purchased the lot on which St. Thomas Church is now constructed, at the corner of Fifth Street and Spruce Alley. To be named St. John the Baptist, the cruciform building's blueprints were a gift of a New York architect, and the cornerstone was laid on March 4, 1825. The building was dedicated by bishop Edward Fenwick on July 2, 1827 The congregation soon outgrew the existing building, and so in preparation for a new church, St. John's was demolished in the fall of 1841.

Dugan died in Maryland in 1825 while escorting Bishop Fenwick back to Ohio. He was interred under St. John's, his tomb marked with a cross.

=== St. Thomas Aquinas ===
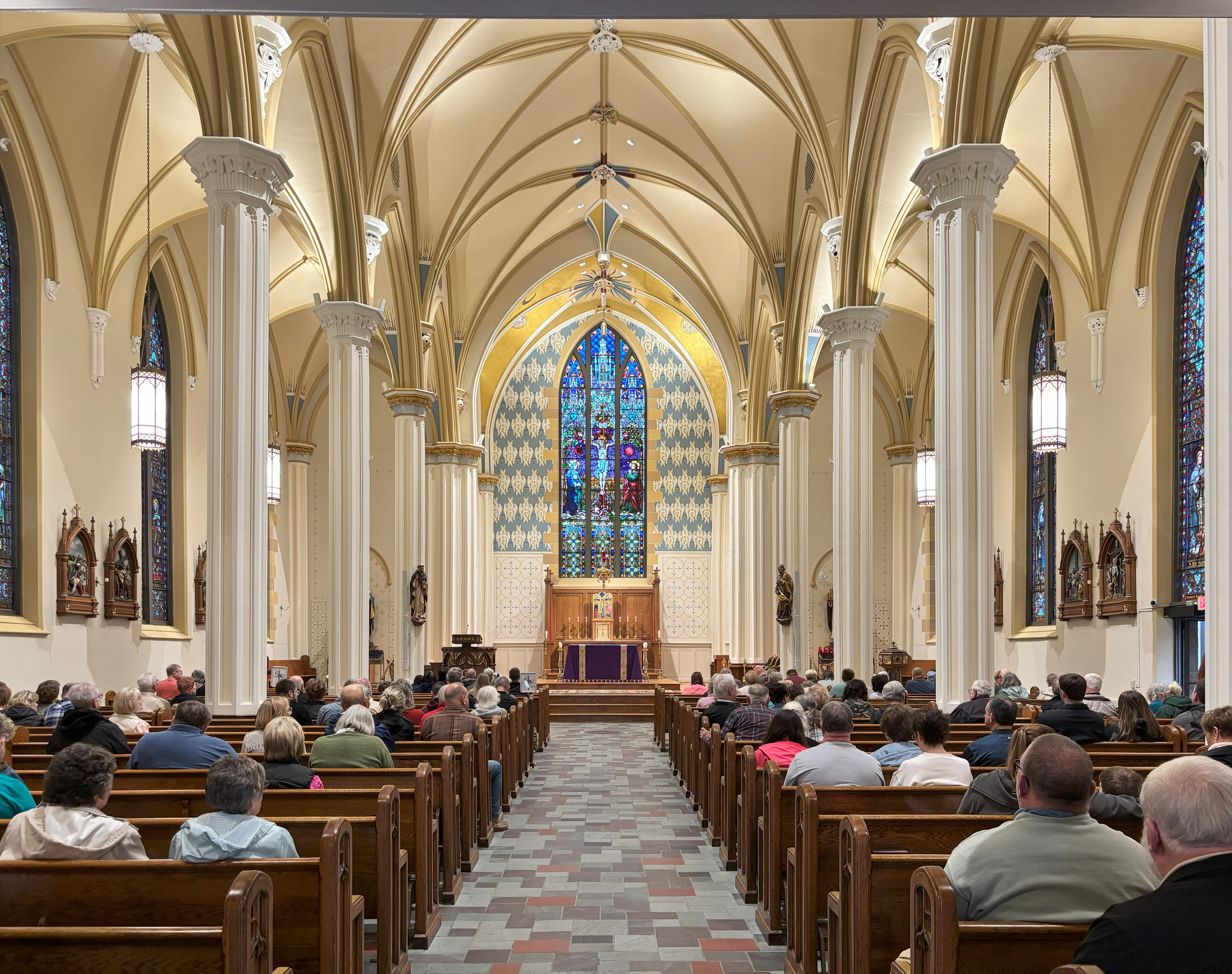
Interior in 2025

Construction for the foundation of St. Thomas began in 1842, with Zanesville's Protestant community contributed funding; local Quaker, John Howard, donated stone from his property. The cornerstone for St. Thomas Aquinas Church was laid on March 17, 1842 by bishop Richard Pius Miles of Nashville. The English Gothic structure cost $40,000, and the first Mass was celebrated on in the basement of the church Christmas of 1842. The church was gradually finished over time, with a steeple being added in 1871

On June 16, 1912, a tornado collapsed the church steeple into the nave during morning Mass, killing three people and injuring twenty-eight. The next year, the Muskingum River flooded, further damaging the church. The parish raised approximately $25,000 to repair the building. The parish ordered new pictorial stained glass windows from Joseph Osterrath of Liège, Belgium in 1914, but order fulfillment was delayed until after the end of World War I.

The church was added to the National Register of Historic Places on March 11, 1980.

In March 2017, The Dominican Province of Saint Joseph announced that the Order of Preachers would no longer staff the parish, and a priest of the Diocese of Columbus would be pastor, as of July 11.

==== Structural Issues and Temporary Closure ====
Structural engineers inspected the church attic on February 26, 2020, and discovered cracks in the wood trusses. As a result, the Mid-East Ohio Building Department condemned the building until repairs could be made. The parish adopted a plan to prevent further damage via shoring, repair the damaged timbers using steel structural channels, and make necessary cosmetic repairs. After starting the project on April 6, the work crew discovered asbestos fiberboard insulation which was likely installed in the 1920s or 1930s. The requisite asbestos removal delayed the shoring effort. Fundraising for an estimated $1.7 million dollars in repairs was approved by bishop Robert J. Brennan in July 2020, and the parish used the main church for Christmas Mass in 2021 after holding worship services at an alternate site for a time.

== Schools ==
The parish school began operating in the church basement in 1830, and was staffed by The Dominican Sisters of the Springs and the Holy Cross Brothers at various times. In 1884, the school added a one-year bookkeeping course that by 1914 became a full high school program based in a dedicated building constructed that year. In 1950 the high school was merged with that of neighboring St. Nicholas parish, forming Bishop Rosecrans High School. The same happened with the grade schools of the Zanesville parishes in 2006, forming Bishop Fenwick School. The former St. Thomas school building houses kindergarten through third grade for Bishop Fenwick.
