= Westview School =

Westview School may refer to:

- Westview High School (San Diego), a high school in San Diego, California
- Westview High School (Tennessee), a high school in Martin, Tennessee
- Westview Elementary School (Winnipeg), an elementary school in Winnipeg, Manitoba
- Westview Elementary School, an elementary school in Vancouver, British Columbia
