= West View (Zanesville, Ohio) =

Historic house in Ohio, United States

- U.S. National Register of Historic Places
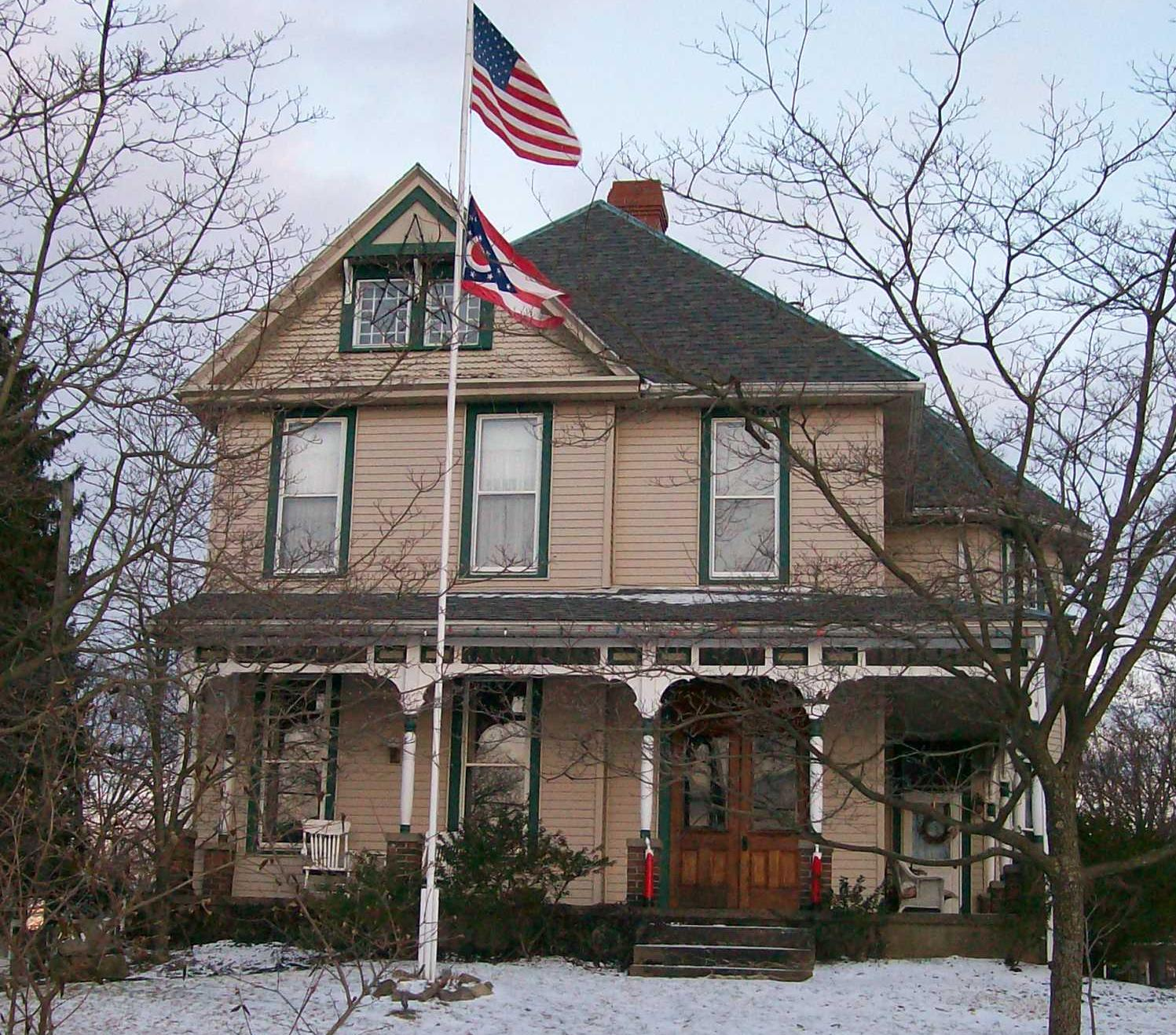
- Front of the house

- Location within Ohio Location within the United States
- Location: 444 Sunkel Blvd., Zanesville, Ohio
- Coordinates: 39°57′50″N 82°0′25″W
- Area: Less than 1 acre (0.40 ha)
- Built: 1890
- Architectural style: Queen Anne
- NRHP reference No.: 82003628
- Added to NRHP: March 5, 1982

West View is a historic residence in Zanesville, Ohio, United States. Built in 1890, it was one of the first houses to be built in its neighborhood.

Richard Bonifield was a leading Zanesville physician, establishing his practice in the city in 1867. By the late 1880s, he had become sufficiently prosperous to build a house in an undeveloped area of the city. When the house was finished, it was among the first buildings along its section of Sunkel Boulevard: the land was only platted in 1913, and most development in the area occurred during the late 1910s and the 1920s.

Bonifield's home features a stone foundation and a slate roof, and the walls are frame. The architecture is Queen Anne in style with many Eastlake features; the latter influences are found most clearly in the front porch, which features distinctive support columns and an ornately decorated frieze. The most significant aspect of the architecture is the house's two-story interior: aside from plumbing updates in the bathroom and kitchen, it has not been modified in more than a century. Among the leading pieces of the interior are the gold-colored oak wood panelling, which has never been painted, the artistic tiling, and the five original mantelpieces.

In 1982, West View was listed on the National Register of Historic Places, qualifying because of its historically significant architecture. It is one of two National Register-listed properties in the neighborhood, along with the Capt. James Boggs Tannehill House, which was also one of the few nearby buildings constructed before the neighborhood was platted.
