= James Boggs Tannehill House =

Historic residence in Zanesville, Ohio, United States

- Capt. James Boggs Tannehill House
- U.S. National Register of Historic Places
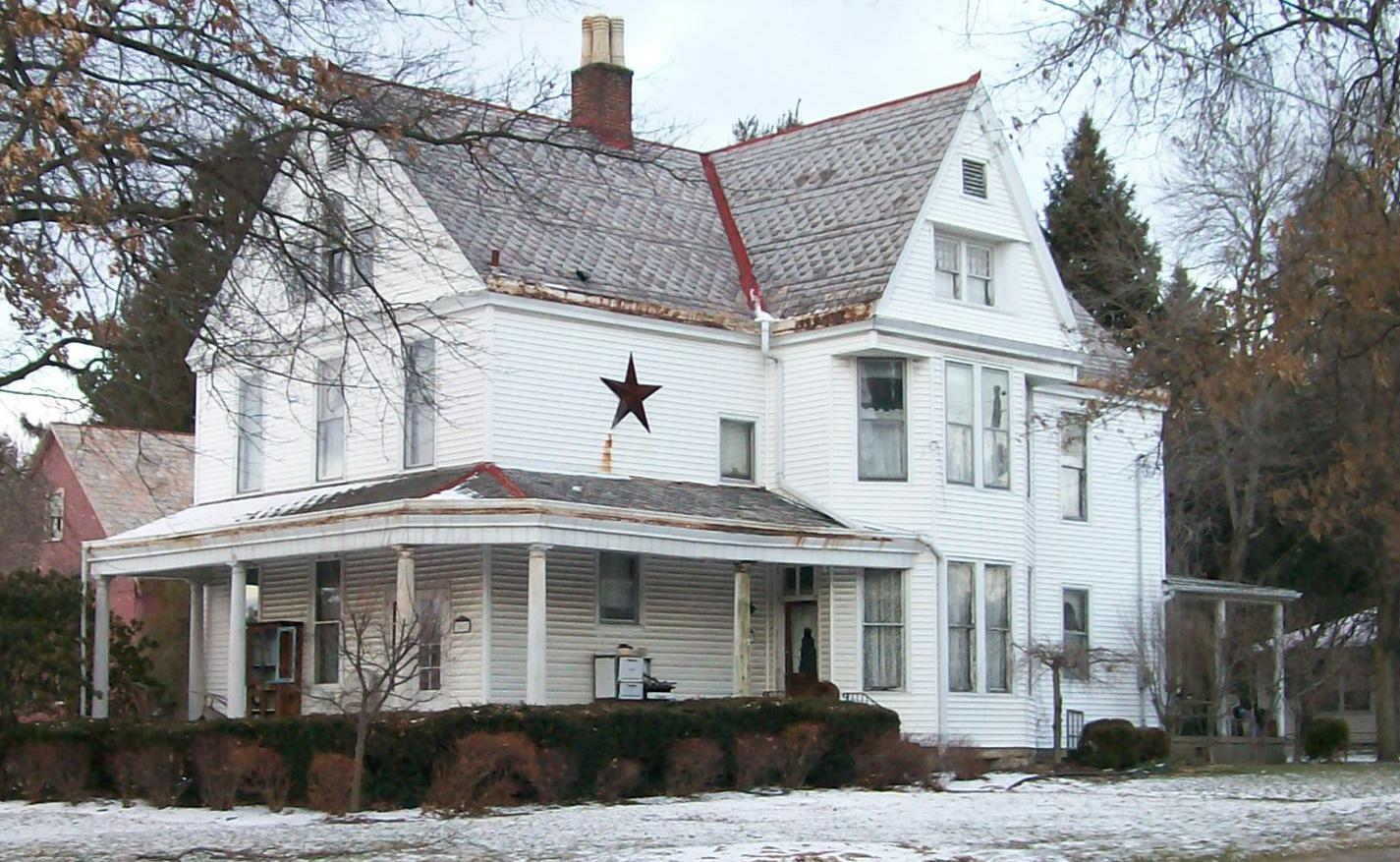
- Front and side of the house

- Location within Ohio Location within the United States
- Interactive map showing the location of James Bogg Tanneville House
- Location: 367 Taylor St., Zanesville, Ohio
- Coordinates: 39°58′3″N 82°0′15″W
- Area: 1.5 acres (0.61 ha)
- Built: 1892
- Architectural style: Colonial Revival
- NRHP reference No.: 79001921
- Added to NRHP: August 27, 1979

The James Boggs Tannehill House is a historic residence in Zanesville, Ohio, United States. Constructed in 1892, it was the home of two of Muskingum County's leading citizens in the late nineteenth and early twentieth centuries, and it has been designated a historic site.

== Architecture ==
The Tannehill House is a weatherboarded building with a slate roof, a foundation of sandstone, and elements of brickwork. Featuring a large front gable, the house is three stories tall and has a large front porch. It is one of the area's oldest Colonial Revival buildings, for that style was only beginning to become popular in 1892.

== Tannehills ==
Born in Belmont County, Ohio in 1827, James Boggs Tannehill gained prominence during the Civil War as the captain of a company of Ohio Volunteer Infantry. Although he lived more than forty years after the end of the war, he retained the title of "captain" in the popular mind. In the early 1870s, he moved from his Marietta-vicinity home to Muskingum County; there, he became a prominent farmer and was eventually elected president of a local farmers' society. As he aged, Tannehill chose to move into Zanesville, where he built the present residence as a retirement home in his sixty-fifth year; there he remained until his death in 1909. After his death, his son P. H. Tannehill continued to live on the property; a well-known local attorney, he was elected to the county's common pleas court in 1932, retaining his judgeship until his death in 1948.

== Recognition ==
In 1979, the James Boggs Tannehill House and a related outbuilding were listed together on the National Register of Historic Places. One of dozens of Zanesville buildings to have been given this distinction, it qualified for inclusion both because of its architecture and its place as the home of the prominent Tannehills. Perhaps its most important element is its place as an early example of the Colonial Revival movement: when Captain Tannehill ordered the house's construction, this style was yet very rare and unknown in general society. Having changed very little since its construction, the Tannehill House is one of the area's best Colonial Revival structures of any date.
