= Norwich, Ohio =

- Village
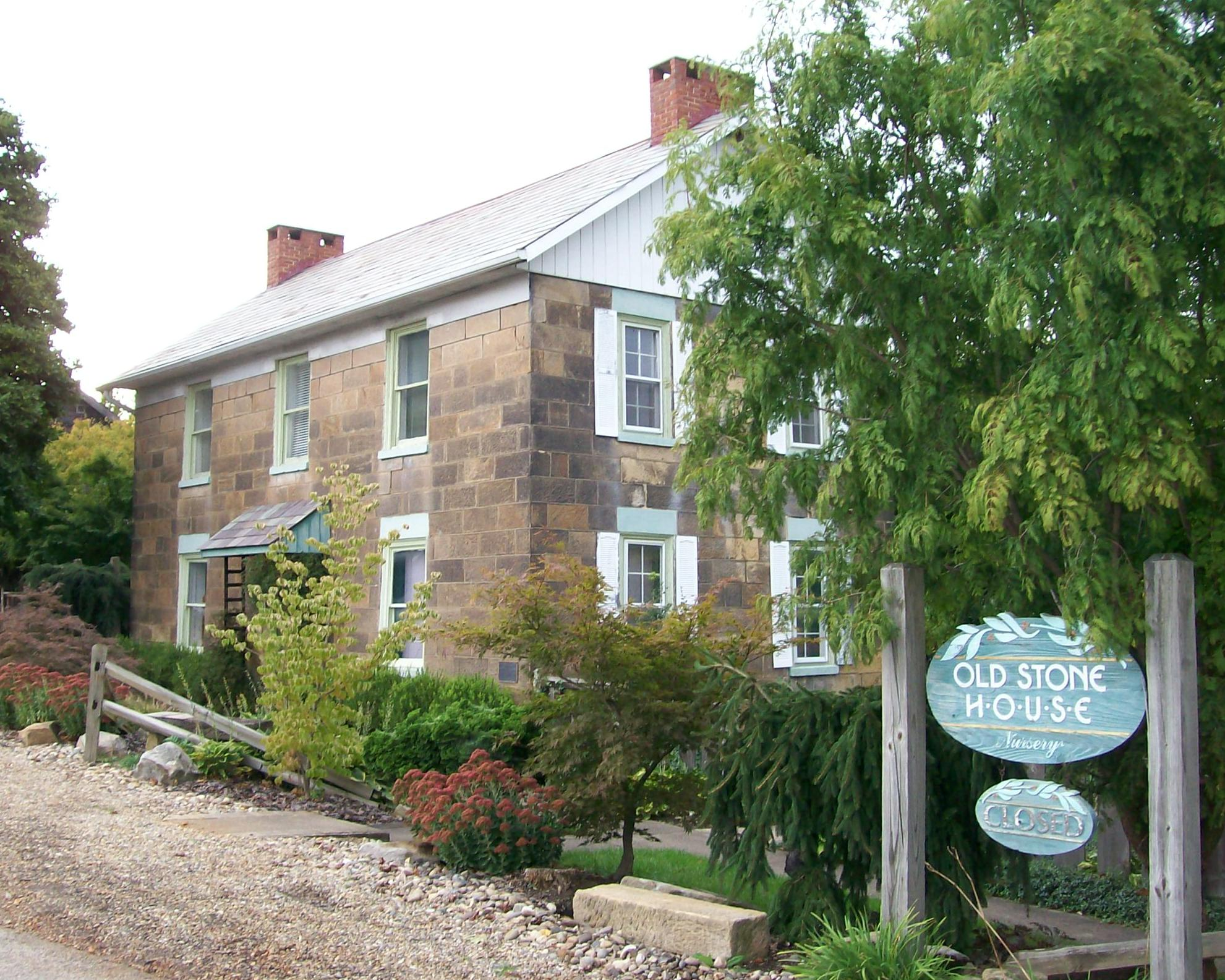
- The Ralph Hardesty Stone House, a historic site in the village

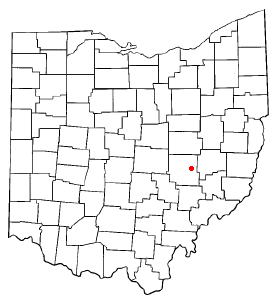
- Location of Norwich, Ohio

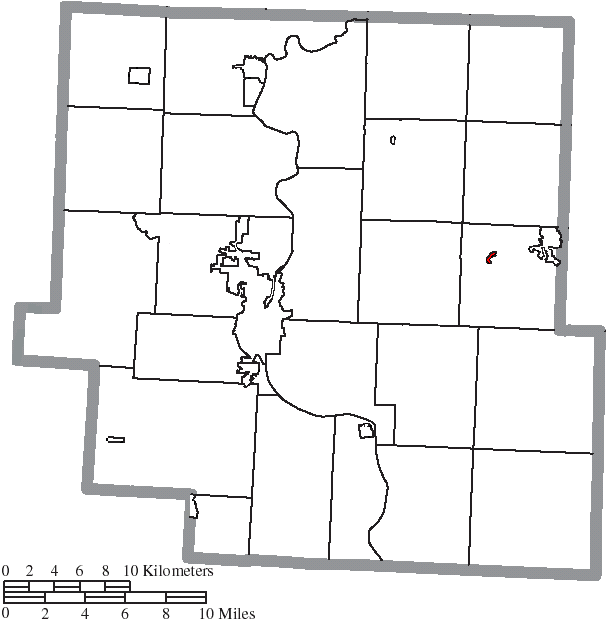
- Location of Norwich in Muskingum County
- Coordinates: 39°59′05″N 81°47′32″W
- Country: United States
- State: Ohio
- County: Muskingum
- Township: Union

Area
  - Total: 0.077 sq mi (0.20 km^{2})
  - Land: 0.077 sq mi (0.20 km^{2})
  - Water: 0 sq mi (0.00 km^{2})
- Elevation: 968 ft (295 m)

Population (2020)
  - Total: 87
  - Density: 1,129.9/sq mi (436.24/km^{2})
- Time zone: UTC-5 (Eastern (EST))
  - Summer (DST): UTC-4 (EDT)
- ZIP code: 43767
- Area code: 740
- FIPS code: 39-57372
- GNIS feature ID: 2399529

Norwich is a village in Muskingum County, Ohio, United States. The population was 87 at the 2020 census. It is part of the Zanesville micropolitan area.

== History ==
Norwich was laid out in 1827, and named after Norwich, in England, the native home of a first settler. A post office has been in operation at Norwich since 1828. By 1833, Norwich had four stores, two churches, and two taverns. The village was incorporated in 1833.

== Geography ==
According to the United States Census Bureau, the village has a total area of 0.10 square miles (0.26 km^{2}), all land.

== Demographics ==
Historical population
Census	Pop.	Note	%±
1830	206		—
1850	324		—
1860	294		−9.3%
1870	268		−8.8%
1880	265		−1.1%
1890	234		−11.7%
1900	253		8.1%
1910	186		−26.5%
1920	142		−23.7%
1930	167		17.6%
1940	177		6.0%
1950	197		11.3%
1960	193		−2.0%
1970	163		−15.5%
1980	170		4.3%
1990	133		−21.8%
2000	113		−15.0%
2010	102		−9.7%
2020	87		−14.7%
U.S. Decennial Census

=== 2010 census ===
As of the census of 2010, there were 102 people, 49 households, and 34 families living in the village. The population density was 1,020.0 inhabitants per square mile (393.8/km^{2}). There were 56 housing units at an average density of 560.0 per square mile (216.2/km^{2}). The racial makeup of the village was 100.0% White.

There were 49 households, of which 20.4% had children under the age of 18 living with them, 55.1% were married couples living together, 6.1% had a female householder with no husband present, 8.2% had a male householder with no wife present, and 30.6% were non-families. 26.5% of all households were made up of individuals, and 16.3% had someone living alone who was 65 years of age or older. The average household size was 2.08 and the average family size was 2.41.

The median age in the village was 49 years. 11.8% of residents were under the age of 18; 9.7% were between the ages of 18 and 24; 18.7% were from 25 to 44; 43.1% were from 45 to 64; and 16.7% were 65 years of age or older. The gender makeup of the village was 51.0% male and 49.0% female.

=== 2000 census ===
As of the census of 2000, there were 113 people, 40 households, and 32 families living in the village. The population density was 1,175.0 inhabitants per square mile (453.7/km^{2}). There were 46 housing units at an average density of 478.3 per square mile (184.7/km^{2}). The racial makeup of the village was 99.12% White and 0.88% Native American.

There were 40 households, out of which 40.0% had children under the age of 18 living with them, 67.5% were married couples living together, 2.5% had a female householder with no husband present, and 20.0% were non-families. 17.5% of all households were made up of individuals, and 2.5% had someone living alone who was 65 years of age or older. The average household size was 2.83 and the average family size was 3.13.

In the village, the population was spread out, with 28.3% under the age of 18, 8.0% from 18 to 24, 35.4% from 25 to 44, 21.2% from 45 to 64, and 7.1% who were 65 years of age or older. The median age was 34 years. For every 100 females there were 79.4 males. For every 100 females age 18 and over, there were 102.5 males.

The median income for a household in the village was $37,250, and the median income for a family was $43,750. Males had a median income of $29,583 versus $25,000 for females. The per capita income for the village was $14,673. There were 21.4% of families and 36.2% of the population living below the poverty line, including 61.5% of under eighteens and none of those over 64.

== Notable person ==
- Chalmers Wylie - American politician who served thirteen terms as a member of the United States House of Representatives
