= Little Hocking River =

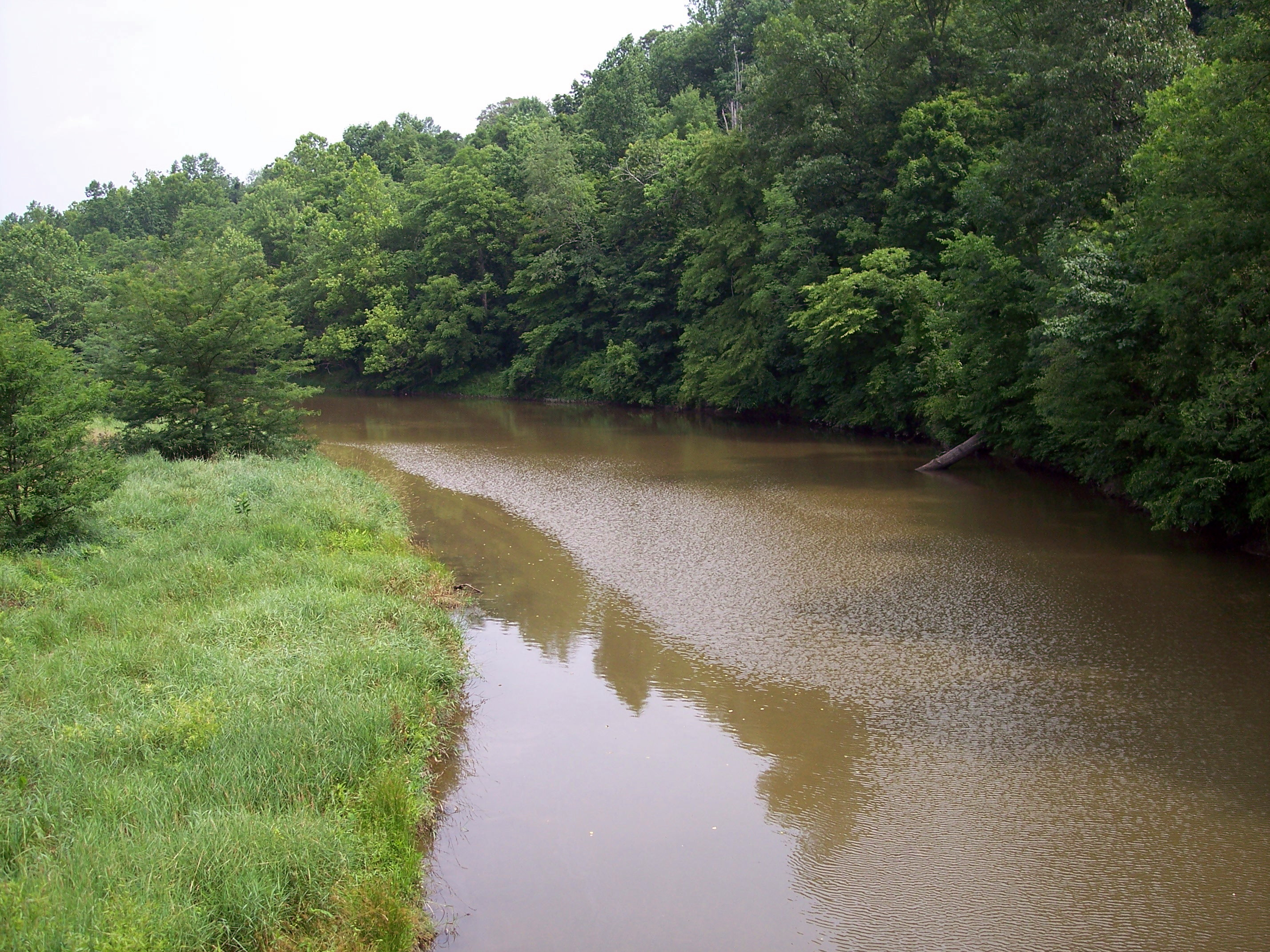
- West Branch Little Hocking River in Belpre Township in 2006

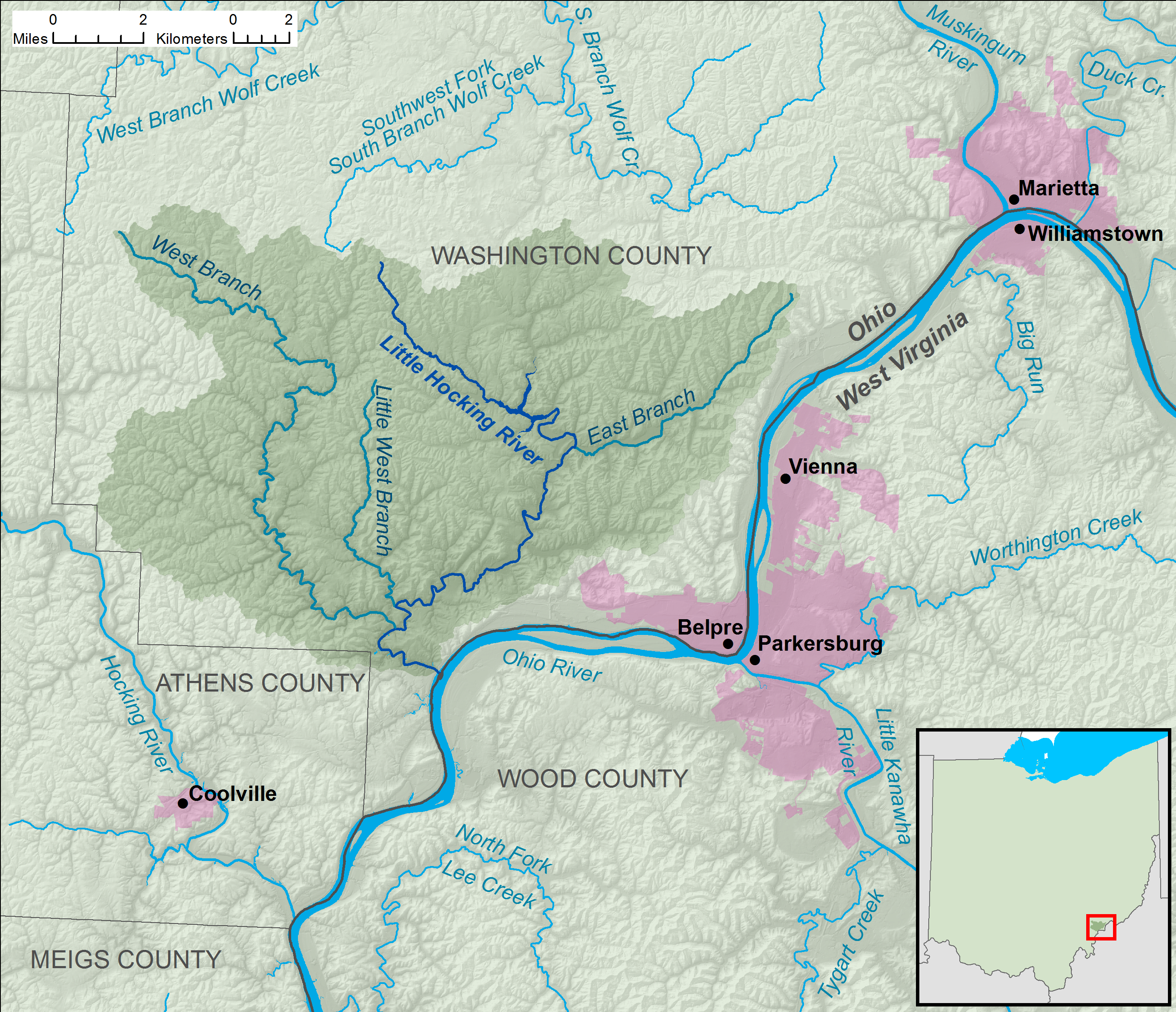
- Map of the Little Hocking River and its watershed.

Location
- Country: United States
- State: Ohio
- County: Washington County

Physical characteristics
- Source
  - location: Fairfield Township
  - coordinates: 39°23′48″N 81°42′59″W
  - elevation: 932 ft (284 m)
- Mouth: Ohio River
  - location: Little Hocking
  - coordinates: 39°15′47″N 81°41′39″W
  - elevation: 584 ft (178 m)
- Length: 18.4 mi (29.6 km)
- Basin size: 102 sq mi (260 km^{2})
- Discharge
  - location: mouth
  - average: 110.29 cu ft/s (3.123 m^{3}/s) (estimate)

Basin features
- Tributaries
  - right: East Branch Little Hocking River, Little West Branch Little Hocking River, West Branch Little Hocking River

The Little Hocking River is a small tributary of the Ohio River, 18.4 miles (29.6 km) long, in southeastern Ohio in the United States. Via the Ohio River, it is part of the watershed of the Mississippi River, draining an area of 102 square miles (260 km^{2}) on the unglaciated portion of the Allegheny Plateau. The river flows for its entire length in southwestern Washington County; its tributaries also drain a small area of southeastern Athens County.

The Little Hocking River begins in Fairfield Township between the communities of Barlow and Bartlett and initially flows southeastward through southwestern Barlow Township into Dunham Township, where it is dammed to form Veto Lake, which is surrounded by the 160-acre (0.65 km^{2}) Veto Lake State Wildlife Area. Downstream of Veto Lake, the river flows southwestward into Belpre Township; near its mouth it turns eastward and flows into the Ohio River at the community of Little Hocking.

Among the Little Hocking River's tributaries are three with names derived from that of the main stream:

- The East Branch Little Hocking River begins at 39°23′06″N 81°32′45″W in Warren Township and flows southwestward to 39°20′05″N 81°38′08″W in Dunham Township. It is 6.8 miles (10.9 km) long and drains an area of 13 square miles (34 km^{2}).
- The Little West Branch Little Hocking River begins at 39°21′28″N 81°43′06″W in Fairfield Township and flows southward through Decatur Township to 39°17′02″N 81°42′40″W in Belpre Township. It is 6 miles (9.7 km) long and drains an area of 9.46 square miles (24.5 km^{2}).
- The West Branch Little Hocking River begins at 39°24′19″N 81°49′28″W in near Bartlett in Wesley Township and flows south-southeastward through Fairfield and Decatur Townships to 39°16′38″N 81°42′41″W in Belpre Township. It is 18 miles (29 km) long and drains an area of 39.4 square miles (102 km^{2}).

According to the Geographic Names Information System, the Little Hocking River has also been known historically as "Little Hockhocken River," "Little Hockhockin River," and "Little Hockhocking River."

== See also ==
- List of rivers of Ohio
- Root Covered Bridge
