= Layman, Ohio =

Unincorporated community in Ohio, U.S.

Coordinates: 39°24′14″N 81°43′28″W

Layman is an unincorporated community in northeastern Fairfield Township, Washington County, Ohio, United States. It lies where Brownrigg Road and Tick Ridge Road intersect with State Route 550.

It is located 27 miles east of Athens and 3 miles west of Barlow.

Although it once had a post office, it is now serviced by the rural mail routes of Cutler, Vincent, Stockport, and Waterford.

== History ==
Layman is the oldest community in the township and once hosted the township's only grist mill. It was originally known as Fishtown, named after Daniel Fish who was a storekeeper. That store was established by James Lake in 1837. The post office was first established around 1857. The community existed as early as 1824, when the original Methodist church was built.

It was eventually renamed Layman after Amos Layman, an 1848 graduate of Marietta College who was the editor of the Marietta Republican, a Democratic newspaper. Layman was a delegate to the Democratic National Convention in 1856.

== Education ==
Layman lies within Warren Local School District although it is very close to the border of Wolf Creek Local School District. Students in the Warren Local district attend Warren Local High School.
