= Cow Run =

Cow Run may refer to:

- Cow Run, Ohio, an unincorporated community
- Cow Run (Little Muskingum River), a stream in Ohio
- Cow Run (West Virginia), a stream
