= Ohio State Route 530 =

State highway in Washington County, Ohio, US

State Route 530

Route information
- Maintained by ODOT
- Length: 7.86 mi (12.65 km)
- Existed: 1937–present

Major junctions
- West end: SR 60 in Lowell
- East end: SR 821 near Lower Salem

Location
- Country: United States
- State: Ohio
- Counties: Washington

Highway system
- Ohio State Highway System; Interstate; US; State; Scenic
← SR 529	→ SR 531

State Route 530 (SR 530) is a nearly 8-mile (13 km) long, east-west state highway in the southeastern corner of the U.S. state of Ohio. The western terminus of State Route 530 is at a signalized T-intersection with State Route 60 in downtown Lowell. Its eastern terminus is at State Route 821 in the community of Warner, nearly 1 mile (1.6 km) west of Lower Salem.

Established in the late 1930s, State Route 530 exists entirely within Washington County, passing through rural northern portions of the county while connecting the Lowell with the Lower Salem vicinity.

== Route description ==
All of State Route 530 is situated within the northern part of Washington County. The highway is not included as a component of the National Highway System.

== History ==
The designation of State Route 530 took place in 1937. From its inception, State Route 530 has been routed along the same alignment that it utilizes today.

SR 530 originally had its eastern end at U.S. Route 21. Following the removal of US 21 in Ohio circa 1969, SR 530 received a short eastern extension over former US 21 to end at SR 145 at Lower Salem. By 1971, SR 821 was created to follow the former US 21 alignment south of Byesville and SR 530 was truncated back to its original end.

== Major intersections ==
The entire route is in Washington County.

Location	mi	km	Destinations	Notes
Lowell	0.00	0.00	SR 60 (Main Street) – Marietta, McConnelsville	
Salem Township	7.86	12.65	SR 821 – Macksburg, Marietta	
1.000 mi = 1.609 km; 1.000 km = 0.621 mi
