= Newell Run, Ohio =

Unincorporated community in Ohio, U.S.

Coordinates: 39°23′13″N 81°16′03″W

Newell Run is an unincorporated community in Washington County, in the U.S. state of Ohio. Newell Run is situated in Newport Township, in the eastern part of Washington County, Ohio. The surrounding area lies within the Appalachian Plateau region and has a history of settlement and petroleum production. The nearby Newell Run geological uplift became associated with oil-field development, with the Newell Run oil field active by 1890.

== History ==
A post office called Newell Run was established in 1866, and remained in operation until 1914. Besides the post office, Newell Run had a country store.
