= Marietta City School District (Ohio) =

School district in Ohio

The Marietta City School District is a public school district that serves students in grades K-12 who live in and around Marietta, a city in Washington County, Ohio, United States. The district has two elementary schools (Phillips and Washington), one intermediate school (Marietta Elementary School), and one high school (Marietta High School), and serves the communities of Marietta, Reno, Devola, Harmar, and Oak Grove. The students are predominantly white, with only 10% minority enrollment, and 60.6% of students qualify for free or reduced price lunch.

In 2020 the district changed the grade configuration of the schools.

== Schools ==
There are four schools in the district:

- Marietta High School - Grades 7-12
- Marietta Elementary School - Grades 3-6
- Phillips Elementary School - Grades K-2
- Washington Elementary School - Grades K-2

Putnam Elementary School was one of the smaller schools in the district. The school ceased operation in 2020. There was a middle school prior to 2020.
