= Equity, Ohio =

Unincorporated community in Washington County, Ohio

Coordinates: 39°33′32″N 81°34′32″W

Equity is an unincorporated community in Washington County, in the U.S. state of Ohio.

== History ==
A post office called Equity was established in 1888, and remained in operation until 1902. Howell S. Devol served as postmaster. The Duvol family were prominent pioneers who also founded nearby Devola.
