= Briggs, Ohio =

Unincorporated community in Ohio, U.S.

Coordinates: 39°19′32″N 81°03′38″W

Briggs is an extinct town in Washington County, in the U.S. state of Ohio. The GNIS classifies it as a populated place.

== History ==
A post office was established at Briggs in 1875 and remained in operation until 1902. Dean Briggs was the name of one of the founders of Dunham Township in which Briggs was located. Briggs has a close-knit community and is surrounded by the rural landscape characteristic of much of southeastern Ohio.
