= Leith, Ohio =

Unincorporated community in Ohio, U.S.

Coordinates: 39°27′19″N 81°09′01″W

Leith is an unincorporated community in Washington County, in the U.S. state of Ohio.

== History ==
A post office called Leith was established in 1891, and remained in operation until 1942. In 1902, Leith was one of five post offices in Independence Township.
