= Stanleyville (disambiguation) =

Stanleyville is the former name of Kisangani, a city in the Democratic Republic of the Congo (DRC).

Stanleyville may also refer to:

- Stanleyville District, a former district of the DRC
- Stanleyville Province, a former province of the DRC
- Stanleyville, North Carolina
- Stanleyville, Ohio, an unincorporated community
- Stanleyville, a community in the township of Tay Valley, Ontario, Canada
- Stanleyville (film), a 2021 Canadian dark comedy film by Maxwell McCabe-Lokos
