= Moss Run, Ohio =

Unincorporated community in Ohio, U.S.

Coordinates: 39°28′25″N 81°18′53″W

Moss Run is an unincorporated community in Washington County, in the U.S. state of Ohio.

== History ==
A post office called Mossrun was established in 1857, and remained in operation until 1917. In 1881, Moss Run was one of three post offices in Lawrence Township.
