= Sitka (disambiguation) =

Sitka, Alaska is a unified city-borough in the southeast portion of the U.S. state of Alaska.

Sitka may also refer to:

== Places ==
- Sitka, Indiana
- Sitka, Kansas
- Sitka Township, Clark County, Kansas
- Sitka, Kentucky
- Sitka, Ohio

== Other uses ==
- Sitka Tribe of Alaska, a federally-recognized tribal government
- Sitka High School
- Sitka School District
- Sitka (crater), a crater on Mars
- USS Sitka (PF-94), a patrol frigate renamed USS Milledgeville in 1944 while under construction
- USS Sitka (APA-113), an attack transport in commission from 1945 to 1946
- Battle of Sitka, a 1804 battle between Russians and Alaska Natives
- Sitka, a font family used in Microsoft Windows

== People with the surname ==
- Emil Sitka (1915–1998), American actor

== See also ==
- Sitka deer (Odocoileus hemionus sitkensis)
- Sitka spruce (Picea sitchensis)
- USS Sitka, a list of U.S. ships
