= Decaturville =

Decaturville may refer to the following places in the United States:

- Decaturville, Missouri, an unincorporated community
- Decaturville, Ohio, an unincorporated community
- Decaturville, Tennessee, a town

== See also ==
- Decaturville crater, near Decaturville, Missouri
