= Lawrence Township, Ohio =

Lawrence Township, Ohio, may refer to:

- Lawrence Township, Lawrence County, Ohio
- Lawrence Township, Stark County, Ohio
- Lawrence Township, Tuscarawas County, Ohio
- Lawrence Township, Washington County, Ohio
