= Grandview, Washington County, Ohio =

Unincorporated community in Ohio, U.S.

Coordinates: 39°30′29″N 81°04′55″W

Grandview is an unincorporated community in Washington County, in the U.S. state of Ohio.

Grandview is not to be confused with the Grand View neighborhood of Marietta, in the same county.

== History ==
A post office called Grand View was established in 1833, the name was changed to Grandview in 1894, and the post office closed in 1964. The town site was first surveyed "at an early day" but later was replatted around 1848.
