= Cow Run, Ohio =

Unincorporated community in Ohio, U.S.

Coordinates: 39°26′52″N 81°18′32″W

Cow Run is an unincorporated community in Washington County, in the U.S. state of Ohio.

== History ==
A post office called Cow Run was established in 1869, and remained in operation until 1916. The community took its name from nearby Cow Run.
