= Archers Fork, Ohio =

Unincorporated community in Washington County, Ohio

Coordinates: 39°29′00″N 81°12′20″W

Archers Fork is an unincorporated community in Washington County, in the U.S. state of Ohio.

== Geography ==
Located in eastern Washington County, Archers Fork is dominated by densely forested and hilly terrain, characteristic of the Appalachian Plateau. The community is located between two ridges, and lies at the confluence of a number of several streams, feeding in to Archers Fork, the main tributary in the area.

Similar to the rest of the region, coal can be found in the hills surrounding Archers Fork. However, early on it was decided by ??? that the coal was not enough to be profitably mined.

== History ==
The community takes its name from nearby Archers Fork, which in turn is named after the first pioneer to venture to the area. According to local legend, Archer eloped with another man's wife and fled to the area to avoid persecution. They settled a few hundred yards from the mouth of Cady's run, and legend has it that they lived inside a hollowed-out sycamore tree. However, by the time the first permanent settlers arrived in the region, the couple had vanished.

The first settler to permanently live in the region was James Cady, which Cady's run is named for. Cady was born in Vermont in 1779, and was a veteran of the War of 1812. Cady worked as a teamster, and was married to Elizabeth Chandler, and had five children. On January 8, 1818, Cady and his family travelled up from the Ohio River to the remote valley, and settled alongside Archers Fork. The second family to settle the area arrived that following Spring. Over the next few decades, a small but steady stream of settlers arrived to Archers Fork. In 1828, a sawmill was constructed. Then in 1832, a gristmill was built. Around 1835, waves of German Americans began to enter the Ohio Valley, with significant numbers settling in Archers Fork.

A post office called Archers Fork was established in 1874, and remained in operation until 1949.

== Recreation ==
Archers Fork is also home to a number of prominent hiking and backpacking trails. The community is located in Wayne National Forest offering some of the best backpacking opportunities in Ohio. The Archers Fork, Scenic River, and Greenwood Trails are popular destinations for outdoor enthusiasts across the state.
