= Salem Township, Washington County, Ohio =

Township in Ohio, US

- Township
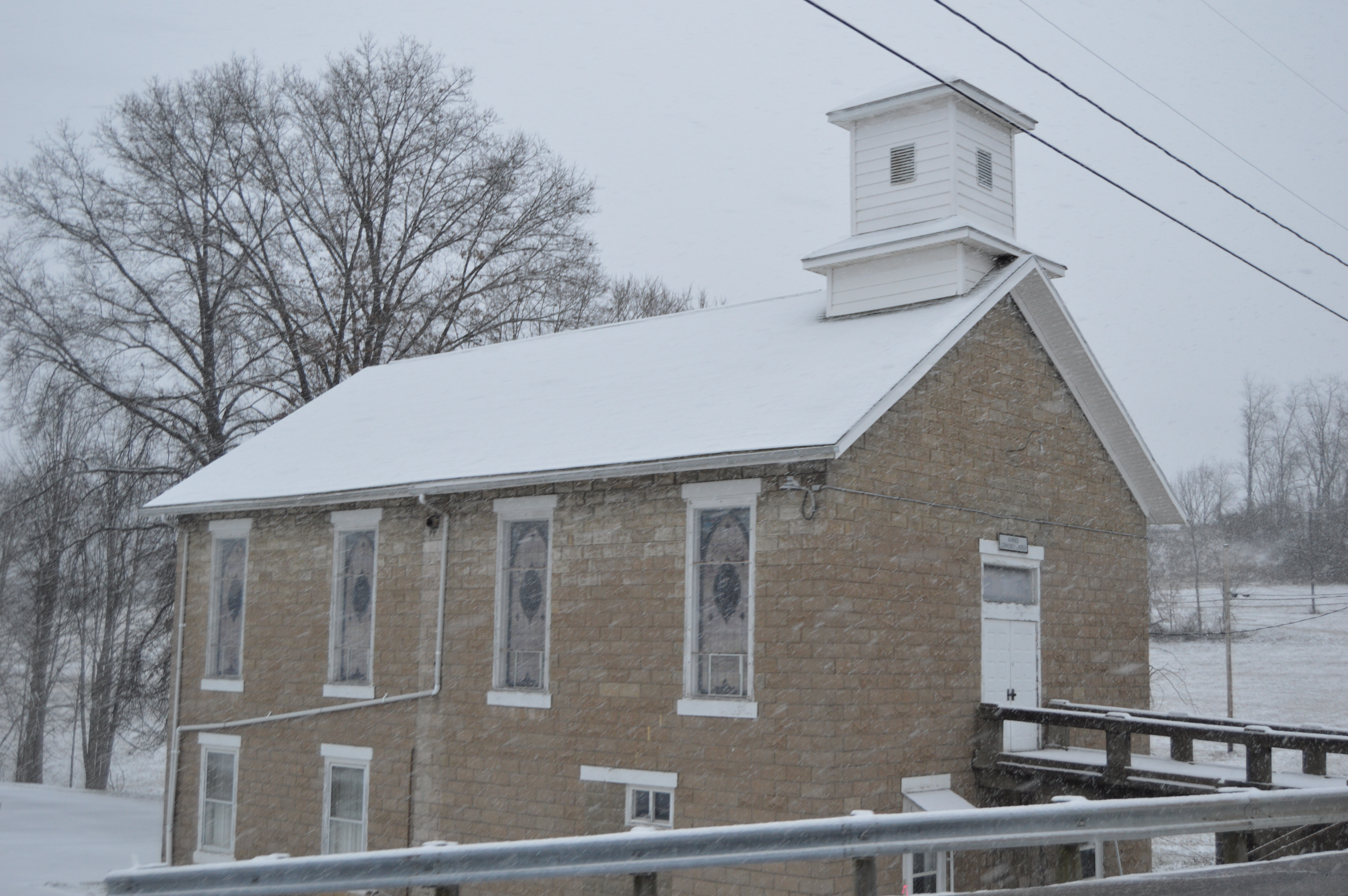
- Warner Community Church

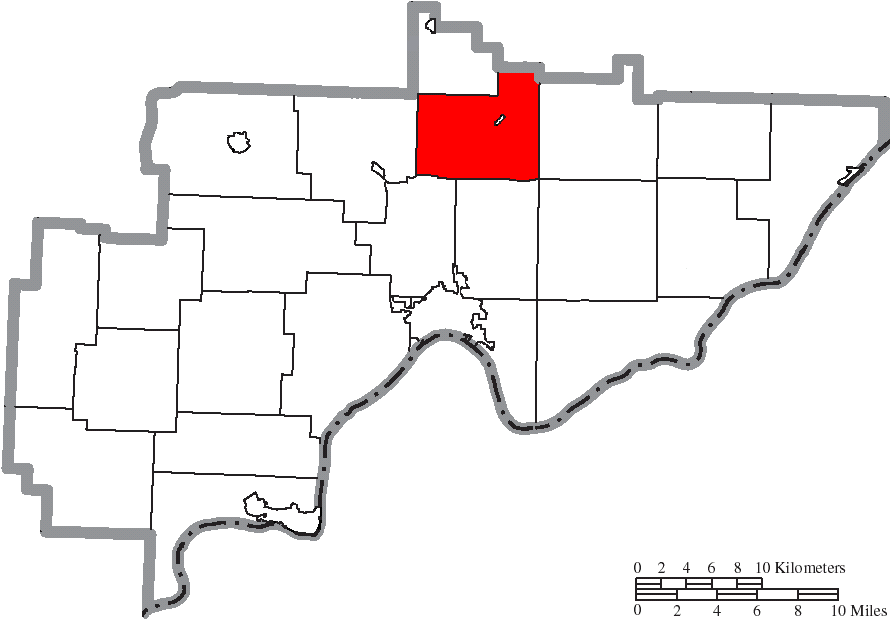
- Location of Salem Township in Washington County
- Coordinates: 39°33′14″N 81°24′31″W
- Country: United States
- State: Ohio
- County: Washington

Area
  - Total: 28.0 sq mi (72.4 km^{2})
  - Land: 27.9 sq mi (72.3 km^{2})
  - Water: 0 sq mi (0.0 km^{2})
- Elevation: 817 ft (249 m)

Population (2020)
  - Total: 1,058
  - Density: 37.9/sq mi (14.6/km^{2})
- Time zone: UTC-5 (Eastern (EST))
  - Summer (DST): UTC-4 (EDT)
- FIPS code: 39-70002
- GNIS feature ID: 1087143

Salem Township is one of the twenty-two townships of Washington County, Ohio, United States. The 2020 census found 1,058 people in the township.

== Geography ==
Located in the northern part of the county, it borders the following townships:

- Jefferson Township, Noble County - north
- Elk Township, Noble County - northeast corner
- Liberty Township - east
- Lawrence Township - southeast corner
- Fearing Township - south
- Muskingum Township - southwest
- Adams Township - west
- Jackson Township, Noble County - northwest corner
- Aurelius Township - northwest, east of Jackson Township

The village of Lower Salem is located in central Lower Salem Township, and the unincorporated community of Whipple lies in the township's south.

== Name and history ==
It is one of fourteen Salem Townships statewide.

In 1833, Salem Township contained a meeting house, store, and a steam saw mill.

== Government ==
The township is governed by a three-member board of trustees, who are elected in November of odd-numbered years to a four-year term beginning on the following January 1. Two are elected in the year after the presidential election and one is elected in the year before it. There is also an elected township fiscal officer, who serves a four-year term beginning on April 1 of the year after the election, which is held in November of the year before the presidential election. Vacancies in the fiscal officership or on the board of trustees are filled by the remaining trustees.
