= Washington County, Ohio =

County in Ohio, United States

- County
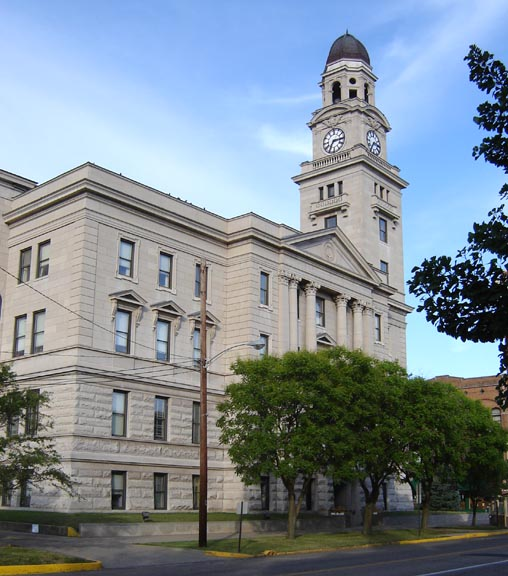
- Washington County Courthouse

- Flag Seal

- Location within the U.S. state of Ohio
- Coordinates: 39°28′N 81°29′W
- Country: United States
- State: Ohio
- Founded: July 27, 1788
- Named for: George Washington
- Seat: Marietta
- Largest city: Marietta

Area
  - Total: 640 sq mi (1,700 km^{2})
  - Land: 632 sq mi (1,640 km^{2})
  - Water: 8.0 sq mi (21 km^{2}) 1.3%

Population (2020)
  - Total: 59,771
  - Estimate (2025): 58,389 ▼
  - Density: 93/sq mi (36/km^{2})
- Time zone: UTC−5 (Eastern)
  - Summer (DST): UTC−4 (EDT)
- Congressional district: 6th
- Website: www.washingtongov.org

Washington County is a county located in the southeastern part of the U.S. state of Ohio. As of the 2020 census, the population was 59,711. Its county seat is Marietta. The county, the oldest in the state, is named for George Washington. Washington County comprises the Marietta, Ohio Micropolitan Statistical Area, which is also included in the Parkersburg–Marietta–Vienna, WV–OH Combined Statistical Area.

== Geography ==
According to the U.S. Census Bureau, the county has a total area of 640 square miles (1,700 km^{2}), of which 632 square miles (1,640 km^{2}) is land and 8.0 square miles (21 km^{2}) (1.3%) is water. It is the fifth-largest county in Ohio by land area.

Washington County's southern and eastern boundary is the Ohio River. The Muskingum River, Little Muskingum River, Duck Creek, and the Little Hocking River flow through the county to the Ohio River.

== History ==
Washington County, originally about one-half the territory now included in the State of Ohio, was established by proclamation of Gov. Arthur St. Clair – Governor of the Northwest Territory, on the 26th day of July, 1788. Events which led up to this establishment were due to the perseverance of two great men, Gen. Rufus Putnam and Rev. Dr. Manasseh Cutler, the formation and function of the Ohio Company and the passage by the Continental Congress of the Ordinance of 1787. Settlement at Marietta on April 7, 1788 grew out of the appropriation of lands made by Congress in 1776 to officers and soldiers of the army. In 1783 the Newburgh Petition of 285 Continental Army officers was presented to Congress asking for western lands to be located in the country which is now approximately the eastern one-half of the State of Ohio. Following this Gen. Putnam and Gen. Benjamin Tupper founded the Ohio Company which met in Boston, March 1, 1786 when they decided to raise funds in continental certificates for buying western lands in the Western Territory and making a settlement. Rev. Dr. Manasseh Cutler, one of the Directors of the Company, was employed to purchase land for the Company and in July 1787 went to Continental Congress. He helped to frame the Ordinance of 1787, which allowed for the purchase of 1,500,000 acres located on the Ohio and Muskingum Rivers.

The location of Fort Harmar, built in 1785–1786, at the confluence of the Ohio and Muskingum Rivers, had an influence upon the Ohio Company in their choice of the Muskingum region as settlement in the West. Gen. Putnam was superintendent of the colony of 47 pioneers who landed in Marietta for the first lawful, organized English settlement in the Northwest Territory. He started a survey of the town of 8-acre lots. A stockade was built called Campus Martius where the Court of Common Pleas was first held on Sept. 2, 1788. The first judges of the Court were Gen. Rufus Putnam, Gen. Benjamin Tupper and Col. Archibald Crary: the Sheriff was Col. Ebenezer Sproat and the Clerk, Col. Return Jonathan Meigs. Paul Fearing, Esq., was the first attorney in the territory.

As early as 1792, the Court of Quarter Sessions submitted estimates for a Court House and Jail to cost $1,000 for each. A log house near Campus Martius was fitted for a jail in 1793 and the first Court House was built in 1799 costing about $3,000. By 1819 a new Court House was needed and this one was built on Second and Putnam Streets in 1822. By 1854 an addition was built, a jail having been built in 1848. The present Court House was built in 1901.

During the winter of 1788–1789 a company of about 40 formed another community down the Ohio River, which was called Belle Prairie, now known as Belpre. A settlement about 20 miles up the Muskingum River was made on April 20, 1789 by 19 men at what is now Beverly. In July a party settled on Wolf Creek and erected Wolf Creek Mill, the first mill in the State of Ohio. The community below this mill was first called Millersburgh, then Plainfield and later Waterford.

Migration into Ohio was almost stopped in 1790 by the outbreak of the Indian Wars, which continued until 1795. Marietta was more or less protected by the presence of Fort Harmar. Fear of Indians led the Ohio Company to petition Congress to create a buffer community. Part of Washington County was included in the Donation Tract which was territory set out in parcels of 100 acres which were given to each male who would settle there within five years after passage of the Act of April 21, 1792. By 1797 squatters seeking lands crowded Marietta. Most of the first settlers were New Englanders who had lost fortunes in the Revolution. Many squatters and those who settled on free lands were Pennsylvanians and Kentuckians and those of Scotch-Irish extractions.

Germans began to arrive in 1833. Scotchmen also arrived at this time as a result of Naham Ward's trip to Scotland where he published "A Brief Sketch of the State of Ohio". Later migrations brought Catholic German and Irish immigrants. Marietta was incorporated in 1800 and the population of Washington County was 5,427. The population increased to 11,730 by 1830 but at the same time the size of the county was reduced with the formation of new counties. By 1850 the population had increased to 29,540 and in 1900 it reached 48,245.

=== Adjacent counties ===
- Noble County (north)
- Monroe County (northeast)
- Tyler County, West Virginia (east)
- Pleasants County, West Virginia (southeast)
- Wood County, West Virginia (south)
- Athens County (southwest)
- Morgan County (northwest)

=== Major highways ===
- I-77
- US 50
- SR 7
- SR 26
- SR 32
- SR 60
- SR 145
- SR 260
- SR 339
- SR 530
- SR 550
- SR 555
- SR 676
- SR 821

=== Protected areas ===
- Wayne National Forest (part)
- Boord State Nature Preserve

== Demographics ==
Historical population
Census	Pop.	Note	%±
1800	5,427		—
1810	5,991		10.4%
1820	10,425		74.0%
1830	11,731		12.5%
1840	20,823		77.5%
1850	29,540		41.9%
1860	36,268		22.8%
1870	40,609		12.0%
1880	43,244		6.5%
1890	42,380		−2.0%
1900	48,245		13.8%
1910	45,422		−5.9%
1920	43,049		−5.2%
1930	42,437		−1.4%
1940	43,537		2.6%
1950	44,407		2.0%
1960	51,689		16.4%
1970	57,160		10.6%
1980	64,266		12.4%
1990	62,254		−3.1%
2000	63,251		1.6%
2010	61,778		−2.3%
2020	59,771		−3.2%
2025 (est.)	58,389	▼	−2.3%
U.S. Decennial Census; 1790–1960 1900–1990; 1990–2000 2020

=== 2020 census ===
As of the 2020 census, the county had a population of 59,771. The median age was 44.3 years, 19.9% of residents were under the age of 18, and 21.5% of residents were 65 years of age or older. For every 100 females there were 96.7 males, and for every 100 females age 18 and over there were 94.8 males.

As of the 2020 census, the racial makeup of the county was 93.6% White, 1.0% Black or African American, 0.2% American Indian and Alaska Native, 0.5% Asian, less than 0.1% Native Hawaiian and Pacific Islander, 0.5% from some other race, and 4.1% from two or more races, while Hispanic or Latino residents of any race comprised 1.2% of the population.

As of the 2020 census, 41.7% of residents lived in urban areas and 58.3% lived in rural areas.

As of the 2020 census, there were 25,254 households in the county, of which 25.8% had children under the age of 18 living in them; 48.3% were married-couple households, 18.6% were households with a male householder and no spouse or partner present, and 25.8% were households with a female householder and no spouse or partner present. About 30.3% of all households were made up of individuals and 14.6% had someone living alone who was 65 years of age or older.

As of the 2020 census, there were 27,987 housing units, of which 9.8% were vacant. Among occupied housing units, 73.2% were owner-occupied and 26.8% were renter-occupied, with a homeowner vacancy rate of 1.4% and a rental vacancy rate of 8.0%.

=== Racial and ethnic composition ===
Washington County, Ohio – Racial and ethnic composition Note: the US Census treats Hispanic/Latino as an ethnic category. This table excludes Latinos from the racial categories and assigns them to a separate category. Hispanics/Latinos may be of any race.
Race / ethnicity (NH = Non-Hispanic)	Pop 1980	Pop 1990	Pop 2000	Pop 2010	Pop 2020	% 1980	% 1990	% 2000	% 2010	% 2020
White alone (NH)	62,919	60,931	61,320	59,281	55,663	97.90%	97.87%	96.95%	95.96%	93.13%
Black or African American alone (NH)	776	773	580	657	600	1.21%	1.24%	0.92%	1.06%	1.00%
Native American or Alaska Native alone (NH)	53	111	149	128	114	0.08%	0.18%	0.24%	0.21%	0.19%
Asian alone (NH)	201	185	274	341	309	0.31%	0.30%	0.43%	0.55%	0.52%
Native Hawaiian or Pacific Islander alone (NH)	x	x	24	9	8	x	x	0.04%	0.01%	0.01%
Other race alone (NH)	56	29	37	48	158	0.09%	0.05%	0.06%	0.08%	0.26%
Mixed race or Multiracial (NH)	x	x	543	853	2,202	x	x	0.86%	1.38%	3.68%
Hispanic or Latino (any race)	261	225	324	461	717	0.41%	0.36%	0.51%	0.75%	1.20%
Total	64,266	62,254	63,251	61,778	59,771	100.00%	100.00%	100.00%	100.00%	100.00%

=== 2010 census ===
As of the 2010 United States census, there were 61,778 people, 25,587 households, and 17,092 families living in the county. The population density was 97.8 inhabitants per square mile (37.8 inhabitants/km^{2}). There were 28,367 housing units at an average density of 44.9 units per square mile (17.3 units/km^{2}). The racial makeup of the county was 96.5% white, 1.1% black or African American, 0.6% Asian, 0.2% American Indian, 0.2% from other races, and 1.5% from two or more races. Those of Hispanic or Latino origin made up 0.7% of the population. In terms of ancestry, 29.3% were German, 16.7% were Irish, 11.8% were English, and 10.7% were American.

Of the 25,587 households, 28.4% had children under the age of 18 living with them, 52.5% were married couples living together, 10.0% had a female householder with no husband present, 33.2% were non-families, and 28.1% of all households were made up of individuals. The average household size was 2.34 and the average family size was 2.84. The median age was 43.0 years.

The median income for a household in the county was $41,654 and the median income for a family was $53,131. Males had a median income of $42,460 versus $28,828 for females. The per capita income for the county was $22,786. About 10.8% of families and 15.2% of the population were below the poverty line, including 22.5% of those under age 18 and 10.0% of those age 65 or over.

=== 2000 census ===
As of the census of 2000, there were 63,251 people, 25,137 households, and 17,671 families living in the county. The population density was 100 inhabitants per square mile (39 inhabitants/km^{2}). There were 27,760 housing units at an average density of 44 units per square mile (17/km^{2}). The racial makeup of the county was 97.33% White, 0.92% Black or African American, 0.24% Native American, 0.43% Asian, 0.05% Pacific Islander, 0.13% from other races, and 0.89% from two or more races. 0.51% of the population were Hispanic or Latino of any race. 29.5% were of German, 23.4% American, 12.3% English and 11.0% Irish ancestry according to Census 2000.

There were 25,137 households, out of which 30.90% had children under the age of 18 living with them, 57.90% were married couples living together, 9.10% had a female householder with no husband present, and 29.70% were non-families. 25.40% of all households were made up of individuals, and 11.20% had someone living alone who was 65 years of age or older. The average household size was 2.45 and the average family size was 2.93.

In the county, the population was spread out, with 23.50% under the age of 18, 8.80% from 18 to 24, 27.50% from 25 to 44, 25.10% from 45 to 64, and 15.00% who were 65 years of age or older. The median age was 39 years. For every 100 females there were 94.60 males. For every 100 females age 18 and over, there were 91.00 males.

The median income for a household in the county was $34,275, and the median income for a family was $41,605. Males had a median income of $32,034 versus $21,346 for females. The per capita income for the county was $18,082. About 8.60% of families and 11.40% of the population were below the poverty line, including 15.70% of those under age 18 and 10.20% of those age 65 or over.

== Government ==
Washington County has a 3-member Board of County Commissioners that oversee the various County departments, similar to all but 2 of the 88 Ohio counties. Washington County's elected commissioners are: Eddie Place (R), Greg Nohe (R), and Charlie Schilling (R).

== Politics ==
Results from the 2020 Presidential Election in Marietta, the county's largest city.

Washington County typically votes Republican. In 1976, it was one of only two counties on the eastern Ohio border to vote for President Gerald Ford, and in 1996, it was the only county on the eastern border to vote for Bob Dole. Only five Democratic Party presidential candidates have won the county from 1856 to the present day, the most recent being Lyndon B. Johnson in his statewide & national landslide of 1964.

United States presidential election results for Washington County, Ohio
Year	Republican		Democratic		Third party(ies)	
Year	No.	%	No.	%	No.	%
1856	2,783	52.36%	2,251	42.35%	281	5.29%
1860	3,169	49.38%	3,060	47.69%	188	2.93%
1864	4,102	57.35%	3,050	42.65%	0	0.00%
1868	4,258	54.20%	3,598	45.80%	0	0.00%
1872	4,231	53.27%	3,680	46.33%	32	0.40%
1876	4,361	49.08%	4,492	50.56%	32	0.36%
1880	4,711	50.64%	4,452	47.86%	140	1.50%
1884	4,790	49.93%	4,667	48.65%	136	1.42%
1888	4,921	51.24%	4,446	46.29%	237	2.47%
1892	4,845	50.08%	4,524	46.76%	306	3.16%
1896	5,949	52.99%	5,182	46.16%	95	0.85%
1900	6,542	53.91%	5,399	44.49%	195	1.61%
1904	6,522	57.55%	4,436	39.15%	374	3.30%
1908	5,648	48.66%	5,771	49.72%	188	1.62%
1912	3,326	33.46%	4,637	46.65%	1,978	19.90%
1916	4,745	45.43%	5,267	50.43%	432	4.14%
1920	9,279	58.20%	6,286	39.43%	379	2.38%
1924	8,704	57.12%	5,727	37.58%	808	5.30%
1928	12,767	73.18%	4,582	26.26%	98	0.56%
1932	9,352	47.05%	10,208	51.36%	316	1.59%
1936	10,826	50.70%	10,203	47.78%	325	1.52%
1940	13,558	61.23%	8,584	38.77%	0	0.00%
1944	11,676	62.44%	7,023	37.56%	0	0.00%
1948	10,349	57.70%	7,542	42.05%	45	0.25%
1952	13,841	65.24%	7,376	34.76%	0	0.00%
1956	13,927	69.65%	6,068	30.35%	0	0.00%
1960	14,197	64.38%	7,856	35.62%	0	0.00%
1964	8,873	44.22%	11,193	55.78%	0	0.00%
1968	11,888	58.25%	6,922	33.92%	1,598	7.83%
1972	14,023	68.63%	5,814	28.45%	597	2.92%
1976	11,513	54.57%	8,914	42.25%	669	3.17%
1980	14,310	59.70%	7,936	33.11%	1,725	7.20%
1984	16,529	66.13%	7,920	31.69%	544	2.18%
1988	14,767	59.27%	9,967	40.00%	182	0.73%
1992	12,204	43.47%	10,380	36.98%	5,489	19.55%
1996	11,965	46.06%	10,945	42.13%	3,067	11.81%
2000	15,342	57.86%	10,383	39.16%	790	2.98%
2004	17,532	58.02%	12,538	41.49%	146	0.48%
2008	17,019	56.86%	12,368	41.32%	545	1.82%
2012	17,284	58.39%	11,651	39.36%	667	2.25%
2016	20,514	68.07%	8,026	26.63%	1,597	5.30%
2020	22,307	69.53%	9,243	28.81%	531	1.66%
2024	22,161	71.20%	8,600	27.63%	362	1.16%

== Education ==
School districts in Washington County, including those that may operate their schools in other counties, include:

- Belpre City School District
- Caldwell Exempted Village School District
- Fort Frye Local School District
- Frontier Local School District
- Marietta City School District
- Morgan Local School District
- Warren Local School District
- Wolf Creek Local School District

There are six high schools in the county boundaries that serve the people of Washington County (as of 2016).

- Belpre Golden Eagles
- Beverly Fort Frye Cadets
- New Matamoras Frontier Cougars
- Marietta Tigers
- Vincent Warren Warriors
- Waterford Wildcats

There is also the Washington County Career Center, a tech school, Washington State College of Ohio, a two-year college, and Marietta College, a four-year college. All are located in Marietta.

== Communities ==
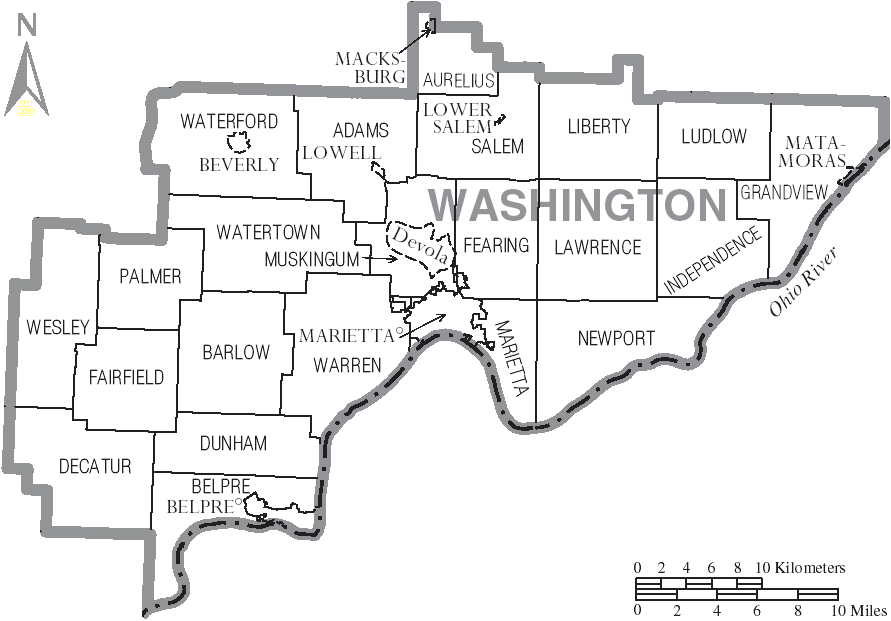
Map of Washington County, Ohio With Municipal and Township Labels

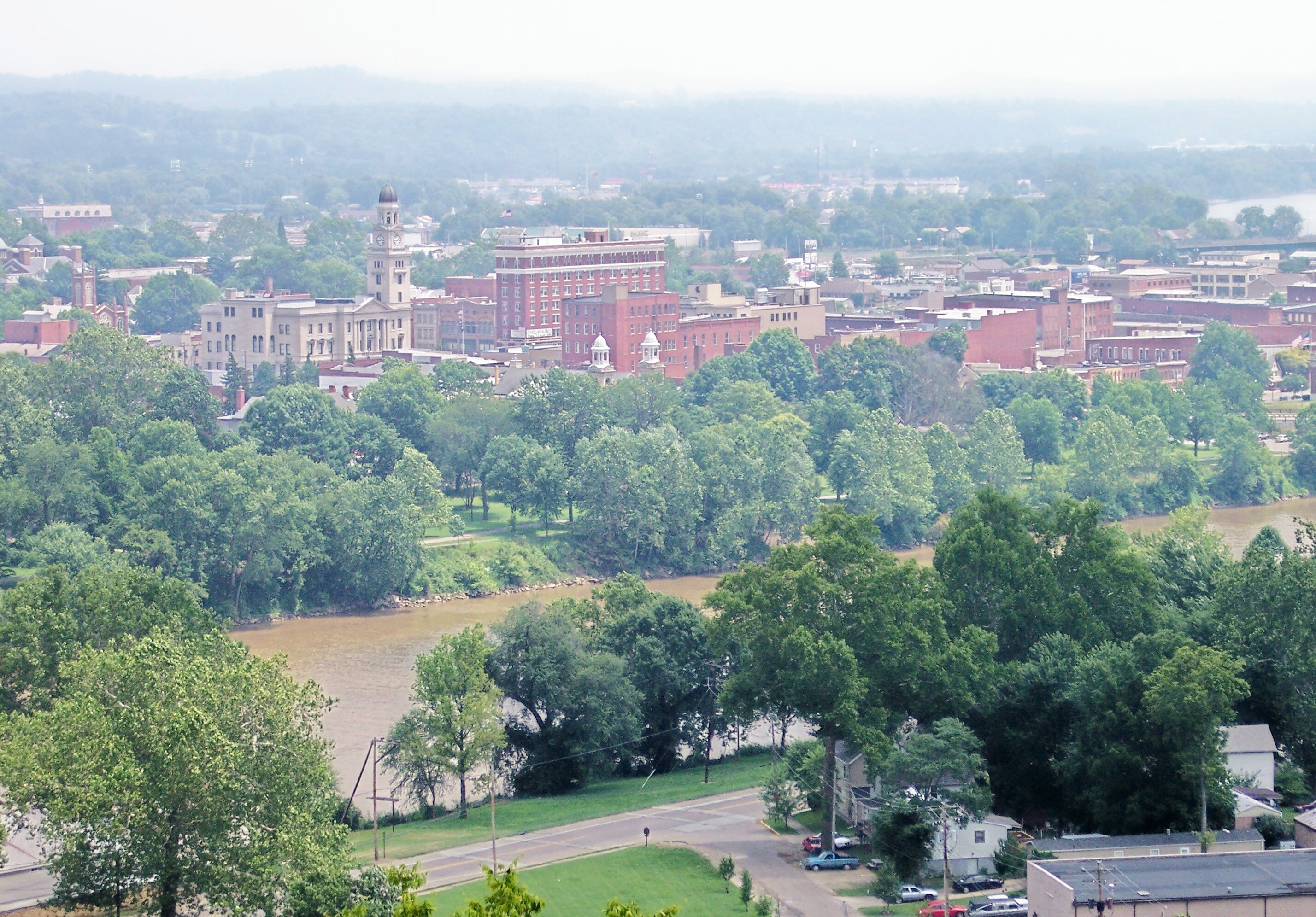
Downtown Marietta and the Muskingum River in July 2006

=== Cities ===
- Belpre
- Marietta (county seat)

=== Villages ===
- Beverly
- Lower Salem
- Lowell
- Macksburg
- Matamoras

=== Townships ===
- Adams
- Aurelius
- Barlow
- Belpre
- Decatur
- Dunham
- Fairfield
- Fearing
- Grandview
- Independence
- Lawrence
- Liberty
- Ludlow
- Marietta
- Muskingum
- Newport
- Palmer
- Salem
- Warren
- Waterford
- Watertown
- Wesley

=== Census-designated places ===
- Devola
- Little Hocking
- Newport
- Reno
- Vincent
- Waterford

=== Unincorporated communities ===
- Archers Fork
- Barlow
- Bartlett
- Beavertown
- Beckett
- Bevan
- Bloomfield
- Bonn
- Briggs
- Caywood
- Churchtown
- Coal Run
- Constitution
- Cornerville
- Cow Run
- Cutler
- Dalzell
- Dart
- Decaturville
- Deucher
- Dunbar
- Dunham
- Elba
- Equity
- Fillmore
- Fleming
- Germantown
- Gracey
- Grandview
- Layman
- Leith
- Lower Newport
- Luke Chute
- Moore Junction
- Moss Run
- Newell Run
- Oak Grove
- Patten Mills
- Pinehurst
- Qualey
- Rainbow
- Relief
- Sitka
- Stanleyville
- Tick Ridge
- Veto
- Wade
- Warner
- Watertown
- Whipple
- Wingett Run
- Yankeeburg

== See also ==
- Covered bridges of southeast Ohio
- National Register of Historic Places listings in Washington County, Ohio
