= Qualey, Ohio =

Unincorporated community in Ohio, U.S.

Coordinates: 39°21′17″N 81°45′30″W

Qualey is an unincorporated community in Washington County, in the U.S. state of Ohio.

== History ==
A post office called Qualey was established in 1891, and remained in operation until 1918. The community has the name of Michael Qualey, the original owner of the town site.
