= Beckett, Ohio =

Unincorporated community in Ohio, U.S.

Coordinates: 39°35′04″N 81°42′28″W

Beckett is an unincorporated community in Washington County, in the U.S. state of Ohio.

== History ==
A post office called Becketts was established in 1888, the name was shortened to Beckett in 1893, and the post office closed in 1936. A variant name was Beckett's Station.
