= Patten Mills, Ohio =

Unincorporated community in Ohio, U.S.

Coordinates: 39°27′26″N 81°46′53″W

Patten Mills is an unincorporated community in Washington County, in the U.S. state of Ohio.

== History ==
A post office was established at Patten Mills in 1866, and remained in operation until 1906. The namesake Patten's Mills was a mill on Wolf Creek.
