= Reno, Ohio =

Census-designated place in Ohio, US

- CDP
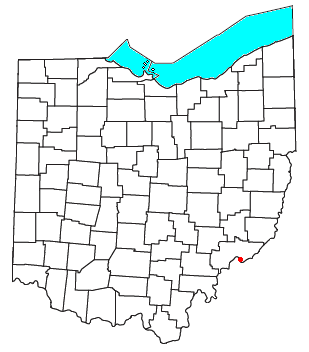
- Location of Reno, Ohio
- Coordinates: 39°22′28″N 81°23′37″W
- Country: United States
- State: Ohio
- County: Washington
- Township: Marietta
- Elevation: 650 ft (200 m)

Population (2020)
  - Total: 1,129
- Time zone: UTC-5 (Eastern (EST))
  - Summer (DST): UTC-4 (EDT)
- ZIP code: 45773
- GNIS feature ID: 2633221

Reno is a census-designated place in southern Marietta Township, Washington County, Ohio, United States. It has a post office with the ZIP code 45773. It is located on the Ohio River a short distance south of the county seat of Marietta. State Route 7 forms its main street. The population was 1,129 at the 2020 census.

== History ==
Reno was originally called Jericho; the present name, honoring United States Army officer Jesse L. Reno, was adopted when at the time the post office was established. A post office called Reno has been in operation since 1887.

== Education ==
It is in the Marietta City School District.

== See also ==
- List of cities and towns along the Ohio River
