= Fearing Township, Washington County, Ohio =

Township in Ohio, US

- Township
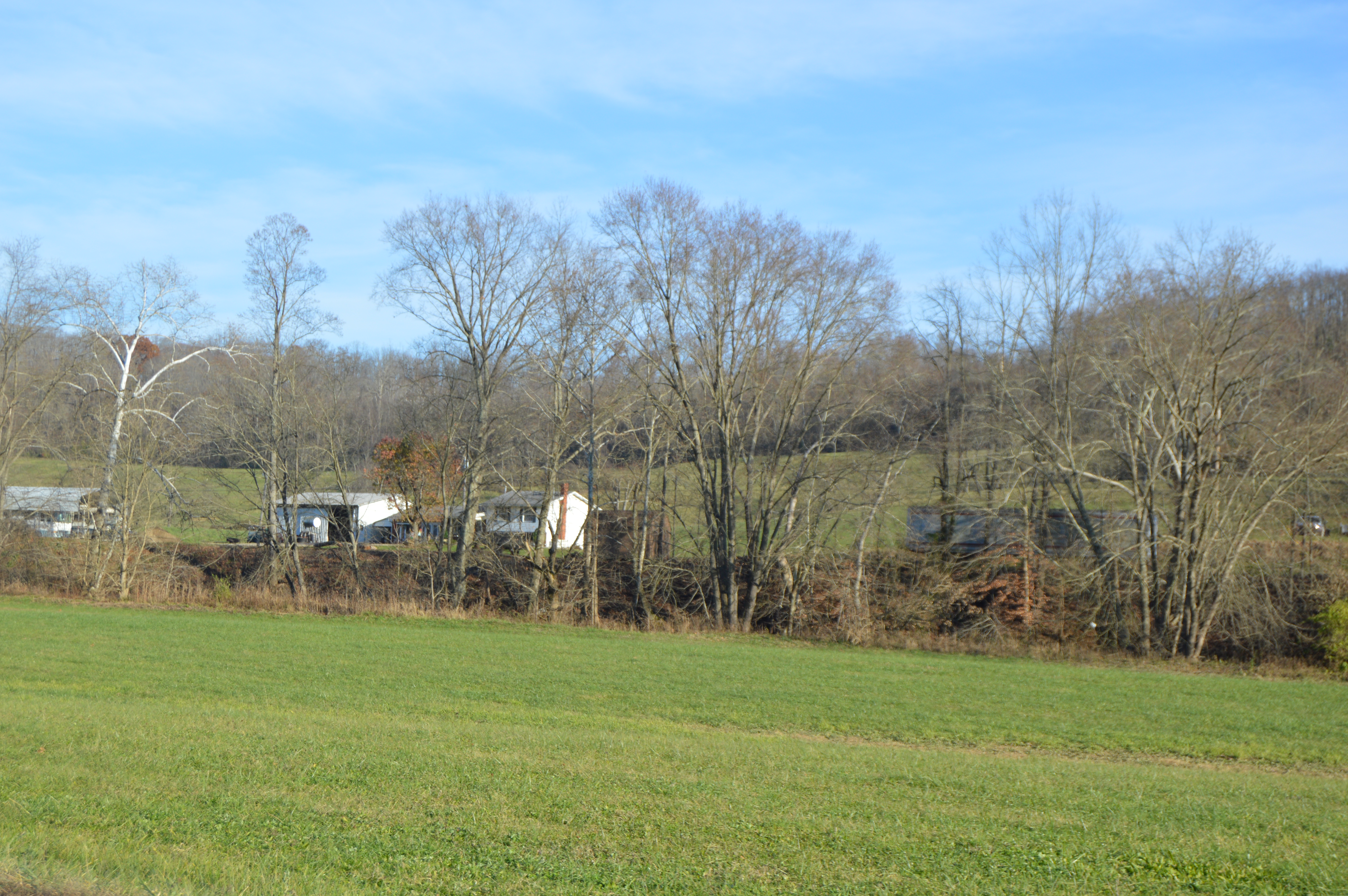
- Duck Creek along State Route 821, south of Whipple

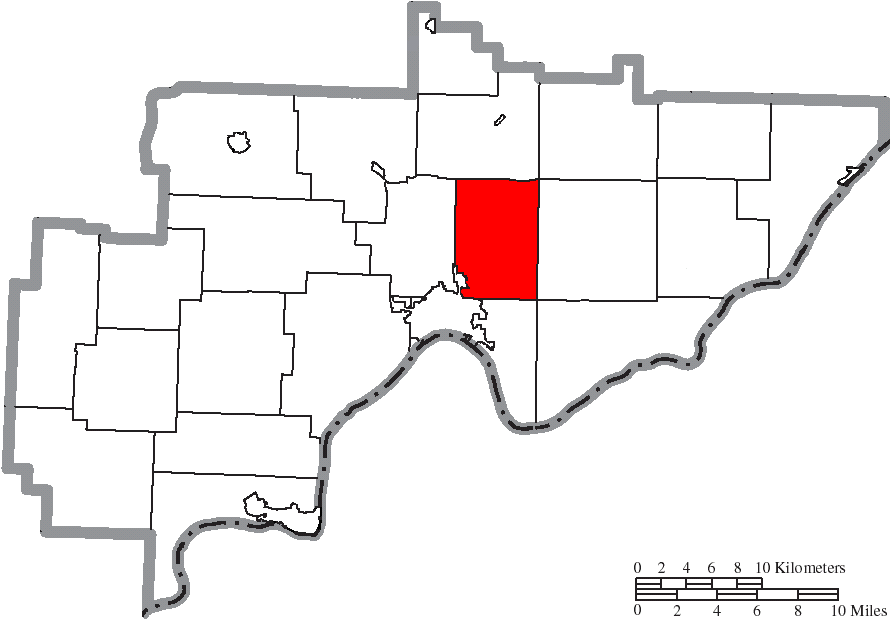
- Location of Fearing Township in Washington County
- Coordinates: 39°29′7″N 81°23′53″W
- Country: United States
- State: Ohio
- County: Washington

Area
  - Total: 23.7 sq mi (61.4 km^{2})
  - Land: 23.5 sq mi (60.8 km^{2})
  - Water: 0.19 sq mi (0.5 km^{2})
- Elevation: 797 ft (243 m)

Population (2020)
  - Total: 858
  - Density: 37/sq mi (14.1/km^{2})
- Time zone: UTC-5 (Eastern (EST))
  - Summer (DST): UTC-4 (EDT)
- FIPS code: 39-26810
- GNIS feature ID: 1087132

Fearing Township is one of the twenty-two townships of Washington County, Ohio, United States. The 2020 census found 858 people in the township.

== Geography ==
Located in the central part of the county, it borders the following townships:

- Salem Township - north
- Liberty Township - northeast corner
- Lawrence Township - east
- Newport Township - southeast corner
- Marietta Township - south
- Muskingum Township - west

A small portion of the county seat of Marietta is located in southwestern Fearing Township.

== Name and history ==
Fearing Township was established in 1808, and named for Paul Fearing, an early settler. It is the only Fearing Township statewide.

== Government ==
The township is governed by a three-member board of trustees, who are elected in November of odd-numbered years to a four-year term beginning on the following January 1. Two are elected in the year after the presidential election and one is elected in the year before it. There is also an elected township fiscal officer, who serves a four-year term beginning on April 1 of the year after the election, which is held in November of the year before the presidential election. Vacancies in the fiscal officership or on the board of trustees are filled by the remaining trustees.
