= Deucher, Ohio =

Extinct town in Ohio, U.S.

Coordinates: 39°27′59″N 81°11′48″W

Deucher is an extinct town in Washington County, in the U.S. state of Ohio. The GNIS classifies it as a populated place.

A post office called Deucher was established in 1885, and remained in operation until 1950. Daniel Deucher was a partner in the firm of Bliss & Deucher, the town merchants.
