= Elba, Ohio =

Unincorporated community in Ohio, U.S.

Coordinates: 39°36′29″N 81°24′47″W

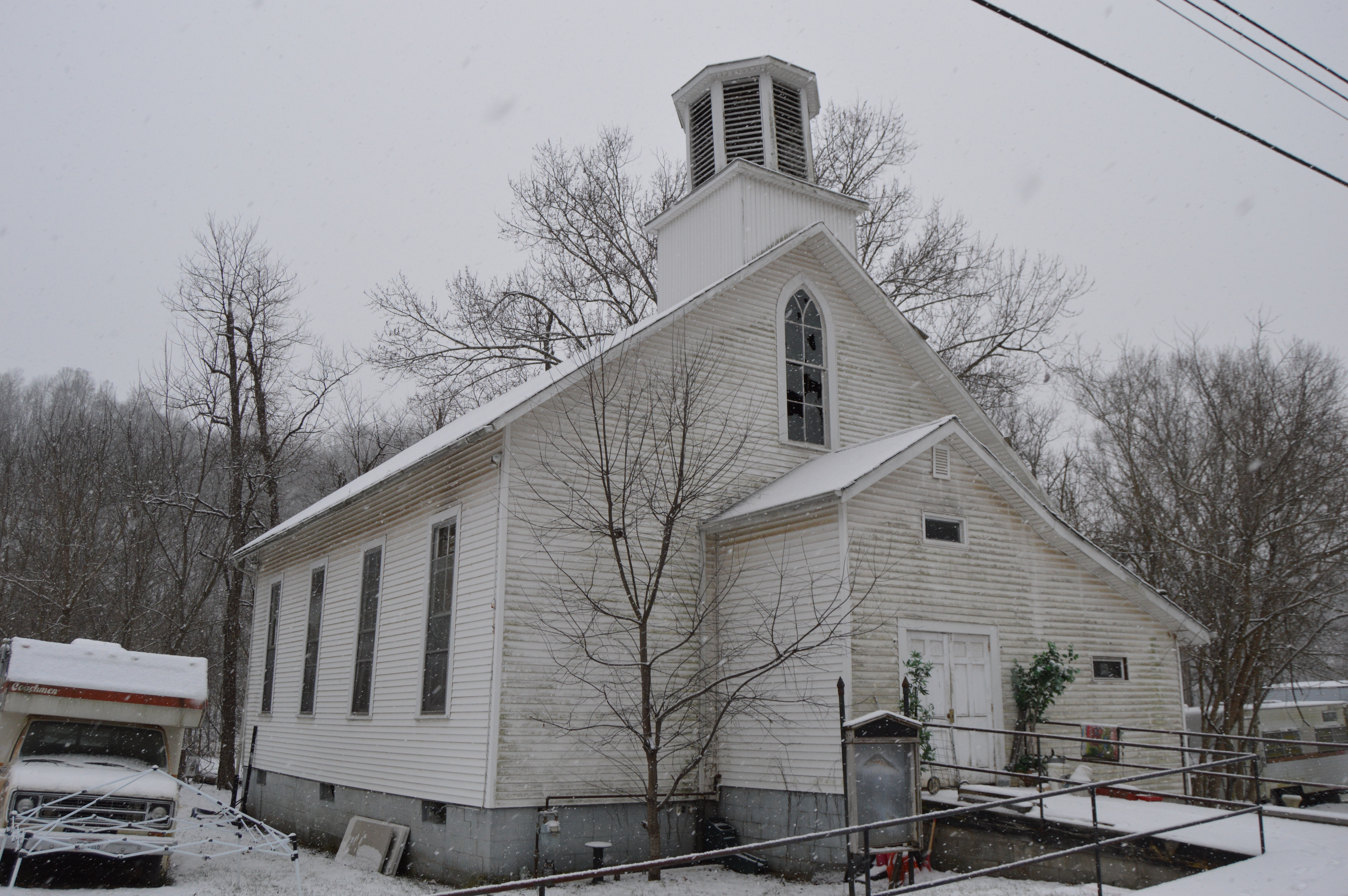
Church on State Route 821

Elba is an unincorporated community in Washington County, in the U.S. state of Ohio.

== History ==
A post office called Elba was established in 1871, and remained in operation until 1984. The community most likely was named after Elba, an island in the Mediterranean Sea.
