= Wade, Ohio =

Unincorporated community in Ohio, U.S.

Coordinates: 39°26′26″N 81°10′21″W

Wade is an unincorporated community in Washington County, in the U.S. state of Ohio.

== History ==
A former variant name was Ostend. A post office called Ostend was established in 1842, the name was changed to Wade in 1864, the post office closed in 1956. The present name is for Benjamin Wade, a United States Senator from Ohio (1851-1869).
