= Cornerville, Ohio =

Unincorporated community in Ohio, U.S.

Coordinates: 39°23′48″N 81°22′29″W

Cornerville is an unincorporated community in Washington County, in the U.S. state of Ohio.

== History ==
A post office called Cornerville opened in 1890, and was discontinued in 1891. Besides the post office, Cornerville had the Little Muskingum Congregational church, established in 1843.
