= Fairfield Township, Ohio =

Fairfield Township may refer to the following places in the U.S. state of Ohio:

- Fairfield Township, Butler County, Ohio
- Fairfield Township, Columbiana County, Ohio
- Fairfield Township, Highland County, Ohio
- Fairfield Township, Huron County, Ohio
- Fairfield Township, Madison County, Ohio
- Fairfield Township, Tuscarawas County, Ohio
- Fairfield Township, Washington County, Ohio

== See also ==
- Fairfield Township (disambiguation)
