= Decaturville, Ohio =

Unincorporated community in Ohio, U.S.

Coordinates: 39°20′05″N 81°45′17″W

Decaturville is an unincorporated community in Washington County, in the U.S. state of Ohio.

== History ==
The area now known as Decaturville was originally called "Upper Settlement", as it was settled somewhat later than the "Lower Settlement", i.e. Fillmore. A post office called Decaturville was established in 1851, and remained in operation until 1904.
