= Yankeeburg, Ohio =

Unincorporated community in Ohio, U.S.

Coordinates: 39°22′49″N 81°20′35″W

Yankeeburg is an unincorporated community in Washington County, in the U.S. state of Ohio. It belongs to the Eastern Time Zone (UTC -5 hours).

== History ==
A post office called Yankeeburgh was established in 1886, the name was changed to Yankeeburg in 1891, and the post office closed in 1902 Besides the post office, Yankeeburg had its own schoolhouse.
