= Dunham, Ohio =

Unincorporated community in Ohio, U.S.

Coordinates: 39°20′05″N 81°37′40″W

Dunham is an unincorporated community in Washington County, in the U.S. state of Ohio.

== History ==
A post office called Dunham was established in 1857, and remained in operation until 1902. The community shares its name with the township in which it is located.
