= Gracey, Ohio =

Unincorporated community in Ohio, U.S.

Coordinates: 39°26′19″N 81°17′39″W

Gracey is an unincorporated community in Washington County, in the U.S. state of Ohio.

== History ==
A post office called Gracey was established in 1882, and remained in operation until 1916. George W. Gracey was the town's merchant.
