= Bonn, Ohio =

Unincorporated community in Ohio, U.S.

Coordinates: 39°31′53″N 81°23′07″W

Bonn is an unincorporated community in Washington County, in the U.S. state of Ohio.

== History ==
Bonn was laid out around 1835, and named after Bonn, in Germany, the native land of a large share of the first settlers. A post office called Bonn was established in 1844, and remained in operation until 1901.
