= Veto, Ohio =

Unincorporated community in Ohio, U.S.

Coordinates: 39°20′30″N 81°40′20″W

Veto is an unincorporated community in Washington County, in the U.S. state of Ohio.

== History ==
A post office was established at Veto in 1850, and remained in operation until 1902.
