= Marietta Township, Washington County, Ohio =

Township in Ohio, US

- Township
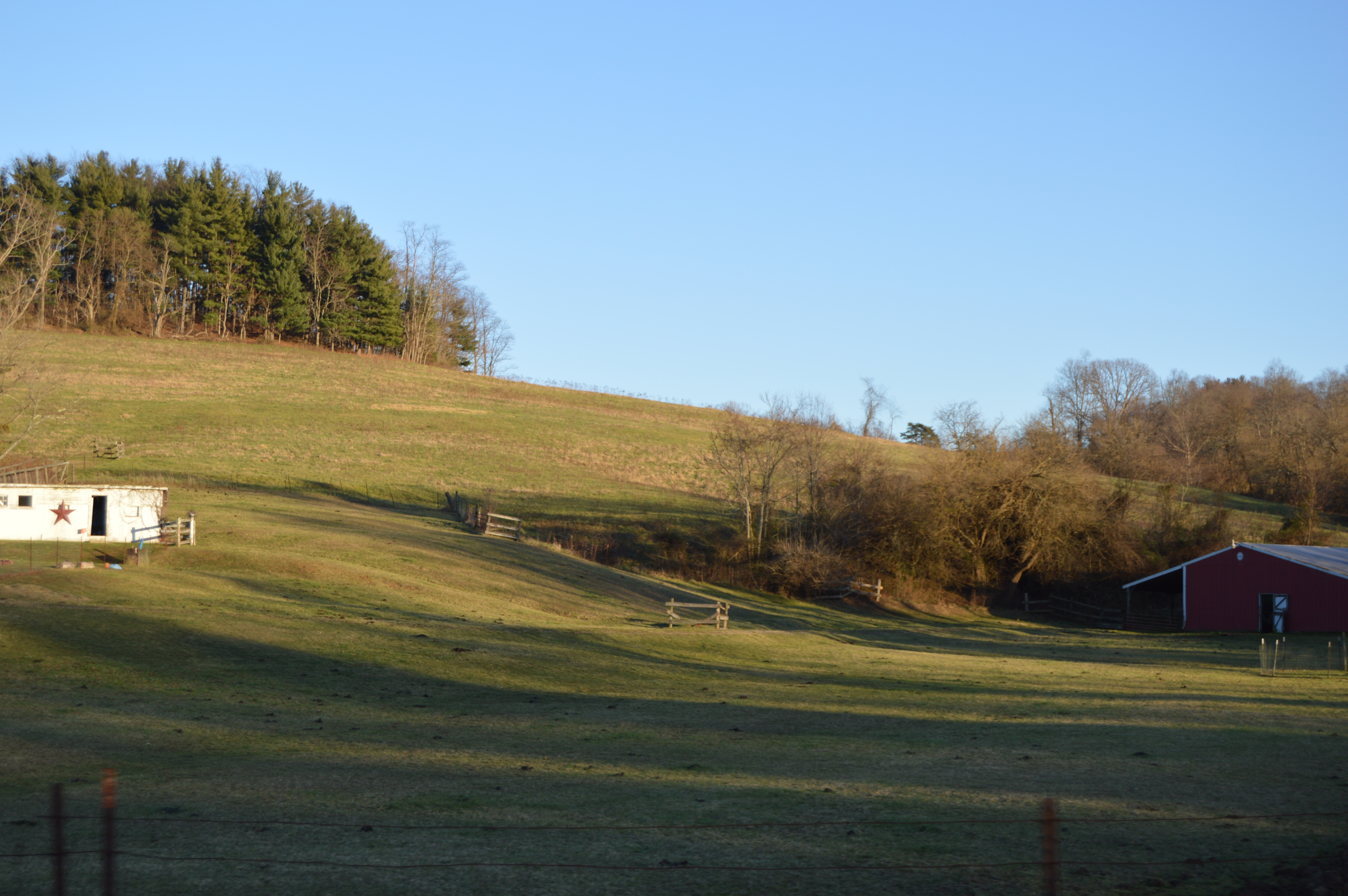
- Fields along State Route 26 northeast of Marietta

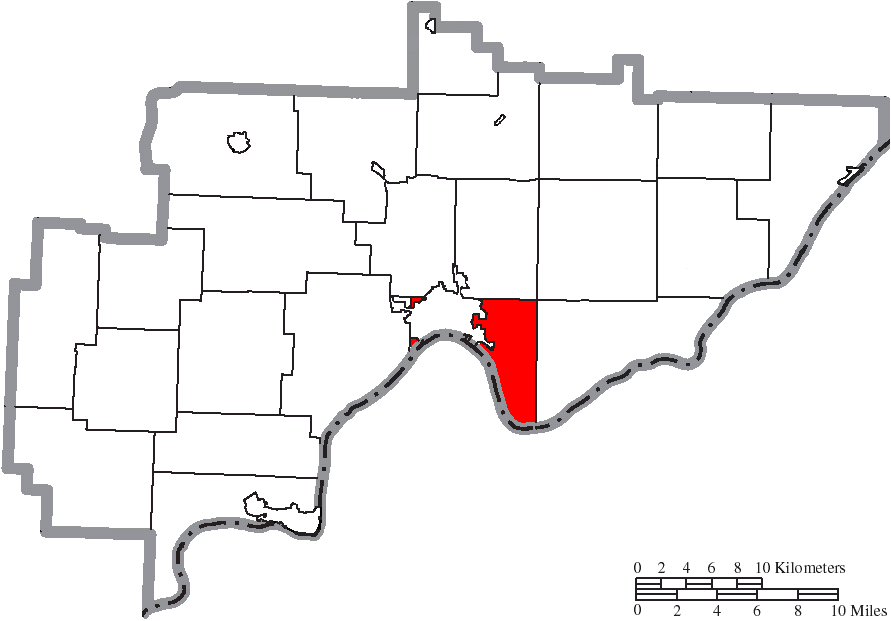
- Location of Marietta Township in Washington County
- Coordinates: 39°23′59″N 81°24′29″W
- Country: United States
- State: Ohio
- County: Washington

Area
  - Total: 15.3 sq mi (39.6 km^{2})
  - Land: 14.9 sq mi (38.7 km^{2})
  - Water: 0.35 sq mi (0.9 km^{2})
- Elevation: 673 ft (205 m)

Population (2020)
  - Total: 4,265
  - Density: 285/sq mi (110.2/km^{2})
- Time zone: UTC-5 (Eastern (EST))
  - Summer (DST): UTC-4 (EDT)
- ZIP code: 45750
- Area code: 740
- FIPS code: 39-47642
- GNIS feature ID: 1087138

Marietta Township is one of the twenty-two townships of Washington County, Ohio, United States. The 2020 census found 4,265 people in the township.

== Geography ==
Located in the southern part of the county along the Ohio River, it borders the following townships:

- Fearing Township - north
- Lawrence Township - northeast corner
- Newport Township - east
- Warren Township - west
- Muskingum Township - northwest

West Virginia lies across the Ohio River to the south: Pleasants County in the far southeast, and Wood County otherwise.

Two populated places are located along the Ohio River in Washington Township: most of the city of Marietta, the county seat of Washington County, in the northwest; and the census-designated place of Reno, in the south.

== Name and history ==
It is the only Marietta Township statewide.

== Government ==
The township is governed by a three-member board of trustees, who are elected in November of odd-numbered years to a four-year term beginning on the following January 1. Two are elected in the year after the presidential election and one is elected in the year before it. There is also an elected township fiscal officer, who serves a four-year term beginning on April 1 of the year after the election, which is held in November of the year before the presidential election. Vacancies in the fiscal officership or on the board of trustees are filled by the remaining trustees.
