= Dalzell, Ohio =

Unincorporated community in Ohio, U.S.

Coordinates: 39°33′53″N 81°18′14″W

Dalzell is an unincorporated community in Washington County, in the U.S. state of Ohio.

== History ==
Dalzell was laid out in 1871, and named for Private Dalzell. A post office called Dalzell was established in 1872, and remained in operation until 1919.
