= Churchtown, Ohio =

Unincorporated community in Ohio, US

Coordinates: 39°28′02″N 81°32′52″W

Churchtown is an unincorporated community in Washington County, in the U.S. state of Ohio. St. John the Baptist Catholic Church, for which the community was named, is the main landmark, as well as St. John Central Grade School, a private Catholic school for grades K-8.

== History ==
A post office was established at Churchtown in 1875, and remained in operation until 1907. The Churchtown post office originally was housed in the Catholic church, for which the town got its name.
