= Dunbar, Ohio =

Unincorporated community in Ohio, U.S.

Coordinates: 39°21′34″N 81°44′30″W

Dunbar is an unincorporated community in Washington County, in the U.S. state of Ohio.

== History ==
A post office called Dunbar was established in 1857, and remained in operation until 1917. The community was named for the local Dunbar family. Shelton Dunbar served as an early postmaster.
