= Cutler, Ohio =

Unincorporated community in Ohio, U.S.

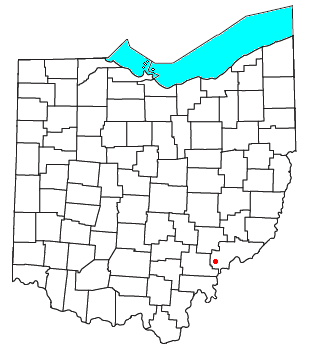
Location of Cutler, Ohio

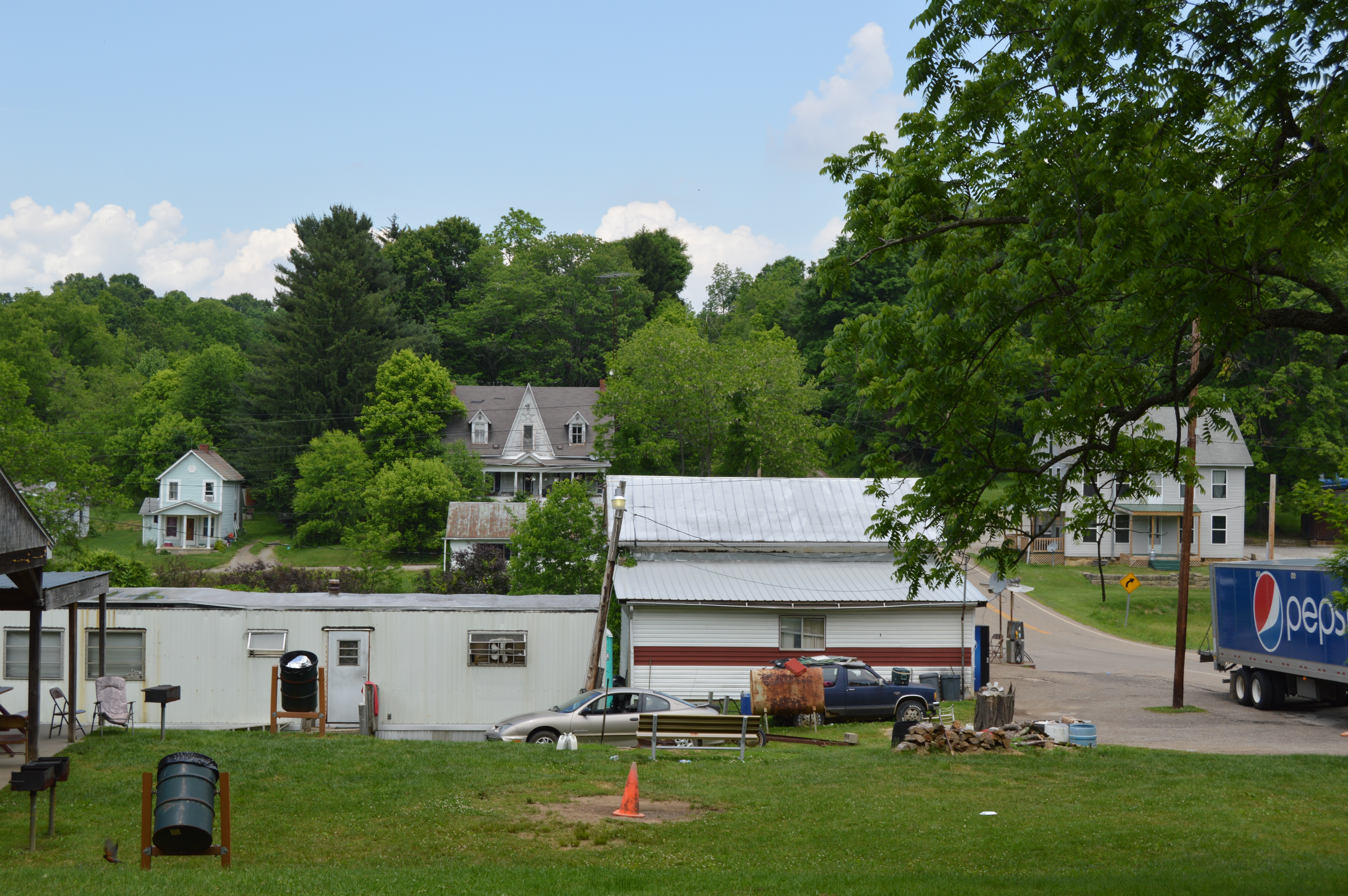
Houses and the general store, seen from the south

Cutler is an unincorporated community in southwestern Fairfield Township, Washington County, Ohio, United States. It has a post office with the ZIP code 45724. It lies at the intersection of State Route 555 and County Road 59 near Gilbert Run, a subsidiary of the Little Hocking River, which meets the Ohio River at Little Hocking to the southeast.

Boord State Nature Preserve (39.391562°N 81.746077°W) is on Fall Run Road, Cutler. It features a hemlock ravine.

== History ==
Cutler was originally called Harshaville, and under the latter name was laid out in 1857, and named for Dr. John M. Harsha, the original owner of the town site. The present name honors William P. Cutler, an early settler. A post office called Cutler has been in operation since 1863. Was recently closed.

== Education ==
Cutler is a part of the Warren Local School System.
