= Luke Chute, Ohio =

Unincorporated community in Ohio, U.S.

Coordinates: 39°32′17″N 81°43′10″W

Luke Chute is an unincorporated community in Washington County, in the U.S. state of Ohio.

== History ==
A post office called Luke Chute was established in 1880, and remained in operation until 1901. According to tradition, the name of the community is derived from the command from a father to his son while hunting, specifically "Luke shoot, or give up the gun".
