= Caywood, Ohio =

Unincorporated community in Ohio, U.S.

Coordinates: 39°27′24″N 81°23′08″W

Caywood (formerly Caywood Station) is an unincorporated community in Washington County, in the U.S. state of Ohio.

== History ==
Caywood had its start in 1871 when the railroad was extended to that point. A post office called Caywood was established in 1871, and remained in operation until 1922. The community was named for the local Caywood family.
