= Tick Ridge, Ohio =

Unincorporated community in Ohio, U.S.

Coordinates: 39°21′32″N 81°42′58″W

Tick Ridge is an unincorporated community in Washington County, in the U.S. state of Ohio.

== History ==
Tick Ridge most likely was so named on account of the frequent wood ticks there.
