= Bevan, Ohio =

Unincorporated community in Ohio, U.S.

Coordinates: 39°24′42″N 81°13′56″W

Bevan is an unincorporated community in Washington County, in the U.S. state of Ohio.

== History ==
A post office called Bevan was established in 1897, and remained in operation until 1932. The Bevan brothers operated a general store there.
