= Pinehurst, Ohio =

Unincorporated community in Ohio, U.S.

Coordinates: 39°24′26″N 81°29′55″W

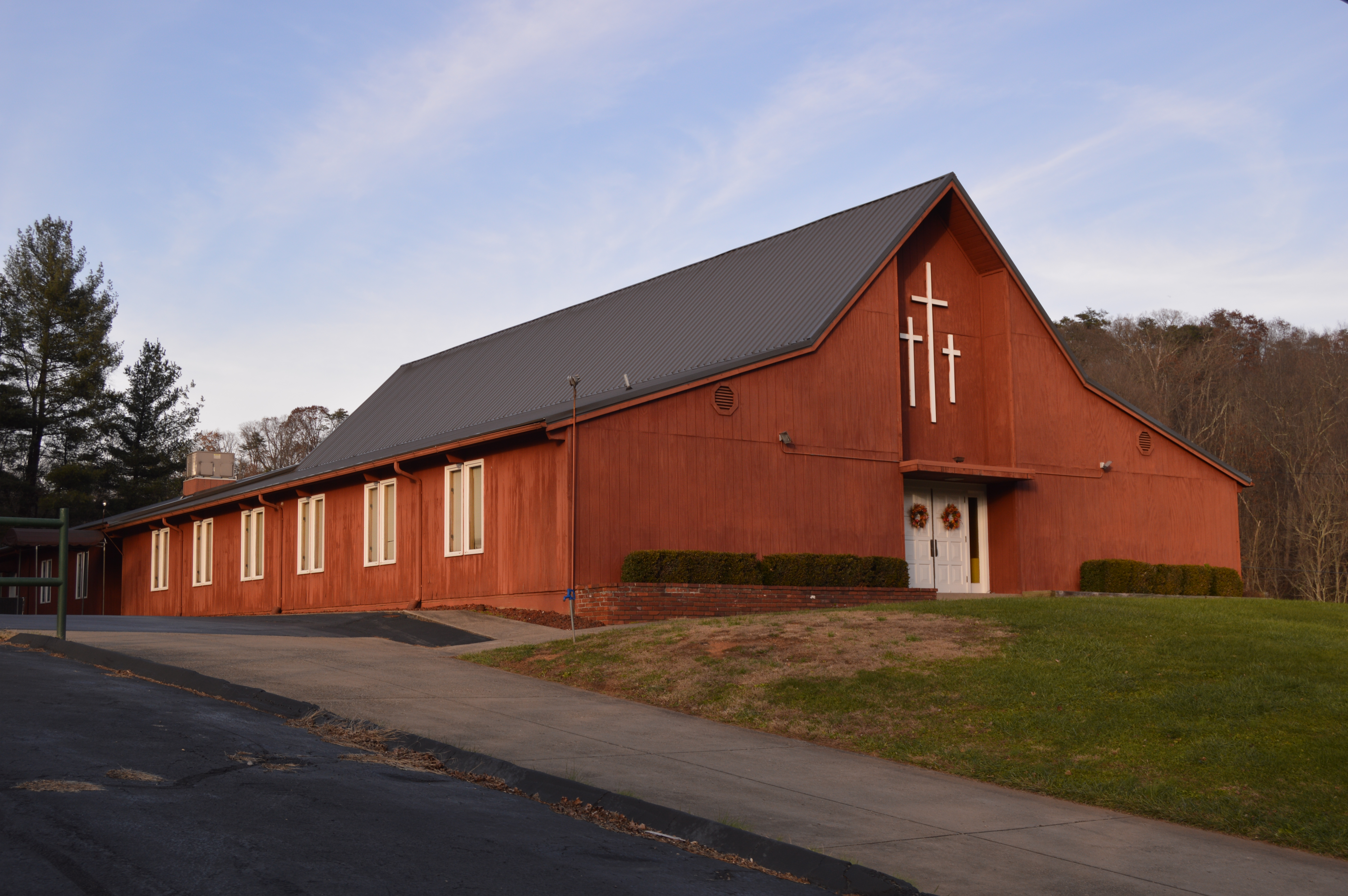
Pinehurst Christian Church

Pinehurst is an unincorporated community in Washington County, in the U.S. state of Ohio.

== History ==
Former variant names were Upper Mile Run and Lower Mile Run; the community adopted the name Pinehurst in the mid-20th century.
