= Moore Junction, Ohio =

Unincorporated community in Ohio, U.S.

Coordinates: 39°22′45″N 81°29′54″W

Moore Junction is an unincorporated community in Washington County, in the U.S. state of Ohio.

== History ==
The community was named after Hon. Thomas Watson Moore, a railroad contractor who was the original owner of the town site.
