= Beavertown, Ohio =

Unincorporated community in Ohio, U.S.

Coordinates: 39°28′21″N 81°06′46″W

Beavertown is an unincorporated community in Washington County, in the U.S. state of Ohio.

== History ==
A large share of the early settlers having the last name Beaver caused the name to be selected.
