= Lower Newport, Ohio =

Unincorporated community in Ohio, U.S.

Coordinates: 39°21′07″N 81°20′42″W

Lower Newport is an unincorporated community in Washington County, in the U.S. state of Ohio.

== History ==
Lower Newport was originally called the "Lower Settlement" in contrast to the "Upper Settlement", i.e. Newport. Lower Newport was a major shipping point for riverboats. A post office called Lower Newport was in operation from 1842 until 1904.
