= Decatur Township, Washington County, Ohio =

Township in Ohio, US

- Township
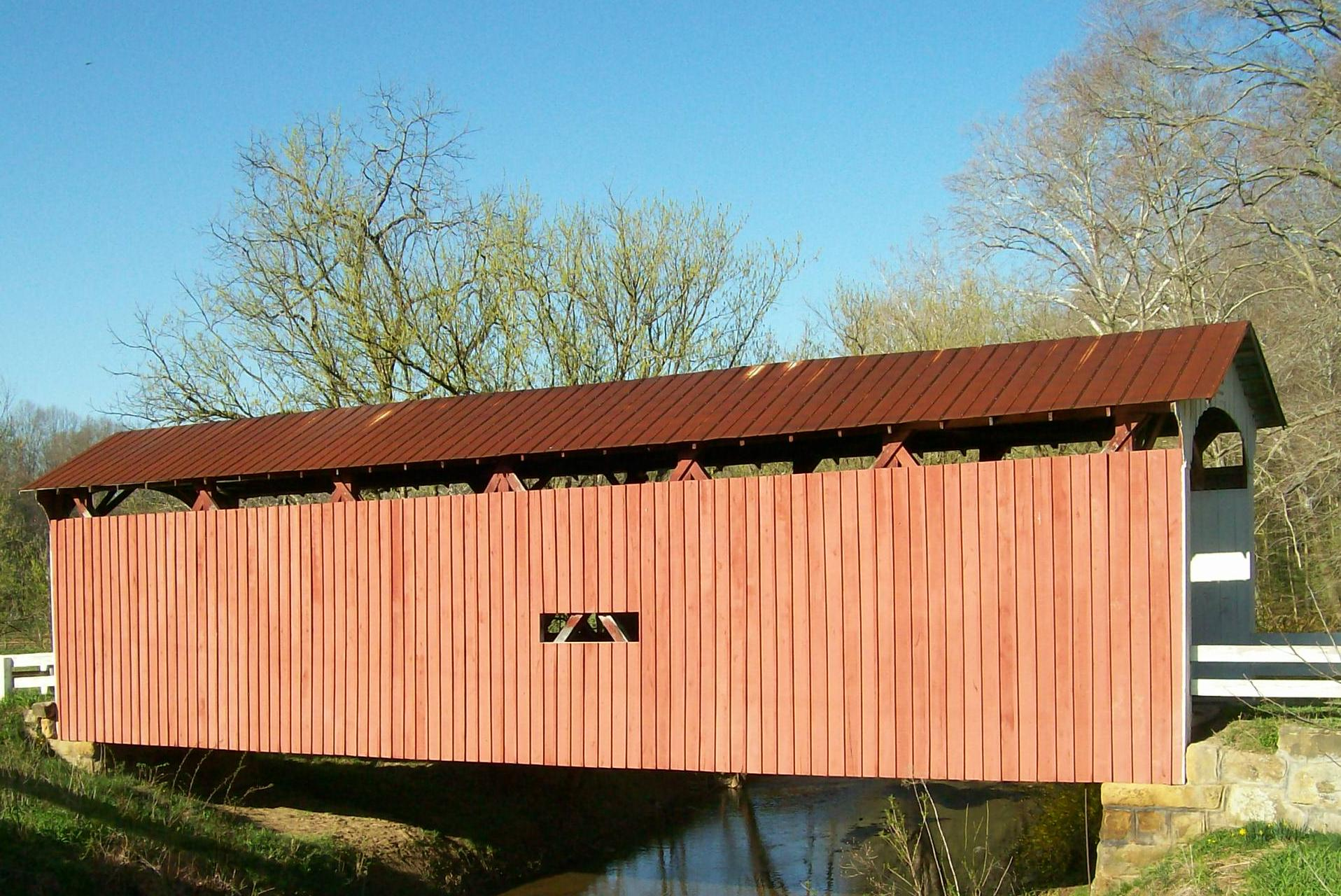
- The Root Covered Bridge

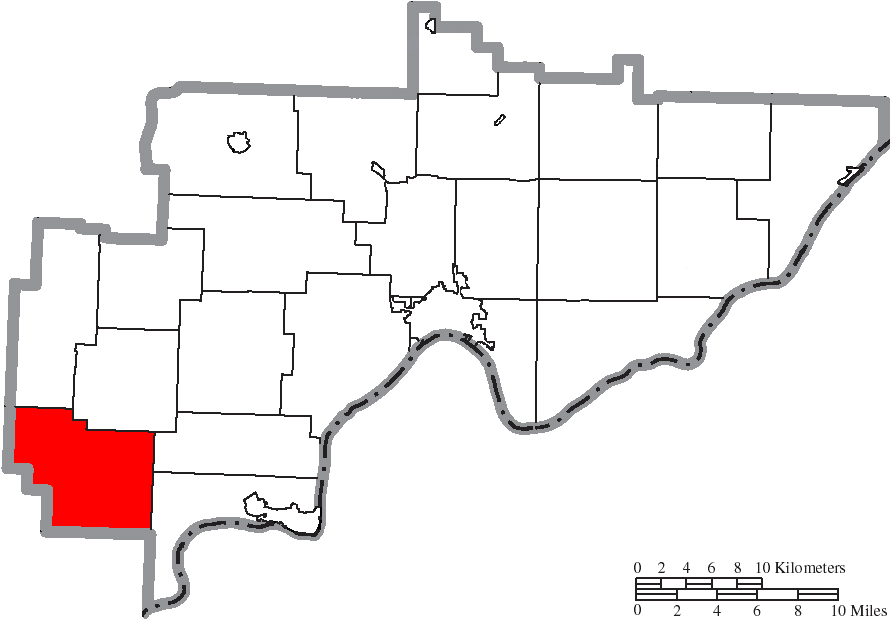
- Location of Decatur Township in Washington County
- Coordinates: 39°18′47″N 81°46′49″W
- Country: United States
- State: Ohio
- County: Washington

Area
  - Total: 35.1 sq mi (91.0 km^{2})
  - Land: 35.1 sq mi (90.9 km^{2})
  - Water: 0 sq mi (0.0 km^{2})
- Elevation: 843 ft (257 m)

Population (2020)
  - Total: 1,342
  - Density: 38.2/sq mi (14.8/km^{2})
- Time zone: UTC-5 (Eastern (EST))
  - Summer (DST): UTC-4 (EDT)
- FIPS code: 39-21098
- GNIS feature ID: 1087129

Decatur Township is one of the twenty-two townships of Washington County, Ohio, United States. The 2020 census found 1,342 people in the township.

== Geography ==
Located in the southwestern corner of the county, it borders the following townships:

- Wesley Township - north
- Fairfield Township - northeast
- Dunham Township - east
- Belpre Township - southeast
- Troy Township, Athens County - south
- Rome Township, Athens County - west
- Bern Township, Athens County - northwest corner

No municipalities are located in Decatur Township.

== Name and history ==
Statewide, the only other Decatur Township is located in Lawrence County.

== Government ==
The township is governed by a three-member board of trustees, who are elected in November of odd-numbered years to a four-year term beginning on the following January 1. Two are elected in the year after the presidential election and one is elected in the year before it. There is also an elected township fiscal officer, who serves a four-year term beginning on April 1 of the year after the election, which is held in November of the year before the presidential election. Vacancies in the fiscal officership or on the board of trustees are filled by the remaining trustees.
