= Oak Grove, Ohio =

Unincorporated community in Ohio, U.S.

Coordinates: 39°26′55″N 81°27′59″W

Oak Grove is an unincorporated community in Washington County, in the U.S. state of Ohio.

The Oak Grove Volunteer Fire Department has served the community since the 1950s.
