= Fillmore, Ohio =

Unincorporated community in Ohio, U.S.

Coordinates: 39°18′12″N 81°44′42″W

Fillmore is an unincorporated community in Washington County, in the U.S. state of Ohio.

== History ==
The first settlement at what is now Fillmore was made in 1816. A post office called Fillmore was established in 1851, and remained in operation until 1905.
