= Newport Township, Washington County, Ohio =

Township in Ohio, US

- Township
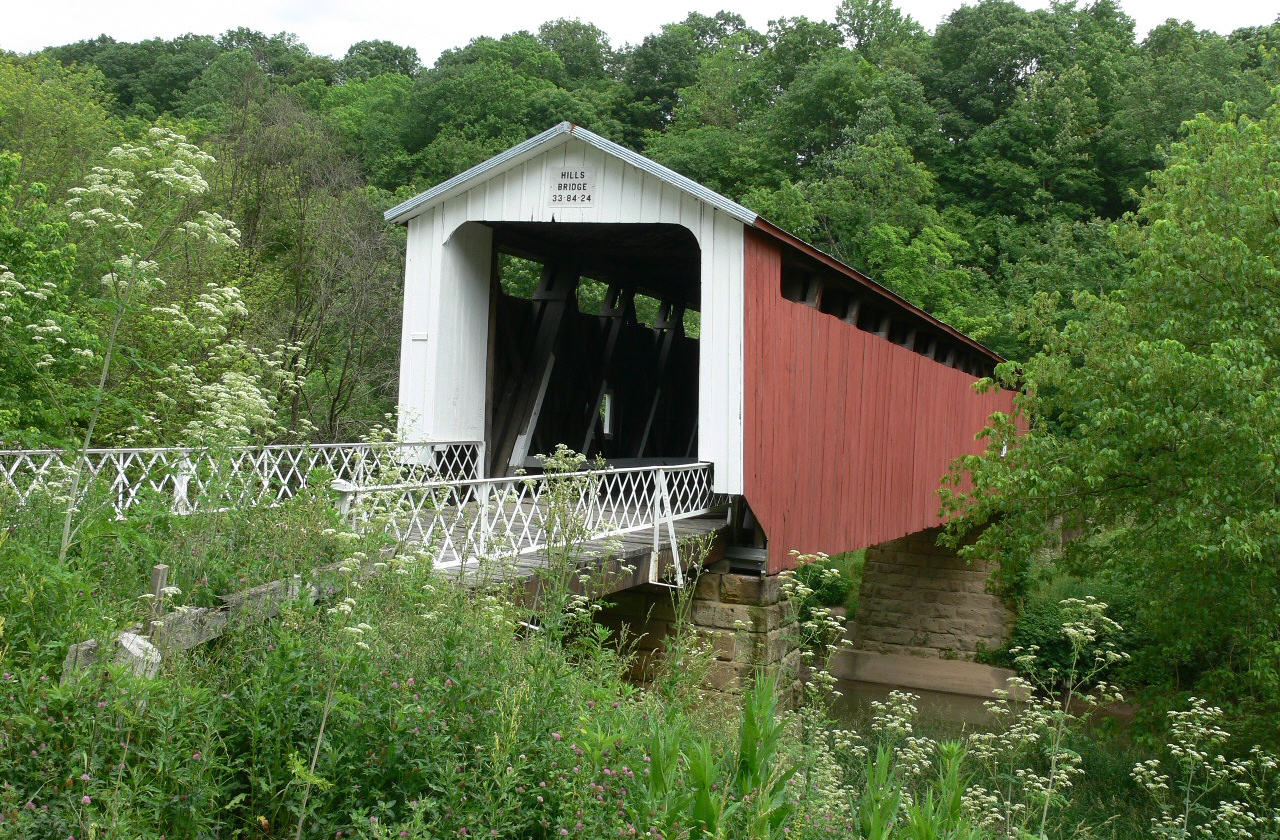
- The Hildreth Bridge, a township landmark

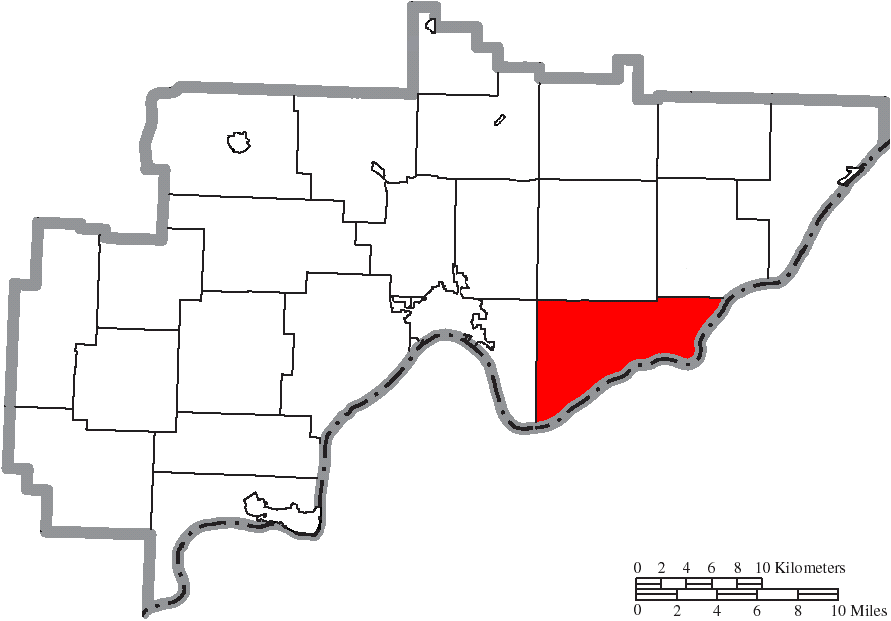
- Location of Newport Township in Washington County
- Coordinates: 39°23′48″N 81°16′25″W
- Country: United States
- State: Ohio
- County: Washington

Area
  - Total: 35.7 sq mi (92.4 km^{2})
  - Land: 35.5 sq mi (92.0 km^{2})
  - Water: 0.12 sq mi (0.3 km^{2})
- Elevation: 994 ft (303 m)

Population (2020)
  - Total: 1,901
  - Density: 54/sq mi (20.7/km^{2})
- Time zone: UTC-5 (Eastern (EST))
  - Summer (DST): UTC-4 (EDT)
- ZIP code: 45768
- Area code: 740
- FIPS code: 39-55356
- GNIS feature ID: 1087141

Newport Township is one of the twenty-two townships of Washington County, Ohio, United States. The 2020 census found 1,901 people in the township.

== Geography ==
Located in the southeastern part of the county along the Ohio River, it borders the following townships:

- Lawrence Township - north
- Independence Township - northeast
- Marietta Township - west
- Fearing Township - northwest corner

Pleasants County, West Virginia lies across the Ohio River to the southeast.

No municipalities are located in Newport Township, although the census-designated place of Newport lies on the township's eastern shoreline.

== Name and history ==
It is the only Newport Township statewide.

In 1833, Newport Township contained a meeting house, several brick school houses, two dry goods stores, and a flour mill.

The Hildreth Covered Bridge in Newport Township is listed on the National Register of Historic Places.

== Government ==
The township is governed by a three-member board of trustees, who are elected in November of odd-numbered years to a four-year term beginning on the following January 1. Two are elected in the year after the presidential election and one is elected in the year before it. There is also an elected township fiscal officer, who serves a four-year term beginning on April 1 of the year after the election, which is held in November of the year before the presidential election. Vacancies in the fiscal officership or on the board of trustees are filled by the remaining trustees.
