= Cow Run (Little Muskingum River tributary) =

Stream in Ohio, United States

Coordinates: 39°26′41″N 81°20′14″W

Cow Run is a stream located entirely within Washington County, Ohio. It is a tributary of the Little Muskingum River.

Cow Run was so named on account of the local cows which frequented a salt lick there.

== See also ==
- List of rivers of Ohio
