= Devola, Ohio =

- CDP
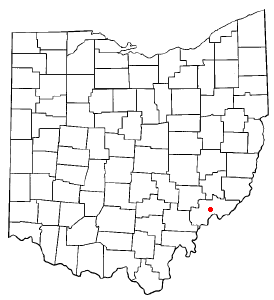
- Location of Devola, Ohio

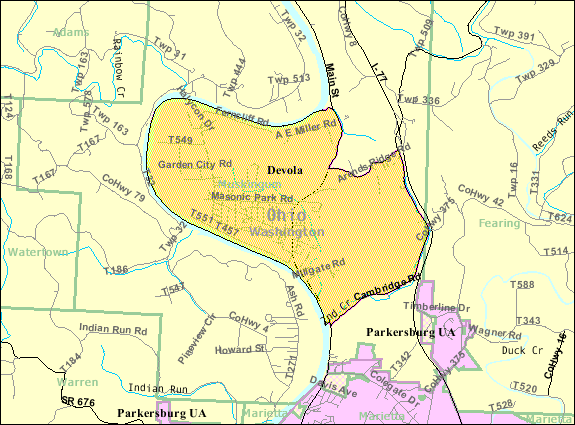
- Detailed map of Devola
- Coordinates: 39°28′35″N 81°29′03″W
- Country: United States
- State: Ohio
- County: Washington

Area
  - Total: 5.40 sq mi (13.98 km^{2})
  - Land: 5.14 sq mi (13.30 km^{2})
  - Water: 0.26 sq mi (0.68 km^{2})
- Elevation: 646 ft (197 m)

Population (2020)
  - Total: 2,639
  - Density: 514.0/sq mi (198.44/km^{2})
- Time zone: UTC-5 (Eastern (EST))
  - Summer (DST): UTC-4 (EDT)
- FIPS code: 39-21868
- GNIS feature ID: 2393396

Devola is a census-designated place (CDP) in Washington County, Ohio, United States, along the Muskingum River. It is part of the Parkersburg-Marietta-Vienna, WV-OH Metropolitan Statistical Area. The population was 2,639 at the 2020 census.

== History ==
The community was named for the local Devol family. Captain Devol built a mill in 1807 at Devol's Dam. A post office called Devols Dam was established in 1881, and remained in operation until 1890.

== Geography ==
According to the United States Census Bureau, the CDP has a total area of 5.4 square miles (14 km^{2}), of which 5.1 square miles (13 km^{2}) is land and 0.2 square miles (0.52 km^{2}) (4.10%) is water.

== Education ==
It is in the Marietta City School District.

Devola had one school local to the region, Putnam Elementary School. It was one of the smaller schools in the district. The school ceased operation in 2020, due to budget cuts of the Marietta City School District. Further education is available in nearby towns, including:

- Marietta Middle School
- Marietta College

== Demographics ==
Historical population
Census	Pop.	Note	%±
2020	2,639		—
U.S. Decennial Census

At the 2000 census there were 2,771 people, 1,065 households, and 803 families living in the CDP. The population density was 539.9 inhabitants per square mile (208.5/km^{2}). There were 1,136 housing units at an average density of 221.4 per square mile (85.5/km^{2}). The racial makeup of the CDP was 97.58% White, 0.07% African American, 1.88% Asian, 0.07% from other races, and 0.40% from two or more races. Hispanic or Latino of any race were 0.11%.

Of the 1,065 households 28.6% had children under the age of 18 living with them, 68.2% were married couples living together, 6.3% had a female householder with no husband present, and 24.6% were non-families. 22.1% of households were one person and 12.2% were one person aged 65 or older. The average household size was 2.46 and the average family size was 2.88.

The age distribution was 22.4% under the age of 18, 6.1% from 18 to 24, 22.4% from 25 to 44, 26.9% from 45 to 64, and 22.2% 65 or older. The median age was 44 years. For every 100 females there were 93.1 males. For every 100 females age 18 and over, there were 88.3 males.

The median household income was $48,558 and the median family income was $58,214. Males had a median income of $39,028 versus $26,833 for females. The per capita income for the CDP was $24,751. About 3.4% of families and 4.5% of the population were below the poverty line, including 7.8% of those under age 18 and 4.8% of those age 65 or over.
