= Independence Township, Washington County, Ohio =

Township in Ohio, US

- Township
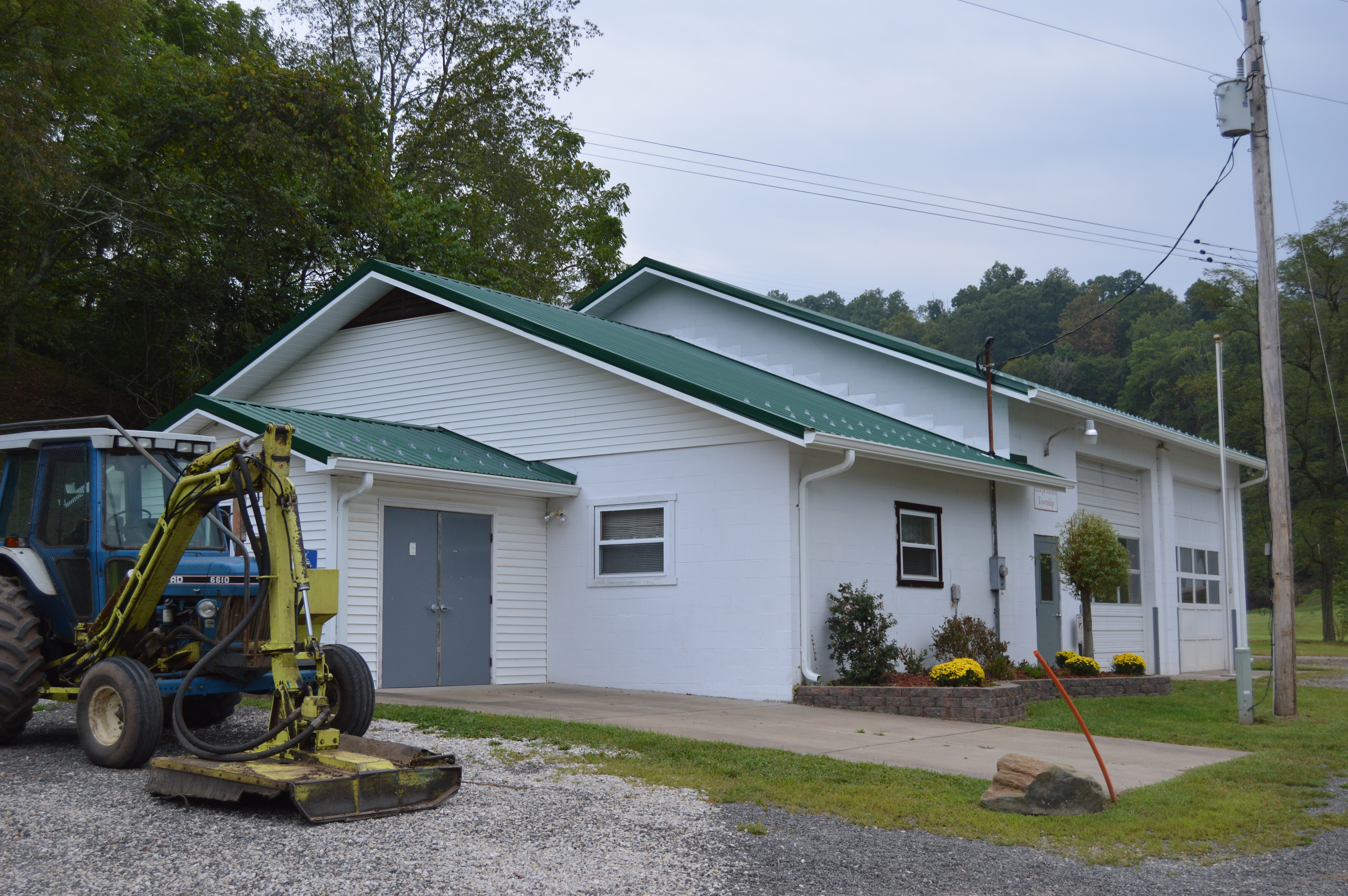
- Township hall at Archer's Fork

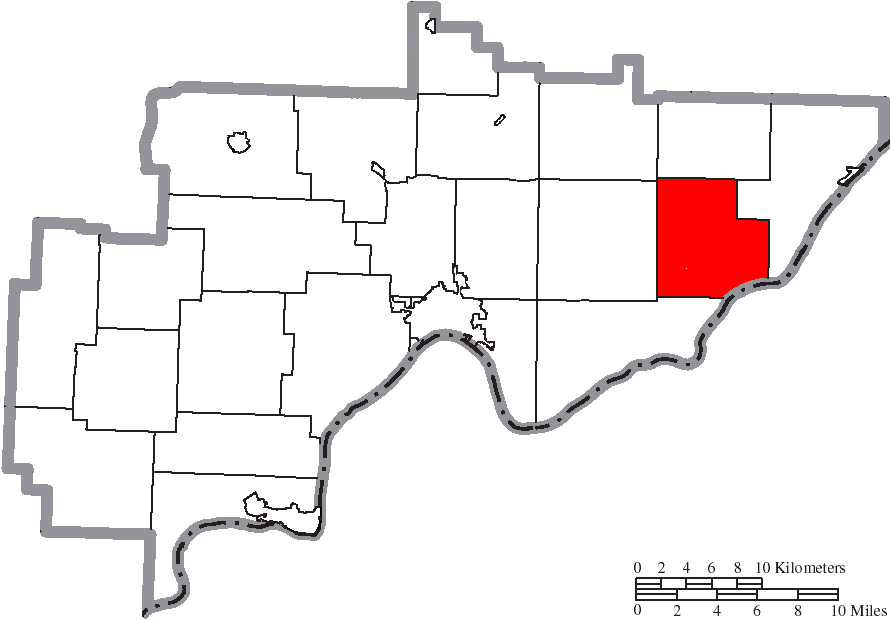
- Location of Independence Township in Washington County
- Coordinates: 39°28′36″N 81°11′49″W
- Country: United States
- State: Ohio
- County: Washington

Area
  - Total: 28.5 sq mi (73.8 km^{2})
  - Land: 28.5 sq mi (73.7 km^{2})
  - Water: 0.039 sq mi (0.1 km^{2})
- Elevation: 955 ft (291 m)

Population (2020)
  - Total: 315
  - Density: 11/sq mi (4.3/km^{2})
- Time zone: UTC-5 (Eastern (EST))
  - Summer (DST): UTC-4 (EDT)
- FIPS code: 39-37268
- GNIS feature ID: 1087134

Independence Township is one of the twenty-two townships of Washington County, Ohio, United States. The 2020 census found 315 people in the township.

== Geography ==
Located in the eastern part of the county along the Ohio River, it borders the following townships:

- Ludlow Township - north
- Grandview Township - east
- Newport Township - south
- Lawrence Township - west
- Liberty Township - northwest

Pleasants County, West Virginia lies across the Ohio River to the southeast.

No municipalities are located in Independence Township.

== Name and history ==
Independence Township was established in 1840. It is the only Independence Township statewide.

== Government ==
The township is governed by a three-member board of trustees, who are elected in November of odd-numbered years to a four-year term beginning on the following January 1. Two are elected in the year after the presidential election and one is elected in the year before it. There is also an elected township fiscal officer, who serves a four-year term beginning on April 1 of the year after the election, which is held in November of the year before the presidential election. Vacancies in the fiscal officership or on the board of trustees are filled by the remaining trustees.
