= Sitka, Ohio =

Unincorporated community in Ohio, U.S.

Coordinates: 39°26′52″N 81°20′18″W

Sitka is an unincorporated community in Washington County, in the U.S. state of Ohio.

== History ==
A post office called Sitka operated between 1890 and 1916. The community was named after Sitka, Alaska, where a local mother's son had drowned while serving in the U.S. Army. This individual was Joseph T. Bukey, and according to a history of Washington County, Ohio published less than a decade later was serving in Alaska at the time of his accidental drowning.
