= Marietta High School (Ohio) =

Location
- 115 Academy Drive; Marietta, Ohio, 45750; United States; 39°26′22″N 81°27′14″W

Information
- Type: Public
- Established: 1853
- School district: Marietta City School District
- Principal: Garrett Davis
- Teaching staff: 58.00 (FTE)
- Grades: 7-12
- Enrollment: 1,028 (2023–2024)
- Student to teacher ratio: 17.72
- Campus type: Suburban
- Colors: Orange and black
- Song: On, Marietta
- Athletics conference: Tri-Valley Conference (Ohio)
- Mascot: Tabby the Tiger
- Nickname: Etta
- Rival: Warren High School
- Newspaper: MHS the Original
- Yearbook: The Orian
- Website: Official website

Marietta High School (MHS) is a six-year, public, secondary school in Marietta, Ohio, United States. The school serves students in the Marietta City School District in grades seven through twelve. As of 2023–2024, the enrollment is 1,028 students. Marietta's mascot is Tabby the Tiger and its colors are orange and black. The school participates in both the Tri-Valley Conference (Ohio).

MHS is accredited by the North Central Association of Colleges and Secondary Schools and the Ohio Department of Education.

== In the media ==
An altered sign at the school was shown on The Ellen DeGeneres Show in the segment "What's Wrong With These Signs?"

== Notable alumni ==
- Andrew Cayton, noted historian and professor of early America
- Turner Hill, baseball player for the San Francisco Giants
- Brian T. Moynihan (class of 1977), chairman and CEO of Bank of America, chancellor of Brown University
- Andy Thompson (class of 1981), Ohio state representative
