= Barlow Township, Ohio =

Township in Ohio, US

Barlow Township, Washington County, Ohio
- Township
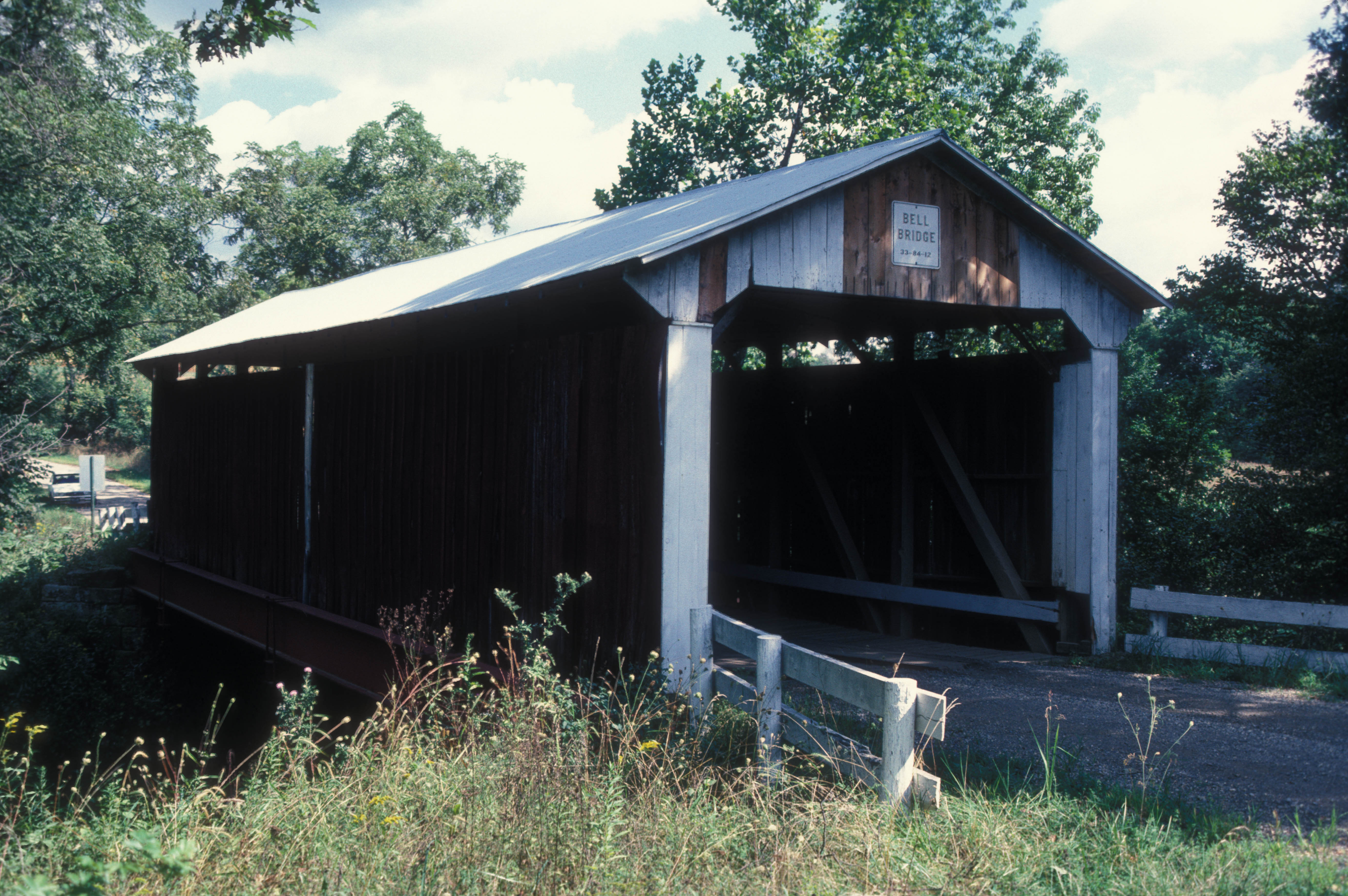
- The Bell Covered Bridge

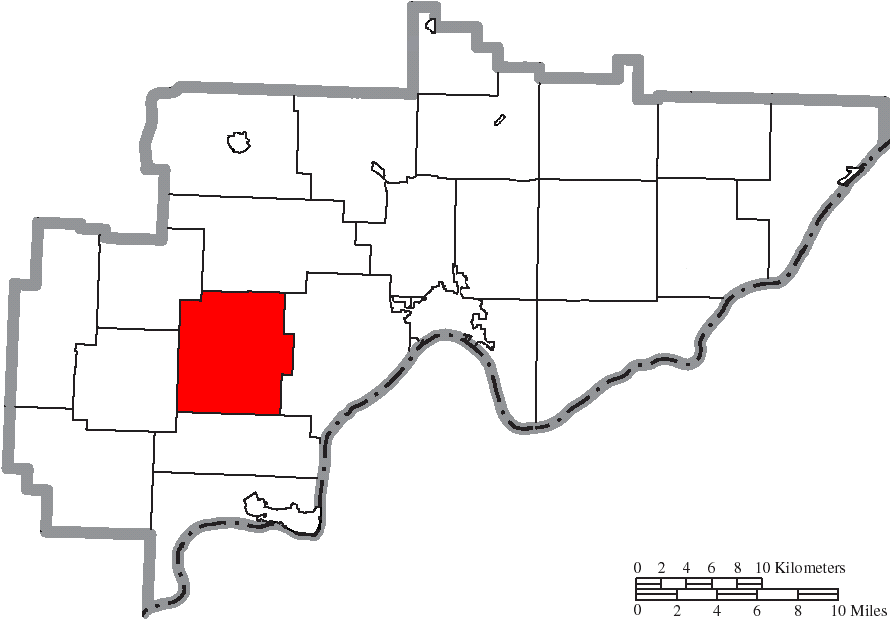
- Location of Barlow Township in Washington County
- Coordinates: 39°23′36″N 81°39′7″W
- Country: United States
- State: Ohio
- County: Washington

Area
  - Total: 31.8 sq mi (82.3 km^{2})
  - Land: 31.7 sq mi (82.2 km^{2})
  - Water: 0 sq mi (0.0 km^{2})
- Elevation: 837 ft (255 m)

Population (2020)
  - Total: 2,560
  - Density: 80.7/sq mi (31.1/km^{2})
- Time zone: UTC-5 (Eastern (EST))
  - Summer (DST): UTC-4 (EDT)
- ZIP code: 45712
- Area code: 740
- FIPS code: 39-03898
- GNIS feature ID: 1087126
- Website: https://www.barlowtwp.us/

Barlow Township is one of the twenty-two townships of Washington County, Ohio, United States. The 2020 census found 2,560 people in the township.

== Geography ==
Located in the western part of the county, it borders the following townships:

- Watertown Township - north
- Warren Township - east
- Dunham Township - south
- Fairfield Township - west
- Palmer Township - northwest

No municipalities are located in Barlow Township, although the unincorporated communities of Barlow and Vincent lie in the township's west and south respectively.

== Name and history ==
It is the only Barlow Township statewide, although there is a Bartlow Township in Henry County.

== Government ==
The township is governed by a three-member board of trustees, who are elected in November of odd-numbered years to a four-year term beginning on the following January 1. Two are elected in the year after the presidential election and one is elected in the year before it. There is also an elected township fiscal officer, who serves a four-year term beginning on April 1 of the year after the election, which is held in November of the year before the presidential election. Vacancies in the fiscal officership or on the board of trustees are filled by the remaining trustees.
