= Stanleyville, Ohio =

Unincorporated community in Ohio, U.S.

Coordinates: 39°28′19″N 81°24′40″W

Stanleyville is an unincorporated community in Washington County, in the U.S. state of Ohio.

== History ==
Thomas Stanley built the first mill at Stanleyville around 1811. The community that sprang was named for pioneer Thomas Stanley. A post office called Stanleyville was established in 1878, and remained in operation until 1933.
