= Lawrence Township, Washington County, Ohio =

Township in Ohio, US

- Township
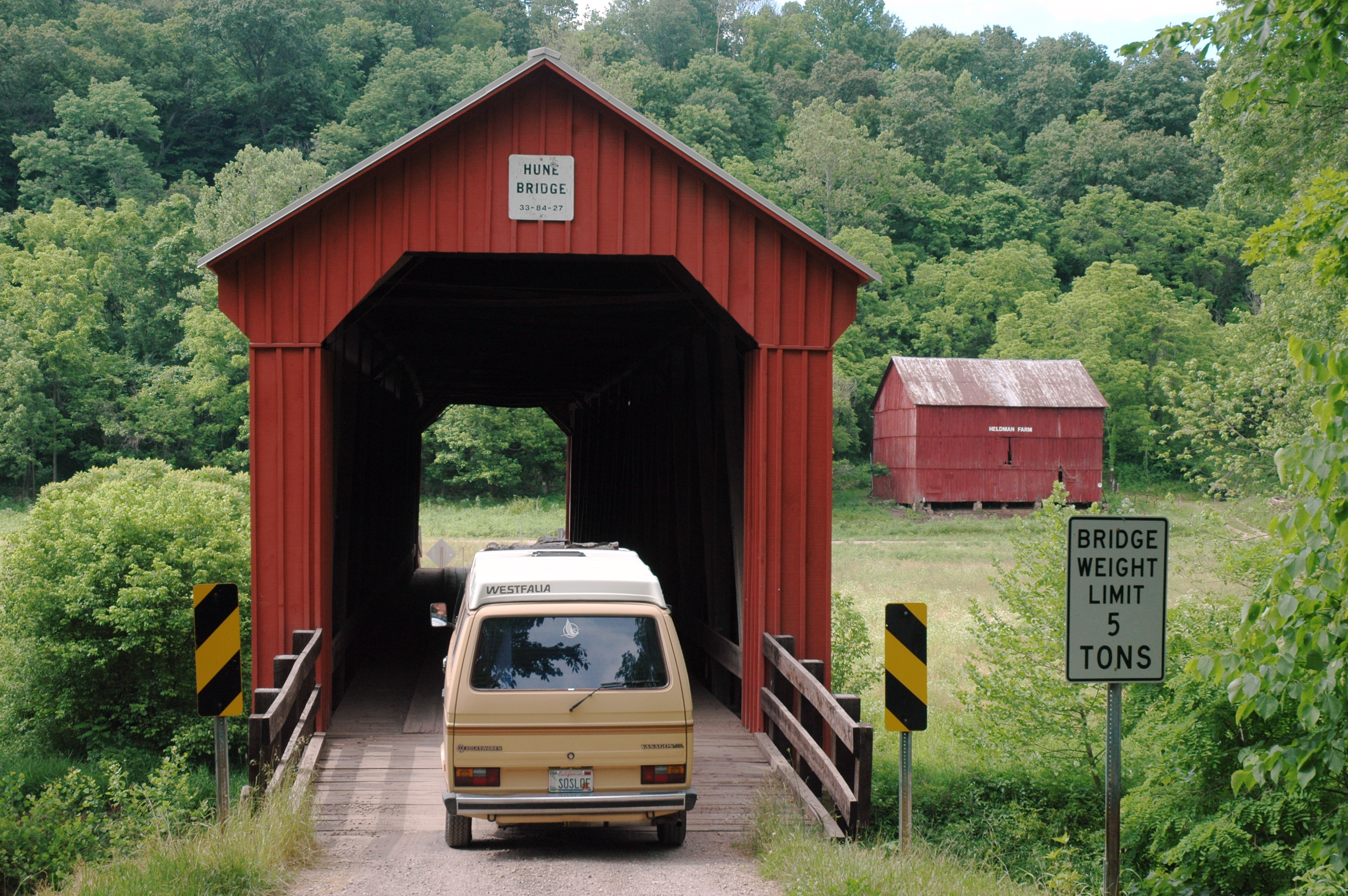
- The Hune Covered Bridge, a township landmark

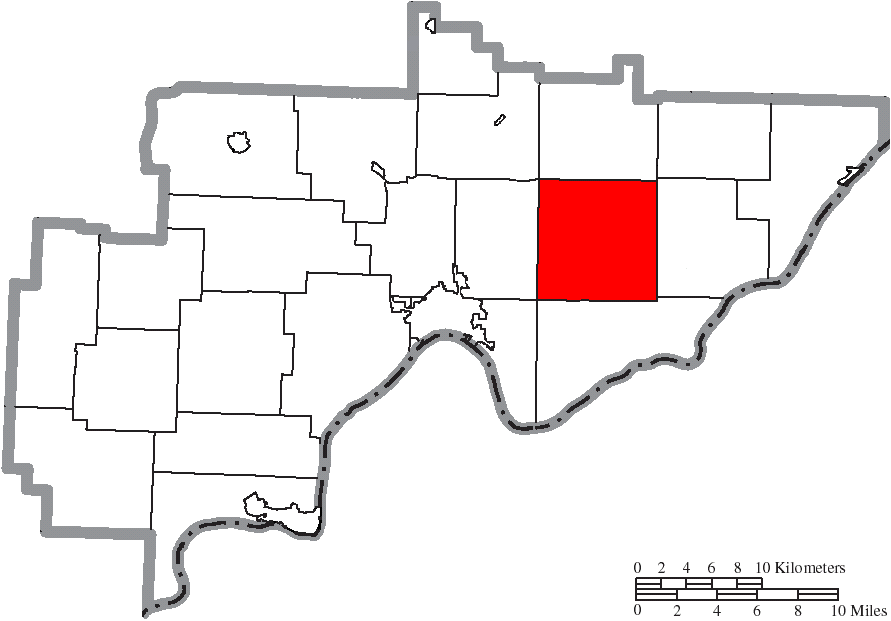
- Location of Lawrence Township in Washington County
- Coordinates: 39°28′40″N 81°17′36″W
- Country: United States
- State: Ohio
- County: Washington

Area
  - Total: 35.3 sq mi (91.3 km^{2})
  - Land: 35.3 sq mi (91.3 km^{2})
  - Water: 0 sq mi (0.0 km^{2})
- Elevation: 614 ft (187 m)

Population (2020)
  - Total: 824
  - Density: 23.4/sq mi (9.03/km^{2})
- Time zone: UTC-5 (Eastern (EST))
  - Summer (DST): UTC-4 (EDT)
- FIPS code: 39-42196
- GNIS feature ID: 1087135

Lawrence Township is one of the twenty-two townships of Washington County, Ohio, United States. The 2020 census found 824 people in the township.

== Geography ==
Located in the eastern part of the county, it borders the following townships:

- Liberty Township - north
- Independence Township - east
- Newport Township - south
- Marietta Township - southwest corner
- Fearing Township - west
- Salem Township - northwest corner

No municipalities are located in Lawrence Township.

== Name and history ==
Statewide, other Lawrence Townships are located in Lawrence, Stark, and Tuscarawas counties.

Northeastern Lawrence Township is the location of the Hune Covered Bridge, which is listed on the National Register of Historic Places.

== Government ==
The township is governed by a three-member board of trustees, who are elected in November of odd-numbered years to a four-year term beginning on the following January 1. Two are elected in the year after the presidential election and one is elected in the year before it. There is also an elected township fiscal officer, who serves a four-year term beginning on April 1 of the year after the election, which is held in November of the year before the presidential election. Vacancies in the fiscal officership or on the board of trustees are filled by the remaining trustees.
