= Dunham Township, Ohio =

Township in Ohio, US

Dunham Township, Washington County, Ohio
- Township
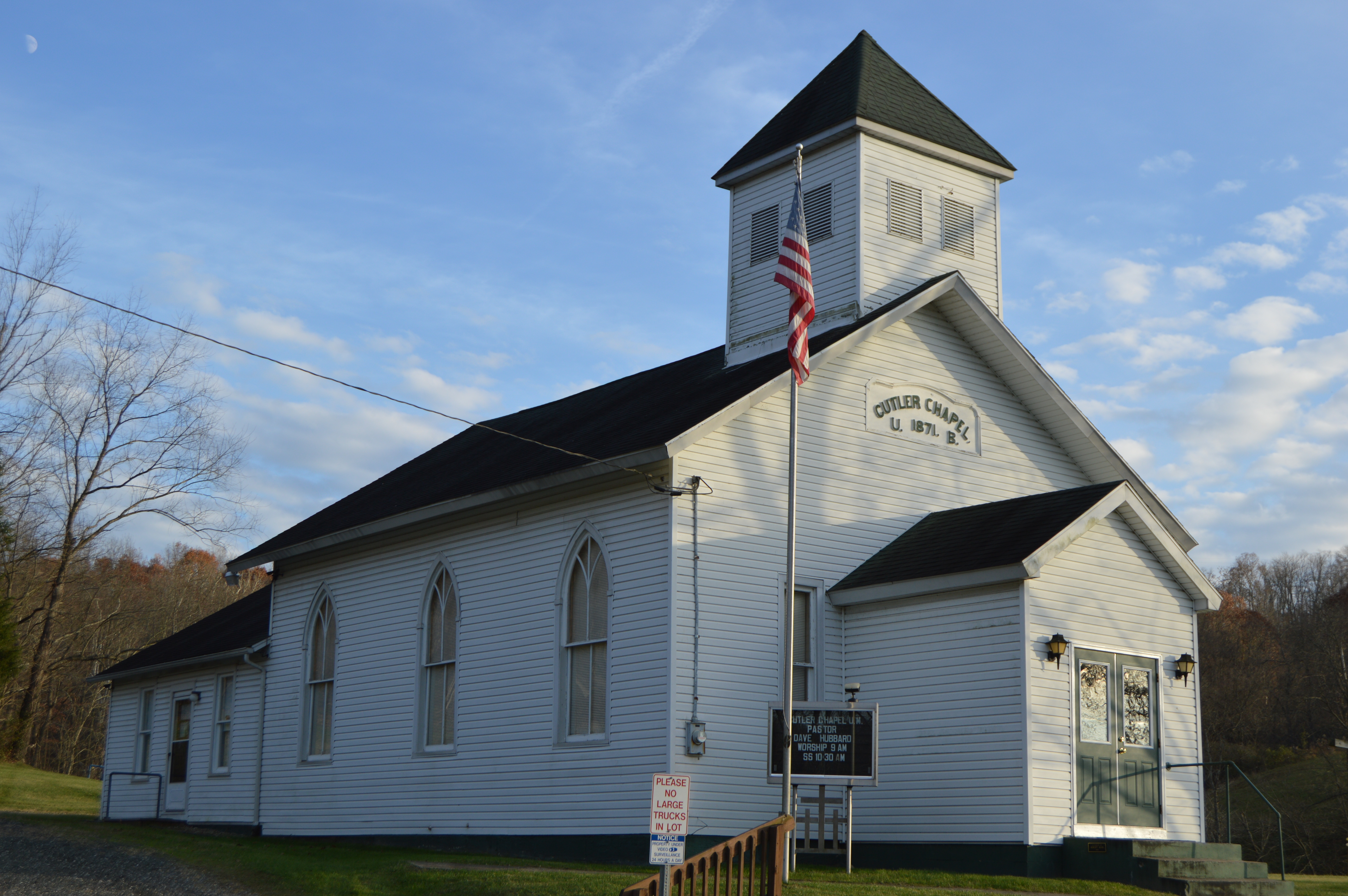
- Cutler Chapel in the township's northeast

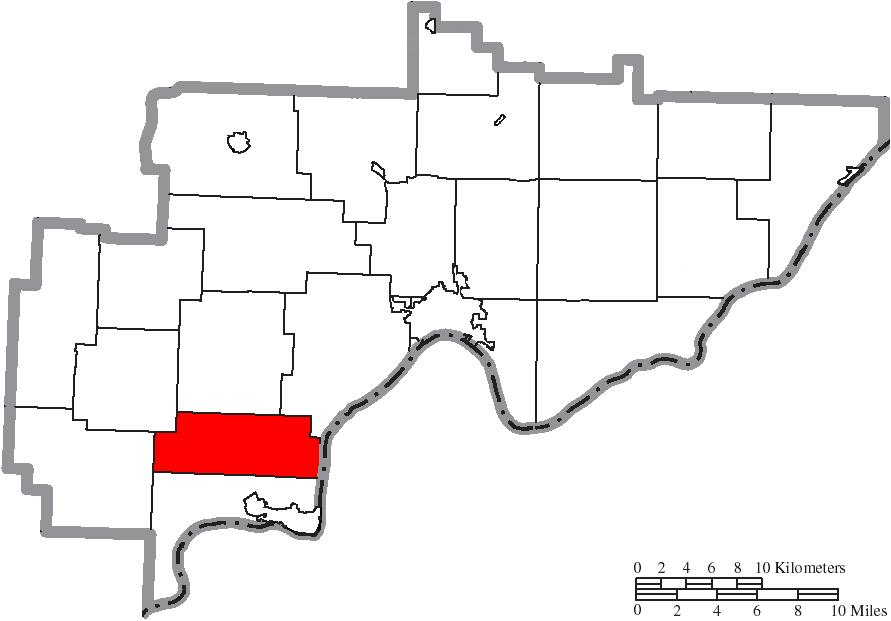
- Location of Dunham Township in Washington County
- Coordinates: 39°20′3″N 81°37′49″W
- Country: United States
- State: Ohio
- County: Washington

Area
  - Total: 23.7 sq mi (61.3 km^{2})
  - Land: 23.4 sq mi (60.5 km^{2})
  - Water: 0.31 sq mi (0.8 km^{2})
- Elevation: 696 ft (212 m)

Population (2020)
  - Total: 2,581
  - Density: 111/sq mi (42.7/km^{2})
- Time zone: UTC-5 (Eastern (EST))
  - Summer (DST): UTC-4 (EDT)
- FIPS code: 39-22918
- GNIS feature ID: 1087130

Dunham Township is one of the twenty-two townships of Washington County, Ohio, United States. The 2020 census found 2,581 people in the township.

== Geography ==
Located in the southwestern part of the county along the Ohio River, it borders the following townships:

- Barlow Township - north
- Warren Township - northeast
- Belpre Township - south
- Decatur Township - west
- Fairfield Township - northwest

Wood County, West Virginia lies across the Ohio River to the east.

No municipalities are located in Dunham Township.

== Name and history ==
It is the only Dunham Township statewide.

== Government ==
The township is governed by a three-member board of trustees, who are elected in November of odd-numbered years to a four-year term beginning on the following January 1. Two are elected in the year after the presidential election and one is elected in the year before it. There is also an elected township fiscal officer, who serves a four-year term beginning on April 1 of the year after the election, which is held in November of the year before the presidential election. Vacancies in the fiscal officership or on the board of trustees are filled by the remaining trustees.
