= Barlow, Ohio =

Unincorporated community in Ohio, U.S.

Coordinates: 39°23′55″N 81°39′53″W

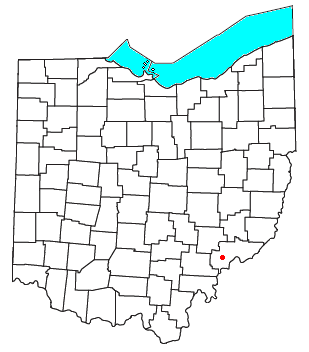
Location of Barlow, Ohio

Barlow is an unincorporated community in western Barlow Township, Washington County, Ohio, United States. Although it is unincorporated, it has a ZIP code 45712. It lies at the intersection of State Routes 339 and 550 near the South Fork of Wolf Creek, which meets the Muskingum River at Waterford to the north.

== History ==
Barlow was platted in 1840.

== Education ==
Barlow has a public library, a branch of the Washington County Public Library.
