= Warner, Ohio =

Unincorporated community in Ohio, U.S.

Coordinates: 39°33′46″N 81°25′05″W

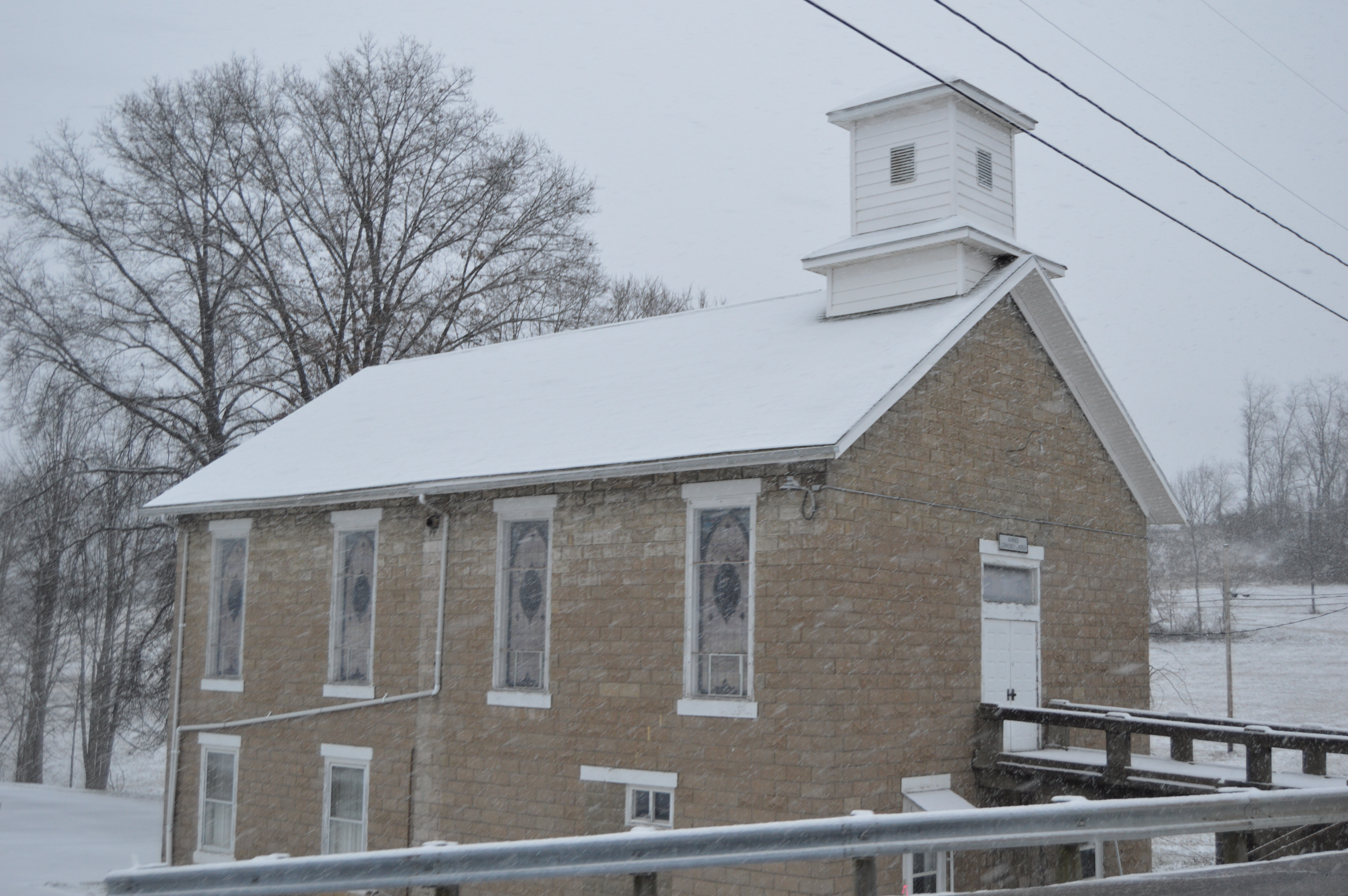
Community church on State Route 821

Warner is an unincorporated community in Washington County, in the U.S. state of Ohio.

== History ==
A post office called Warner was established in 1871. Warner was laid out around 1873, and named for General A. J. Warner.
