= Fairfield Township, Washington County, Ohio =

Township in Ohio, US

- Township
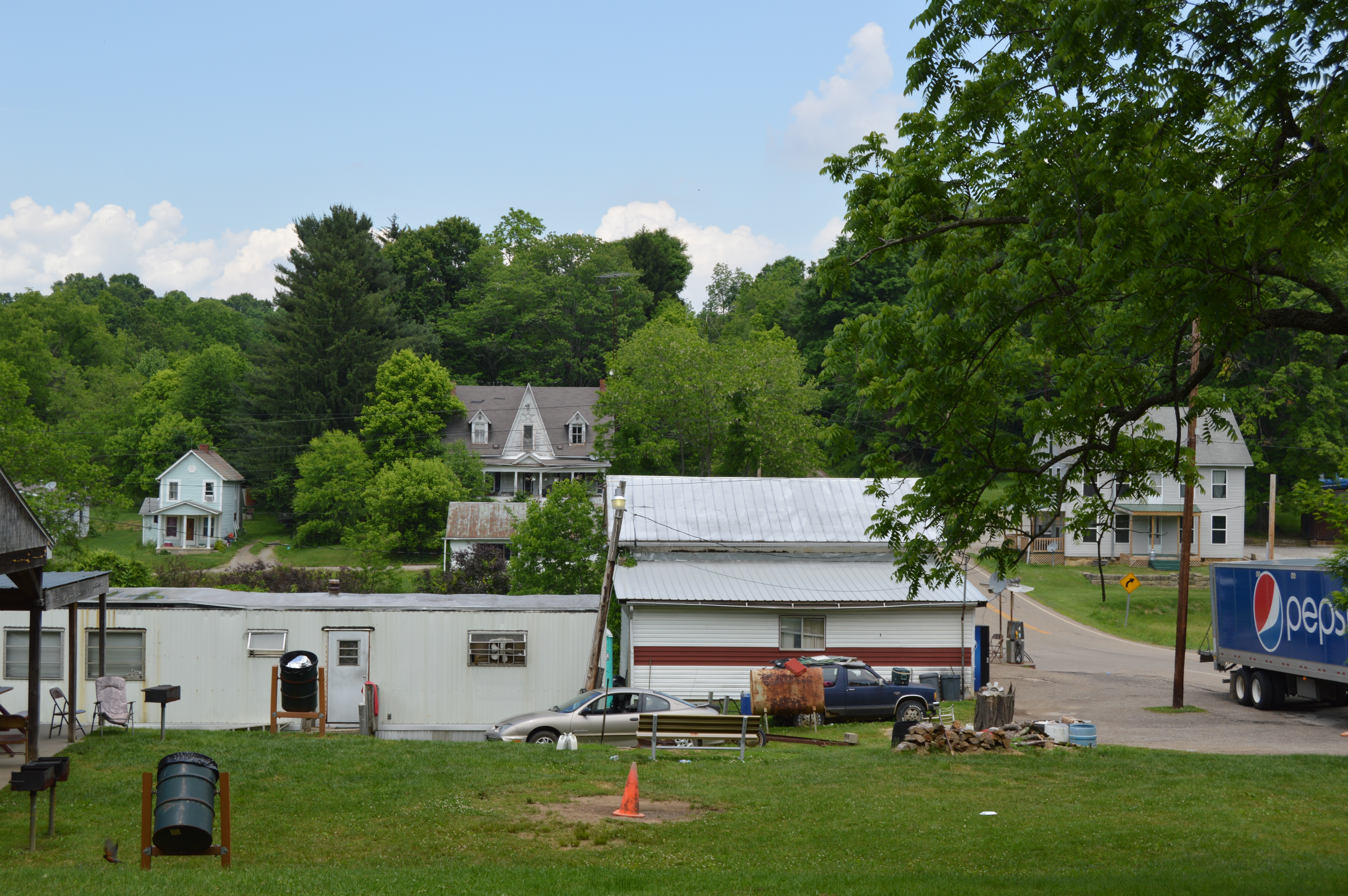
- Overview of Cutler

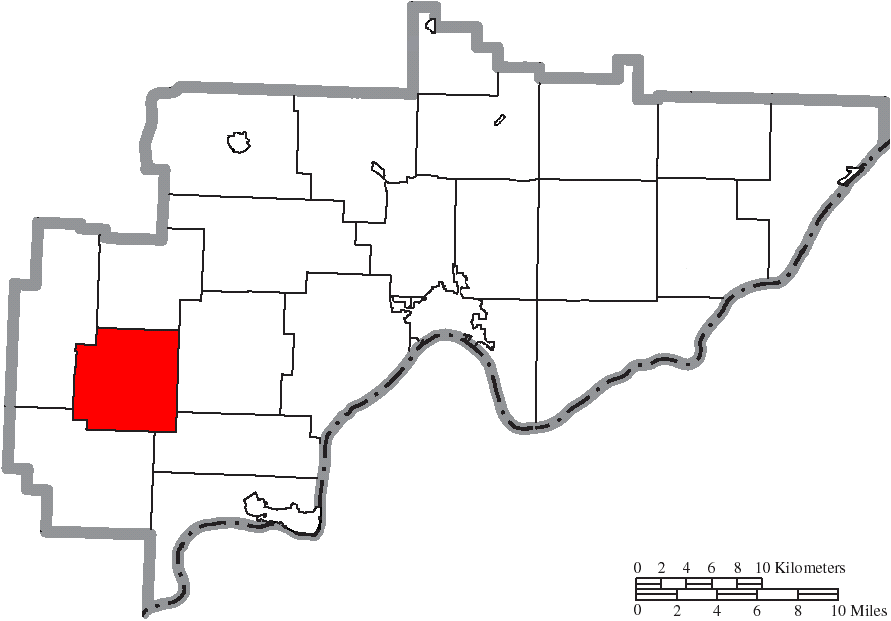
- Location of Fairfield Township in Washington County
- Coordinates: 39°22′23″N 81°45′34″W
- Country: United States
- State: Ohio
- County: Washington

Area
  - Total: 24.6 sq mi (63.7 km^{2})
  - Land: 24.6 sq mi (63.7 km^{2})
  - Water: 0 sq mi (0.0 km^{2})
- Elevation: 850 ft (259 m)

Population (2020)
  - Total: 1,133
  - Density: 46.1/sq mi (17.8/km^{2})
- Time zone: UTC-5 (Eastern (EST))
  - Summer (DST): UTC-4 (EDT)
- FIPS code: 39-26096
- GNIS feature ID: 1087131

Fairfield Township is one of the twenty-two townships of Washington County, Ohio, United States. The 2020 census found 1,133 people in the township.

== Geography ==
Located in the western part of the county, it borders the following townships:

- Palmer Township - north
- Barlow Township - east
- Dunham Township - southeast
- Decatur Township - south
- Wesley Township - west

No municipalities are located in Fairfield Township, although the unincorporated community of Cutler lies in the township's southwest.

== Name and history ==
It is one of seven Fairfield Townships statewide.

== Government ==
The township is governed by a three-member board of trustees, who are elected in November of odd-numbered years to a four-year term beginning on the following January 1. Two are elected in the year after the presidential election and one is elected in the year before it. There is also an elected township fiscal officer, who serves a four-year term beginning on April 1 of the year after the election, which is held in November of the year before the presidential election. Vacancies in the fiscal officership or on the board of trustees are filled by the remaining trustees.
