= National Register of Historic Places listings in Washington County, Ohio =

Location of Washington County in Ohio

This is a list of the National Register of Historic Places listings in Washington County, Ohio.

This is intended to be a complete list of the properties and districts on the National Register of Historic Places in Washington County, Ohio, United States. The locations of National Register properties and districts for which the latitude and longitude coordinates are included below, may be seen in a Google map.

There are 37 properties and districts listed on the National Register in the county, including 1 National Historic Landmark.

This National Park Service list is complete through NPS recent listings posted April 24, 2026.

== Current listings ==
	Name on the Register	Image	Date listed	Location	City or town	Description
1	Charles Rice Ames House	Charles Rice Ames House	February 14, 1978 (#78002208)	2212 Miller Ave. 39°16′59″N 81°36′21″W	Belpre	
2	Col. Joseph Barker House	Col. Joseph Barker House	June 23, 1978 (#78002210)	North of Marietta on Masonic Park Rd. 39°29′11″N 81°29′19″W	Muskingum Township	
3	Judge Joseph Barker Jr. House	Judge Joseph Barker Jr. House	July 26, 1979 (#79001979)	Southwest of Newport on State Route 7; 39°21′29″N 81°19′45″W	Newport Township	
4	Becker Lumber and Manufacturing Company	Becker Lumber and Manufacturing Company	June 18, 1987 (#87000988)	121 Pike St. 39°24′55″N 81°26′28″W	Marietta	
5	Bell Covered Bridge	Bell Covered Bridge	October 3, 2012 (#12000836)	Bell Rd., north of Vincent; 39°25′52″N 81°40′34″W	Barlow Township	
6	Cisler Terrace	Cisler Terrace	January 19, 1983 (#83002065)	7th and Ephraim Cutler Sts. 39°25′18″N 81°26′58″W	Marietta	
7	Coal Run Historic District	Coal Run Historic District	February 22, 1996 (#96000115)	Roughly along Main, Maple, and Hill Sts. in Coal Run; 39°34′01″N 81°35′15″W	Waterford Township	
8	Walter Curtis House	Walter Curtis House	October 3, 1980 (#80003244)	South of Little Hocking; 39°13′17″N 81°42′39″W	Belpre Township	
9	Col. Simeon Deming House	Col. Simeon Deming House	March 24, 1980 (#80003245)	Northeast of Watertown on Willis Rd. 39°29′21″N 81°36′35″W	Watertown Township	
10	Erwin Hall, Marietta College	Erwin Hall, Marietta College	April 23, 1973 (#73001547)	5th St. on Marietta College campus 39°25′01″N 81°27′02″W	Marietta	
11	First Unitarian Church Of Marietta	First Unitarian Church Of Marietta	October 3, 1973 (#73001548)	232 3rd St. 39°24′58″N 81°27′11″W	Marietta	
12	Harmar Historic District	Harmar Historic District	December 19, 1974 (#74001645)	Roughly bounded by the Ohio and Muskingum Rivers and the rear property line of Lancaster, George, and Franklin Sts.; also roughly bounded by Lancaster, Harmar, Putnam, and Franklin Sts. and the Ohio River, Fort Harmar Dr., and the Muskingum River; 39°24′35″N 81°27′46″W	Marietta	Second set of boundaries represents a boundary increase of 1993
13	Harra Covered Bridge	Harra Covered Bridge	October 8, 1976 (#76001547)	2 mi (3.2 km) northwest of Watertown on State Route 172; 39°29′16″N 81°38′53″W	Watertown Township	
14	Hildreth Covered Bridge	Hildreth Covered Bridge	February 8, 1978 (#78002211)	5 mi (8.0 km) east of Marietta off State Route 26; 39°25′38″N 81°21′42″W	Newport Township	
15	Hune Covered Bridge	Hune Covered Bridge	October 8, 1976 (#76001545)	2.5 mi (4.0 km) north of Dart on State Route 26; 39°30′38″N 81°15′02″W	Lawrence Township	
16	William Hune Farm	William Hune Farm	March 28, 1991 (#91000303)	State Route 26 north of Dart; 39°30′43″N 81°14′56″W	Lawrence Township	
17	John Kaiser House	John Kaiser House	December 10, 1993 (#93001392)	300 Bellevue St. 39°24′56″N 81°27′59″W	Marietta	
18	Marietta Historic District	Marietta Historic District	December 19, 1974 (#74001646)	Roughly bounded by the Muskingum and Ohio Rivers and Warren, 3rd, 5th, and 6th Sts.; also roughly bounded by Marion, Montgomery, Ohio, Greene, Butler, 2nd through 9th Sts., and the Ohio and Muskingum Rivers; 39°25′04″N 81°27′19″W	Marietta	Second set of boundaries represents a boundary increase of 2001
19	Mason House	Mason House	November 29, 1979 (#79001978)	Township Road 393; 39°33′51″N 81°35′05″W	Waterford Township	
20	Mound Cemetery Mound	Mound Cemetery Mound	February 23, 1973 (#73001549)	5th and Scammel Sts. 39°25′13″N 81°27′06″W	Marietta	Mound Cemetery, home to the Mound Cemetery Mound (aka Conus or Great Mound) and reportedly home to the largest number of American Revolutionary War officers buried in one location
21	Muskingum River Navigation Historic District	Muskingum River Navigation Historic District	February 9, 2007 (#07000025)	Coshocton, Muskingum, Morgan, Washington Counties; 39°28′14″N 81°29′28″W	Numerous jurisdictions	
22	Ohio Company Land Office	Ohio Company Land Office	November 10, 1970 (#70000523)	Washington and 2nd Sts., Campus Martius Museum; 39°25′16″N 81°27′42″W	Marietta	
23	Old St. Mary's School	Old St. Mary's School	October 3, 1989 (#89001457)	132 S. 4th St. 39°24′52″N 81°26′49″W	Marietta	Destroyed
24	Rufus Putnam House	Rufus Putnam House	November 10, 1970 (#70000524)	Campus Martius Museum, corner of 2nd and Washington Sts. 39°25′17″N 81°27′41″W	Marietta	
25	Rinard Covered Bridge	Rinard Covered Bridge	October 8, 1976 (#76001546)	Northeast of Wingett Run on County Road 406; 39°32′12″N 81°13′23″W	Ludlow Township	
26	Root Covered Bridge	Root Covered Bridge	March 27, 1975 (#75001552)	0.5 mi (0.80 km) north of Decaturville on County Route 6; 39°20′33″N 81°45′16″W	Decatur Township	
27	Sawyer-Curtis House	Sawyer-Curtis House	October 18, 1984 (#84002696)	Off U.S. Route 50 in Little Hocking; 39°15′39″N 81°41′47″W	Belpre Township	
28	Shinn Covered Bridge	Shinn Covered Bridge	October 8, 1976 (#76001544)	Northeast of Bartlett off State Route 555; 39°27′46″N 81°45′40″W	Palmer Township	
29	Sixth Street Railroad Bridge	Sixth Street Railroad Bridge	December 10, 1982 (#82001785)	East of the 5th Street Bridge; 39°16′15″N 81°33′54″W	Belpre	Extends into Wood County, West Virginia
30	Spencer's Landing	Spencer's Landing	August 18, 1992 (#92001035)	4 E. 5th St. 39°16′37″N 81°33′59″W	Belpre	
31	Jonathan Sprague House	Jonathan Sprague House	January 11, 1983 (#83002067)	West of Lowell off State Route 60; 39°33′34″N 81°34′13″W	Adams Township	
32	Capt. Jonathan Stone House	Capt. Jonathan Stone House	February 7, 1978 (#78002209)	612 Blennerhassett Ave. 39°16′15″N 81°34′37″W	Belpre	Oldest building in Belpre. Associated with the Underground Railway.
33	Vaughn-Stacy-Evans Farm Historic District	Vaughn-Stacy-Evans Farm Historic District	September 6, 2006 (#06000764)	7700 State Route 60, southeast of Lowell; 39°30′22″N 81°27′39″W	Muskingum Township	
34	W. P. Snyder Jr. (towboat)	W. P. Snyder Jr. (towboat)	November 10, 1970 (#70000522)	On the Muskingum River at Sacra Via; 39°25′13″N 81°27′48″W	Marietta	
35	Waernicke-Hille House and Store	Waernicke-Hille House and Store	November 29, 1979 (#79001977)	Township Road 36 in Archers Fork; 39°29′03″N 81°12′19″W	Independence Township	
36	Watertown Historic District	Watertown Historic District	April 10, 1986 (#86000728)	East of State Route 339 and north of State Route 676; 39°27′59″N 81°37′57″W	Watertown Township	
37	Wilcox-Mills House	Wilcox-Mills House	April 13, 1973 (#73001550)	301 5th St. 39°25′04″N 81°27′05″W	Marietta	

== See also ==
- List of National Historic Landmarks in Ohio
- Listings in neighboring counties: Athens, Monroe, Morgan, Noble, Pleasants (WV), Tyler (WV), Wood (WV)
- National Register of Historic Places listings in Ohio
