= Bell Covered Bridge =

- U.S. National Register of Historic Places
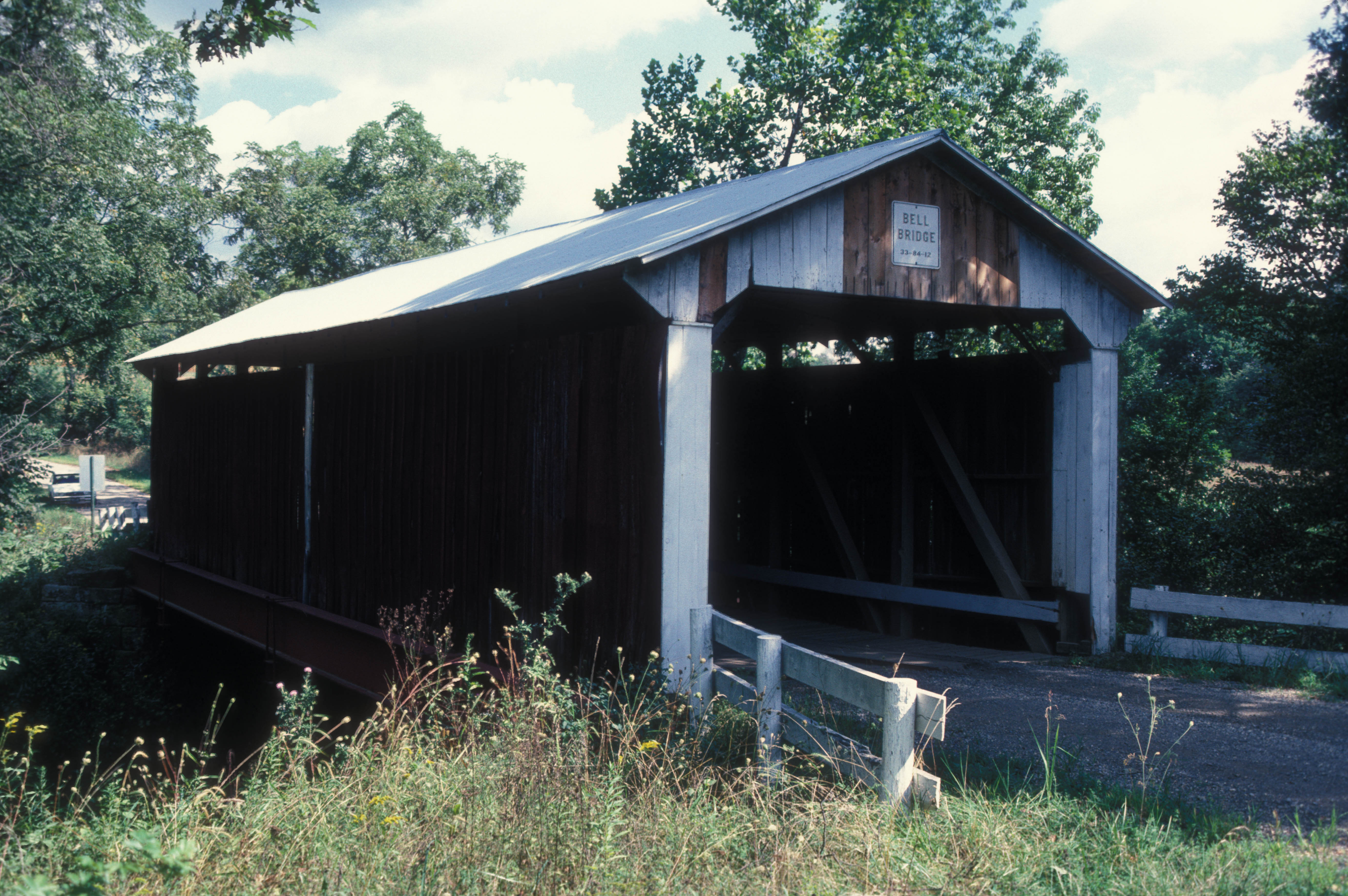
- Southern portal and western side

- Location within Ohio Location within the United States
- Location: Northwest of Barlow in Barlow Township
- Nearest city: Barlow, Ohio
- Coordinates: 39.431174°N 81.676210°W
- Area: Less than 1 acre (0.40 ha)
- Built: 1888
- Architect: Ebenezer B. Henderson
- Architectural style: Multiple Kingpost Truss
- NRHP reference No.: 12000836
- Added to NRHP: October 3, 2012

The Bell Covered Bridge is a historic wooden covered bridge in rural Washington County, Ohio, United States. One of several such bridges in the region built by the same man, it remained open to traffic with the exception of periodic repairs, until it was permanently closed on September 12, 2022, and it has been named a historic site.

Located near the community of Barlow in Barlow Township, the bridge carries the gravel Bell Road over Falls Creek, a southwestern tributary of Wolf Creek. Surrounded by woods, the bridge lies adjacent to the farm once owned by the namesake Bell family, and the surrounding countryside is a mixture of forests and agricultural fields. The builder was E.B. Henderson, who was responsible for four bridges in the area: the Blackwood Covered Bridge (1879), the Shinn Covered Bridge (1886), the Bell Covered Bridge (1888), and the Henry Covered Bridge (1894). Like two of the other three, the Bell is a multiple king post truss design, which became popular nationwide following its use on the National Road in a past version of the Y-bridge in Zanesville to the north. An ordinary gable-roofed bridge with windows just below the roofline, the bridge spans 59 feet (18 m); the deck is approximately 18 feet (5.5 m) wide, with 15 feet (4.6 m) of interior width, and the 11 feet (3.4 m) height permits slightly more than 9 feet (2.7 m) of interior clearance. It rests on abutments built of sandstone, quarried locally, while the roof is made of tin. The abutments are similar, with their faces underlying the bridge decks and wing walls to the side.

Officials twice closed the bridge for extensive repairs: structural problems prompted a 1998 closure, during which stones in the abutment were replaced, the truss system solidified, and missing or damaged components replaced with identical newly produced components, and a 2005 closure to fix damage caused by termites. With those exceptions, the bridge remained open continuously since its construction through September 12, 2022. On September 12, 2022, the bridge was permanently closed and a bypass was built by contractors under the direction of Washington County officials. The bypass opened on November 14, 2022.

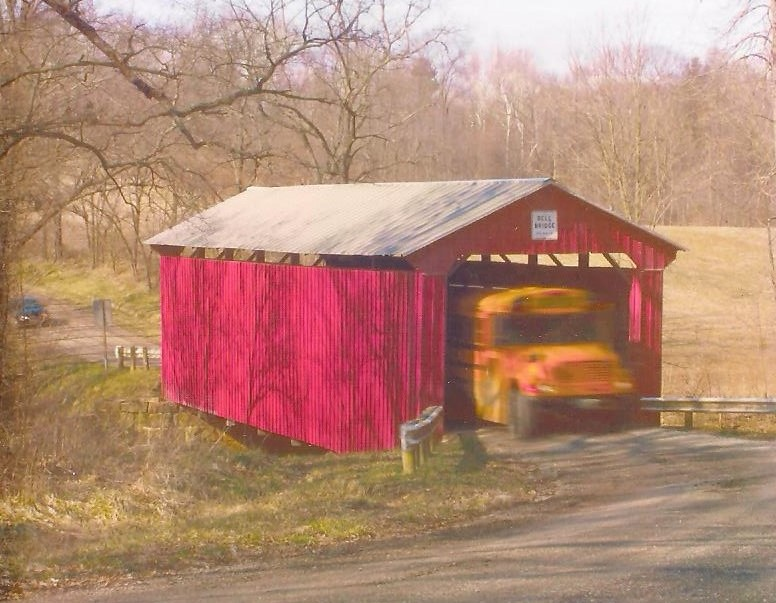

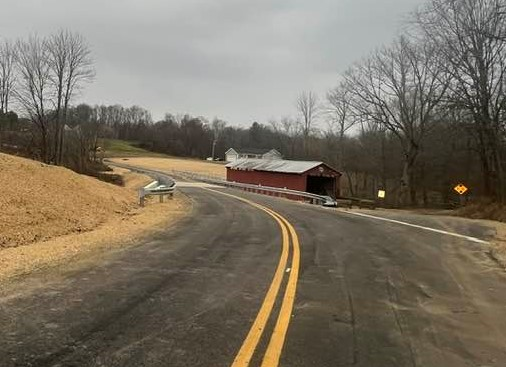
Bell Covered Bridge Bypass

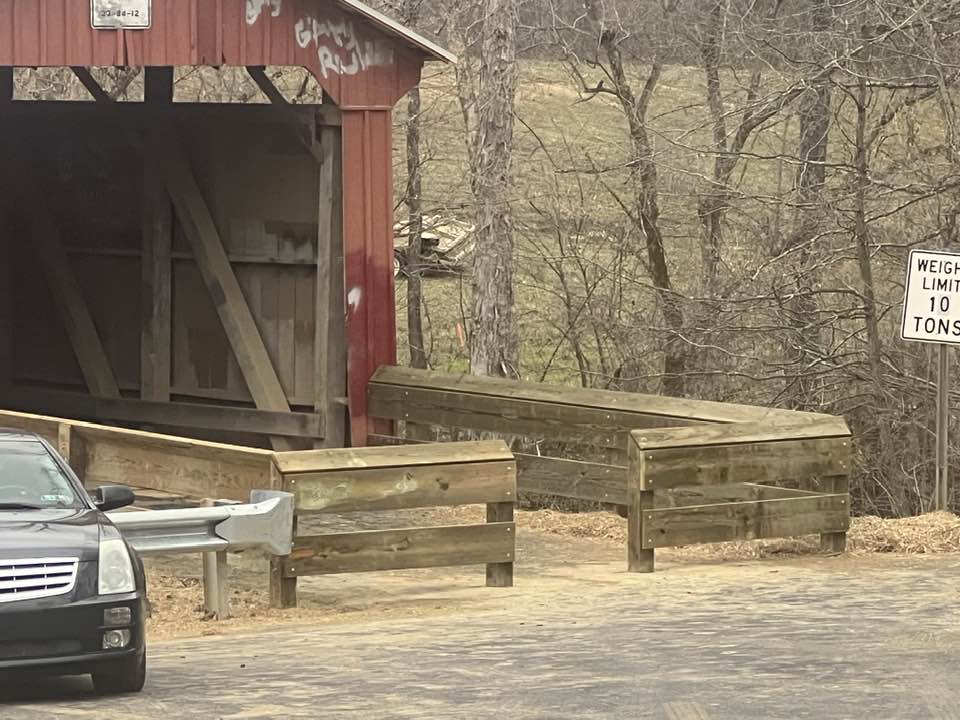
Bell Covered Bridge in November 2022 with railings for foot traffic only

In late 2012, the Bell Covered Bridge was listed on the National Register of Historic Places, qualifying as a historically significant example of local engineering. It is one of seven covered bridges on the National Register in Washington County, along with Henderson's Shinn Bridge and the Harra, Hildreth, Hune, Rinard, and Root Bridges.
