= Aurelius Township =

Aurelius Township may refer to the following places in the United States:

- Aurelius Township, Michigan
- Aurelius Township, Washington County, Ohio
