= John Burrows (baseball) =

American baseball player (1913–1987)

- Pitcher
- Born: October 30, 1913; Winnfield, Louisiana, U.S.
- Died: April 27, 1987 (aged 73); Coal Run, Ohio, U.S.
- Batted: Right Threw: Left

MLB debut
- April 25, 1943, for the Philadelphia Athletics

Last MLB appearance
- May 17, 1944, for the Chicago Cubs

MLB statistics
- Win–loss record: 0–3
- Earned run average: 5.61
- Strikeouts: 22
- Stats at Baseball Reference

Teams
- Philadelphia Athletics (1943); Chicago Cubs (1943–1944)

John Burrows (October 30, 1913 – April 27, 1987) was an American professional baseball pitcher. He played in Major League Baseball (MLB) from 1943 to 1944 for the Philadelphia Athletics and Chicago Cubs.

Burrows died in an accidental house fire at his home on Weppler Road near Coal Run, Ohio. His ashes are interred in Round Bottom Cemetery, on Ohio 60 between Beverly and Coal Run.
