= Henry Covered Bridge =

Henry Covered Bridge may refer to:

- Henry Covered Bridge (Ohio)
- Henry Covered Bridge (Pennsylvania)
- Henry Covered Bridge (Vermont)
