= Bartlett, Ohio =

Unincorporated community in Ohio, U.S.

Coordinates: 39°25′10″N 81°48′56″W

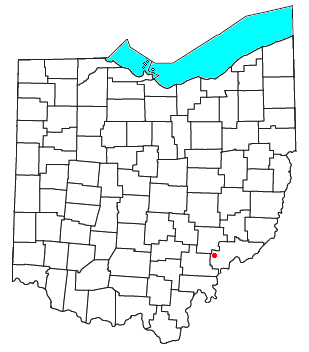
Location of Bartlett, Ohio

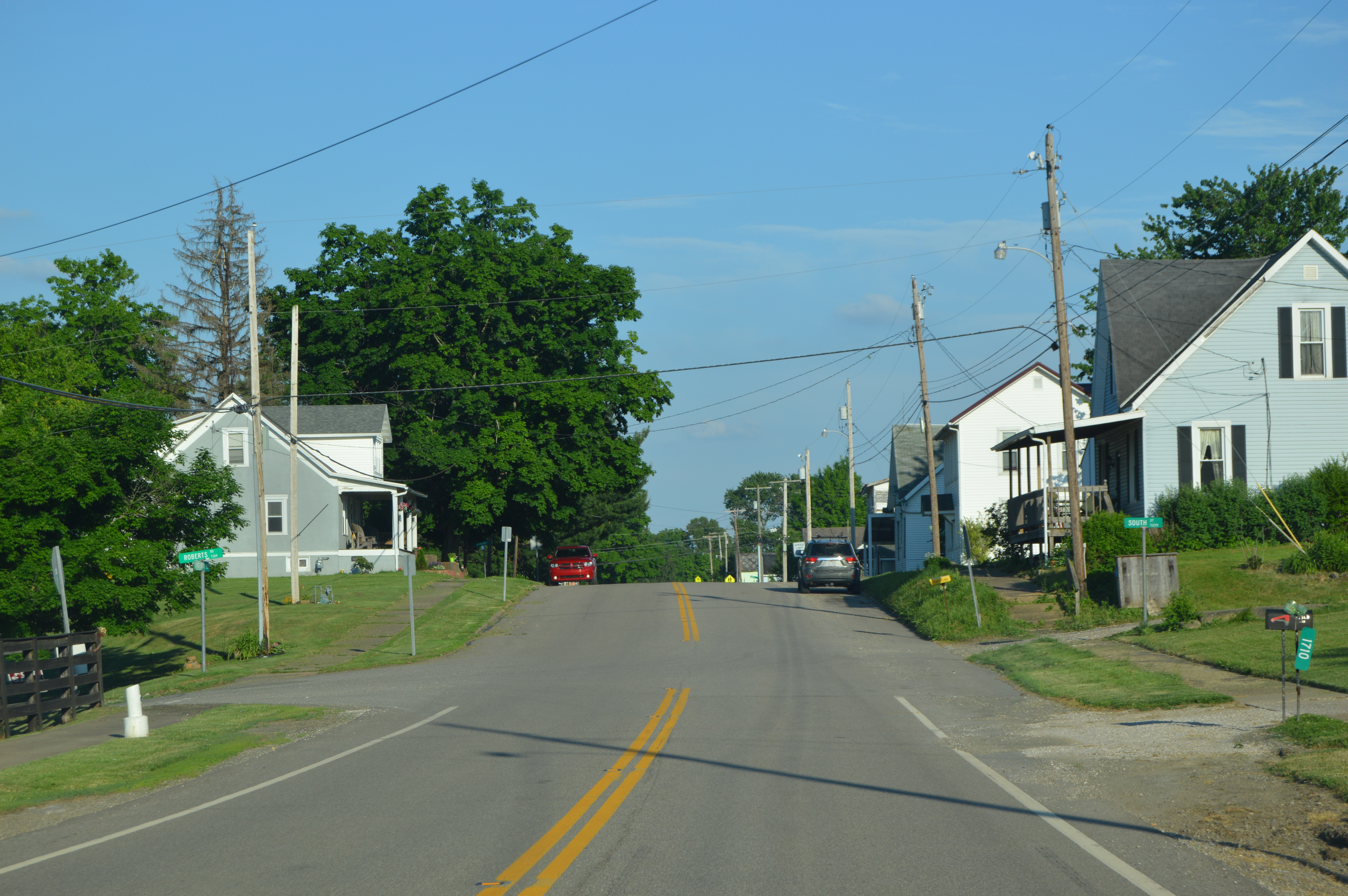
Houses along State Route 550

Bartlett is an unincorporated community in southwestern Wesley Township, Washington County, Ohio, United States. It has a post office with the ZIP code 45713. It sits at the intersection of State Routes 550 and 555 near Coal Run, a subsidiary of Wolf Creek, which meets the Muskingum River at Waterford to the north. Near Bartlett is located the Shinn Covered Bridge, which spans Wolf Creek.

== History ==
Bartlett was laid out in 1832. A post office called Bartlett has been in operation since 1834. Amos Bartlett, the first postmaster, gave the community his name.
