= Jonathan Sprague House =

Historic house in Ohio, United States

- U.S. National Register of Historic Places
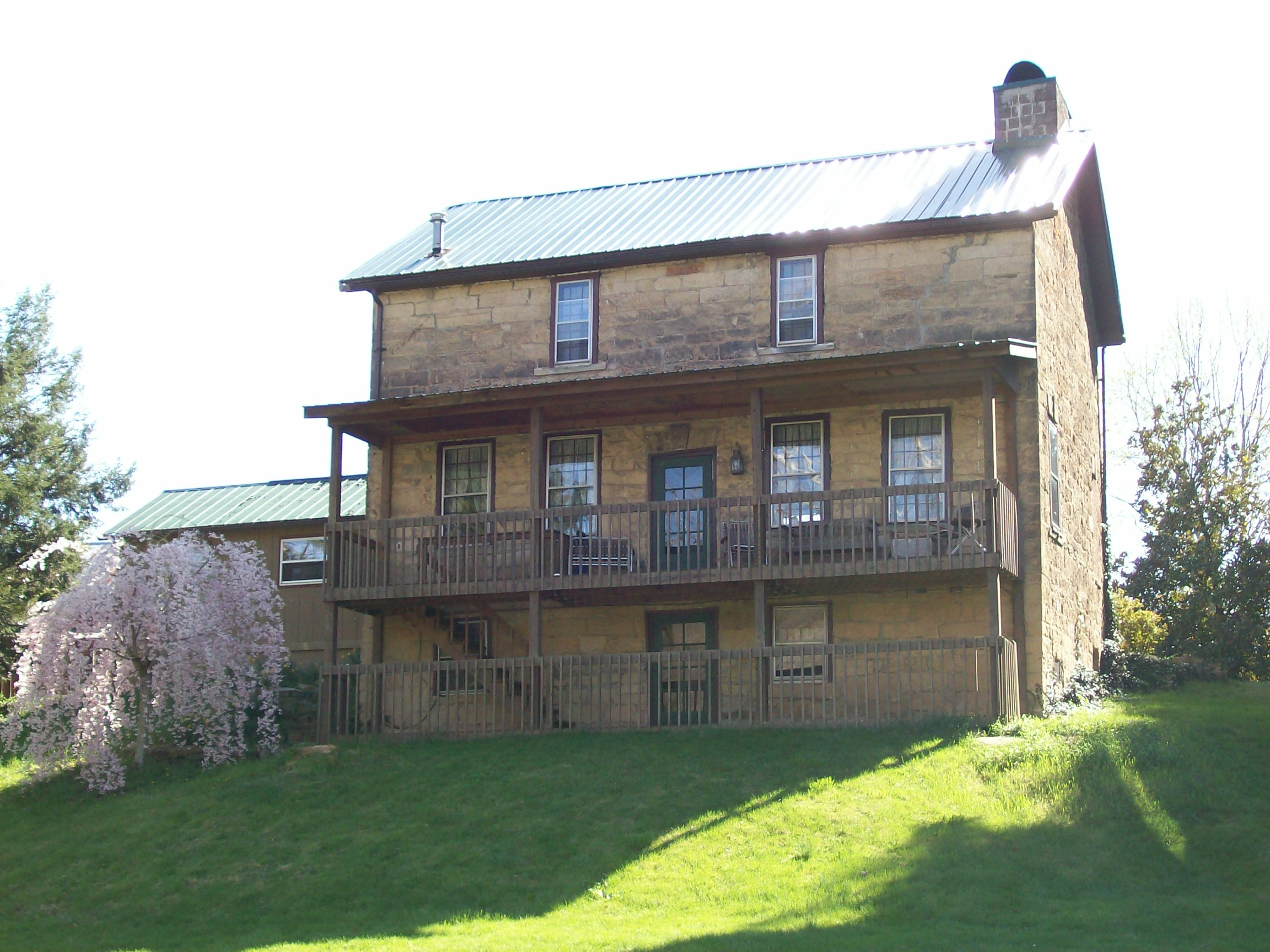
- Front of the house

- Location within Ohio Location within the United States
- Nearest city: Lowell, Ohio
- Coordinates: 39°33′34″N 81°34′13″W
- Area: 3 acres (1.2 ha)
- Built: 1800
- Architect: Jonathan Sprague
- Architectural style: Federal
- NRHP reference No.: 83002067
- Added to NRHP: January 11, 1983

The Jonathan Sprague House is a historic residence in northwestern Washington County, Ohio, United States. Located atop a bluff above the Muskingum River, it is one of Washington County's most significant houses, due to its age and method of construction.

Joshua Sprague and his brothers William and Jonathan migrated to Marietta in 1788, less than a year after it was founded as the first white settlement in the Northwest Territory; there, they soon signed a contract to contribute to the construction of Campus Martius. After living in Marietta for a time, the three men moved to the vicinity of present-day Waterford; Joshua and William later left the area, but Jonathan remained where he had settled. Here, he farmed, pursued the trade of carpentry, and operated a gristmill.

At the age of thirty-three, Jonathan constructed the present house. Built in the Federal style of architecture, it is three-and-a-half stories tall and built primarily of large blocks of sandstone. When it was completed in 1800, it was the first stone house to be built anywhere in Washington County. Sprague's barn, completed in 1803, is also historically significant as one of the oldest extant barns in the county.

In 1983, the Jonathan Sprague House was listed on the National Register of Historic Places, along with the barn. Key to this designation was the property's nature as a rare survivor of Ohio's earliest architecture: architectural historians have seen the house as a fine example of the Federal architecture, and the barn — while architecturally undistinctive — is nevertheless an important survivor of the earliest years of Washington County's history. Located west of Lowell across the Muskingum from State Route 60, it is close to two other historic sites: the Mason House and the Coal Run Historic District, both located in the community of Coal Run, lie approximately 0.75 miles (1.21 km) to the northwest.
