= Palmer Township, Ohio =

Palmer Township, Ohio may refer to:

- Palmer Township, Putnam County, Ohio
- Palmer Township, Washington County, Ohio
