= Julia Louisa Dumont =

American educator and writer

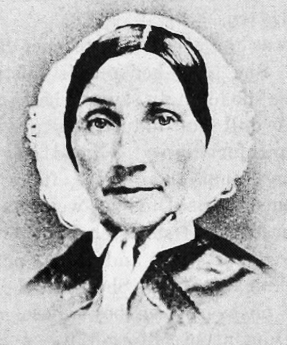
- Born: Julia Louisa Cory; October 1794 Waterford, Ohio, US
- Died: January 2, 1857 (aged 62) Vevay, Indiana, US
- Occupation: Educator, writer
- Period: Romantic era
- Children: 6, including Ebenezer Dumont

Julia Louisa Dumont (October 1794 – January 2, 1857) was an American educator and writer of prose of the Romantic era. Born in Ohio, she resided for 43 years at Vevay, Indiana. She was one of the chief figures in the group of writers and poets who flourished in the Ohio Valley in its early history, and is remembered as the first Hoosier to become known beyond the State through prose. Her Life Sketches from Common Paths: A Series of American Tales, published at New York City in 1856, is considered exemplary of the day.

== Early years and education ==
Julia L. Cory (or Corey), the earliest female writer in the West whose poems, tales and sketches were preserved, was the daughter of Ebenezer and Martha D. Corey. Her parents emigrated from Rhode Island to Marietta, Ohio, with the Ohio Company, which settled at that place. She was born at Waterford, Ohio, in October 1794. Her parents returned to Rhode Island during her infancy, and while she was yet a baby, her father died. Her mother removed to Greenfield, New York, and married the second time. They then had their residence on the Kayaderosseras Range, in Greenfield. She spent some time in the Milton Academy, in Saratoga county, where she excelled. In 1811, she taught a school in Greenfield, and in 1812 in Cambridge, New York.

== Career ==
In August 1812, she was married John Dumont, who was a member of the Indiana Legislature in 1822–1823, and was afterward a candidate for the office of Governor, against David Wallace, and the following October they removed to Ohio. They moved to Vevay, Indiana in March 1814, and made it her home till death. Her husband being a lawyer, was, according to the custom of those times, away from home a lot, attending the courts of other counties. The care of the family fell upon her. As schools were scarce and poor, she instructed her own children herself. She opened a school, and thereafter, much of her life was spent in the school-room as a western pioneer teacher.

Dumont was also a writer. She was a frequent contributor to the Literary Gazette, published at Cincinnati. Several of the best poems she wrote were first printed in the Gazette, among which are "Poverty," "The Pauper to the Rich Man," and "The Orphan Emigrant." In the years 1834, 1835 and 1836, she wrote frequently for the Cincinnati Mirror, but chiefly in prose. She was awarded two prizes by the publishers of the Mirror for stories on Western themes. One of those stories, "Ashton Grey," with others, contributed to the Western Literary Journal, and The Ladies' Repository, are collected in a volume entitled Life Sketches.

== Personal life ==
A son, Ebenezer Dumont, was a general in the Union Army during the American Civil War. Three sons died young, followed by a daughter. Another son, who grew to manhood and was admitted to the bar, died early. After Dumont's health gave way, she went to the South to regain her former strength and activity, but died in Vevay from consumption on January 2, 1857. A granddaughter, E. S. L. Thompson, was a writer of poetry and prose.

== Selected works ==
- Life Sketches from Common Paths: A Series of American Tales
