= Jackson Township, Noble County, Ohio =

Township in Ohio, US

- Township
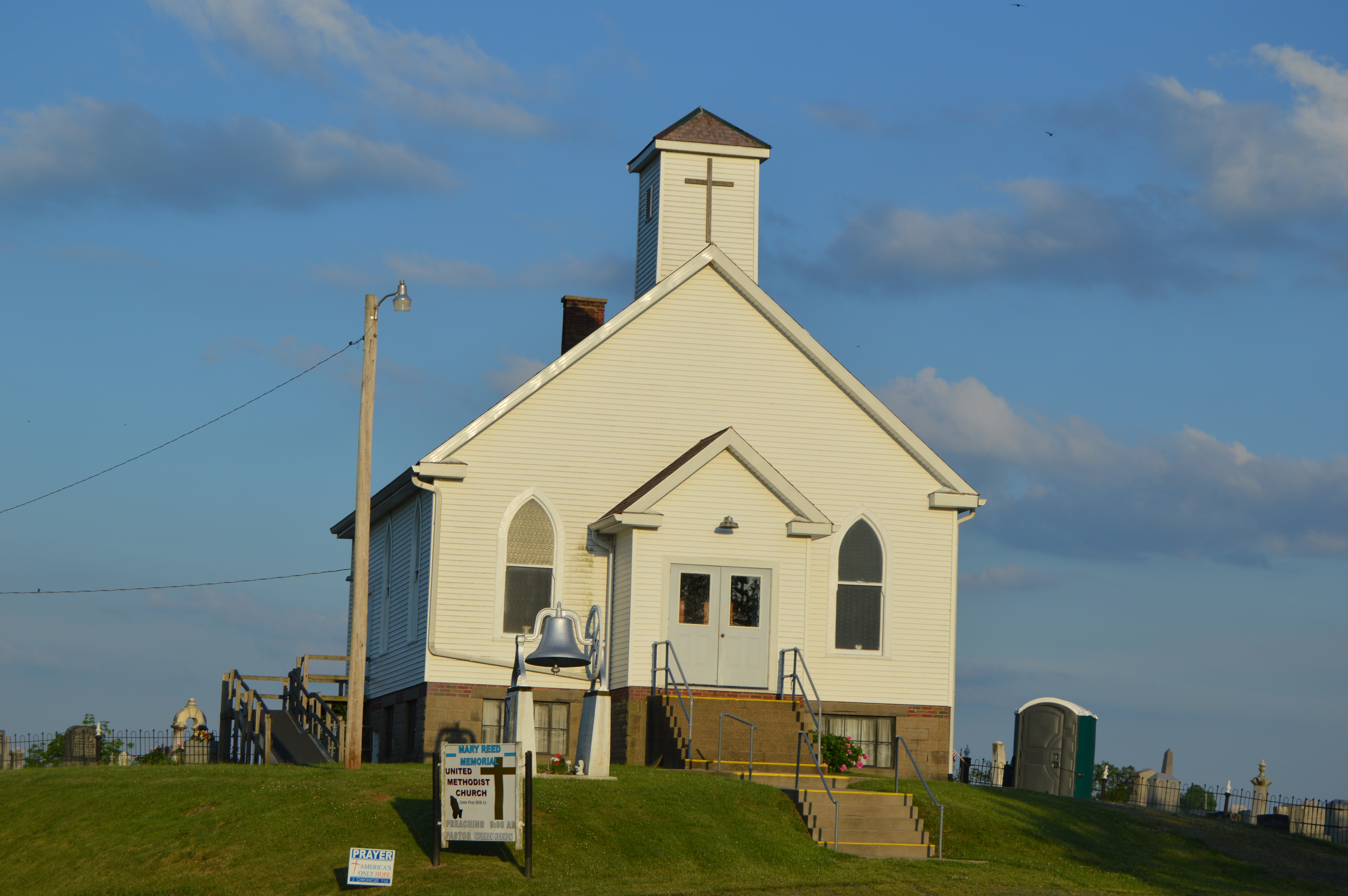
- Methodist church at Crooked Tree

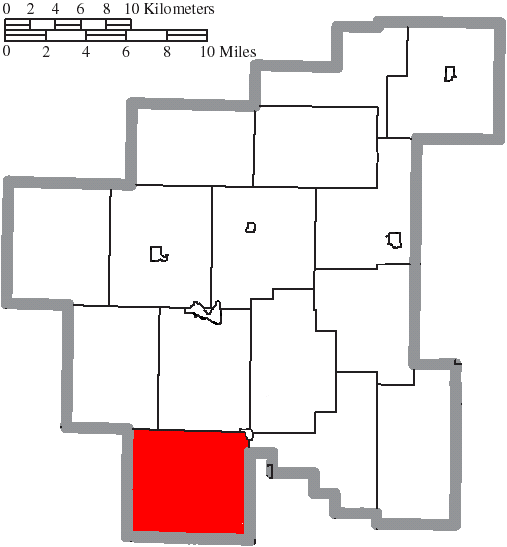
- Location of Jackson Township in Noble County
- Coordinates: 39°37′30″N 81°32′16″W
- Country: United States
- State: Ohio
- County: Noble

Area
  - Total: 32.4 sq mi (83.9 km^{2})
  - Land: 32.4 sq mi (83.9 km^{2})
  - Water: 0 sq mi (0.0 km^{2})
- Elevation: 1,020 ft (310 m)

Population (2020)
  - Total: 485
  - Density: 15.0/sq mi (5.78/km^{2})
- Time zone: UTC-5 (Eastern (EST))
  - Summer (DST): UTC-4 (EDT)
- FIPS code: 39-37940
- GNIS feature ID: 1086745

Jackson Township is one of the fifteen townships of Noble County, Ohio, United States. The 2020 census found 485 people in the township.

== Geography ==
Located in the southwestern corner of the county, it borders the following townships:

- Olive Township - north
- Enoch Township - northeast corner
- Jefferson Township - northeast, south of Enoch Township
- Aurelius Township, Washington County - east
- Salem Township, Washington County - southeast corner
- Adams Township, Washington County - south
- Waterford Township, Washington County - southwest corner
- Center Township - west
- Sharon Township - northwest

It is the most southerly township in Noble County.

A part of the small village of Dexter City is located in far northeastern Jackson Township.

== Name and history ==
Jackson Township was originally called Olive Green Township, and under the latter name was organized in 1819 in territory then belonging to Morgan County.

It is one of thirty-seven Jackson Townships statewide.

== Government ==
The township is governed by a three-member board of trustees, who are elected in November of odd-numbered years to a four-year term beginning on the following January 1. Two are elected in the year after the presidential election and one is elected in the year before it. There is also an elected township fiscal officer, who serves a four-year term beginning on April 1 of the year after the election, which is held in November of the year before the presidential election. Vacancies in the fiscal officership or on the board of trustees are filled by the remaining trustees.
