= Crooked Tree, Ohio =

- Unincorporated community
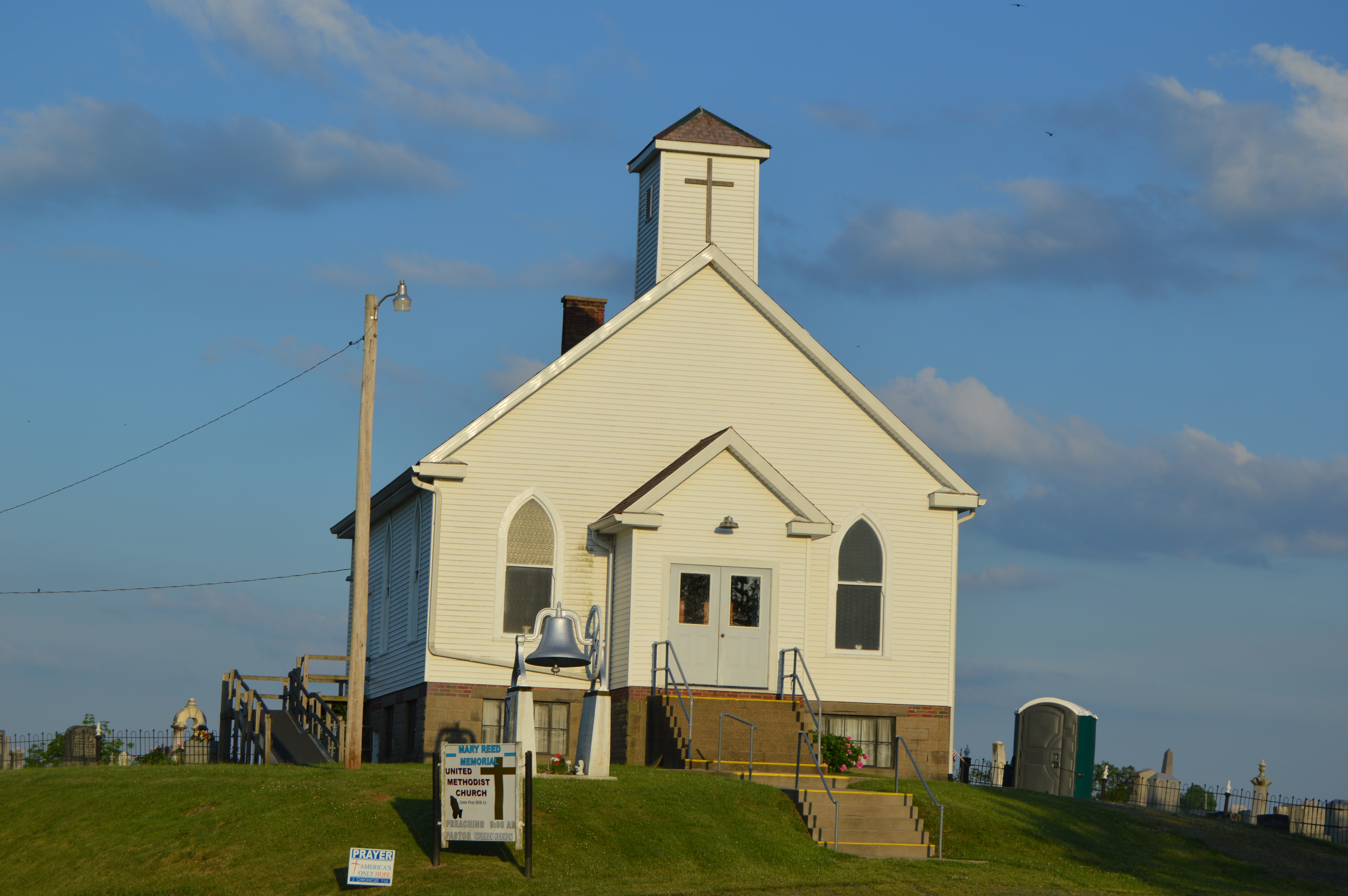
- Mary Reed Memorial Methodist Church

- Location within Ohio Location within the United States
- Coordinates: 39°38′17″N 81°30′00″W
- Country: United States
- State: Ohio
- County: Noble
- Elevation: 1,066 ft (325 m)
- Time zone: UTC-5 (Eastern (EST))
  - Summer (DST): UTC-4 (EDT)
- Area code: 740
- GNIS feature ID: 1061009

Crooked Tree is an unincorporated community in Jackson Township, Noble County, Ohio, United States. Crooked Tree is located on Ohio State Route 339, 2 miles (3.2 km) southwest of Dexter City.

== History ==
Crooked Tree was originally called Jacksonville, and under the latter name was laid out in 1854. The present name was given on account of there being a crooked tree near the original town site. A post office was established under the name Crooked Tree in 1858, and remained in operation until 1904.
