= Root Covered Bridge =

- U.S. National Register of Historic Places
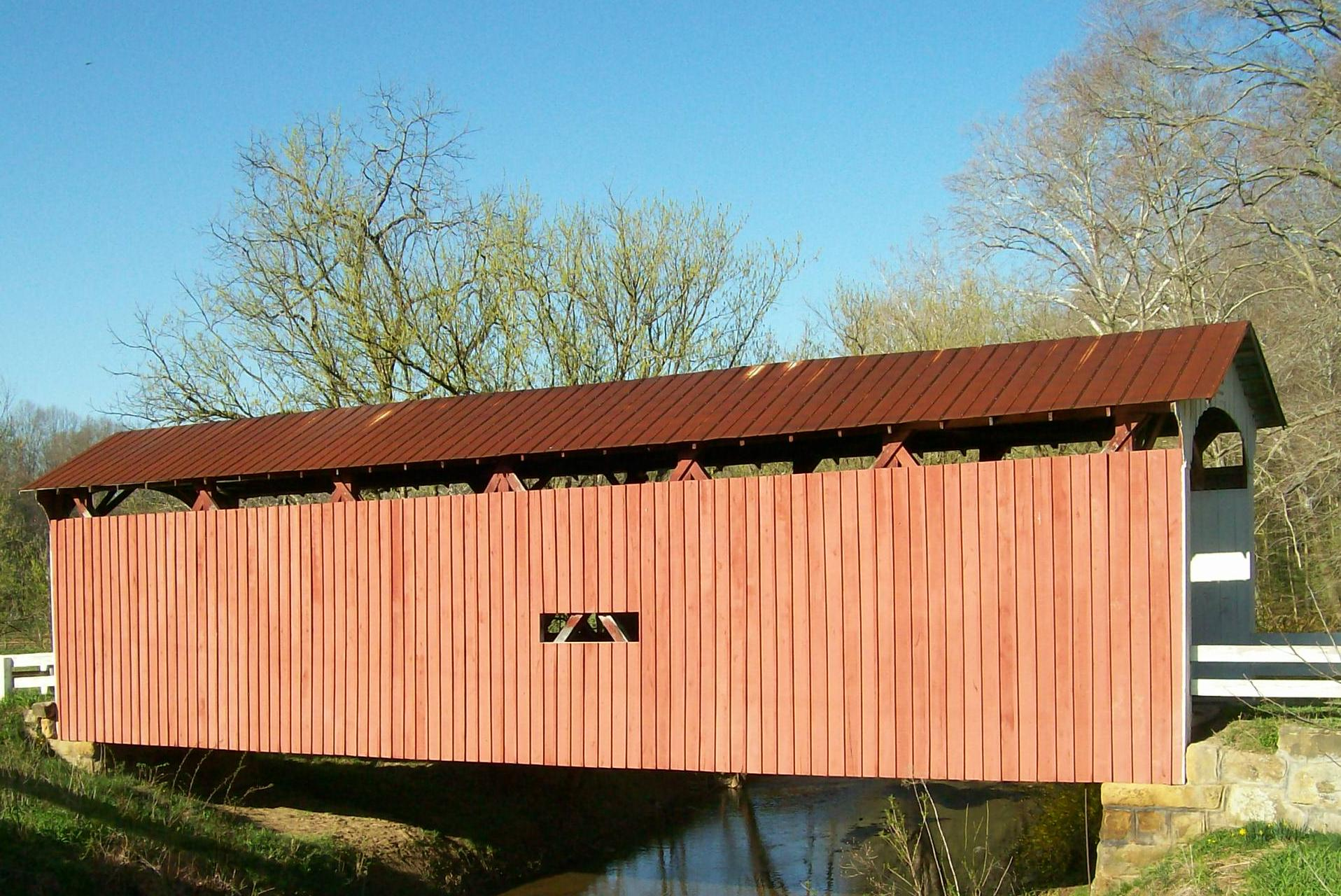
- Western (downstream) side of the bridge

- Location within Ohio Location within the United States
- Nearest city: Decaturville, Ohio
- Coordinates: 39°20′33″N 81°45′16″W
- Area: Less than 1 acre (0.40 ha)
- Built: 1878
- Architect: Rolla Merydith
- Architectural style: Long truss
- NRHP reference No.: 75001552
- Added to NRHP: March 27, 1975

The Root Covered Bridge is a historic wooden covered bridge in the southeastern part of the U.S. state of Ohio. Located off State Route 555 in far northern Decatur Township, Washington County, the bridge was built in 1878 in the Long truss mode of truss bridge construction. Measuring 65 feet (20 m) in its single span, it spans the West Branch of the Little Hocking River.

Constructed with weatherboarded walls on stone abutments and equipped with a metal roof and elements of iron and steel, the Root Bridge was named for the nearby community of Root Town, which has since become a ghost town. Its builders were Charles and Alta Merydith, who built many other Washington County bridges; two other bridges in the county, known as the Hune and the Harra Covered Bridges, also employ the Long truss. It is believed that the Merydith family heavily favored the style, because they were responsible for building both of those bridges. Throughout Ohio, only eight Long truss bridges are in existence today; the majority of Ohio's Long truss bridges are located in southern Ohio. Besides the importance of the Merydith family, this concentration is also likely due to the presence of one of the designer's agents in the region, who also functioned as a general contractor for bridge construction in southern Ohio.

In early 1975, the Root Covered Bridge was listed on the National Register of Historic Places, qualifying because of its importance as a well-preserved example of historic engineering methods. It was the first Washington County covered bridge to be listed on the Register, although five others — including the Harra and Hune bridges — have since received the same designation.
