= Simeon Deming House =

Historic house in Ohio, United States

- Col. Simeon Deming House
- U.S. National Register of Historic Places
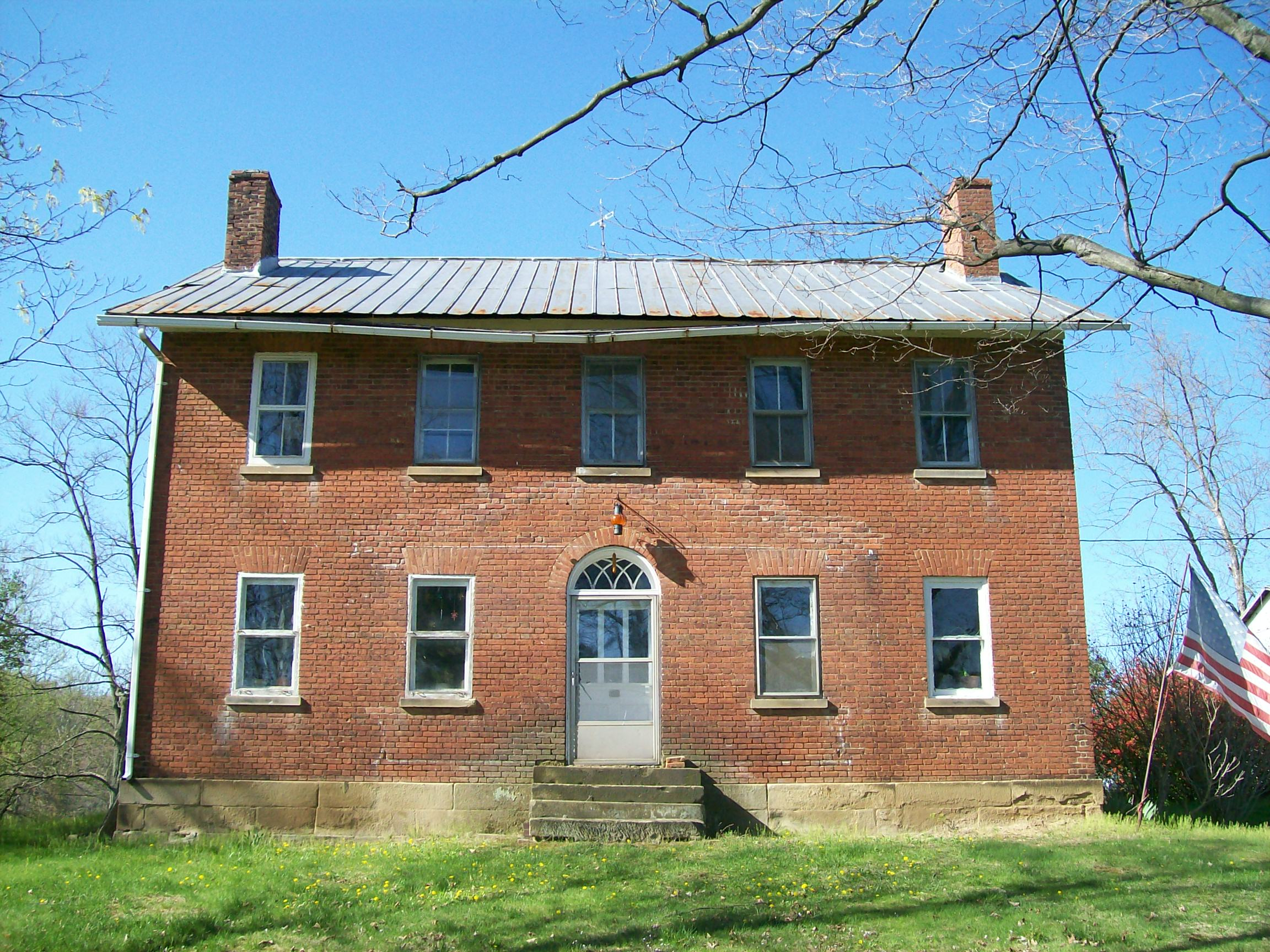
- Front of the house

- Location within Ohio Location within the United States
- Nearest city: Watertown, Ohio
- Coordinates: 39°29′21″N 81°36′35″W
- Area: 4 acres (1.6 ha)
- Built: 1815
- Architectural style: Federal
- NRHP reference No.: 80003245
- Added to NRHP: March 24, 1980

The Simeon Deming House is a historic residence in western Washington County, Ohio, United States. Located along Kern Road northeast of the community of Watertown, the house was built circa 1815 as the residence of a veteran of the American Revolution. A native of Sandisfield, Massachusetts, Deming enlisted in the Continental Army in 1780 and was later promoted to an officer's rank.

The present structure is one of Ohio's oldest extant Federal houses, featuring brick walls that rest on a foundation of sandstone with a full basement. Two-and-a-half stories tall, and topped with a metal roof, the walls are built in Flemish bond. Central to the four-bay symmetrical facade is a rounded-arch main doorway with a transom and the original fanlight. A brick smokehouse is the only remaining original outbuilding remaining on the property.

In 1980, the Simeon Deming House was listed on the National Register of Historic Places. The house qualified for inclusion on the Register for two different reasons: because of its association with Deming and because of its locally significant historic architecture.
