= E. S. L. Thompson =

American dramatist

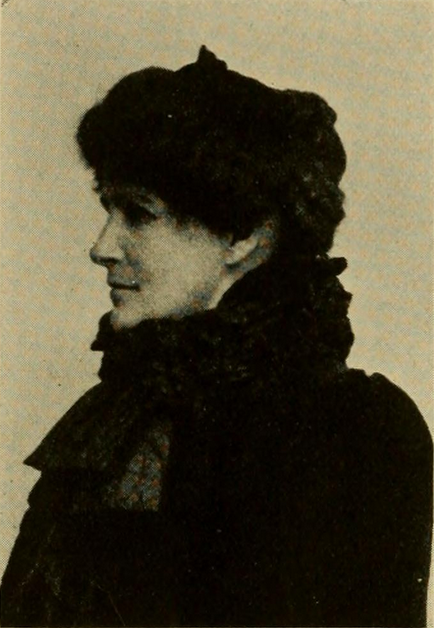
- Born: Elizabeth Shepherd Lamb; August 7, 1848; Vevay, Indiana, U.S.
- Died: April 25, 1944 (aged 95); Muncie, Indiana, U.S.
- Occupations: writer; lecturer
- Spouse: William A. Thompson (m. 1886; died 1925)
- Children: 4
- Relatives: Julia Louisa Dumont (grandmother)
- Writing career
- Genres: poetry, short stories, plays, opera, children's literature

E. S. L. Thompson (née, Elizabeth Shepherd Lamb; August 7, 1848 – April 25, 1944) was an American writer of prose and verse. In addition to poetry, short stories, plays, and an opera, her greatest success was in the area of children's literature, telling stories and writing entertaining poems. Her short story collections include The Raising of the Sons of Wooley (1903) and In the Land of the Banjo and the Fiddle (1937). She was also popular on the lecture platform, speaking upon a variety of subjects with marked success.

== Biography ==
Elizabeth Shepherd Lamb was born in Vevay, Indiana, August 7, 1848. She was the daughter of Judge Richard N. Lamb, of Indianapolis. Her mother was the daughter of Julia Louisa Dumont, one of the early Western writers.

Thompson's literary talents were varied. Her poems possessed lyric quality, and were sought after by song publishers. She was the author of the following songs: "Christmas by the Tennessee,” “Our Glorious Flag,” “Come Pledge Your Troth to Mine,” “The Price I Ask for Roses," "Indiana Wherever We Wander," “Slumber Sea,” “Along the Mohawk's Banks To-Night,” “Tell Me So," and "Love's Golden Days".

Thompson contributed to magazines and newspapers since 1890. Her short stories were excellent examples of that division of literary work; they appeared in St. Nicholas, The Youth's Companion, Lippincott's, Harper's Young People, and other magazines of similar prominence. She was the author of the following volumes of short stories: The Raising of the Sons of Wooley, and In the Land of the Banjo and the Fiddle. As a playwright, the following plays are credited to her: Waiting For Her Cue, A Scion of Royalty, and The Fortune Teller and the Dwarf. She also wrote In Lady Land for the opera.

She married Judge William A. Thompson (1840–1925) in 1886. Thompson and her family resided in Muncie, Indiana, for many years. They had four children: Robert, Marietta, William, and John Maxwell.

She died in Muncie, Indiana, April 25, 1944.

== Selected works ==
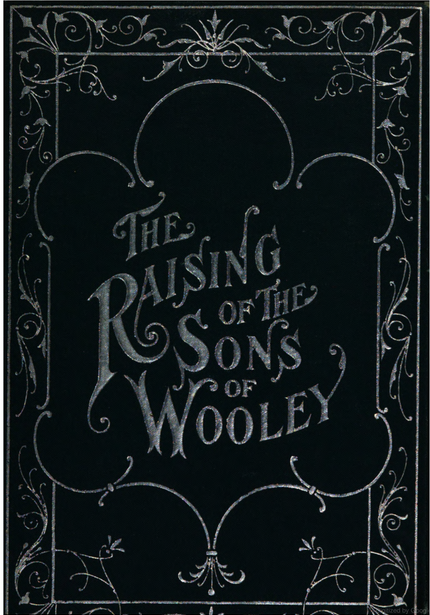
The Raising of the Sons of Wooley, 1903

=== Short story collections ===
- The Raising of the Sons of Wooley, 1903
- In the Land of the Banjo and the Fiddle, 1937

=== Plays ===
- A Scion of Royalty, 1911
- Waiting For Her Cue, 1918

=== Opera ===
- In Lady Land

=== Songs ===
- "Christmas by the Tennessee"
- "Our Glorious Flag"
- "Come Pledge Your Troth to Mine"
- "The Price I Ask for Roses"
- "Indiana Wherever We Wander"
- "Slumber Sea"
- "Along the Mohawk's Banks To-Night"
- "Tell Me So"
- "Love's Golden Days"
