= Adams Township, Washington County, Ohio =

Township in Ohio, US

- Township
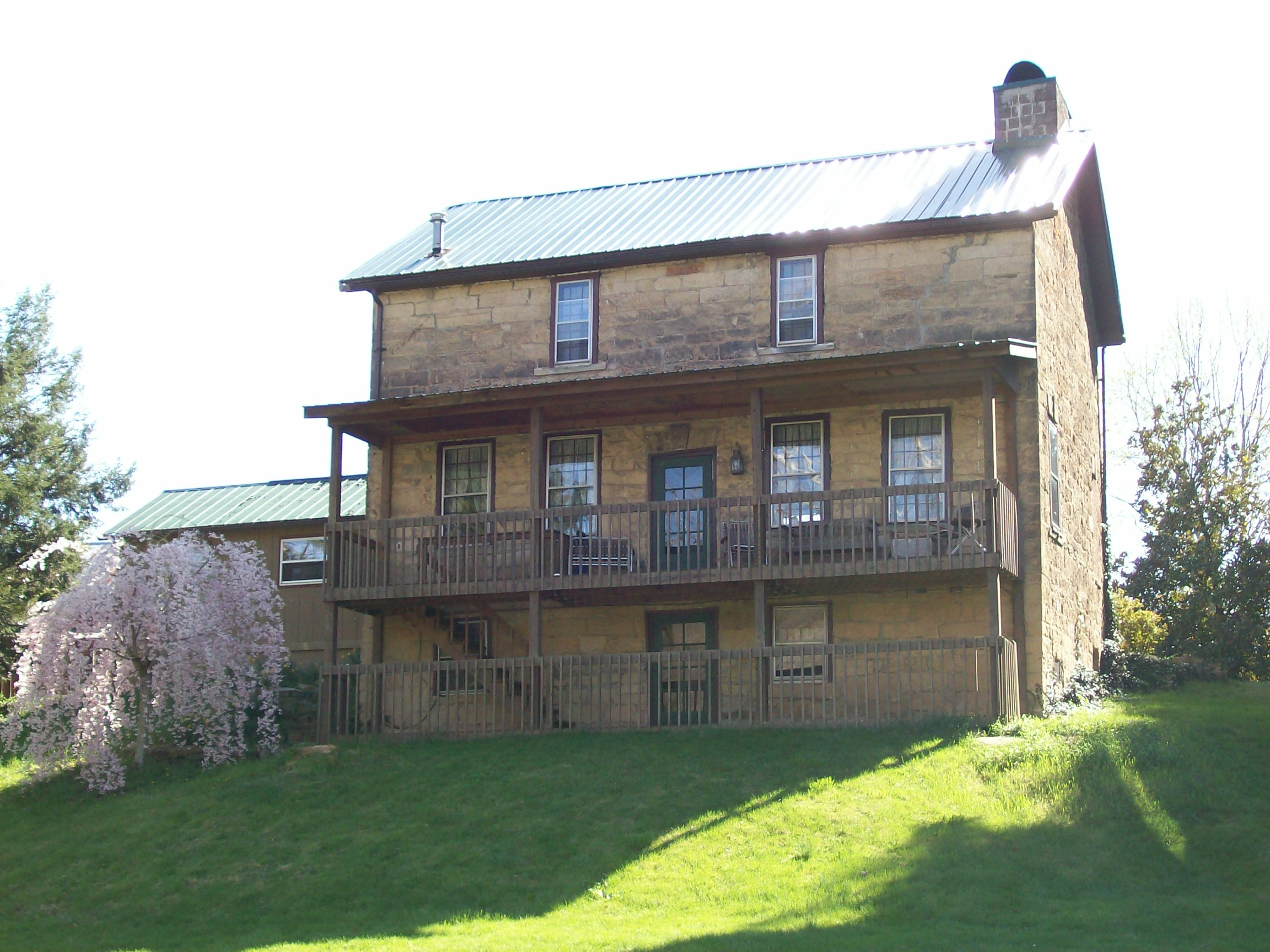
- The Jonathan Sprague House, built 1800

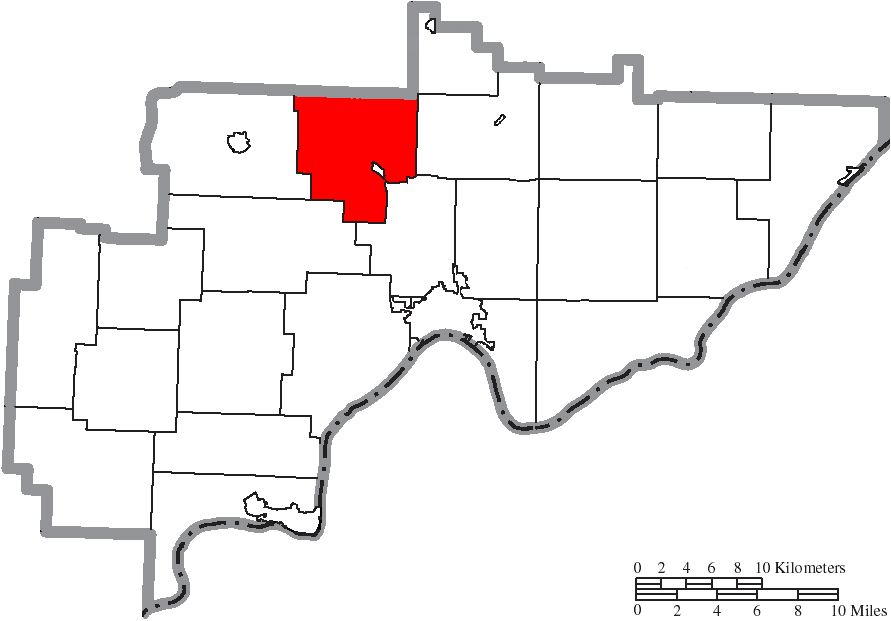
- Location of Adams Township in Washington County
- Coordinates: 39°32′20″N 81°31′26″W
- Country: United States
- State: Ohio
- County: Washington

Area
  - Total: 31.6 sq mi (81.9 km^{2})
  - Land: 31.2 sq mi (80.7 km^{2})
  - Water: 0.46 sq mi (1.2 km^{2})
- Elevation: 750 ft (230 m)

Population (2020)
  - Total: 1,516
  - Density: 49/sq mi (18.8/km^{2})
- Time zone: UTC-5 (Eastern (EST))
  - Summer (DST): UTC-4 (EDT)
- FIPS code: 39-00338
- GNIS feature ID: 1087124

Adams Township is one of the twenty-two townships of Washington County, Ohio, United States. The 2020 census found 1,516 people in the township.

== Geography ==
Located in the northern part of the county, it borders the following townships:

- Jackson Township, Noble County - north
- Aurelius Township - northeast corner
- Salem Township - east
- Muskingum Township - southeast
- Watertown Township - southwest
- Waterford Township - west

The village of Lowell is located in southeastern Adams Township.

== Name and history ==
It is one of ten Adams Townships statewide.

== Government ==
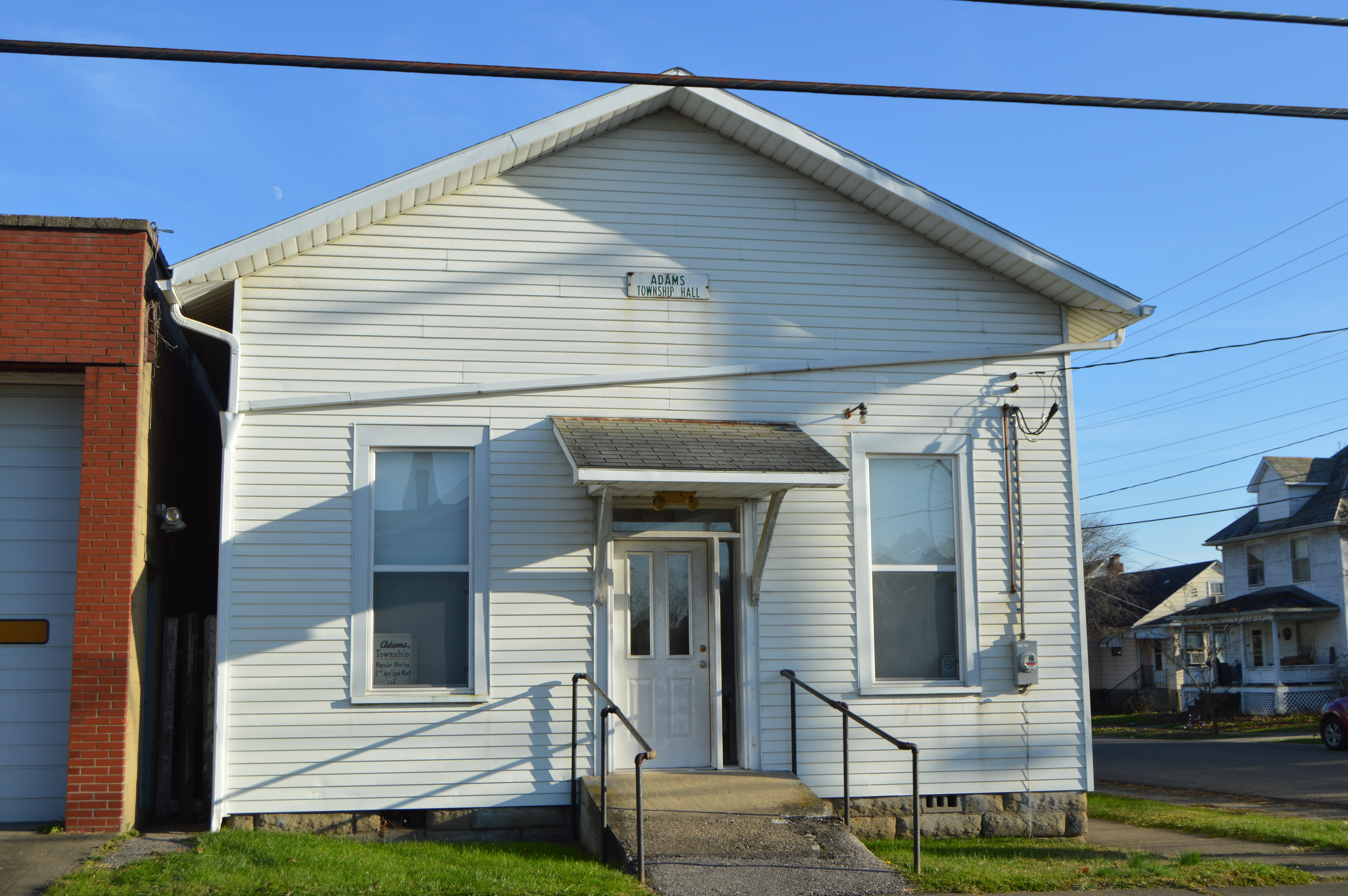
Township hall in Lowell

The township is governed by a three-member board of trustees, who are elected in November of odd-numbered years to a four-year term beginning on the following January 1. Two are elected in the year after the presidential election and one is elected in the year before it. There is also an elected township fiscal officer, who serves a four-year term beginning on April 1 of the year after the election, which is held in November of the year before the presidential election. Vacancies in the fiscal officership or on the board of trustees are filled by the remaining trustees.
