= Watertown Township, Washington County, Ohio =

Township in Ohio, US

- Township
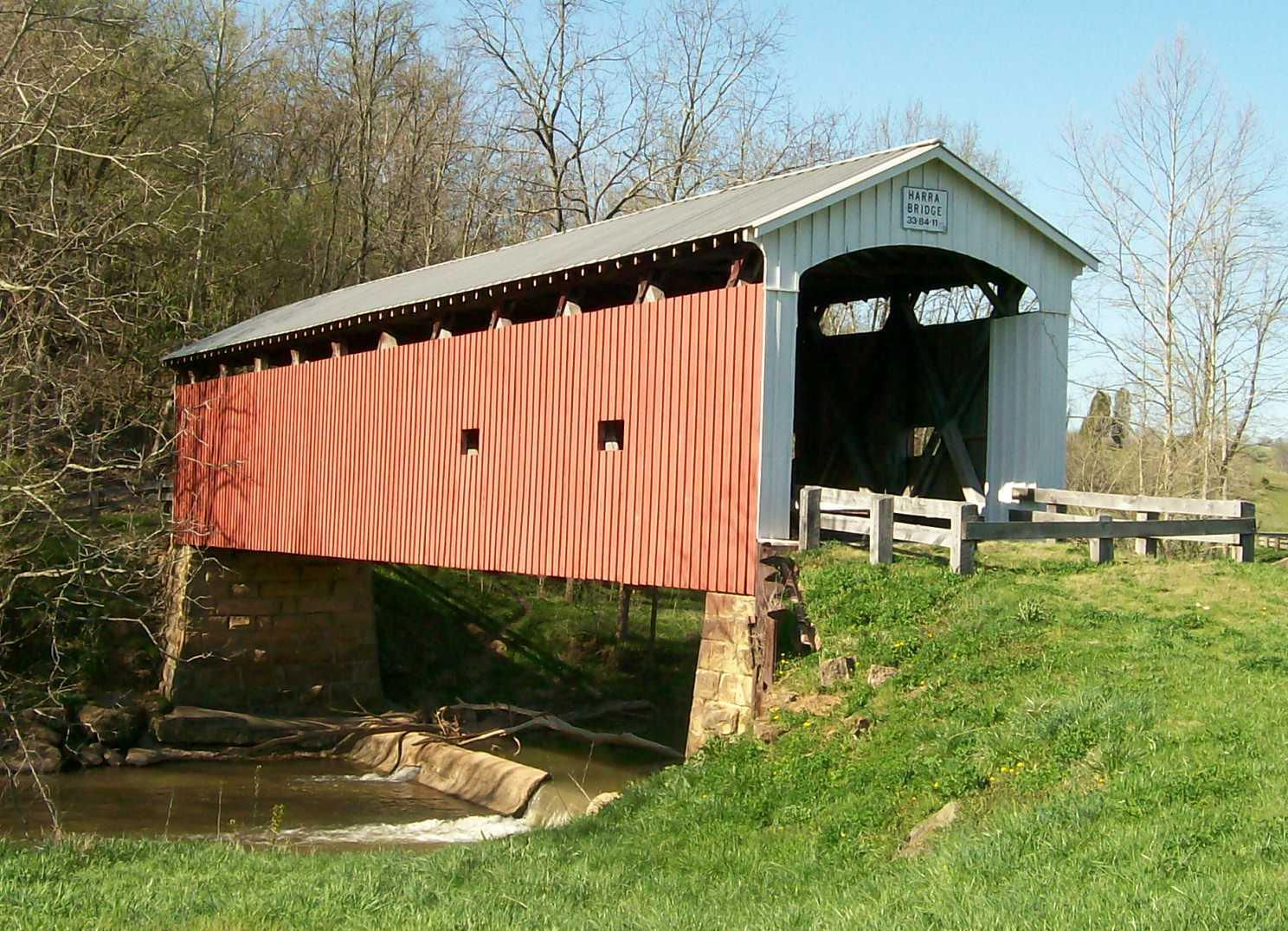
- The Harra Covered Bridge

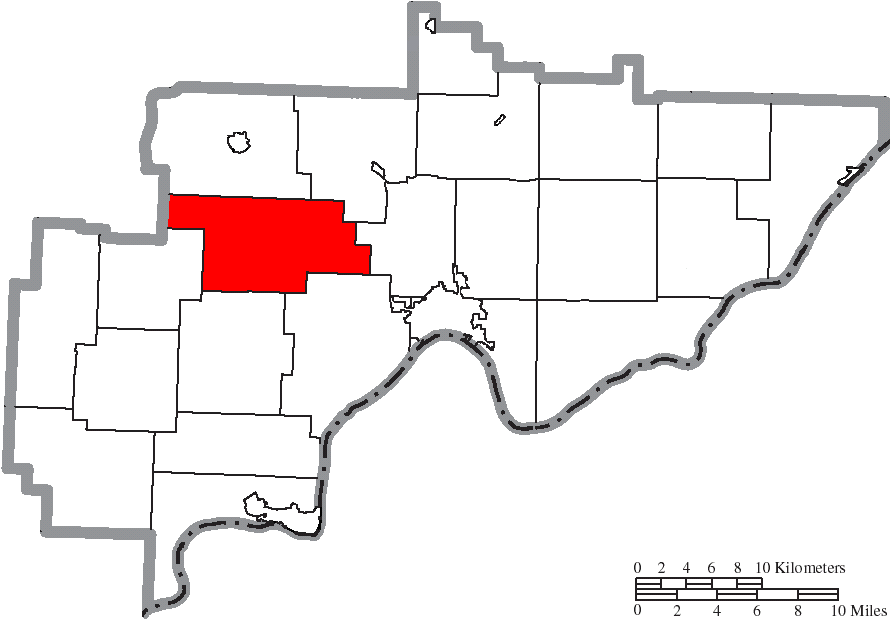
- Location of Watertown Township in Washington County
- Coordinates: 39°28′10″N 81°36′28″W
- Country: United States
- State: Ohio
- County: Washington

Area
  - Total: 36.5 sq mi (94.5 km^{2})
  - Land: 36.5 sq mi (94.5 km^{2})
  - Water: 0 sq mi (0.0 km^{2})
- Elevation: 764 ft (233 m)

Population (2020)
  - Total: 1,541
  - Density: 42.2/sq mi (16.3/km^{2})
- Time zone: UTC-5 (Eastern (EST))
  - Summer (DST): UTC-4 (EDT)
- ZIP code: 45787
- Area code: 740
- FIPS code: 39-81844
- GNIS feature ID: 1087146

Watertown Township is one of the twenty-two townships of Washington County, Ohio, United States. The 2020 census found 1,541 people in the township.

== Geography ==
Located in the northwestern part of the county, it borders the following townships:

- Waterford Township - north
- Adams Township - northeast
- Muskingum Township - east
- Warren Township - southeast
- Barlow Township - south
- Palmer Township - west
- Windsor Township, Morgan County - northwest

No municipalities are located in Watertown Township, although the unincorporated community of Watertown lies in the township's center.

== Name and history ==
It is the only Watertown Township statewide.

== Government ==
The township is governed by a three-member board of trustees, who are elected in November of odd-numbered years to a four-year term beginning on the following January 1. Two are elected in the year after the presidential election and one is elected in the year before it. There is also an elected township fiscal officer, who serves a four-year term beginning on April 1 of the year after the election, which is held in November of the year before the presidential election. Vacancies in the fiscal officership or on the board of trustees are filled by the remaining trustees.
