= Waterford Township, Washington County, Ohio =

Township in Ohio, US

- Township
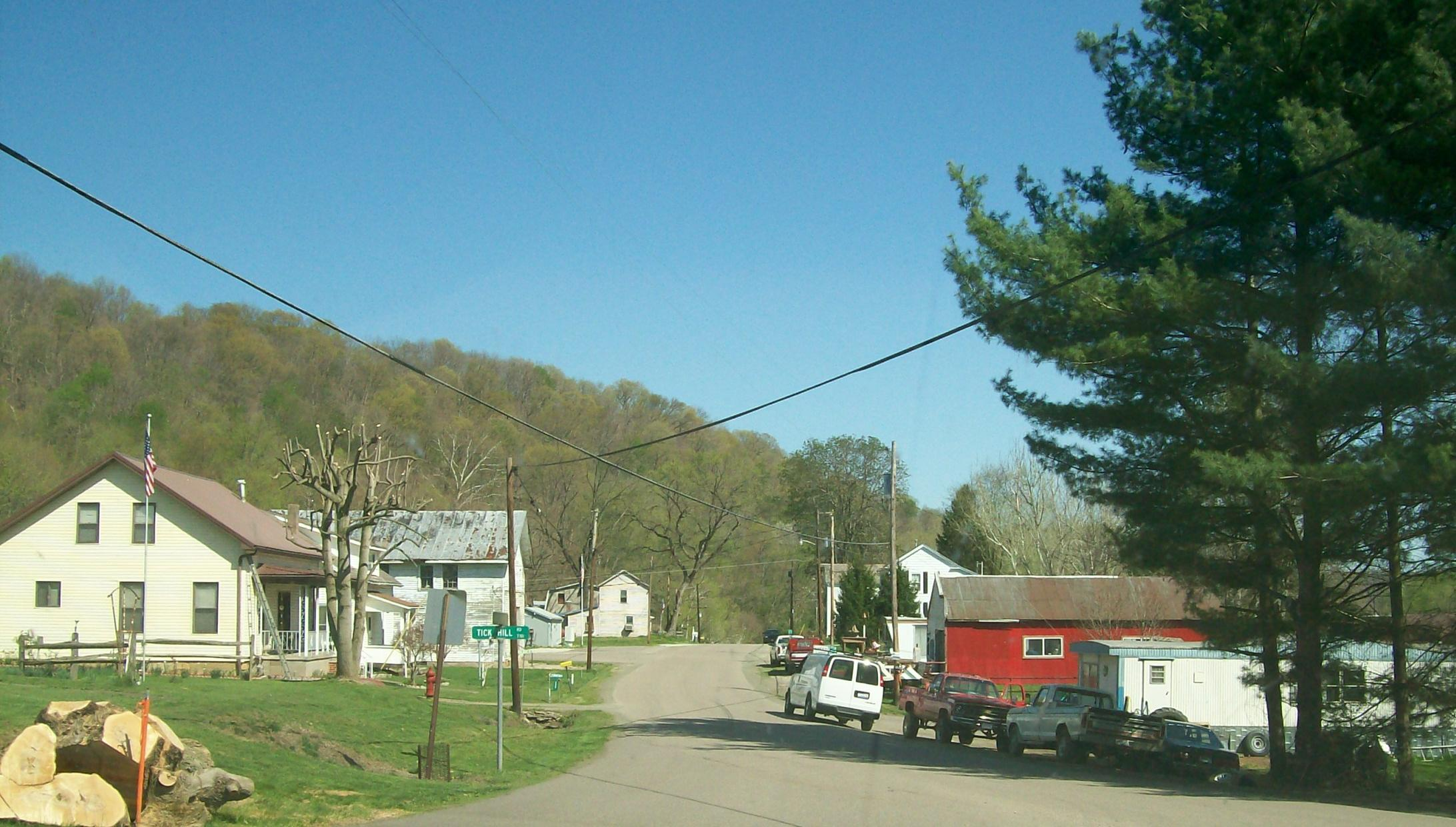
- Street scene in Coal Run

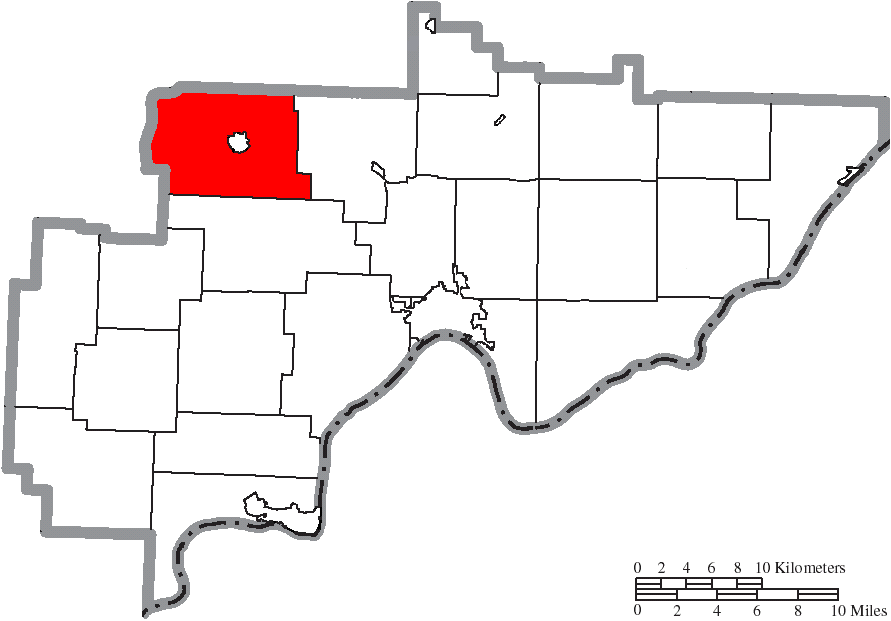
- Location of Waterford Township in Washington County
- Coordinates: 39°33′5″N 81°38′58″W
- Country: United States
- State: Ohio
- County: Washington

Area
  - Total: 38.8 sq mi (100.5 km^{2})
  - Land: 37.6 sq mi (97.4 km^{2})
  - Water: 1.2 sq mi (3.1 km^{2})
- Elevation: 807 ft (246 m)

Population (2020)
  - Total: 3,547
  - Density: 94/sq mi (36.4/km^{2})
- Time zone: UTC-5 (Eastern (EST))
  - Summer (DST): UTC-4 (EDT)
- ZIP code: 45786
- Area code: 740
- FIPS code: 39-81774
- GNIS feature ID: 1087145

Waterford Township is one of the twenty-two townships of Washington County, Ohio, United States. The 2020 census found 3,547 people in the township

== Geography ==
Located in the northwestern corner of the county, it borders the following townships:

- Center Township, Morgan County - north
- Jackson Township, Noble County - northeast corner
- Adams Township - east
- Watertown Township - south
- Windsor Township, Morgan County - west

The village of Beverly is located in central Beverly Township, and the unincorporated communities of Coal Run and Waterford lie in the township's northeast and south.

== Name and history ==
It is the only Waterford Township statewide.

== Government ==
The township is governed by a three-member board of trustees, who are elected in November of odd-numbered years to a four-year term beginning on the following January 1. Two are elected in the year after the presidential election and one is elected in the year before it. There is also an elected township fiscal officer, who serves a four-year term beginning on April 1 of the year after the election, which is held in November of the year before the presidential election. Vacancies in the fiscal officership or on the board of trustees are filled by the remaining trustees.
