= Mason House (Coal Run, Ohio) =

Historic house in Ohio, United States

- U.S. National Register of Historic Places
- U.S. Historic district – Contributing property
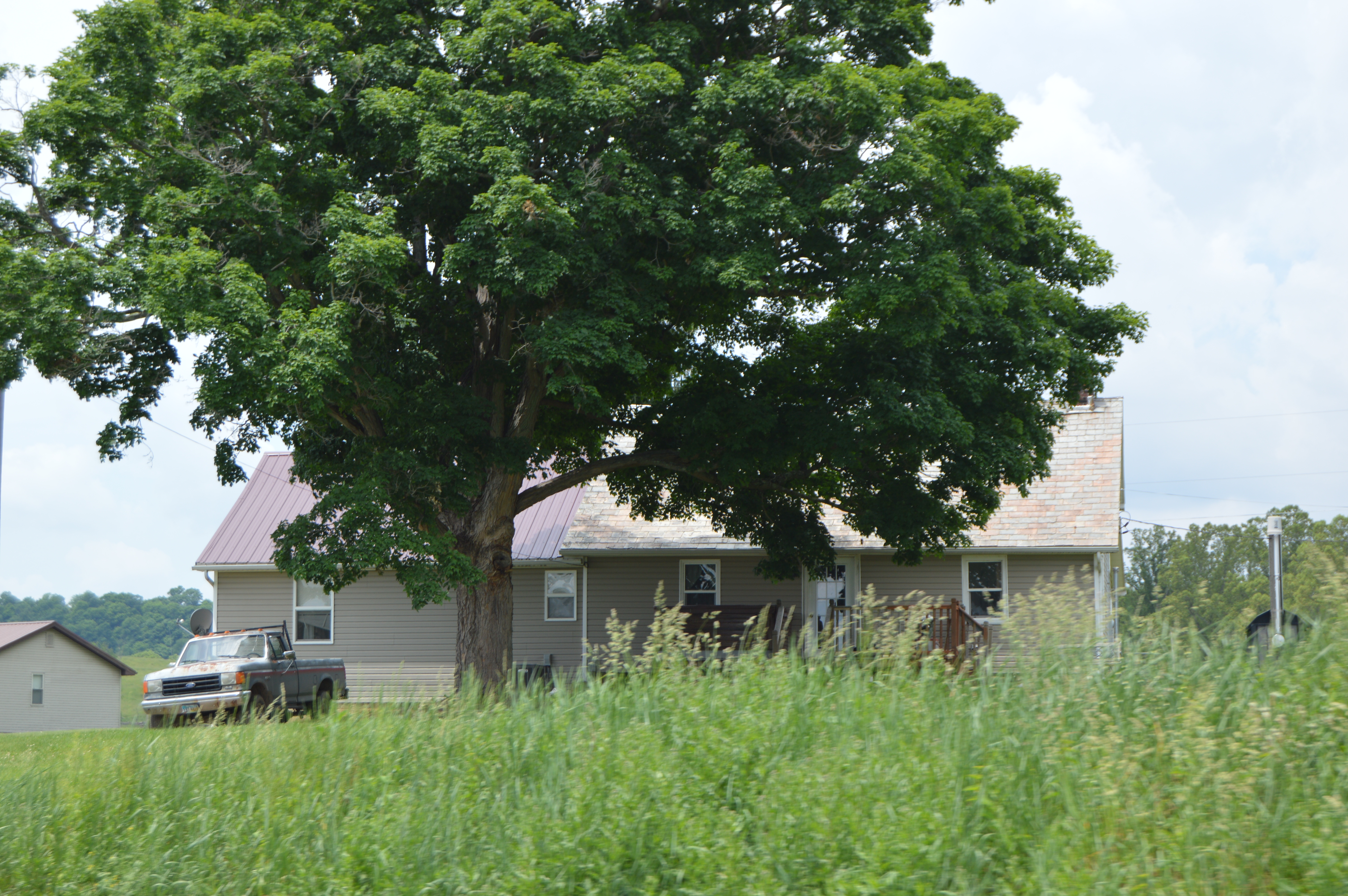
- Northern side of the house, with a later addition at left

- Location within Ohio Location within the United States
- Location: Township Road 393, Coal Run, Ohio
- Coordinates: 39°33′50″N 81°35′5″W
- Area: 0.3 acres (0.12 ha)
- Built: 1802
- Architect: Daniel Davis, Joseph Thompson
- Architectural style: Saltbox
- Part of: Coal Run Historic District (ID96000115)
- NRHP reference No.: 79001978
- Added to NRHP: November 29, 1979

The Mason House is a historic residence in the unincorporated community of Coal Run in Washington County, Ohio, United States. A saltbox built in 1802, it is among the most well-preserved buildings in Washington County constructed before Ohio's statehood in 1803.

The Mason House is a wooden clapboard structure built on a foundation of sandstone; it is covered with a slate roof, and its architecture includes elements made of brick and of other kinds of stone. Its first owners (and likely its builders) were Daniel Davis and Joseph Thompson; a veteran of local Indian wars, Davis was a member of the garrison for Fort Frye in nearby Waterford. The Mason House's first residents, like many other pioneers in southeastern Ohio, were natives of New England who had moved to what was then the western part of the United States. Among the cultural elements that they brought with them was their architecture; the saltbox style of construction is more common in New England than in Ohio.

In 1979, the Mason House was listed on the National Register of Historic Places; it qualified for inclusion because of its well-preserved and historically significant architecture. Seventeen years later, much of Coal Run was designated a historic district and added to the Register; the Mason House was named one of its eighty-nine contributing properties.

== See also ==
- Montgomery Saltbox Houses, near Cincinnati
