= Aurelius Township, Ohio =

Township in Ohio, US

Aurelius Township, Washington County, Ohio
- Township
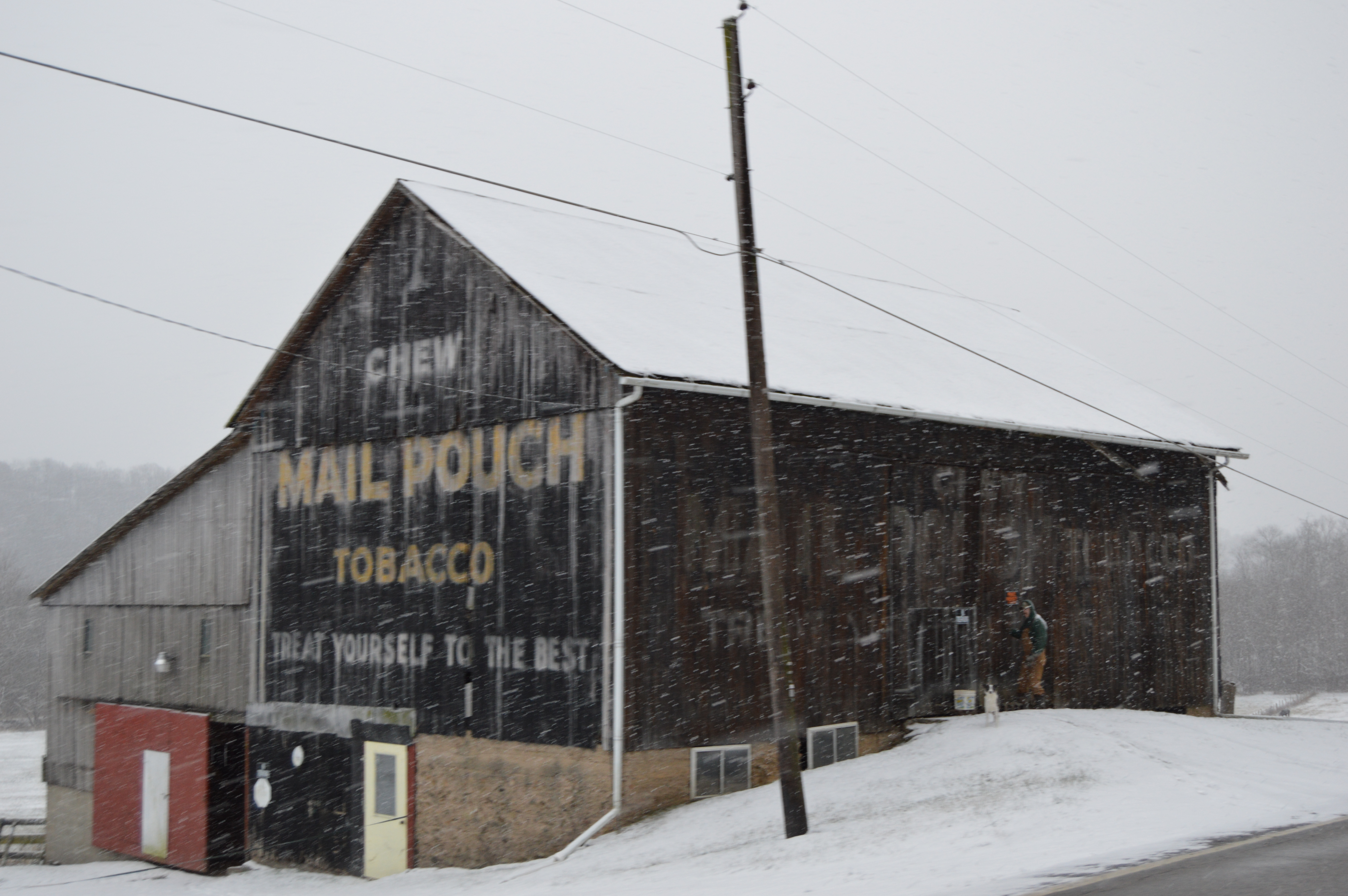
- A Mail Pouch Tobacco Barn on State Route 821, southeast of Macksburg

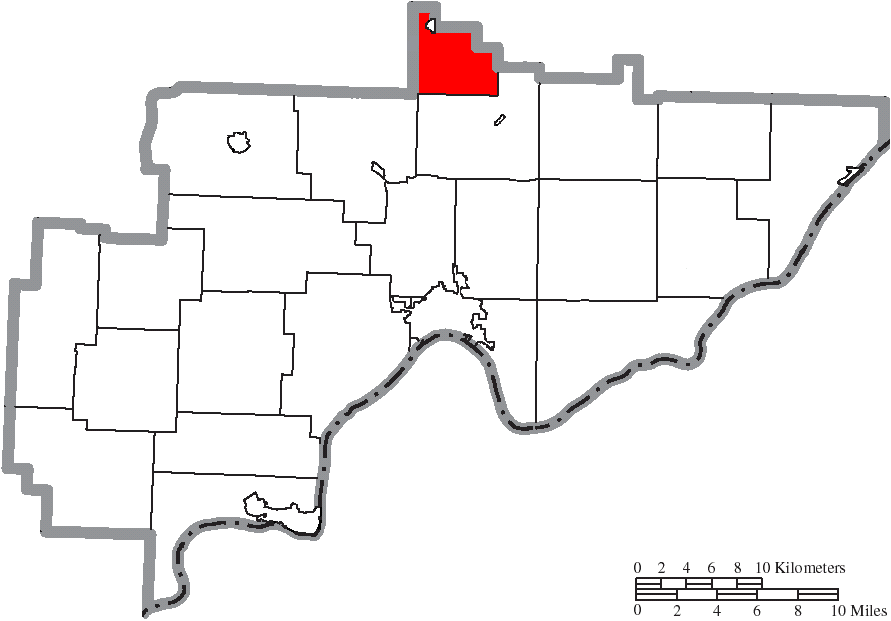
- Location of Aurelius Township in Washington County
- Coordinates: 39°37′8″N 81°26′20″W
- Country: United States
- State: Ohio
- County: Washington

Area
  - Total: 14.1 sq mi (36.6 km^{2})
  - Land: 14.1 sq mi (36.6 km^{2})
  - Water: 0 sq mi (0.0 km^{2})
- Elevation: 922 ft (281 m)

Population (2020)
  - Total: 326
  - Density: 23.1/sq mi (8.91/km^{2})
- Time zone: UTC-5 (Eastern (EST))
  - Summer (DST): UTC-4 (EDT)
- FIPS code: 39-03072
- GNIS feature ID: 1087125

Aurelius Township is one of the twenty-two townships of Washington County, Ohio, United States. The 2020 census found 326 people in the township.

== Geography ==
Located in the far northern part of the county, it borders the following townships:

- Jefferson Township, Noble County - north
- Salem Township - south
- Adams Township - southwest corner
- Jackson Township, Noble County - west

The village of Macksburg is located in northern Aurelius Township.

== Name and history ==
It is the only Aurelius Township statewide.

== Government ==
The township is governed by a three-member board of trustees, who are elected in November of odd-numbered years to a four-year term beginning on the following January 1. Two are elected in the year after the presidential election and one is elected in the year before it. There is also an elected township fiscal officer, who serves a four-year term beginning on April 1 of the year after the election, which is held in November of the year before the presidential election. Vacancies in the fiscal officership or on the board of trustees are filled by the remaining trustees.
