= Waernicke–Hille House and Store =

Historic house in Ohio, United States

- Waernicke–Hille House And Store
- U.S. National Register of Historic Places
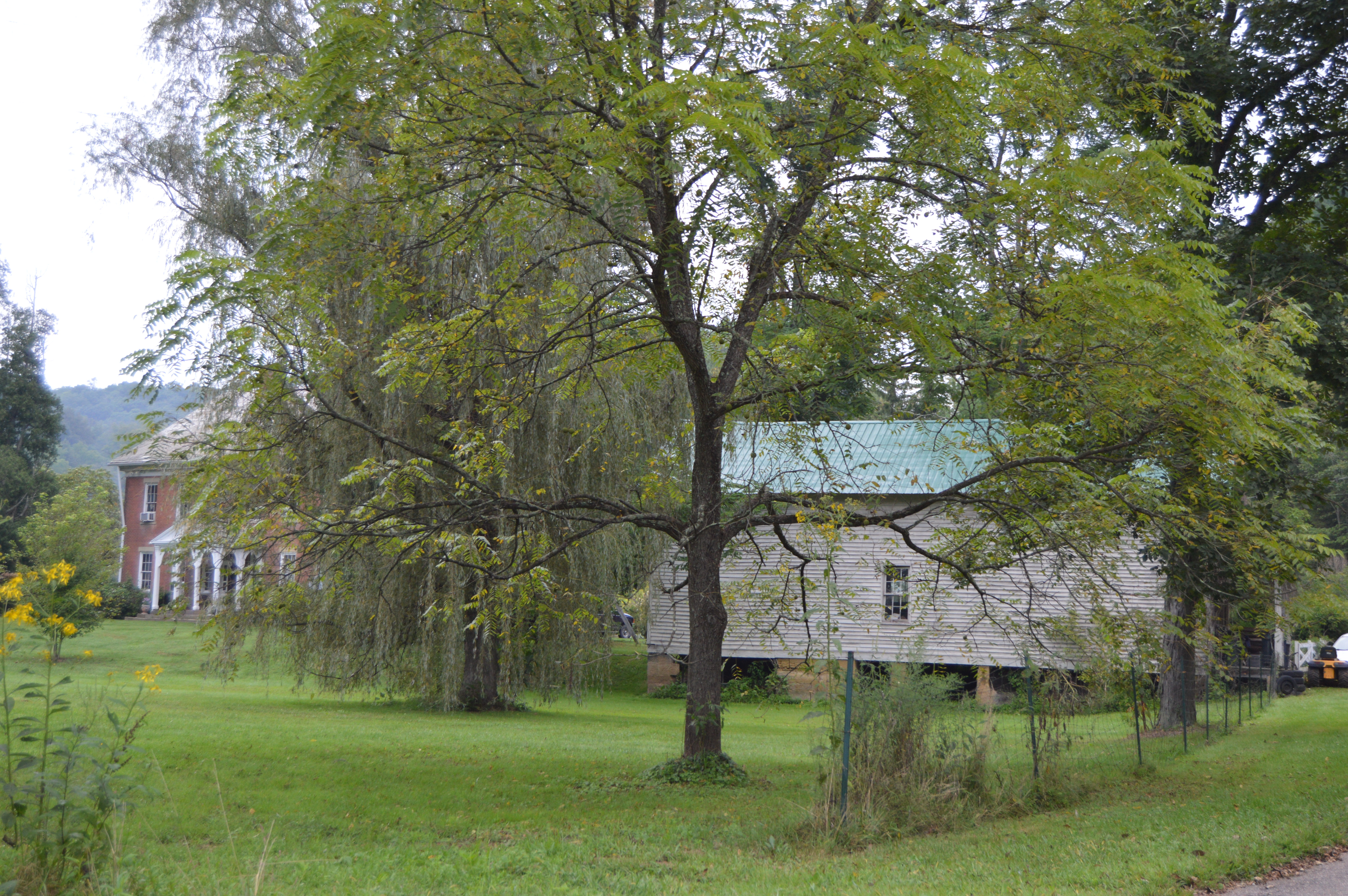
- House (left) and store (right)

- Location within Ohio Location within the United States
- Location: Township Road 36, Archer's Fork, Ohio
- Coordinates: 39°29′3″N 81°12′19″W
- Area: 3 acres (1.2 ha)
- Built: 1864
- NRHP reference No.: 79001977
- Added to NRHP: November 29, 1979

The Waernicke–Hille House and Store are a pair of historic buildings located near the community of Archer's Fork in Washington County, Ohio, United States. Located approximately 150 feet (46 m) away from each other, the two buildings lie along Township Road 36. The store and three-story house were both constructed for the families of Ernst Waernicke, a German who pioneered the cultivation of tobacco in the surrounding Independence Township. Along with other Germans, Waernicke induced significant growth in Independence Township through the cultivation of tobacco, starting in the 1850s.

Architecturally, the two buildings are significantly different: the store is a frame structure, while the house is constructed of brick on a foundation of sandstone. Although it was constructed in 1864, it predates all other brick houses in Independence Township. In late 1979, the house and store were listed on the National Register of Historic Places in recognition of the important place that they occupy in architectural history and because of their connection to leading local citizens. The area designated as historic encompasses approximately 3 acres (1.2 ha) and includes three small buildings on the property in addition to the store and house.
