= Henry Covered Bridge (Ohio) =

Coordinates: 39°23′0″N 81°47′7″W

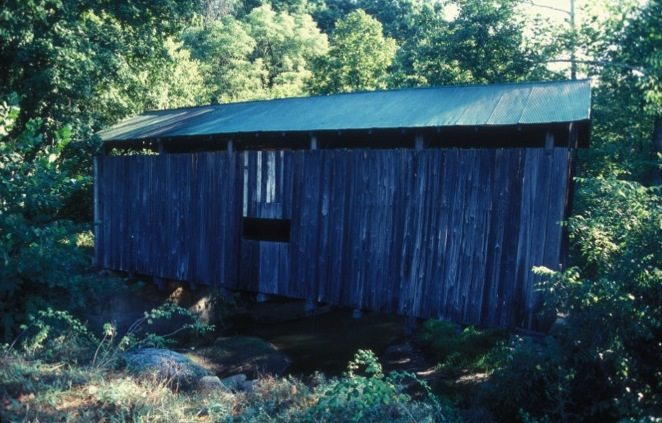
Henry Covered Bridge

The Henry Covered Bridge near Bartlett, Ohio is a historic covered bridge. The bridge is on TR61 off OH550 southeast of Bartlett, Ohio, in Washington County, Ohio. It is a "Multiple Kingpost" truss type, and it is 45 feet long, and was built in 1894.
