= Dart, Ohio =

Unincorporated community in Ohio, U.S.

Coordinates: 39°29′10″N 81°16′27″W

Dart is an unincorporated community in Washington County, in the U.S. state of Ohio.

== History ==
A post office called Dart was established in 1905, and remained in operation until 1984. According to tradition, the townspeople were searching for a suitable name when they saw a bird flying "like a dart".

Dart was the home of Lawrence Elementary School, a former part of the Frontier Local School District, until it closed in 2014 due to low enrollment. The school had served in the past as the primary high school for the district, but got smaller and less relevant within the district after the creation of Frontier High School, and dropping population for the surrounding area.
