= Watertown, Ohio =

Unincorporated community in Ohio, U.S.

- Watertown Historic District
- U.S. National Register of Historic Places
- U.S. Historic district
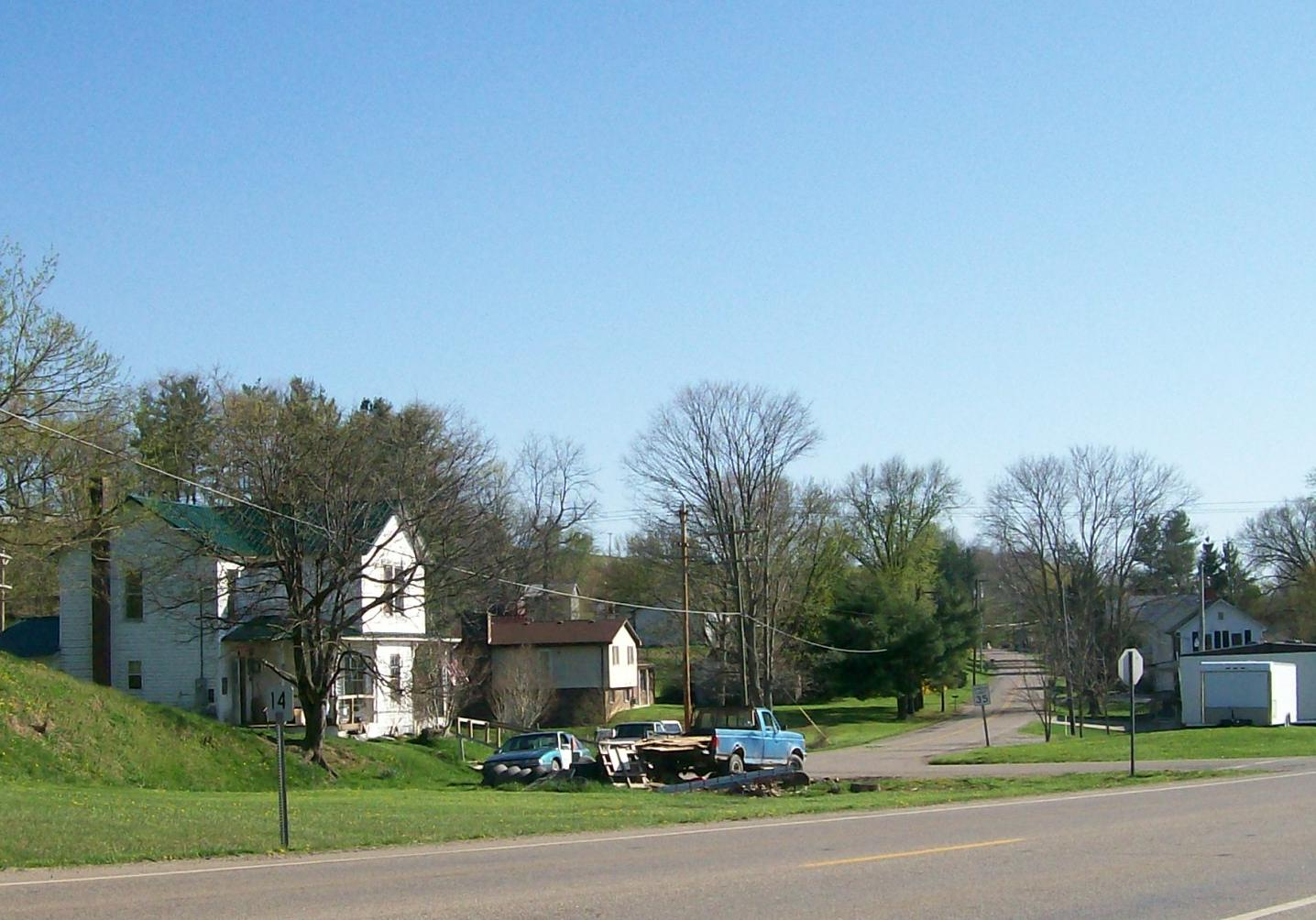
- The Watertown Historic District in 2010.

- Location within Ohio Location within the United States
- Location: East of State Route 339 and north of State Route 676
- Coordinates: 39°27′59″N 81°37′57″W
- Area: 60 acres (24 ha)
- Architectural style: Stick-Eastlake, Italianate
- NRHP reference No.: 86000728
- Added to NRHP: April 10, 1986

Watertown is an unincorporated community in southwestern Watertown Township, Washington County, Ohio, United States. It has a post office with the ZIP code 45787. It lies near the intersection of State Routes 339 and 676 near Wolf Creek, which meets the Muskingum River at Waterford to the north.

== History ==
A post office called Watertown was established in 1826, and remained in operation until 1993. The first postmaster also was the town's first merchant when he opened a store in 1828.

In 1986, the community was listed on the National Register of Historic Places in 1986 as a historic district, the "Watertown Historic District." Seventy-five buildings compose the district: three are built of brick, and the rest are white weatherboarded structures. Most of the contributing properties were built after the Civil War and before World War I. The importance of the district is derived from the architecture of most of its houses, largely because local carpenters made extensive use of Stick-Eastlake ornamental elements in their designs.
