= Harra Covered Bridge =

- U.S. National Register of Historic Places
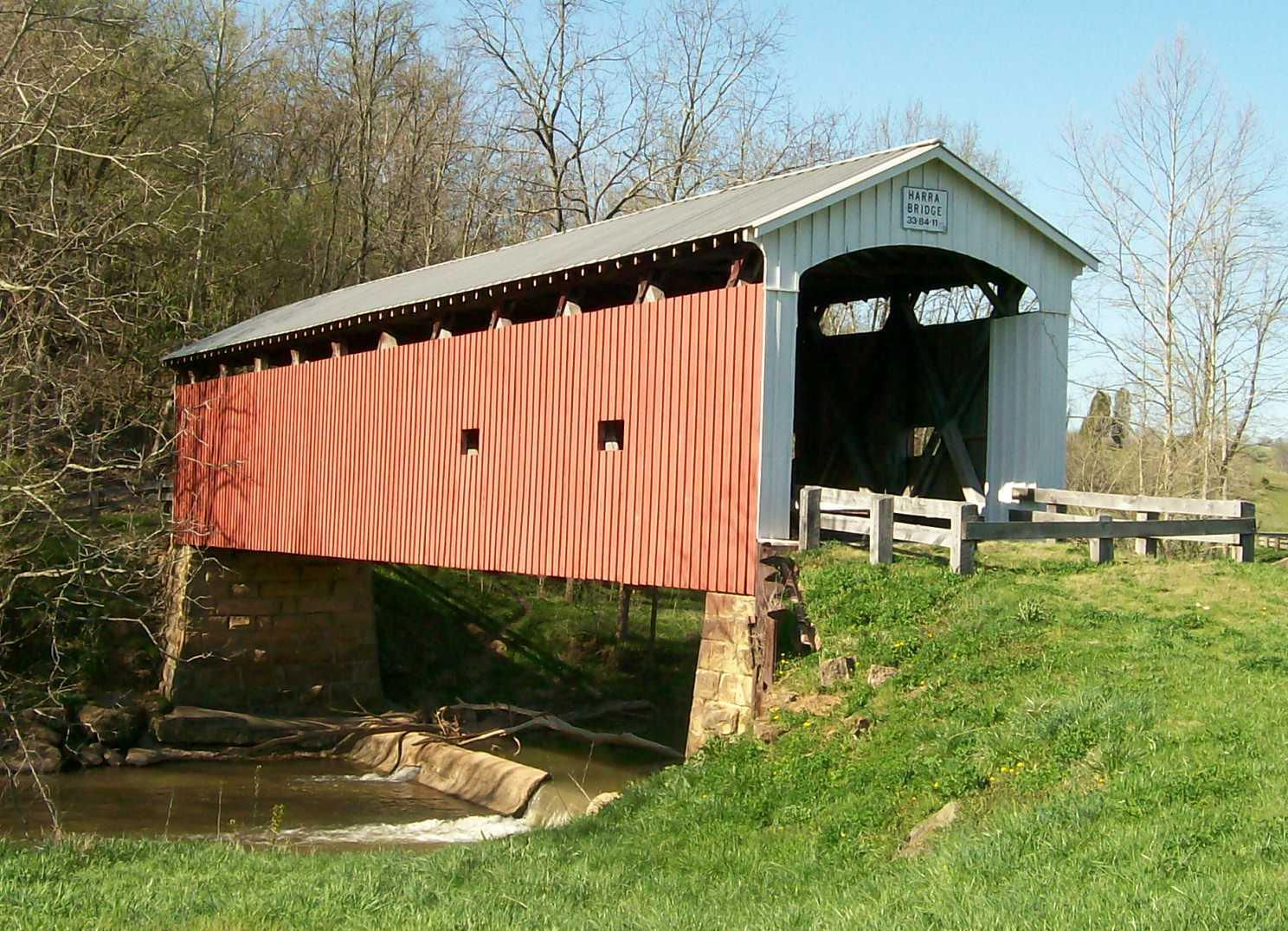
- The bridge in April 2010.

- Location within Ohio Location within the United States
- Nearest city: Watertown, Ohio
- Coordinates: 39°29′16″N 81°38′53″W
- Area: 0.9 acres (0.36 ha)
- Built: 1875
- Architect: William Meredith
- Architectural style: Long truss
- NRHP reference No.: 76001547
- Added to NRHP: October 8, 1976

The Harra Covered Bridge is a historic wooden covered bridge in Washington County, Ohio, United States. Located in western Watertown Township, about 2 miles (3.2 km) north of the community of Watertown, the bridge spans the South Branch of Wolf Creek near the intersection of State Route 339 and Township Road 172. Among the bridge's more distinctive features are its cut stone abutments, its metal roof, and the vertical siding. Although it has been open for well over one hundred years, it remains in strong structural condition, and it served daily traffic into the late twentieth century.

A single-span structure completed in 1875, the bridge was constructed under the leadership of Marietta bridge builder William Meredith. One of his primary employees was stonemason Billy Gamble, who used locally quarried stone to construct the abutments. The source for this stone was the farm of James Harrah, whose name (minus its final letter) was given to the bridge. The plan for the bridge used the Long truss design; fewer than ten historic Long truss bridges remain in Ohio today. In 1976, the Harra Bridge was listed on the National Register of Historic Places, qualifying both because of its historically significant architecture and because of its importance in the history of Ohio.
