= Shinn Covered Bridge =

- U.S. National Register of Historic Places
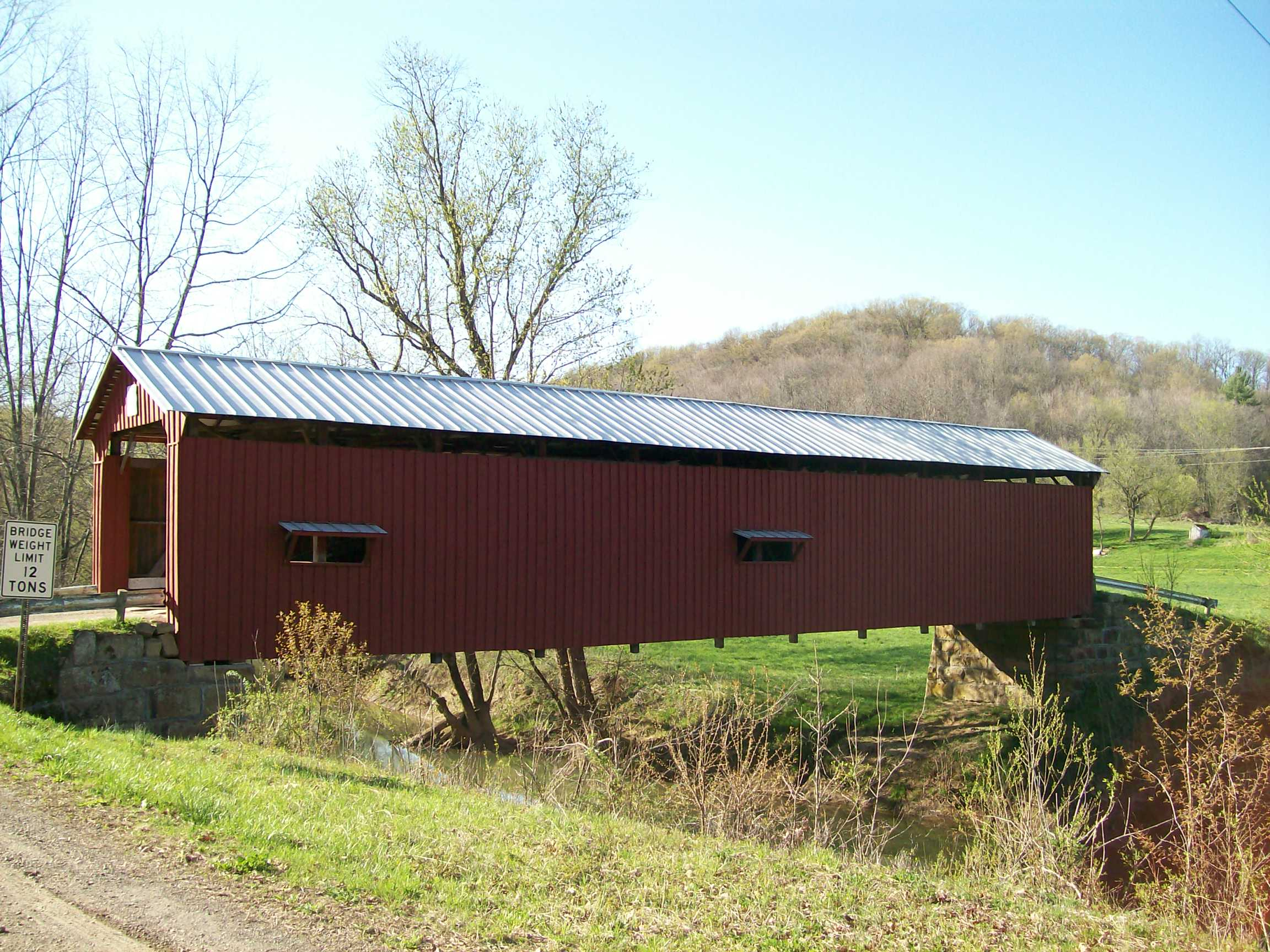
- Eastern (downstream) side of the bridge

- Location within Ohio Location within the United States
- Location: Northeast of Bartlett in Palmer Township
- Nearest city: Bartlett, Ohio
- Coordinates: 39°27′46″N 81°45′40″W
- Area: Less than 1 acre (0.40 ha)
- Built: 1886
- Architect: Charles T. Shinn
- Architectural style: Burr Arch Truss
- NRHP reference No.: 76001544
- Added to NRHP: October 8, 1976

The Shinn Covered Bridge is a historic wooden covered bridge in the southeastern part of the U.S. state of Ohio. Located in the countryside northeast of Bartlett in Washington County, this single-span truss bridge was built in 1886 by local carpenter Charles T. Shinn. Built of weatherboarded walls with stone abutments and a metal roof, the bridge features vertical siding, and its portals have remained vertical and resisted creeping into another shape. The heart of the bridge's structure employs the Burr Truss design, which mixes the king post truss with a wooden arch designed by Andrea Palladio in the sixteenth century. Shinn built his bridge to span the western branch of Wolf Creek in Palmer Township. Measuring 98 feet (30 m) in length, the bridge was constructed soon after the drowning of one of Shinn's children.

In 1976, the Shinn Bridge was listed on the National Register of Historic Places. It qualified for inclusion on the Register because of its important historic architecture and its place in the history of Ohio, for it is one of the last few examples of Burr king post arch truss bridges still standing in the state.
