= Palmer Township, Washington County, Ohio =

Township in Ohio, US

- Township
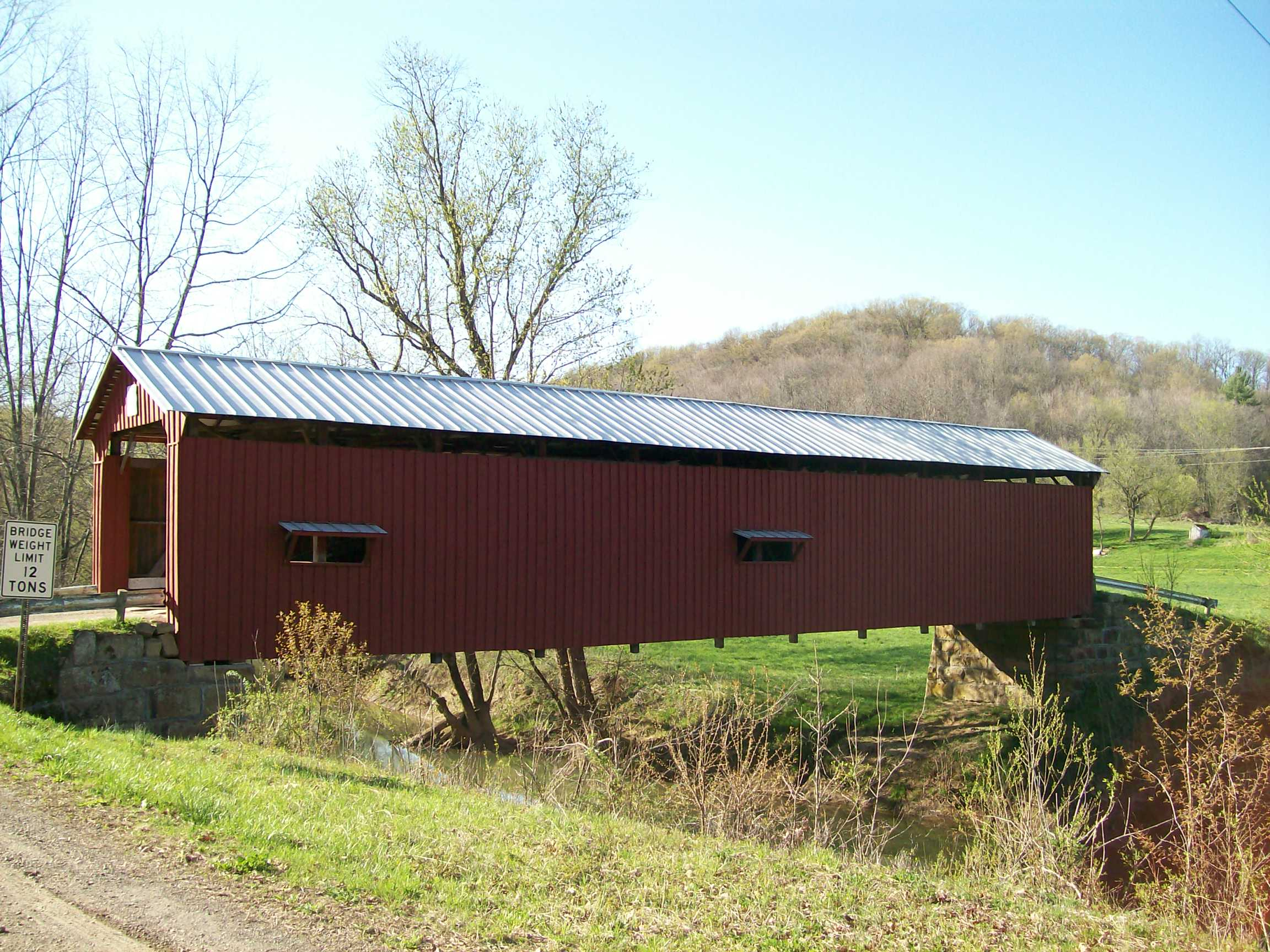
- The Shinn Covered Bridge, northeast of Bartlett

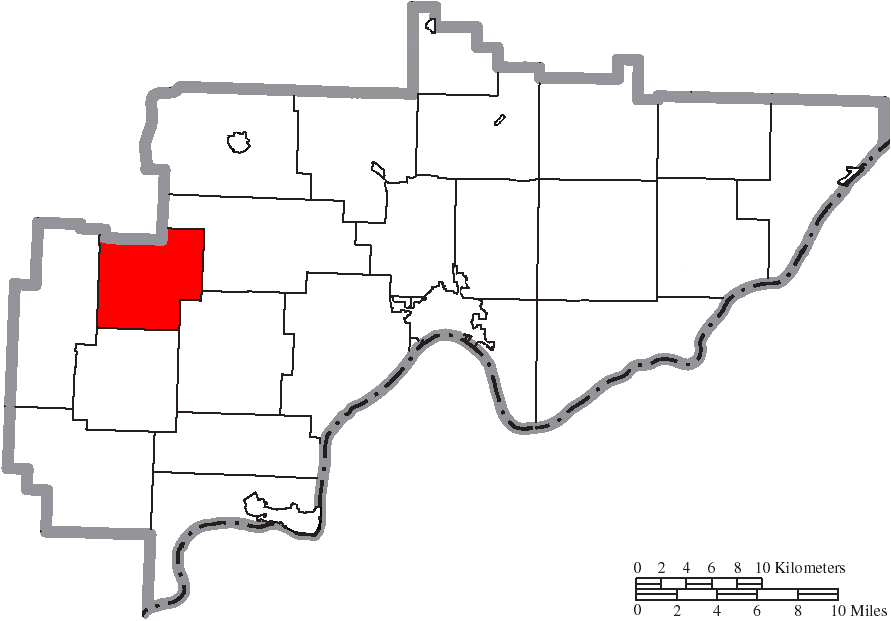
- Location of Palmer Township in Washington County
- Coordinates: 39°27′19″N 81°43′25″W
- Country: United States
- State: Ohio
- County: Washington

Area
  - Total: 22.6 sq mi (58.6 km^{2})
  - Land: 22.6 sq mi (58.6 km^{2})
  - Water: 0 sq mi (0.0 km^{2})
- Elevation: 827 ft (252 m)

Population (2020)
  - Total: 547
  - Density: 24.2/sq mi (9.33/km^{2})
- Time zone: UTC-5 (Eastern (EST))
  - Summer (DST): UTC-4 (EDT)
- FIPS code: 39-59626
- GNIS feature ID: 1087142

Palmer Township is one of the twenty-two townships of Washington County, Ohio, United States. The 2020 census found 547 people in the township.

== Geography ==
Located in the western part of the county, it borders the following townships:

- Watertown Township - northeast
- Barlow Township - southeast
- Fairfield Township - south
- Wesley Township - west
- Windsor Township, Morgan County - northwest

No municipalities are located in Palmer Township.

== Name and history ==
Statewide, the only other Palmer Township is located in Putnam County.

Within Palmer Township is located the Shinn Covered Bridge, which is listed on the National Register of Historic Places.

== Government ==
The township is governed by a three-member board of trustees, who are elected in November of odd-numbered years to a four-year term beginning on the following January 1. Two are elected in the year after the presidential election and one is elected in the year before it. There is also an elected township fiscal officer, who serves a four-year term beginning on April 1 of the year after the election, which is held in November of the year before the presidential election. Vacancies in the fiscal officership or on the board of trustees are filled by the remaining trustees.
