= Hildreth Covered Bridge =

- U.S. National Register of Historic Places
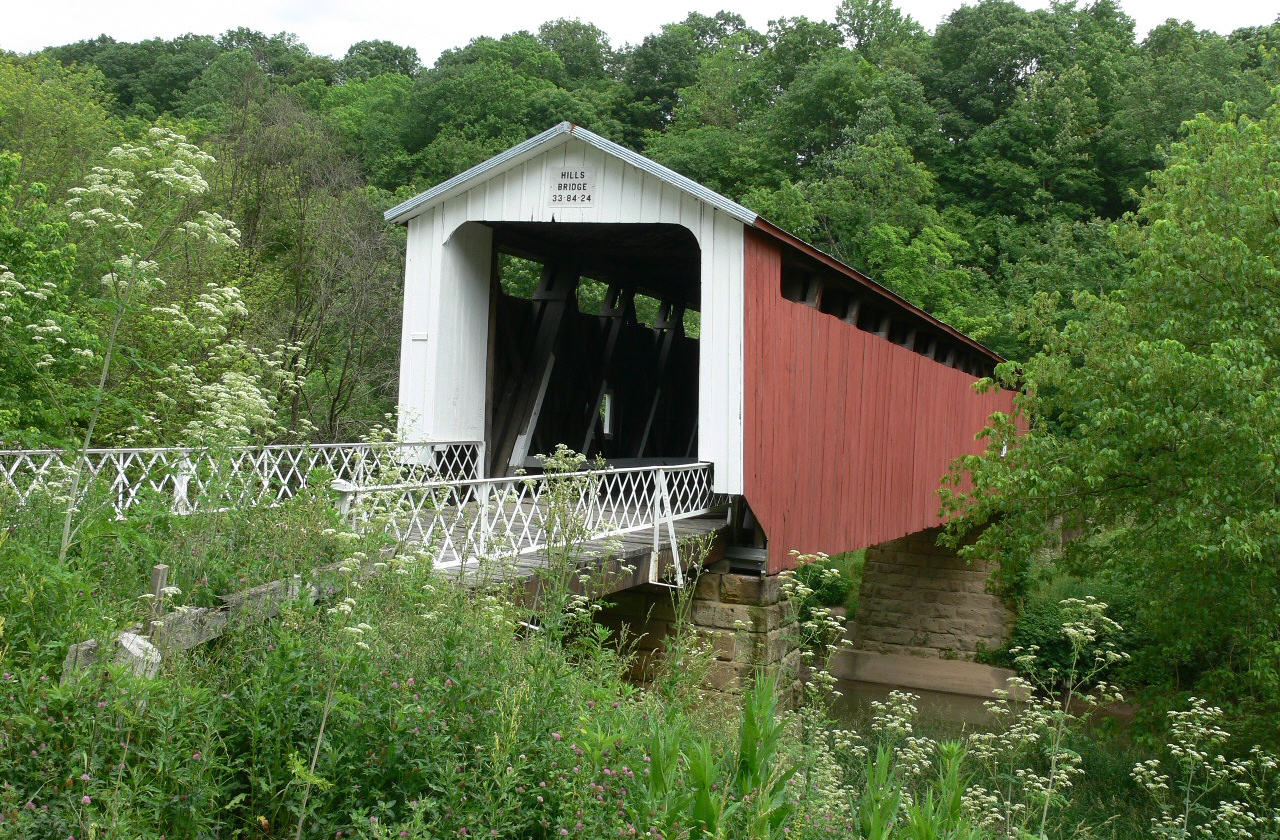
- Western end of the bridge

- Location within Ohio Location within the United States
- Nearest city: Marietta, Ohio
- Coordinates: 39°25′38″N 81°21′42″W
- Area: less than one acre
- Built: 1878
- Architect: Hocking Valley Bridge Works
- Architectural style: Howe truss
- NRHP reference No.: 78002211
- Added to NRHP: February 8, 1978

The Hildreth Covered Bridge, also known as the "Hills Covered Bridge" or "Lafaber's Mill Bridge," is a historic covered bridge in Washington County, Ohio, United States. Located off State Route 26 in Newport Township, about 5 miles (8.0 km) east of the city of Marietta, the bridge historically carried Hills Bridge Road over the Little Muskingum River. Construction of the Hildreth Bridge was a long process: the most significant amount of work was done on the bridge in 1878, but the entire construction process occurred between 1871 and 1881. The identity of its builder is unknown.

One of three covered bridges that span the Little Muskingum, the Hildreth Bridge is a single-span wooden Howe truss bridge that rests on abutments and piers of ashlar. It features structural elements such as a metal roof, vertical siding, and portals with battens. Due to its great height above the stream below, the bridge has been seen by locals as one of the most impressive of the region's many covered bridges. In 1978, the Hildreth Bridge was listed on the National Register of Historic Places, qualifying both because of its place in local history and because of its historically significant construction.
