= Hune Covered Bridge =

- U.S. National Register of Historic Places
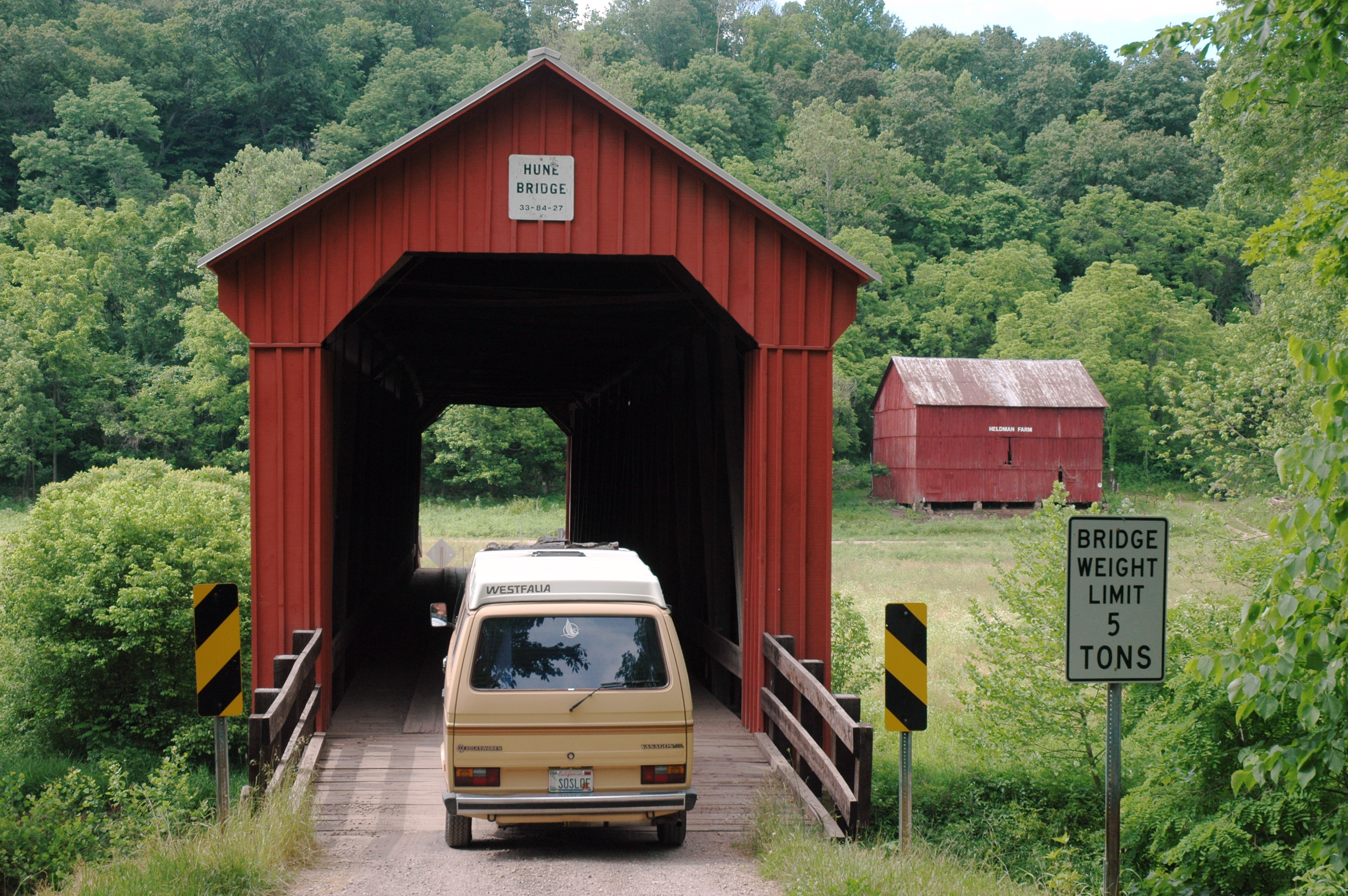
- A vehicle crossing the bridge

- Location within Ohio Location within the United States
- Location: State Route 26 in Lawrence Township, Washington County
- Nearest city: Dart, Ohio
- Coordinates: 39°30′38″N 81°15′2″W
- Area: less than one acre
- Built: 1879
- Architect: Rollin Meredith
- Architectural style: Long truss
- NRHP reference No.: 76001545
- Added to NRHP: October 8, 1976

The Hune Covered Bridge is a historic wooden covered bridge in the southeastern part of the U.S. state of Ohio. Located northeast of the community of Dart, it spans the Little Muskingum River in northeastern Lawrence Township in the eastern part of Washington County. Local bridge builder Rollin Meredith erected it in 1879, using the Long-truss style of truss bridge design; the single-span bridge was named for the locally prominent Hune family. Among its design features are a metal roof, abutments of cut stone, and vertical siding. As a Long truss, the Hune Bridge is a valuable example of nineteenth-century architecture: few examples of this complicated style survive to the present day. In 1976, the Hune Bridge was listed on the National Register of Historic Places, both because of its place in local history and because of its historically significant construction.
