= Coal Run, Ohio =

Unincorporated community in Ohio, US

- Coal Run Historic District
- U.S. National Register of Historic Places
- U.S. Historic district
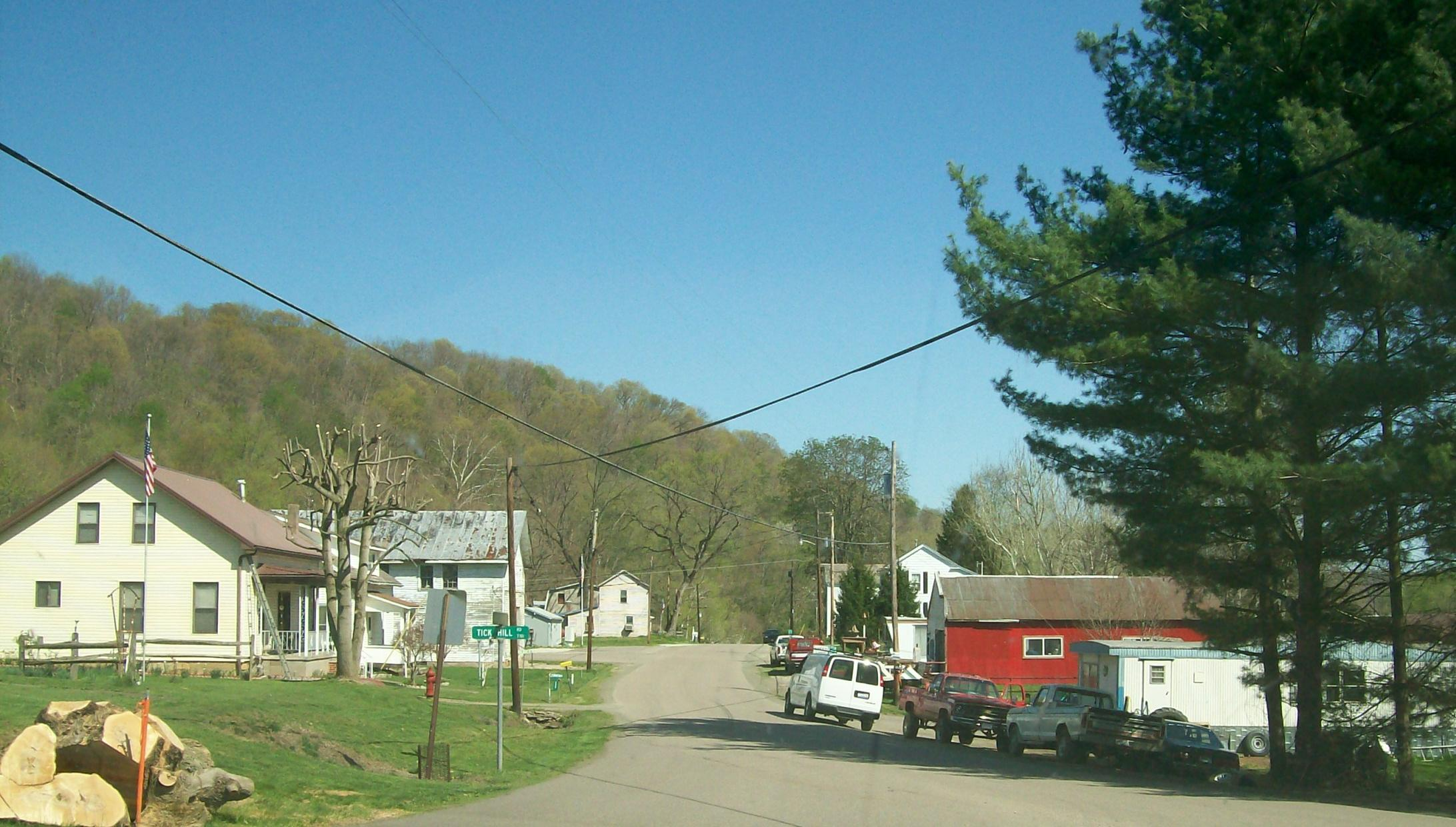
- Houses in Coal Run

- Location within Ohio Location within the United States
- Location: Roughly along Main, Maple and Hill Sts. Waterford Township, Washington County, Ohio
- Coordinates: 39°34′1″N 81°35′15″W
- Area: 138 acres (56 ha)
- Built: 1838
- Architectural style: Early Republic, Mid 19th Century Revival, Late Victorian
- NRHP reference No.: 96000115
- Added to NRHP: February 22, 1996

Coal Run is an unincorporated community in northeastern Waterford Township, Washington County, Ohio, United States. It has a post office with the ZIP code 45721. It is located along State Route 60 between the villages of Beverly and Lowell. Coal Run sits roughly 15 miles up State Route 60 from the county seat of Marietta, Ohio. The Muskingum River flows past the community.

== History ==
Coal Run was laid out and platted in 1838, and named after a nearby stream of the same name noted for its coal deposits. A post office called Coal Run was established in 1837, and remained in operation until 1997.

In 1996, Coal Run was declared a historic district and listed on the National Register of Historic Places. Eighty-seven buildings in the community, plus two other non-building sites, compose the historic district, which covers an area of approximately 138 acres (56 ha). A range of architectural styles are present in the district, including the Federal and Victorian styles. Varied as well are the uses of the buildings: many houses are present, but shops, a post office, and a cemetery are also included within its boundaries. One of the community's residences is known as the Mason House; built in 1802, it is listed on the National Register by itself as well as qualifying as a contributing property to the district.
