= Waterford, Ohio =

Census-designated place in Ohio, US

- CDP
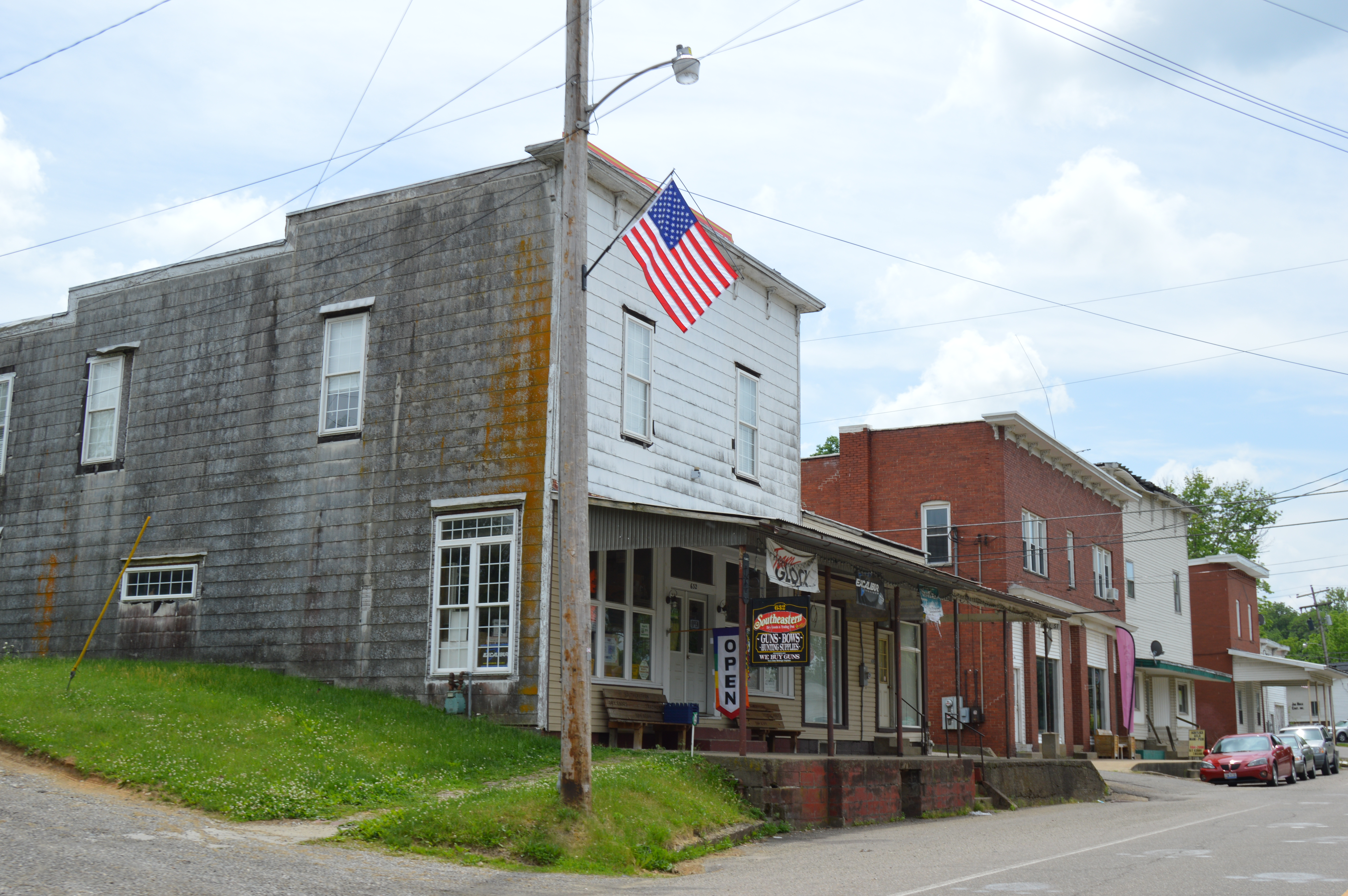
- Commercial buildings on Main Street

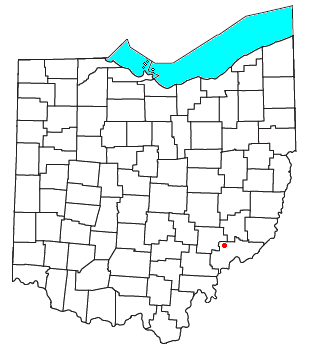
- Location of Waterford, Ohio
- Coordinates: 39°32′26″N 81°38′33″W
- Country: United States
- State: Ohio
- County: Washington
- Township: Waterford
- Elevation: 627 ft (191 m)

Population (2020)
  - Total: 384
- Time zone: UTC-5 (Eastern (EST))
  - Summer (DST): UTC-4 (EDT)
- ZIP code: 45786
- GNIS feature ID: 2628985

Waterford is a census-designated place in central Waterford Township, Washington County, Ohio, United States. It is located on State Route 339 across the Muskingum River from the village of Beverly, slightly below where Wolf Creek meets the Muskingum. The population was 384 at the 2020 census.

== History ==
Waterford was established under the name of Millburg by the Ohio Company in spring, 1789. A post office called Waterford has been in operation since 1811. The name may be derived from Waterford, Massachusetts.

== Education ==
It is in the Wolf Creek Local School District.

== Notable people ==
- Wilbur Cooper (1892–1973), baseball player
- Julia Louisa Dumont (1794–1857), educator and writer
- Stephen Powers (1840–1904), writer and ethnographer, author of Indian Tribes of California
