= Wolf Creek (Muskingum River tributary) =

Coordinates: 39.5490°N 81.6471°W

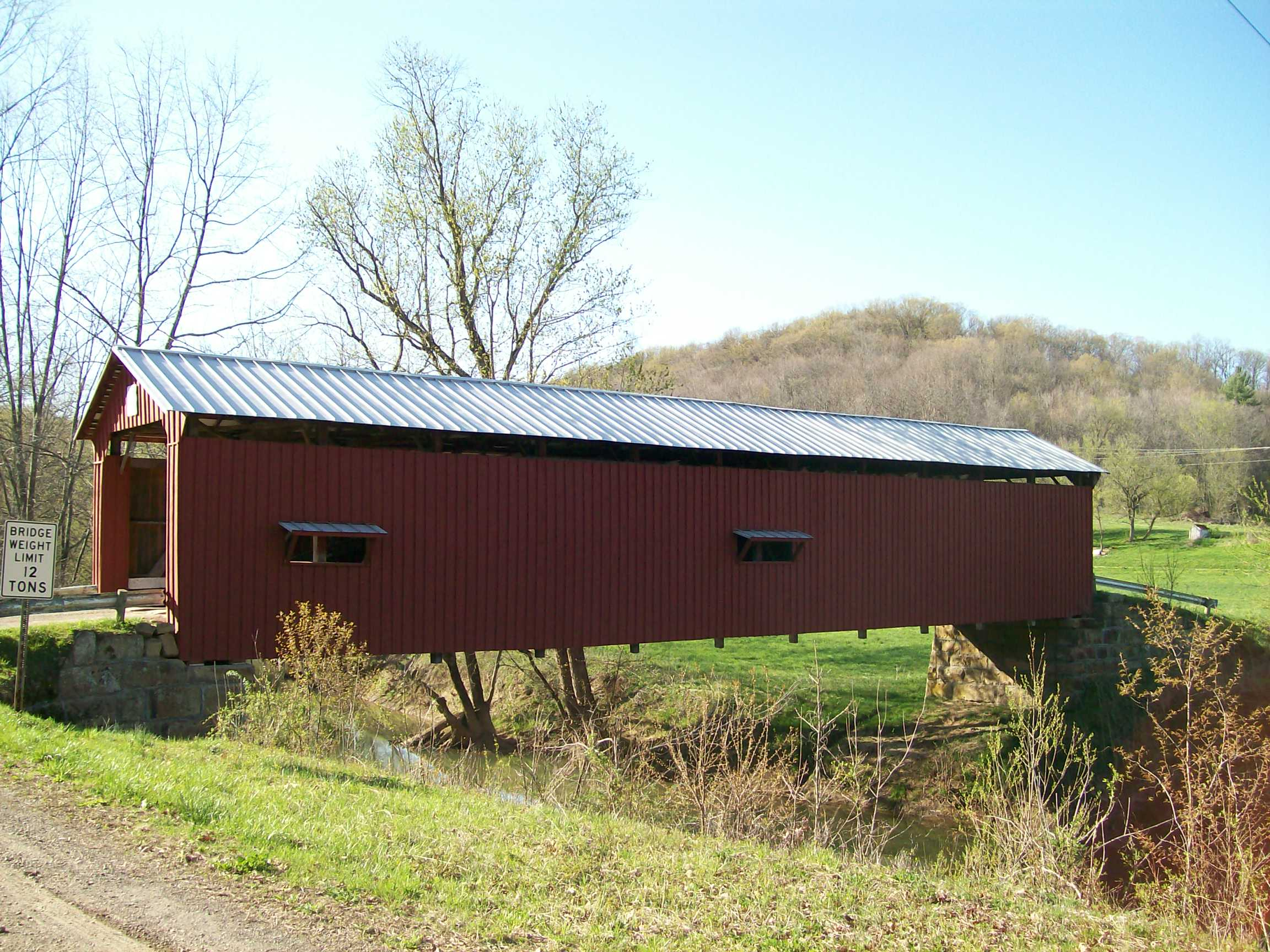
The Shinn Covered Bridge at its crossing of Wolf Creek

Wolf Creek is a tributary of the Muskingum River in the U.S. state of Ohio. It consists of two forks: the muddy fork, which begins toward Barlow, and the Clear Fork, which begins toward Chesterhill. The Clear Fork has interesting whitewater with a ledge called Chipmunk Falls and several interesting rapids which could be classified as up to class IV in difficulty. Wolf Creek also is the site of the Wolf Creek Recreation Center which once was the site of a 152-acre (0.62 km^{2}) lake but it was destroyed by a flash flood in 1950. Now this area located near McConnelsville is mostly used for hunting, fishing and hiking. The Clear Fork and Muddy Fork of Wolf Creek merge and enter the Muskingum River near Waterford.

== See also ==
- List of rivers of Ohio
