= Curtis House =

Curtis House may refer to:

== United States ==
(by state, then town)

- Curtis House (Demopolis, Alabama), listed on the National Register of Historic Places (NRHP) in Marengo County, Alabama
- Morgan-Curtis House, Phenix City, Alabama, listed on the NRHP in Russell County, Alabama
- Curtis Cottage, Prescott, Arizona, listed on the NRHP in Prescott, Arizona
- Upper Wade and Curtis Cabin, Dinosaur, Colorado
- Curtis Hardware Store, Paonia, Colorado, listed on the NRHP in Delta County, Colorado
- Sanford-Curtis-Thurber House, Newtown, Connecticut
- Nathaniel Curtis House, Stamford, Connecticut
- Curtis Mansion, Newark, Delaware, listed on the NRHP in New Castle County, Delaware
- Curtis Paper Mill Workers' Houses, Newark, Delaware, listed on the NRHP in New Castle County, Delaware
- William E. Curtis House, Tampa, Florida, listed on the NRHP in Florida
- Charles Curtis House, Topeka, Kansas, listed on the NRHP in Shawnee County, Kansas
- Elijah P. Curtis House, Metropolis, Illinois, listed on the NRHP in Illinois
- Gen. Samuel R. Curtis House, Keokuk, Iowa, listed on the NRHP in Lee County, Iowa
- George M. Curtis House, Clinton, Iowa, listed on the NRHP in Clinton County, Iowa
- Hakins-Stone-Hagan-Curtis House, Kirksville, Kentucky, listed on the NRHP in Madison County, Kentucky
- Nathaniel C. & Frances Curtis, Jr., House, Orleans Parish, Louisiana, listed on the NRHP in Orleans Parish, Louisiana
- Curtis-Shipley Farmstead, Ellicott City, Maryland, listed on the NRHP in Maryland
- Paul Curtis House, Medford, Massachusetts, listed on the NRHP in Massachusetts
- Allen Crocker Curtis House-Pillar House, Newton, Massachusetts, listed on the NRHP in Massachusetts
- William Curtis House (Newton, Massachusetts), listed on the NRHP in Massachusetts
- Noah Curtis House, Quincy, Massachusetts, listed on the NRHP in Massachusetts
- Thomas Curtis House, Quincy, Massachusetts, listed on the NRHP in Massachusetts
- Uri B. Curtis House-Tasker L. Oddie House, Tonopah, Nevada, listed on the NRHP in Nevada
- Uri B. Curtis House, Tonopah, Nevada, listed on the NRHP in Nevada
- Drake-Curtis House, Cochecton, New York, listed on the NRHP in New York
- Curtis-Crumb Farm, Hilton, New York, listed on the NRHP in New York
- Thomas Bennett Curtis House, Starkey, New York, listed on the NRHP in New York
- William A. Curtis House, Raleigh, North Carolina, listed on the NRHP in Wake County, North Carolina
- Sawyer-Curtis House, Little Hocking, Ohio, listed on the NRHP in Washington County, Ohio
- Walter Curtis House, Little Hocking, Ohio, listed on the NRHP in Washington County, Ohio
- William D. Curtis House, Sandusky, Ohio, listed on the NRHP in Sandusky, Ohio
- Alice Ghormley Curtis House, Amarillo, Texas, listed on the NRHP in Potter County, Texas
- Miller-Curtis House, Belton, Texas, listed on the NRHP in Bell County, Texas
- Genevieve & Alexander Curtis House, Salt Lake City, Utah, listed on the NRHP in Salt Lake County, Utah
- David W. and Jane Curtis House, Fort Atkinson, Wisconsin, listed on the NRHP in Jefferson County, Wisconsin
- Curtis-Kittleson House, Madison, Wisconsin, listed on the NRHP on Dane County, Wisconsin

== See also ==
- Curtis Arboretum
- Curtis Building, Brockton, Massachusetts
- Curtiss House (disambiguation)
- William Curtis House (disambiguation)
