= William Curtis House =

William Curtis House may refer to:

in the United States

(by state)

- William E. Curtis House, Tampa, Florida, listed on the NRHP in Florida
- William Curtis House (Newton, Massachusetts), listed on the NRHP in Massachusetts
- William A. Curtis House, Raleigh, North Carolina, listed on the NRHP in Wake County, North Carolina
- William D. Curtis House, Sandusky, Ohio, listed on the NRHP in Sandusky, Ohio

== See also ==
- Curtis House (disambiguation)
