= Walter Curtis House =

Historic house in Ohio, United States

- U.S. National Register of Historic Places
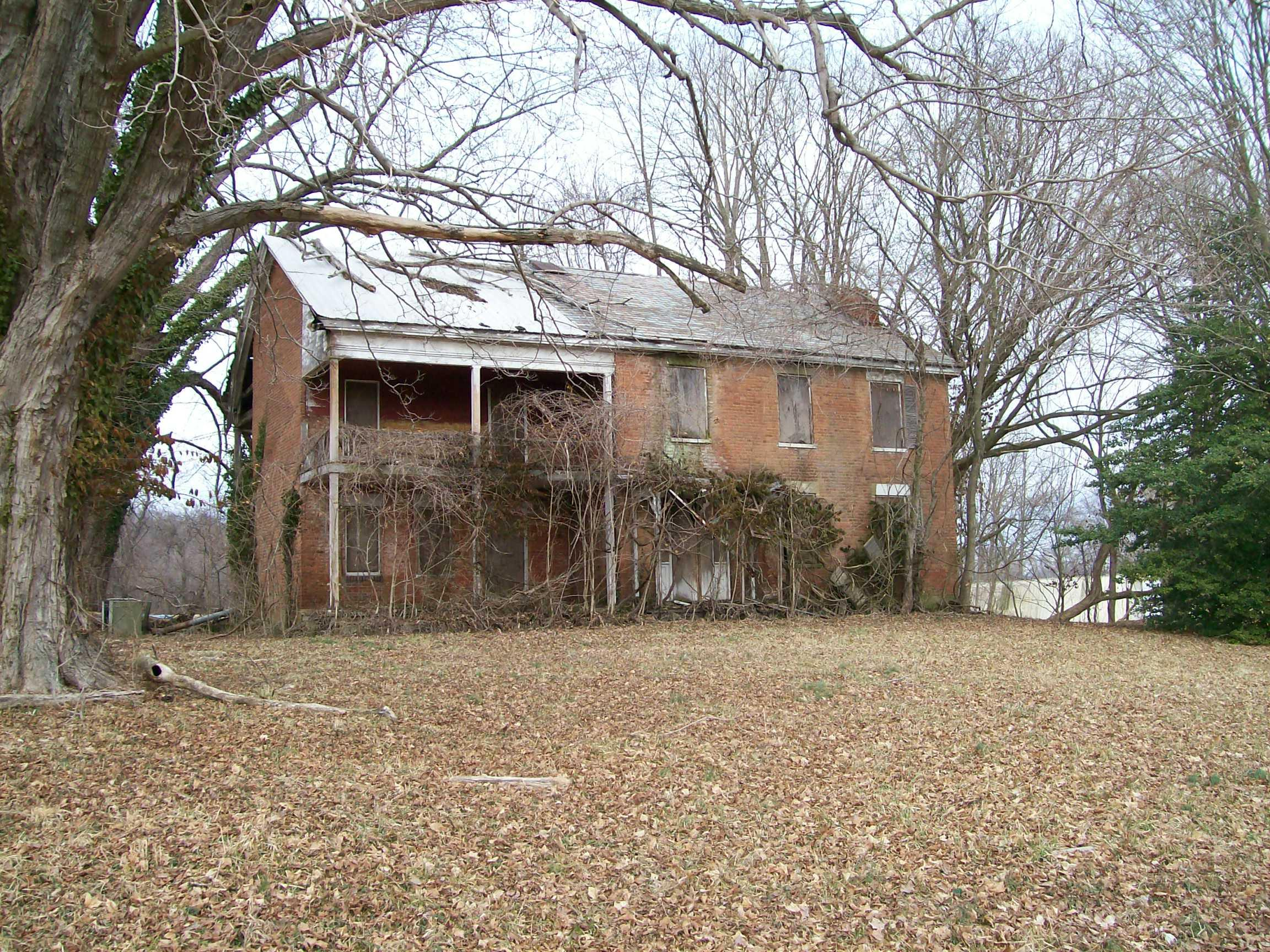
- Front of the house

- Location within Ohio Location within the United States
- Nearest city: Little Hocking, Ohio
- Coordinates: 39°13′17″N 81°42′39″W
- Area: less than 1 acre (0.40 ha)
- Built: 1827
- Architectural style: Greek Revival
- NRHP reference No.: 80003244
- Added to NRHP: October 3, 1980

The Walter Curtis House is a historic residence in far southern Washington County, Ohio, United States. Located south of Little Hocking, a community in southern Belpre Township, the house is a two-story structure constructed in 1827. Built of brick with elements of stone, it was the home of local politician Walter Curtis. During the nineteenth century, Curtis held such offices as Washington County Commissioner, associate judge, and Ohio state representative; his son Austin was later also elected to the Ohio House of Representatives.

== Earlier history ==
Born in 1787, Walter and his family moved to Ohio in 1791 from Warren, Connecticut. After the family lived in Marietta for a time, the end of the Northwest Indian War prompted them to establish a farm southwest of Marietta in 1795. On this land, which he had purchased from land speculators in the previous year, Walter's father Ebenezer constructed a substantial two-story log house, which was seen as superior to all other houses in the surrounding area at the time of its completion. Walter acquired the entire farm after his father's death, buying the property that had been left to the other heirs and purchasing adjacent land from other owners. Here, he constructed the present Greek Revival house from bricks laid in common bond with a gabled roof. As the years passed, Curtis established himself in local society, both as a legislator and as a leading participant in the commerce of the nearby Ohio River. Along with his brother Horace, he operated a business that transported freight by keelboat between river ports such as Pittsburgh, Pennsylvania, Charleston, Virginia, and Cincinnati, Ohio.

== Later history ==
Walter Curtis died in 1876; following his death, the farm passed into the hands of his descendants, who continued to own it into the 1920s. His family members changed their home very little; during the late twentieth century, architectural historians recognized it as one of southeastern Ohio's best examples of an early Greek Revival farmhouse. In 1980, the Walter Curtis House was listed on the National Register of Historic Places, qualifying because of its historically significant architecture and because of its place as the home of a leading local citizen. It is one of six Belpre Township sites to have received this designation: three houses and a bridge in the city of Belpre have also been so designated, as has the home of Walter's brother Horace in Little Hocking.
