= Curtiss House =

Curtiss House may refer to:

- Reuben Curtiss House, Southbury, Connecticut, listed on the National Register of Historic Places (NRHP) in New Haven County, Connecticut
- Glenn Curtiss House, Miami Springs, Florida, listed on the NRHP
- Lua Curtiss House I, Miami Springs, Florida, listed on the NRHP
- Lua Curtiss House II, Miami Springs, Florida, listed on the NRHP
- Charles G. Curtiss Sr. House, Plymouth, Michigan, listed on the NRHP

== See also ==
- Curtis House (disambiguation)
- Louis Curtiss Studio Building, Kansas City, Missouri, listed on the NRHP in Jackson County
- Harlow C. Curtiss Building, Buffalo, New York, listed on the NRHP
- Marcus Curtiss Inn, Galena, Ohio, listed on the NRHP in Delaware County
- Curtiss-Wright Hangar (disambiguation)
