= Belpre =

Belpre may refer to a place in the United States:

- Belpre, Kansas
- Belpre, Ohio
- Belpre Township, Edwards County, Kansas
- Belpre Township, Ohio
