= Belpre Township =

Belpre Township may refer to the following townships in the United States:

- Belpre Township, Edwards County, Kansas
- Belpre Township, Ohio
