= Curtiss-Wright Hangar =

Curtiss-Wright Hangar may refer to:

- Curtiss-Wright Hangars 1 and 2, Cahokia, Illinois, listed on the NRHP in St. Clair County, Illinois
- Curtiss-Wright Hangar (Columbia, South Carolina), listed on the NRHP in Columbia, South Carolina
