= Curtis Paper Mill =

Factory in Delaware, US

Coordinates: 39°41′25.4″N 75°44′58.7″W

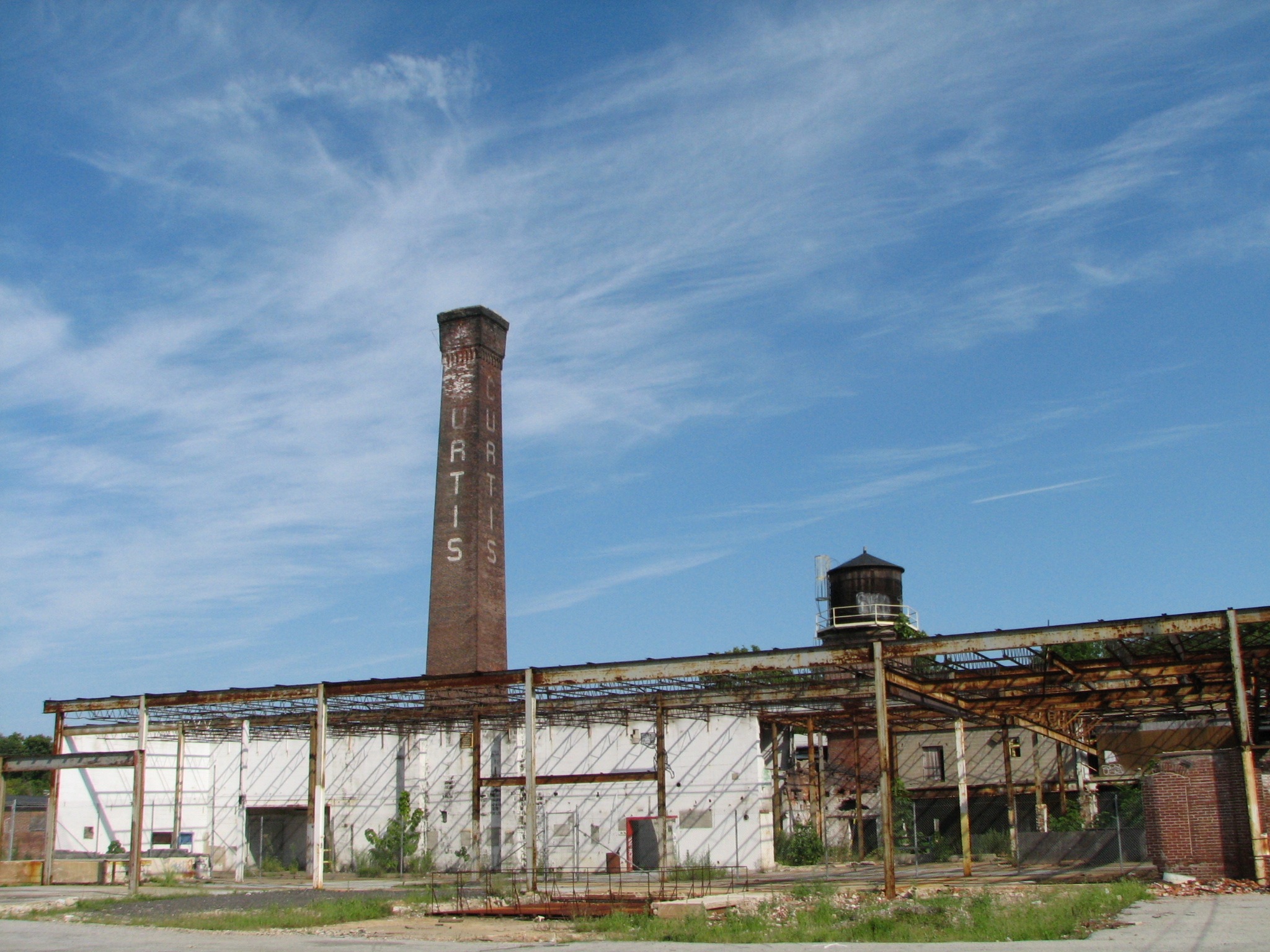
The mill seen from the south in 2006

The Curtis Paper Mill (also known as the Nonantum Mill) was a factory located near White Clay Creek in Newark, Delaware. Although a mill had existed on the site since the late eighteenth century, the final structure was built in 1870. The Curtis brothers bought the plant in 1848. Although the plant is usually referred to in Newark as the Curtis Paper Mill, the actual name is Nonantum Mill, referring to an Indian name for the area of Newton, Massachusetts, the Curtises' hometown.

The plant had the distinction of manufacturing the paper on which several of the peace treaties ending World War II were signed.

The James River Corporation eventually purchased the plant and subsequently sold it to Crown Vantage Corp. who closed it in 1997 as they consolidated their operations. It sat empty for several years and was eventually fenced off to prevent trespassing.

The main entrance to the plant and much of the front office were removed in 2002. In October 2007 demolition work began on the rest of the factory and was completed by December. The red brick smokestack bearing the 'Curtis' name was the only remaining structure from the mill until March 1, 2013 when it was demolished and removed. All of the original site buildings are now gone.

Today, the mill and adjacent land south to the creek are designated as a municipal park. The millrace path includes state park land and passes through the City of Newark's Coverdale Park. Small numbers of people hike along the millrace path or fish in the settling ponds.

Despite the closure of the facility, elements of the plant are still in use. The plant's settling ponds-originally used for cleaning waste water before returning it to White Clay Creek-were turned over to the City of Newark, which put them to use as part of a water treatment plant built nearby. Similarly, the plant's millrace (a long, thin canal that draws water from White Clay Creek) is now used to bring water to the treatment plant.

== See also ==
- Curtis Mansion
- Curtis Paper Mill Workers' Houses
