= Uri B. Curtis House–Tasker L. Oddie House =

Historic house in Nevada, United States

- U.S. National Register of Historic Places
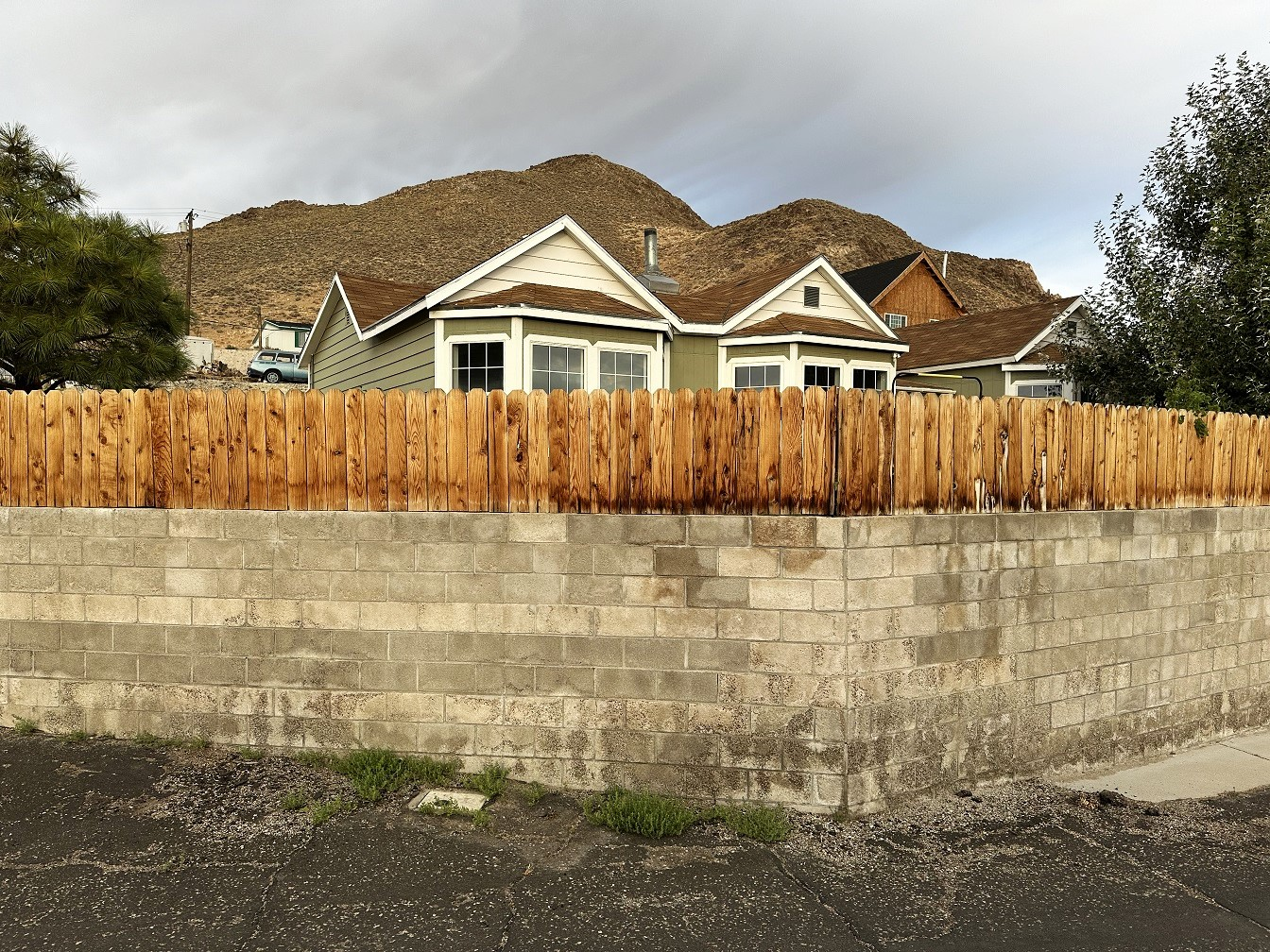
- Curtis-Oddie House in 2024

- Location within Nevada Location within the United States
- Location: Ellis St. Tonopah, Nevada
- Coordinates: 38.06523°N 117.23376°W
- Area: less than one acre
- Built: 1902
- MPS: Tonopah MRA
- NRHP reference No.: 82003228
- Added to NRHP: May 20, 1982

The Uri B. Curtis House–Tasker L. Oddie House, on Ellis St. in Tonopah, Nevada, United States, was built in 1902 and later enlarged. It is listed on the U.S. National Register of Historic Places. It was deemed significant for association with Tasker Lowndes Oddie, who was a lawyer and businessman and politician, eventually serving as governor of Nevada.

The house was partly built in the form of a pair of simple cabins by Uri B. Curtis, and was sold to Oddie in about 1904. Oddie enlarged it by adding more cabins at right angles. It was a modest residence that Oddie continued to reside in after becoming quite prominent. The house was listed on the National Register of Historic Places in 1982.

== See also ==
- Uri B. Curtis House, 169 Booker St., Tonopah, also NRHP-listed
