= Allen Crocker Curtis House–Pillar House =

Historic house in Massachusetts, United States

- Formerly listed on the U.S. National Register of Historic Places
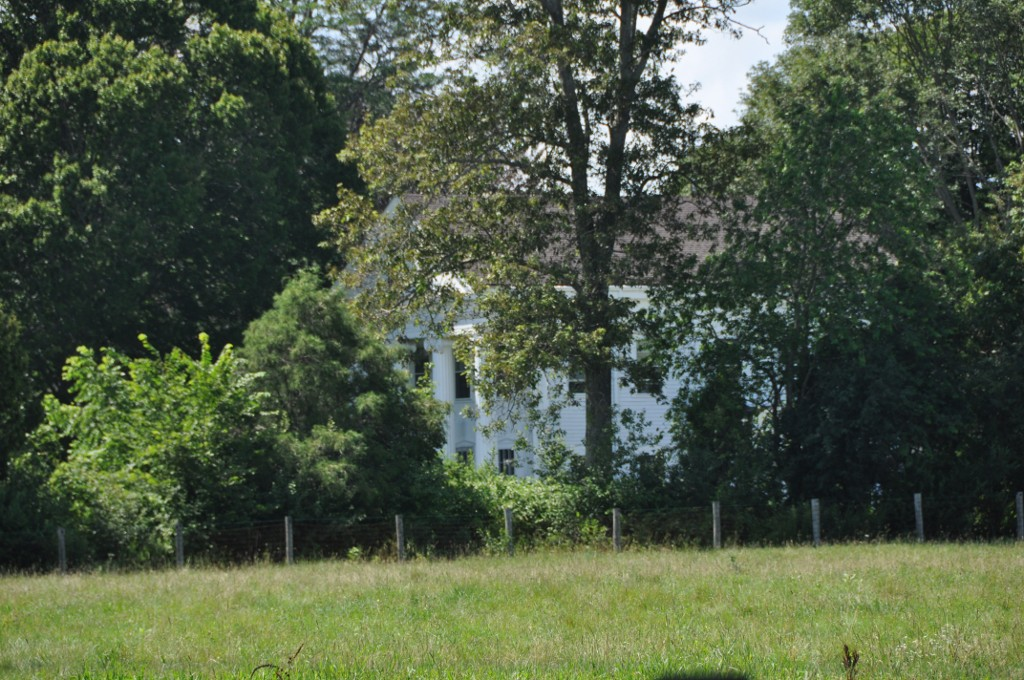

- Location within Massachusetts Location within the United States
- Location: originally 26 Quinobequin Rd., Newton, Massachusetts; now Old Sudbury Road, Lincoln, Massachusetts
- Coordinates: 42°24′4″N 71°19′58″W
- Built: 1845 (181 years ago)
- Architect: Lyon, William
- Architectural style: Greek Revival
- MPS: Newton MRA
- NRHP reference No.: 86001787

Significant dates
- Added to NRHP: September 04, 1986
- Removed from NRHP: February 8, 2024

The Pillar House is a house that was once located at 26 Quinobequin Road in Newton, Massachusetts, before being moved to its current location in Lincoln. It was built in 1845 and added to the National Register of Historic Places in 1986. It was removed from the National Register in 2024.

== History ==
Built about 1845, the house featured a Greek Revival portico. The house was home to a restaurant for many years, and was prominently visible from Interstate 95 in Newton. The property was taken by the state by eminent domain in 2003. The state sold the house for $1, provided the purchasers paid to move it. The house was deconstructed and rebuilt on Old Sudbury Road in Lincoln, Massachusetts, in 2005.

== See also ==
- National Register of Historic Places listings in Middlesex County, Massachusetts
