= Noah Curtis House =

Historic house in Massachusetts, United States

- U.S. National Register of Historic Places
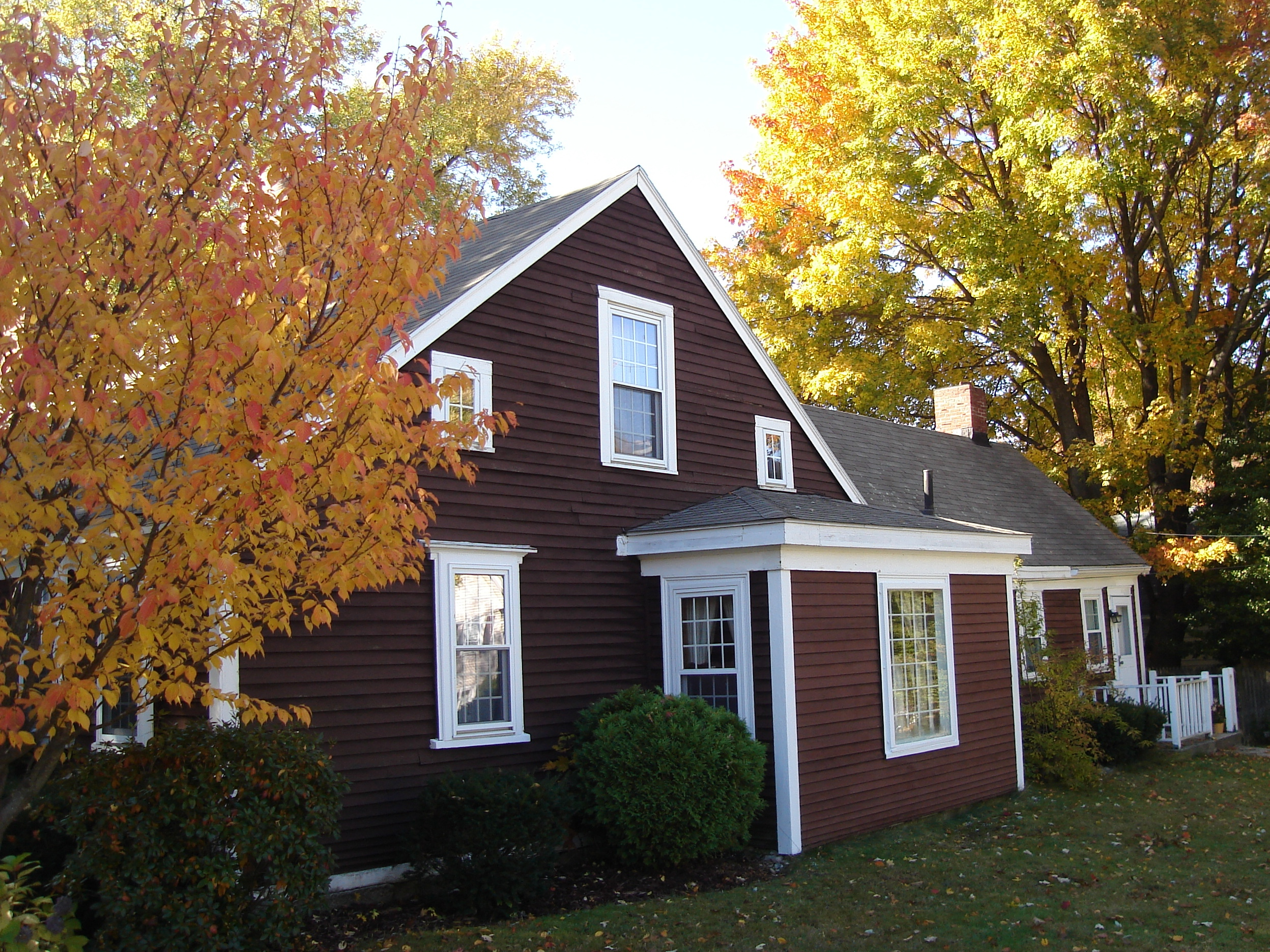

- Location within Massachusetts Location within the United States
- Location: 313 Franklin Street, Quincy, Massachusetts
- Coordinates: 42°14′2″N 71°0′1″W
- Built: 1795
- Architect: Noah Curtis
- Architectural style: Federal
- MPS: Quincy MRA
- NRHP reference No.: 89001335
- Added to NRHP: September 20, 1989

The Noah Curtis House is a historic house at 313 Franklin Street in Quincy, Massachusetts.

== Description and history ==
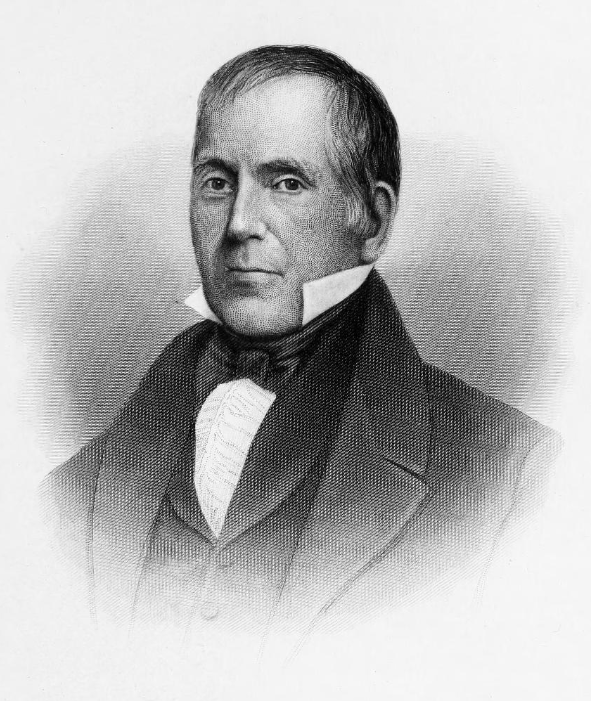
Noah Curtis (1772–1856)

The 1 1/2-story Federal period Cape style house, built in 1795 by Noah Curtis, is the oldest Cape-style house in South Quincy. Noah Curtis was an early local pioneer in manufacturing boots and shoes, which became one of Quincy's major industries.

The house is five bays wide, with a center entrance and a centrally-placed chimney. A later portico shelters the entry, adding the right side and rear.

The house was listed on the National Register of Historic Places on September 20, 1989.

== See also ==
- Thomas Curtis House, built nearby by his son
- National Register of Historic Places listings in Quincy, Massachusetts
