= Uri B. Curtis House =

Historic house in Nevada, United States

- U.S. National Register of Historic Places
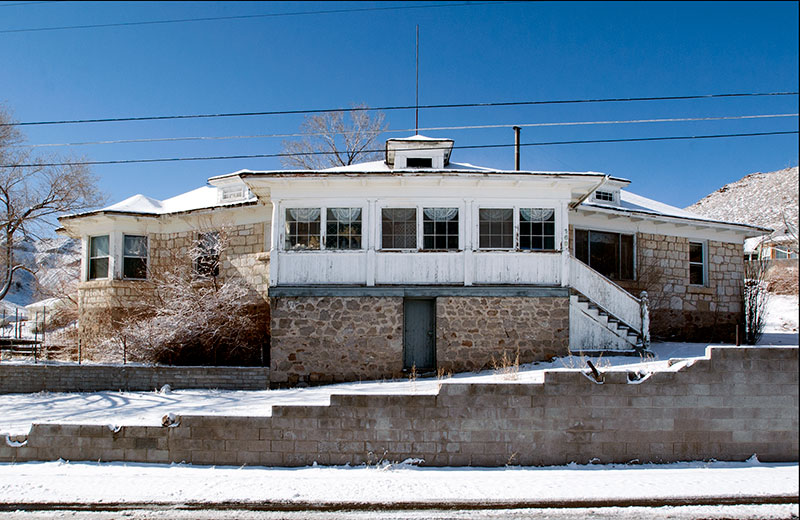

- Location within Nevada Location within the United States
- Location: 169 Booker St., Tonopah, Nevada
- Coordinates: 38.06534°N 117.23325°W
- Area: less than one acre
- Built: 1906
- MPS: Tonopah MRA
- NRHP reference No.: 82003227
- Added to NRHP: May 20, 1982

The Uri B. Curtis House, at 169 Booker St. in Tonopah, Nevada, United States, was built in 1906. It was listed on the National Register of Historic Places in 1982.

It was deemed significant for its association with businessman and mining investor Uri B. Curtis, who contributed to development of Tonopah by forming the Crystal Water Company that piped water to the growing town. The house is a large stone residence built in a U-shape in the University Heights neighborhood. It is uniquely designed.

== See also ==
- Uri B. Curtis House/Tasker L. Oddie House, Ellis St., Tonopah, also NRHP-listed
