= Curtis Paper Mill Workers' Houses =

Historic houses in Delaware, United States

- U.S. National Register of Historic Places
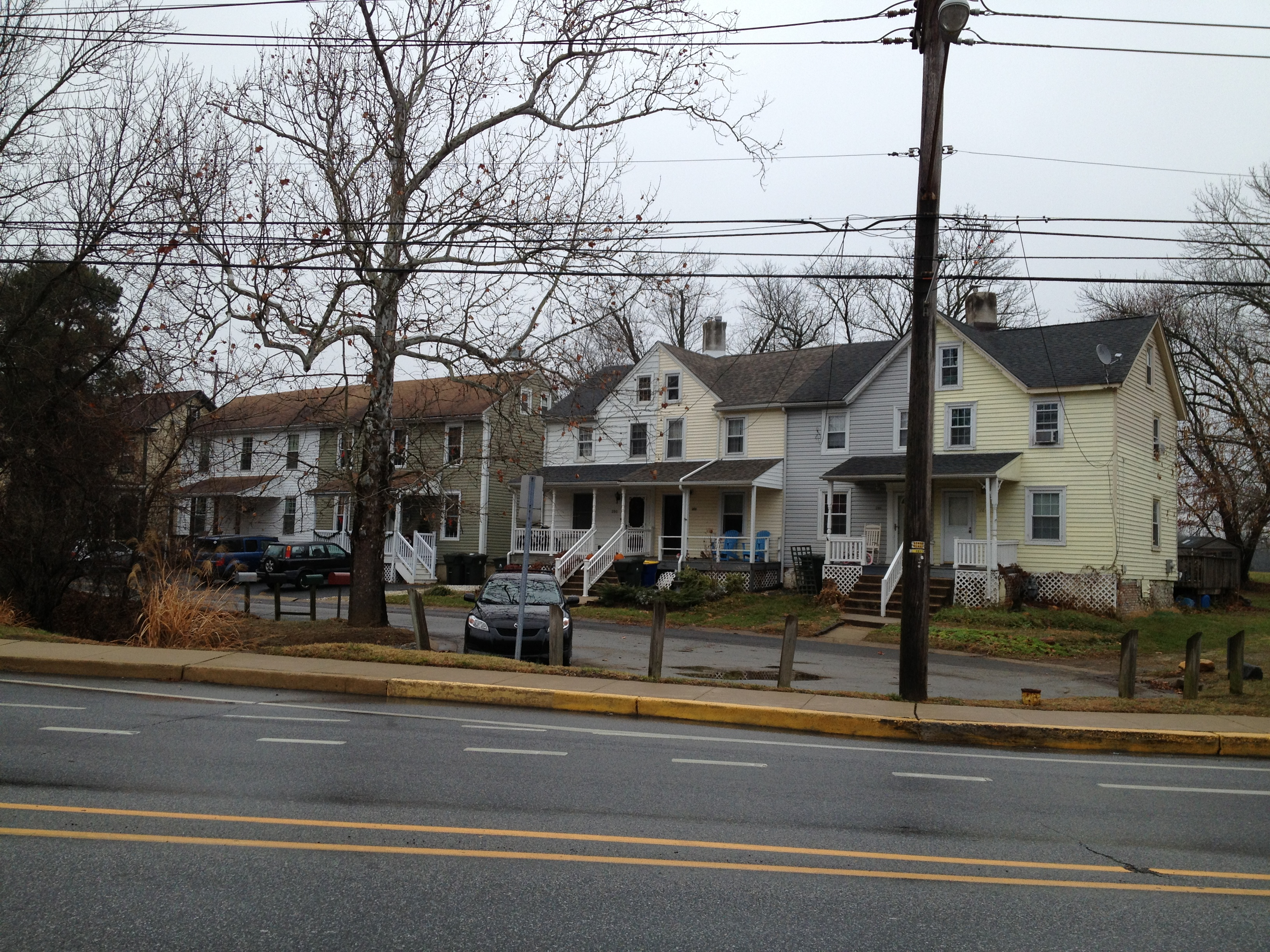

- Location within Delaware Location within the United States
- Location: Curtis Lane, Newark, Delaware
- Coordinates: 39°41′27″N 75°44′56″W
- Area: 0.7 acres (0.28 ha)
- Built: c. 1888
- MPS: Newark MRA
- NRHP reference No.: 82002340
- Added to NRHP: May 7, 1982

Curtis Paper Mill Workers' Houses is set of historic include single and two multi-family dwellings located at Newark in New Castle County, Delaware. They were built about 1888, and include two rectangular 2 1/2 story frame structures which served as multi-family worker's dwellings, and one 2 1/2 story, single family house which was used as the superintendents house. One building contains four family units, while the next building to the north houses two family units. They were built to house workers at the Curtis Paper Mill.

It was added to the National Register of Historic Places in 1982.

== See also ==
- National Register of Historic Places listings in Newark, Delaware
