= Curtiss-Wright Hangar (Columbia, South Carolina) =

- U.S. National Register of Historic Places
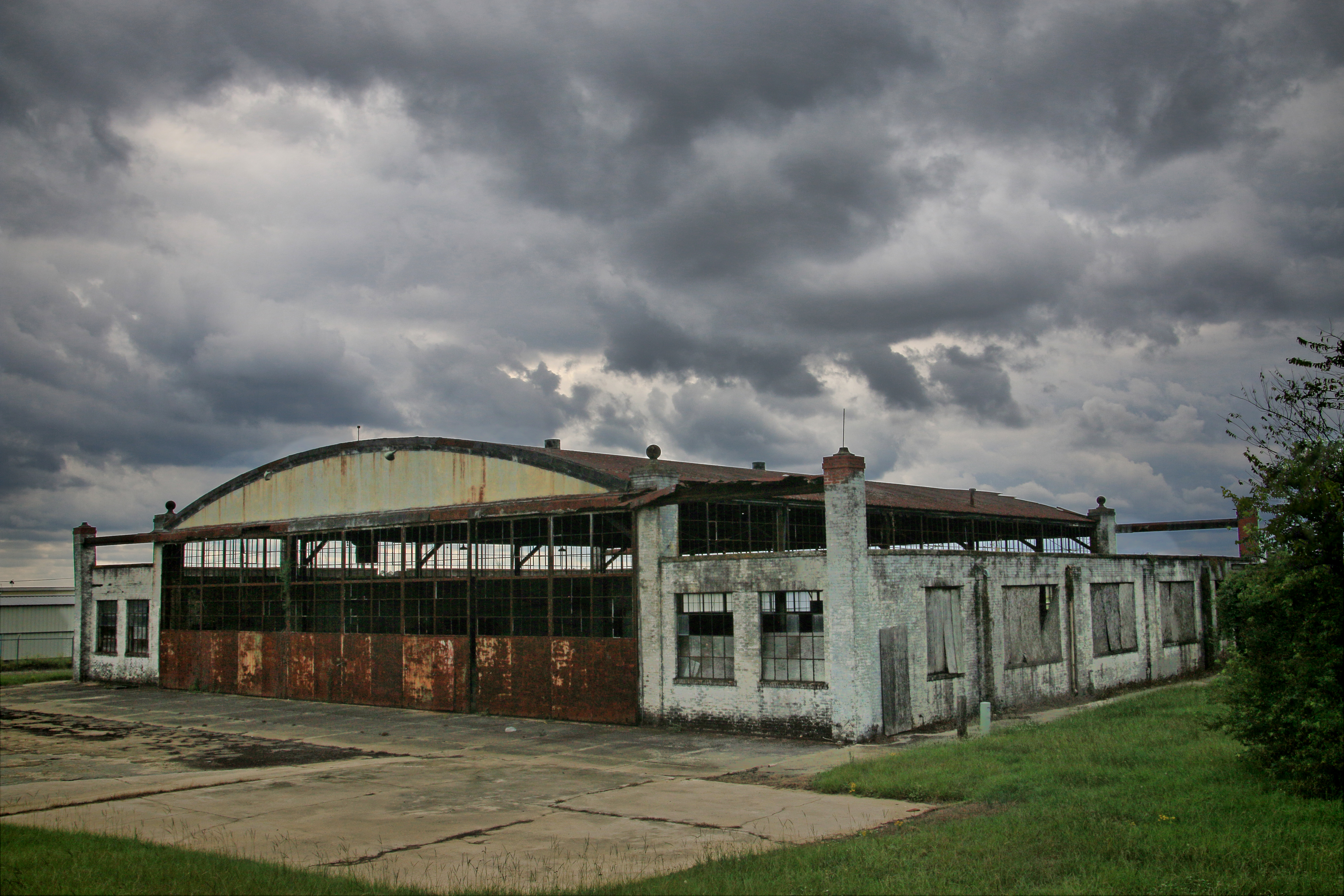

- Location within South Carolina Location within the United States
- Location: 1400 Jim Hamilton Blvd., Columbia, South Carolina
- Coordinates: 33°58′34″N 81°0′7″W
- Area: 1.5 acres (0.61 ha)
- Built: 1929
- Architect: Curtiss Flying Services
- Architectural style: Airplane hangar
- NRHP reference No.: 98000418
- Added to NRHP: April 30, 1998

The Curtiss-Wright Hangar, also known as Owens Field Municipal Airport Hangar, is an historic hangar located at Jim Hamilton – L.B. Owens Airport, Columbia, South Carolina. Built in 1929 by Curtiss-Wright, it consists of a central metal-clad barrel roofed storage area flanked on either side by flat-roofed wings.

It was added to the National Register of Historic Places in 1998.

In 2018, the restoration of the hangar was completed and the Hunter-Gatherer Brewery began serving a variety of craft beers and specialty foods.

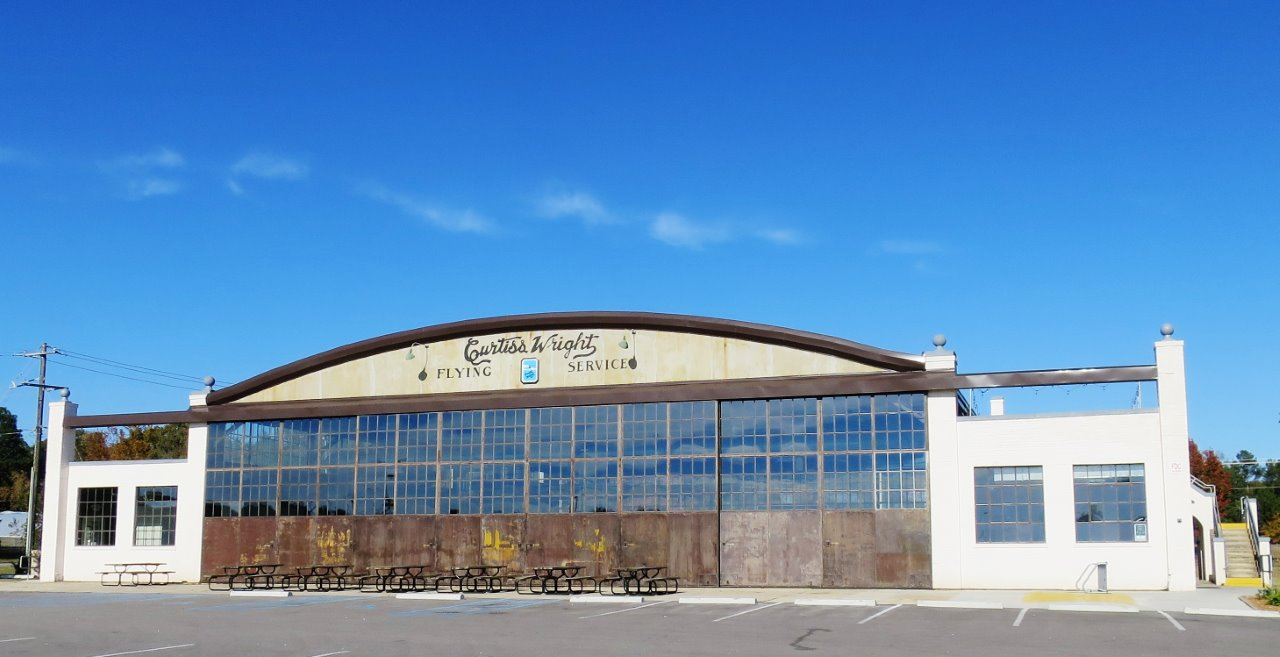
Curtiss Wright hangar was restored in 2018 and became a site for the Hunter-Gatherer Brewery.
