= Sawyer–Curtis House =

Historic house in Ohio, United States

- U.S. National Register of Historic Places
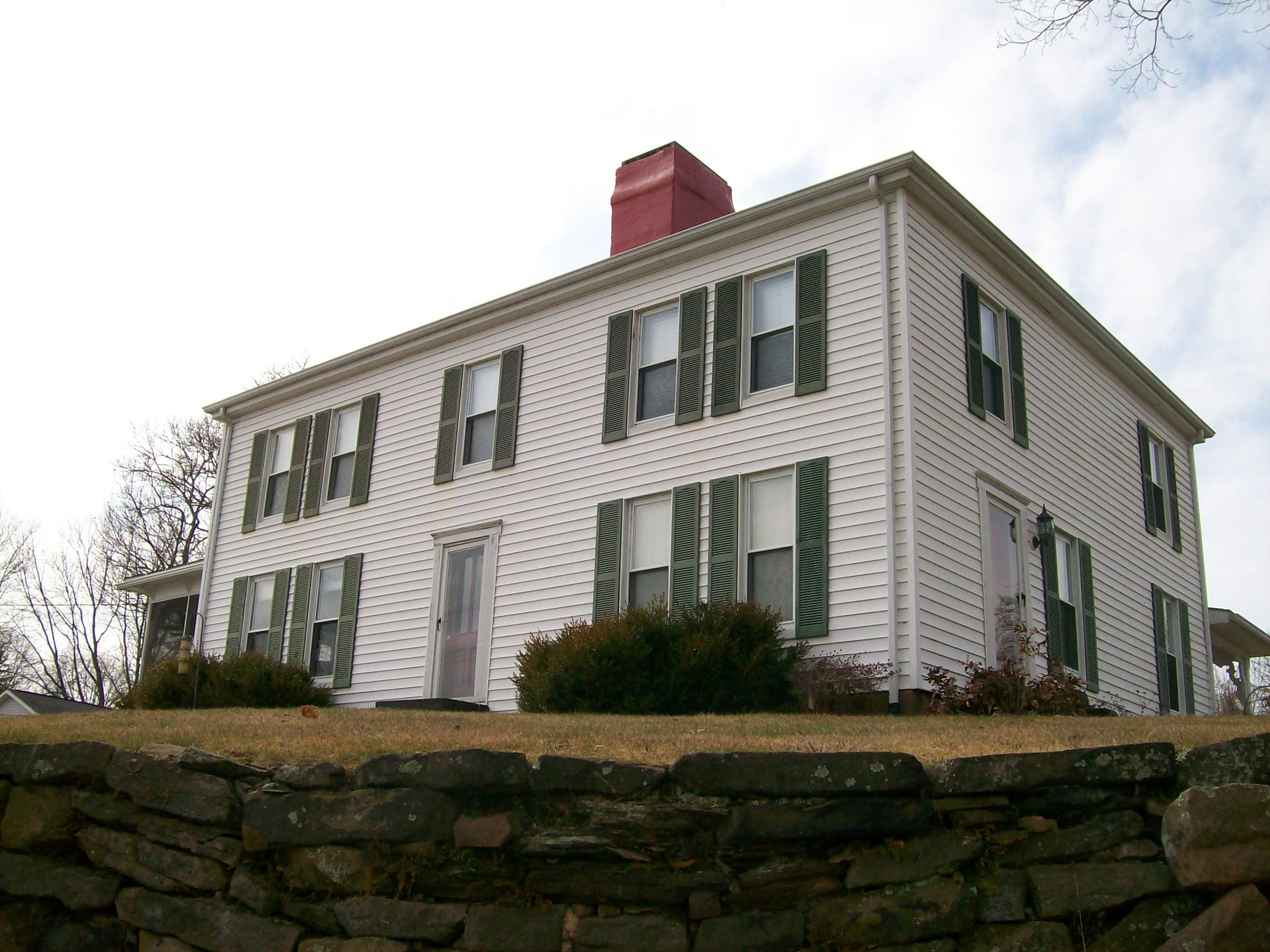
- Front of the house

- Location within Ohio Location within the United States
- Location: Off U.S. Route 50 in Little Hocking, Ohio
- Coordinates: 39°15′39″N 81°41′47″W
- Area: 1.8 acres (0.73 ha)
- Built: 1798
- NRHP reference No.: 84002696
- Added to NRHP: October 18, 1984

The Sawyer–Curtis House is a historic residence in the community of Little Hocking in Washington County, Ohio, United States. Located along the Ohio River in southern Belpre Township below the city of Belpre, Little Hocking was settled shortly before 1800. The earliest settler in the vicinity of Little Hocking was Nathaniel Sawyer, a native of Massachusetts who erected a New England–style of house there in 1798. Now known as the Sawyer–Curtis House, it is believed to have been the first permanent structure to be erected anywhere in Belpre Township. Sawyer's house is a weatherboarded structure with a tin roof and a foundation of sandstone. Built around a frame of logs, it is constructed with a typical New England floor plan, with its most significant individual feature being a massive chimney at the center of the house.

Besides serving as Sawyer's home, the house has served a range of purposes over the past two centuries. Among the other individuals who have lived there is its other namesake, Horace Curtis, who was one of the leading members of Washington County society in his day. Its uses have not been restricted to residential purposes: it has also been used as a post office and as a store, although it is currently used as a residence. In 1984, the house was listed on the National Register of Historic Places, along with one related building; it qualified for this designation because of its historically significant architecture and its place as the home of one of the area's leading citizens.
