= Gen. Samuel R. Curtis House =

Historic house in Iowa, United States

- U.S. National Register of Historic Places
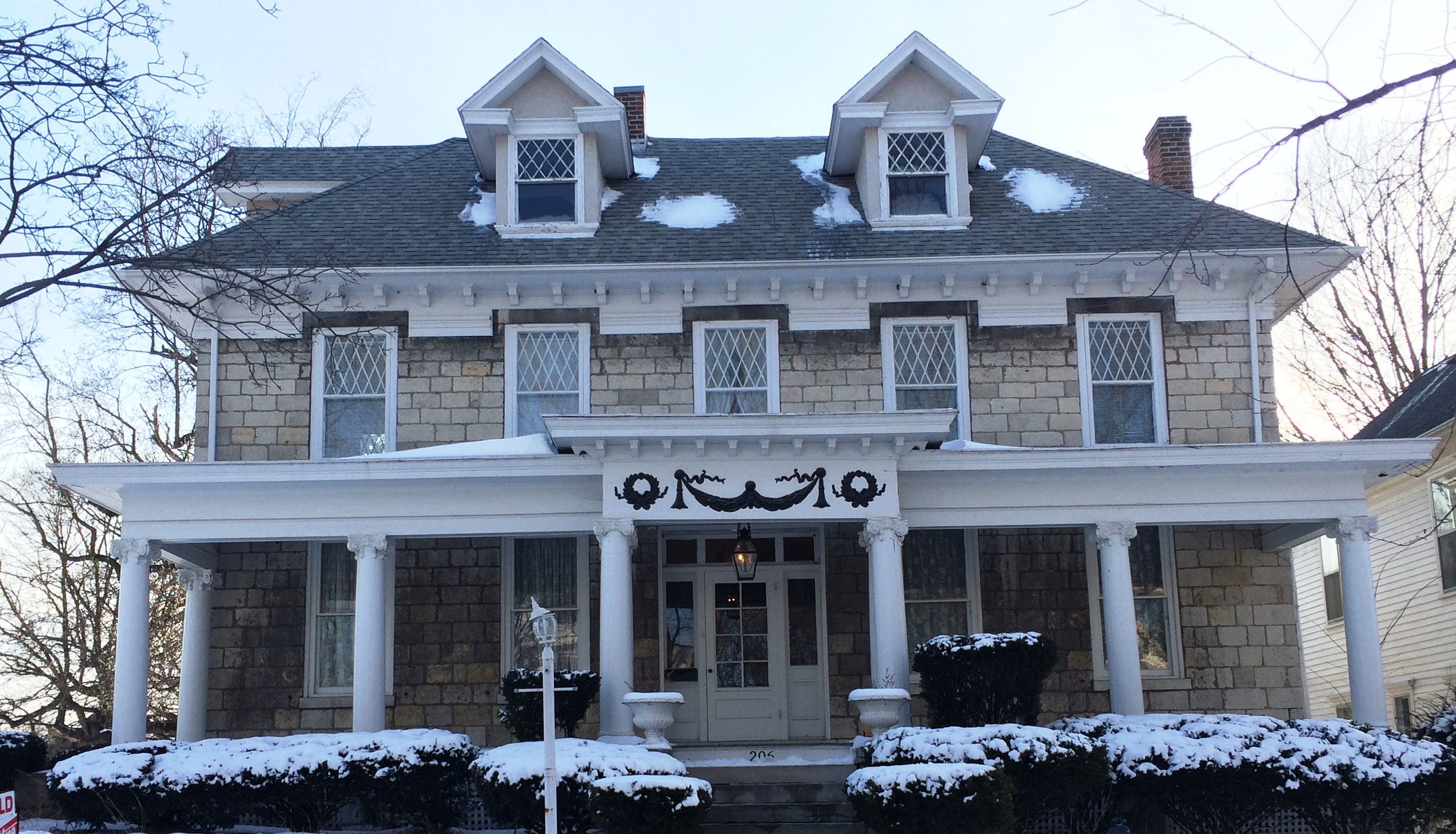
- Gen. Samuel R. Curtis House

- Location within Iowa Location within the United States
- Location: 206 High St. Keokuk, Iowa
- Coordinates: 40°23′43″N 91°22′42″W
- Area: less than one acre
- Built: C. 1848-1849
- Architectural style: Greek Revival
- NRHP reference No.: 98000384
- Added to NRHP: April 23, 1998

The Gen. Samuel R. Curtis House is a historic building located in Keokuk, Iowa, United States. Samuel R. Curtis was an engineer, congressman and served as mayor of Keokuk in the 1850s. He was the hero of the Battle of Pea Ridge during the American Civil War. Curtis was the first Major General from Iowa during the war. Curtis had this Greek Revival house built about 1849. The significance of the house is its association with Curtis, who died in 1866. It remained in the Curtis family until 1895 when it was sold. The house was listed on the National Register of Historic Places in 1998.

The house is a two-story rectangular limestone structure. When it was built it was L-shaped, but an 1857 renovation brought it to its current shape. It features a full-width front porch supported by Ionic columns and Adamesque details that was part of a later renovation. It has a walk-out basement in the back. In the back of the property is a two-story carriage house, which is not a part of the house's historic designation because it was built after Curtis' death.

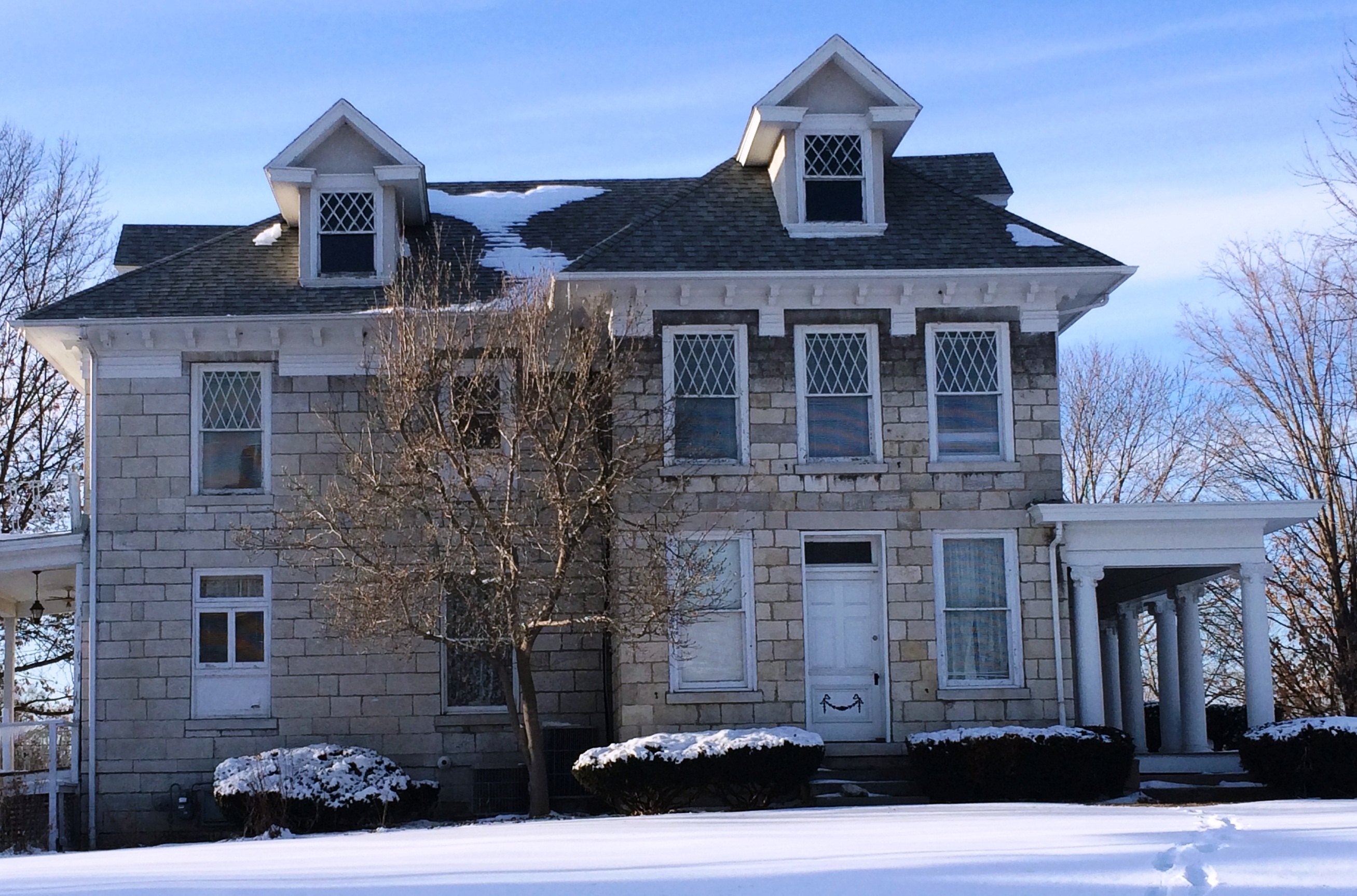
2nd Street View

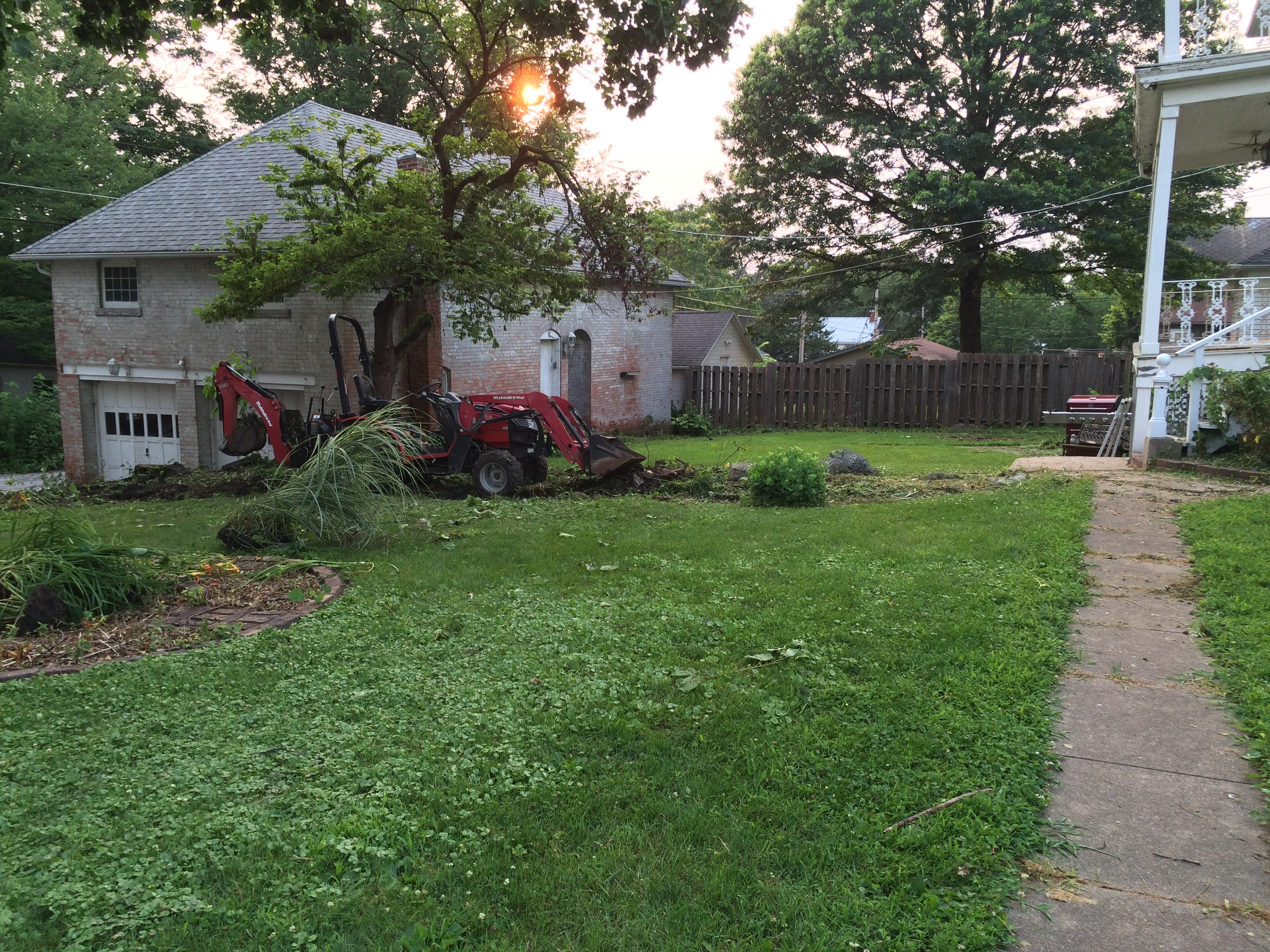
Coach house with garden

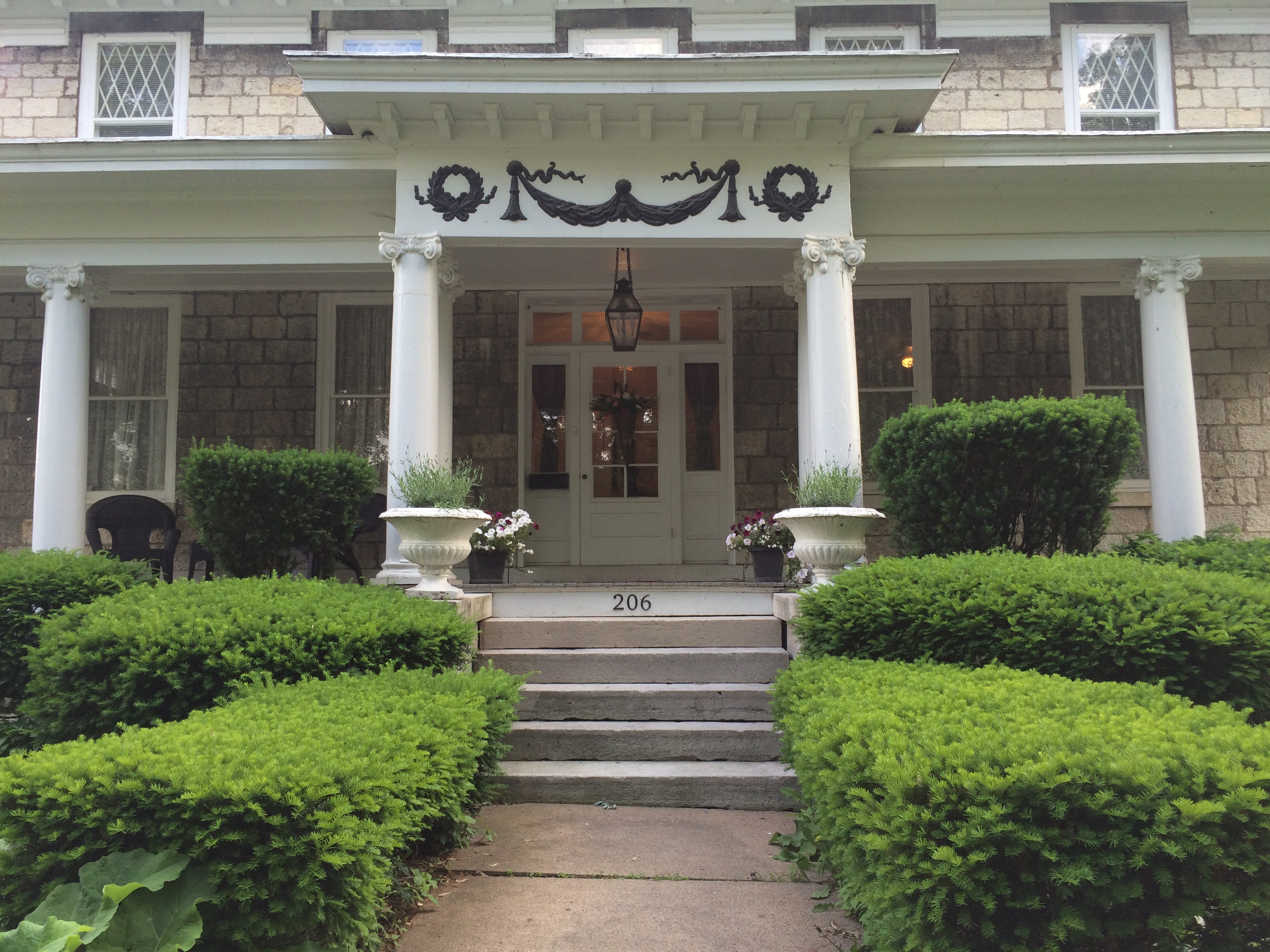
Front Porch

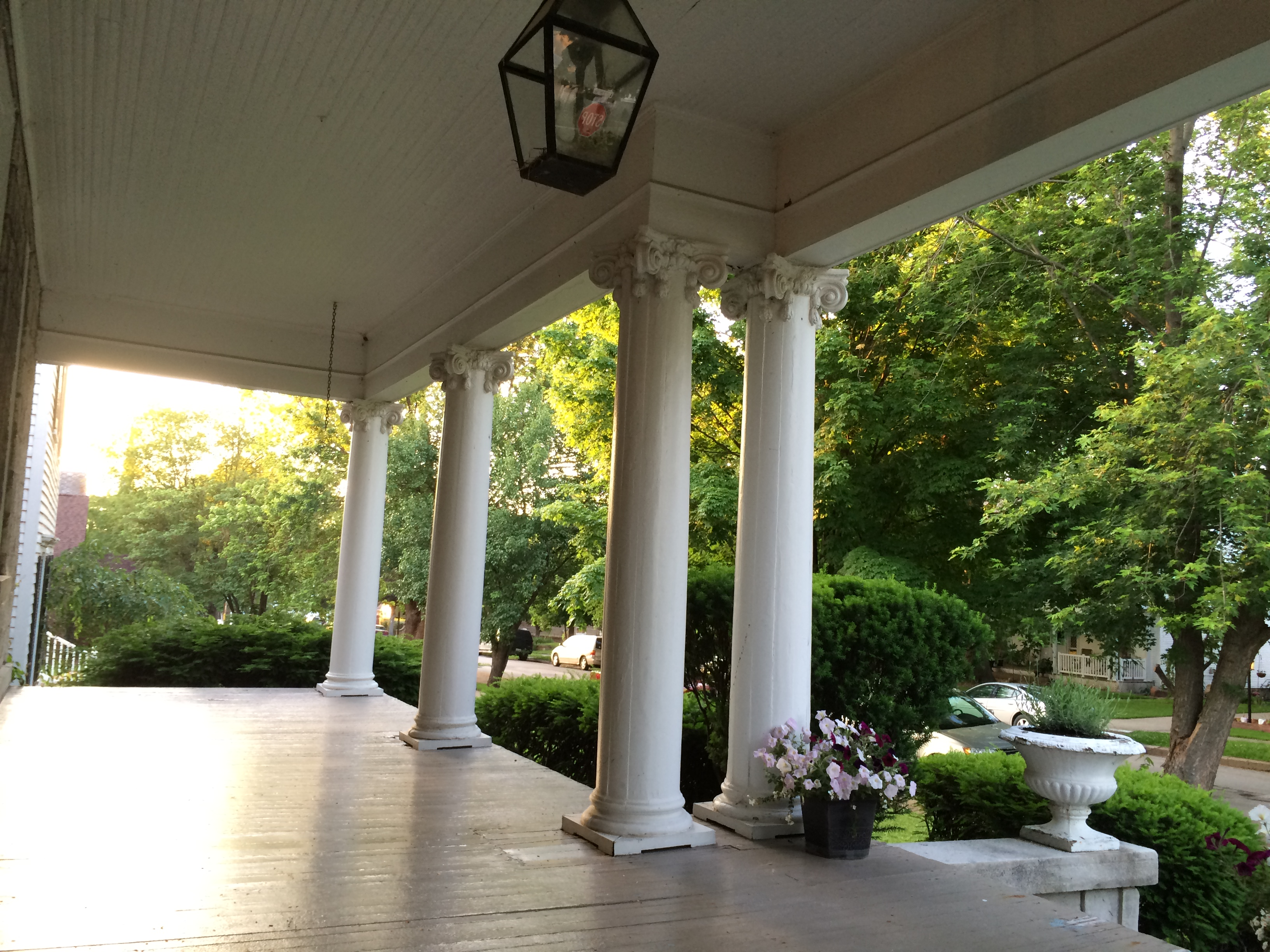
Front Porch view of High Street

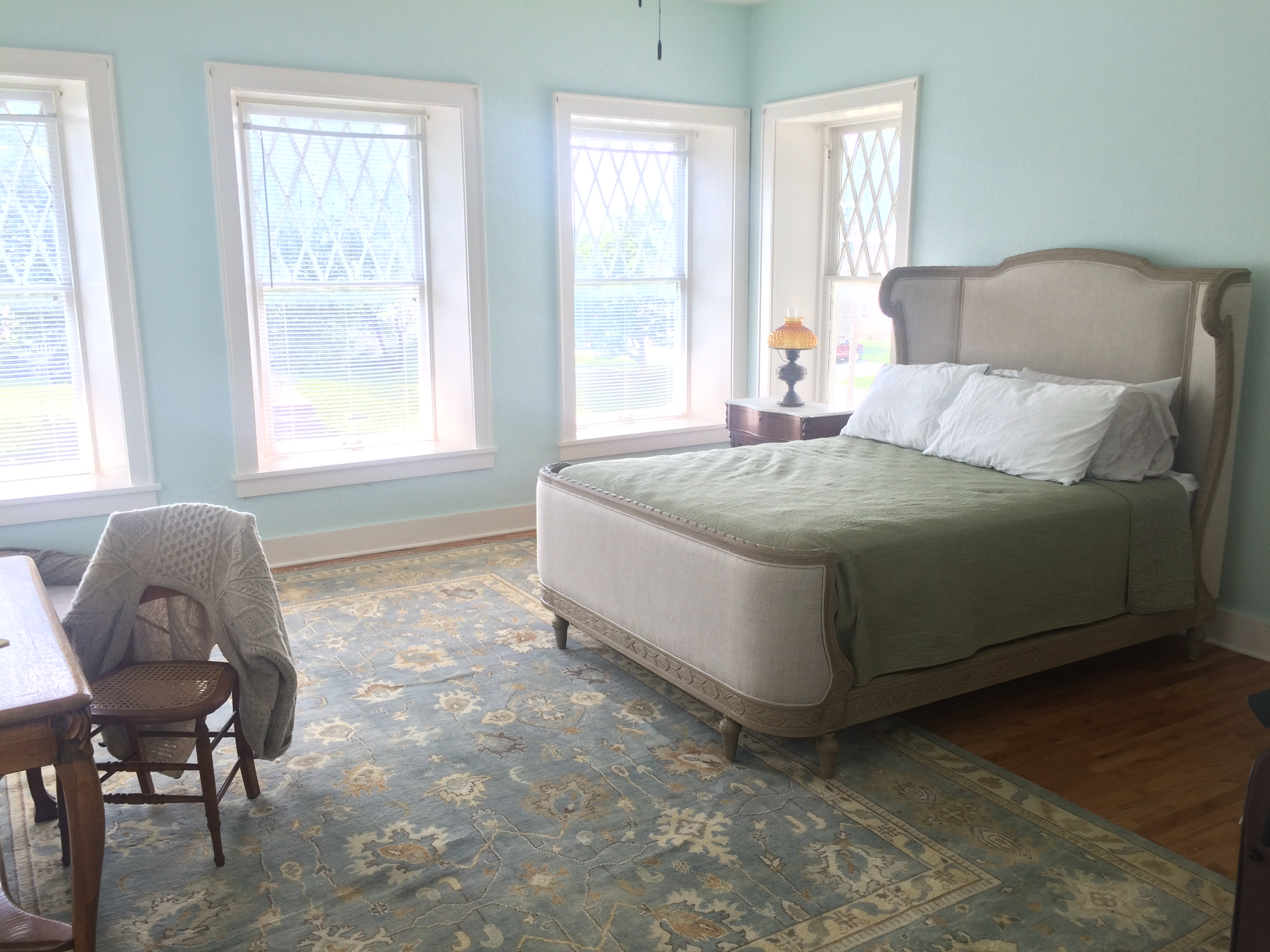
Master Bedroom

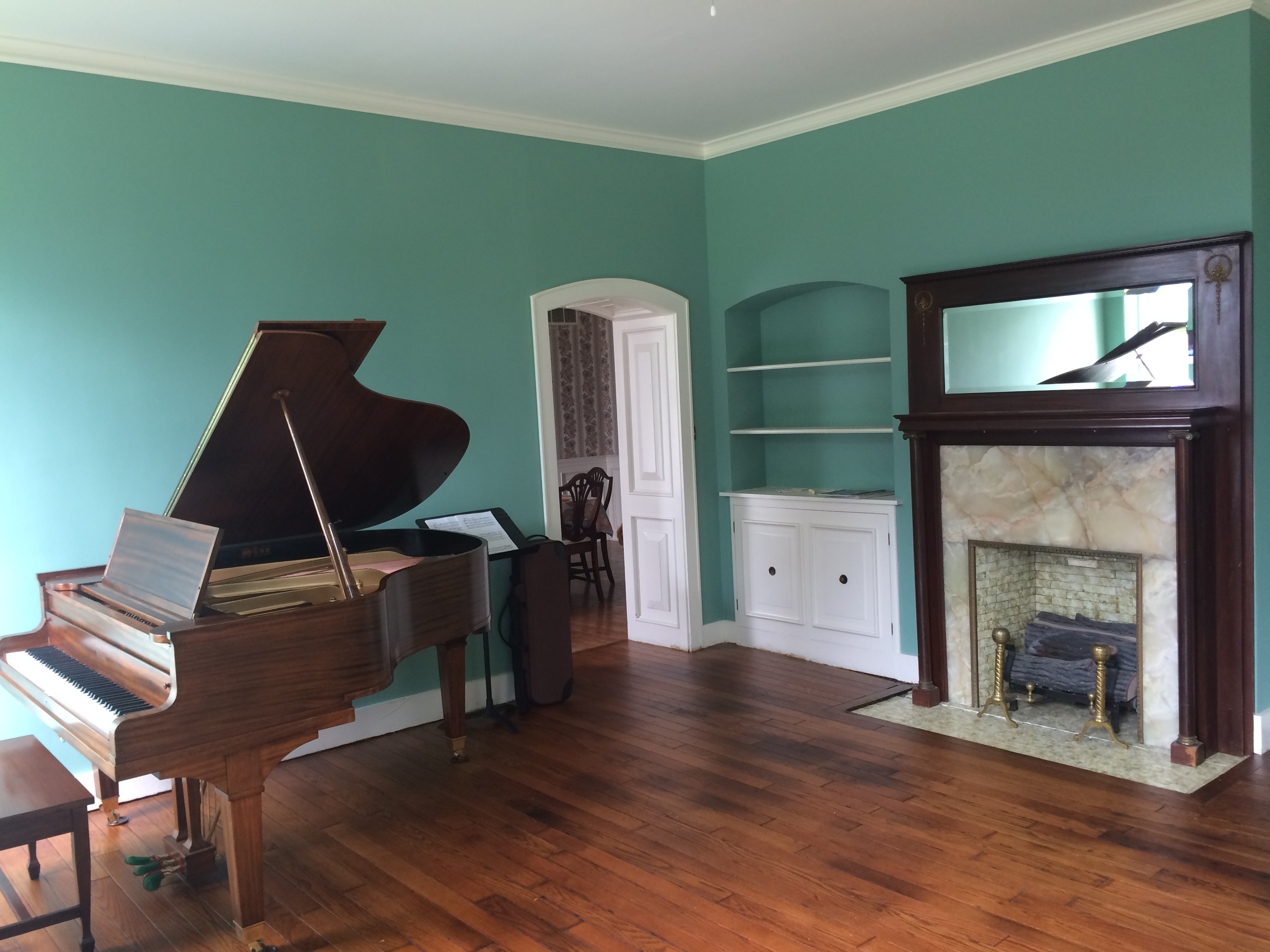
Music Room
