= Thomas Curtis House =

Historic house in Massachusetts, United States

- U.S. National Register of Historic Places
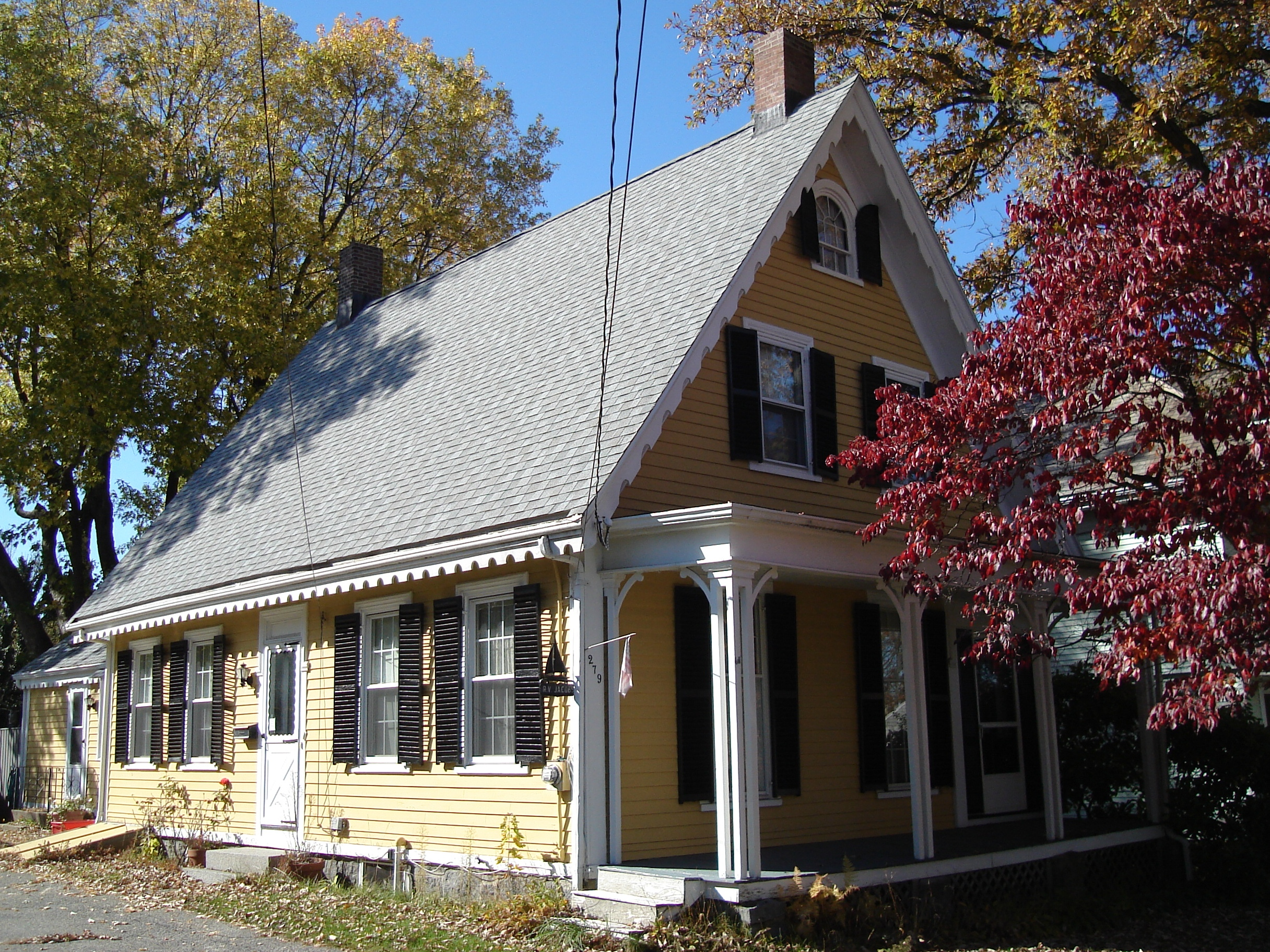

- Location within Massachusetts Location within the United States
- Location: 279 Franklin St., Quincy, Massachusetts
- Coordinates: 42°14′6″N 71°0′1.2″W
- Built: 1851
- Architectural style: Greek Revival
- MPS: Quincy MRA
- NRHP reference No.: 89001334
- Added to NRHP: September 20, 1989

The Thomas Curtis House is a historic house at 279 Franklin Street in Quincy, Massachusetts. The 1-3/4 story wood-frame cottage was built around 1851, and is a rare example of mid-18th century eclectic architecture, showing elements of Greek Revival, Italianate, and Gothic Revival styling. The house was built for Thomas Curtis, the owner of one of Quincy's larger shoe and boot manufacturers. He was the son of a local pioneer in the industry, Noah Curtis.

The house was listed on the National Register of Historic Places in 1989.

== See also ==
- Noah Curtis House
- National Register of Historic Places listings in Quincy, Massachusetts
