= Curtis Mansion =

Historic house in Delaware, United States

- U.S. National Register of Historic Places
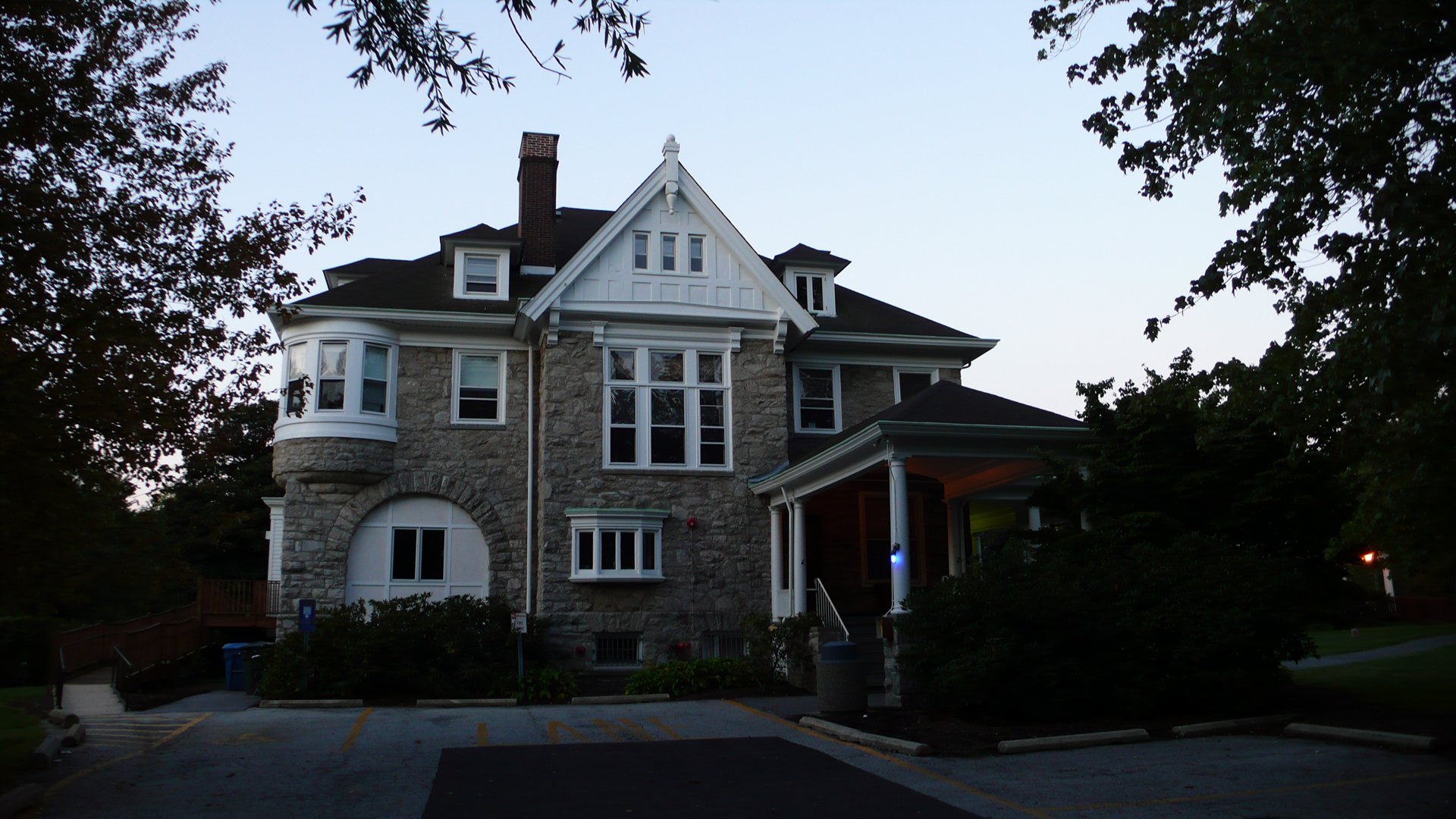
- Curtis Mansion, September 2012

- Location within Delaware Location within the United States
- Location: 183 W. Main St., Newark, Delaware
- Coordinates: 39.683895°N 75.760170°W
- Area: 5.2 acres (2.1 ha)
- Built: 1903
- Architectural style: Romanesque, Richardsonian Romanesque
- MPS: Newark MRA
- NRHP reference No.: 82002339
- Added to NRHP: May 7, 1982

Curtis Mansion is a historic home located at Newark in New Castle County, Delaware. It was built in 1903 and is a 2 1/2 story, rectangular stone residence in the Richardsonian Romanesque style. It has a five-bay facade, cross-gable roof, and northeast corner tower. The house features a wrap-around porch with Doric order column posts. It was built by Alfred A. Curtis, one of the three sons of F. D. Curtis, owner and operator of the Curtis Paper Mill. The house was purchased by the University of Delaware and initially served as a dormitory for French students. It was subsequently acquired in 1992 by the English Language Institute of the University of Delaware.

It was added to the National Register of Historic Places in 1982.

== See also ==
- National Register of Historic Places listings in Newark, Delaware
