= William E. Curtis House =

Historic house in Florida, United States

- U.S. National Register of Historic Places
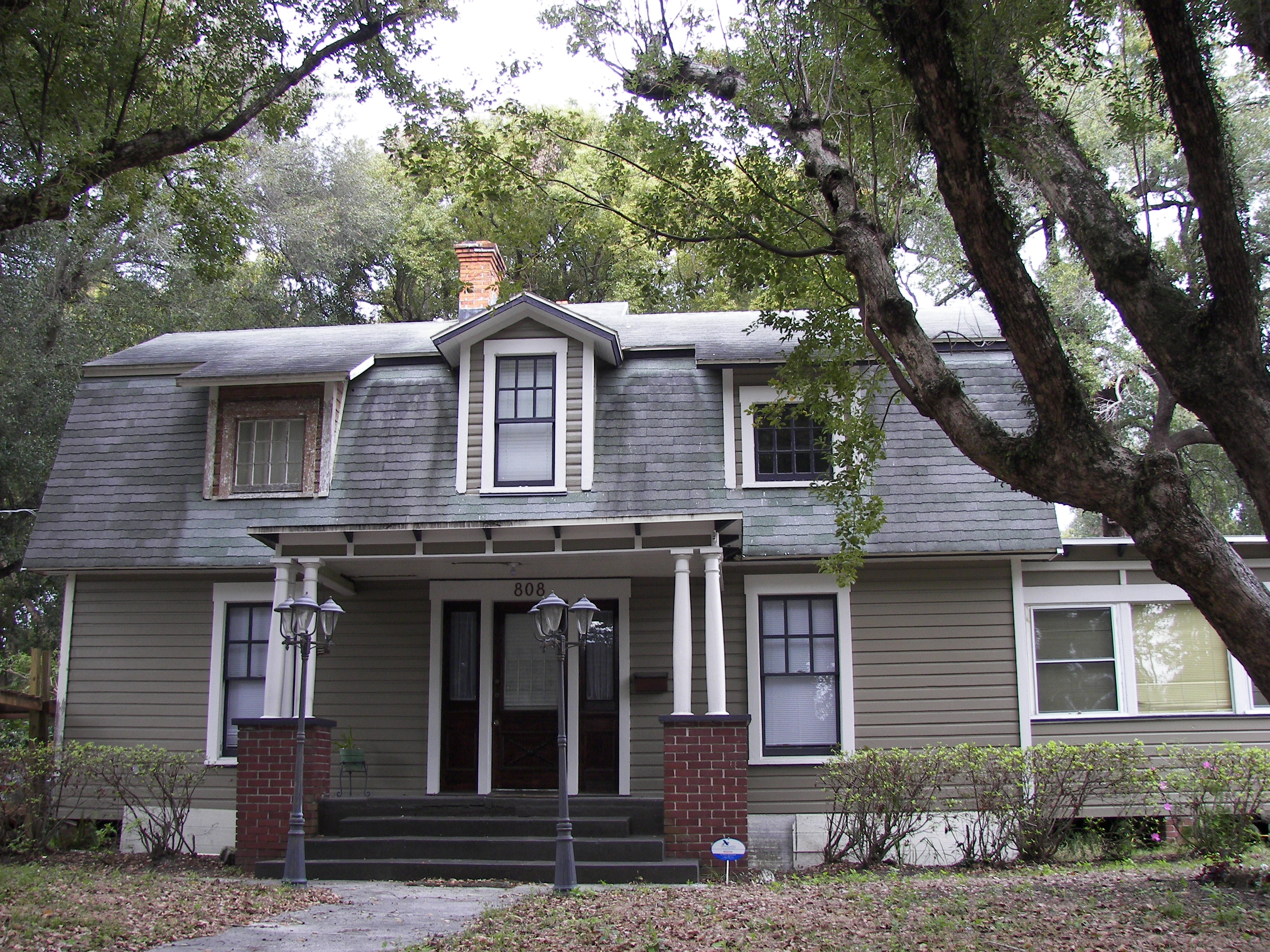

- Location within Florida Location within the United States
- Location: 808 East Curtis Street; Tampa, Florida
- Coordinates: 27°59′16″N 82°27′46″W
- Area: less than one acre
- Built: 1905 - 1906
- Architectural style: Dutch Colonial Revival
- NRHP reference No.: 87001424
- Added to NRHP: August 27, 1987

The William E. Curtis House (also known as the John F. Durack House) is a historic home in Tampa, Florida; located at 808 East Curtis Street. On August 27, 1987, it was added to the U.S. National Register of Historic Places. Curtis was a nurseryman

Built around 1905 - 1906, the house is one of the oldest residential structures in Tampa's Seminole Heights neighborhoods. The two-story, frame structure is an example of Dutch Colonial Revival style and features a gambrel roof.

As of 2025, it remains a private residence.

== Additional sources and external links ==
- Hillsborough County listings at National Register of Historic Places
- Florida's Office of Cultural and Historical Programs
  - Hillsborough County listings
