= Little Hocking, Ohio =

Census-designated place in Ohio, US

- CDP
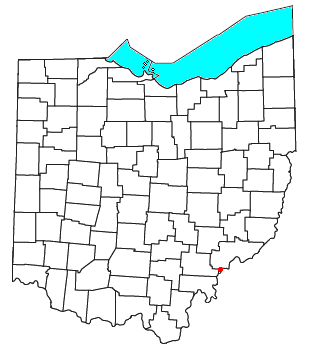
- Location of Little Hocking, Ohio
- Coordinates: 39°15′38″N 81°42′07″W
- Country: United States
- State: Ohio
- County: Washington
- Township: Belpre
- Elevation: 673 ft (205 m)

Population (2020)
  - Total: 244
- Time zone: UTC-5 (Eastern (EST))
  - Summer (DST): UTC-4 (EDT)
- ZIP code: 45742
- GNIS feature ID: 2628926

Little Hocking is a census-designated place in southern Belpre Township, Washington County, Ohio, United States. It has a post office with the ZIP code 45742. The population of the CDP was 244 at the 2020 census.

Little Hocking lies along the Ohio River south of Marietta. It sits at the intersection of U.S. Route 50 with State Route 124 and County Road 26, where the Little Hocking River meets the Ohio River.

== History ==
Little Hocking was platted in 1875, although a settlement had existed there for years prior. A post office has been in operation at Little Hocking since 1824. The community took its name from the nearby Little Hocking River.
