= William Curtis House (Newton, Massachusetts) =

Historic house in Massachusetts, United States

- U.S. National Register of Historic Places
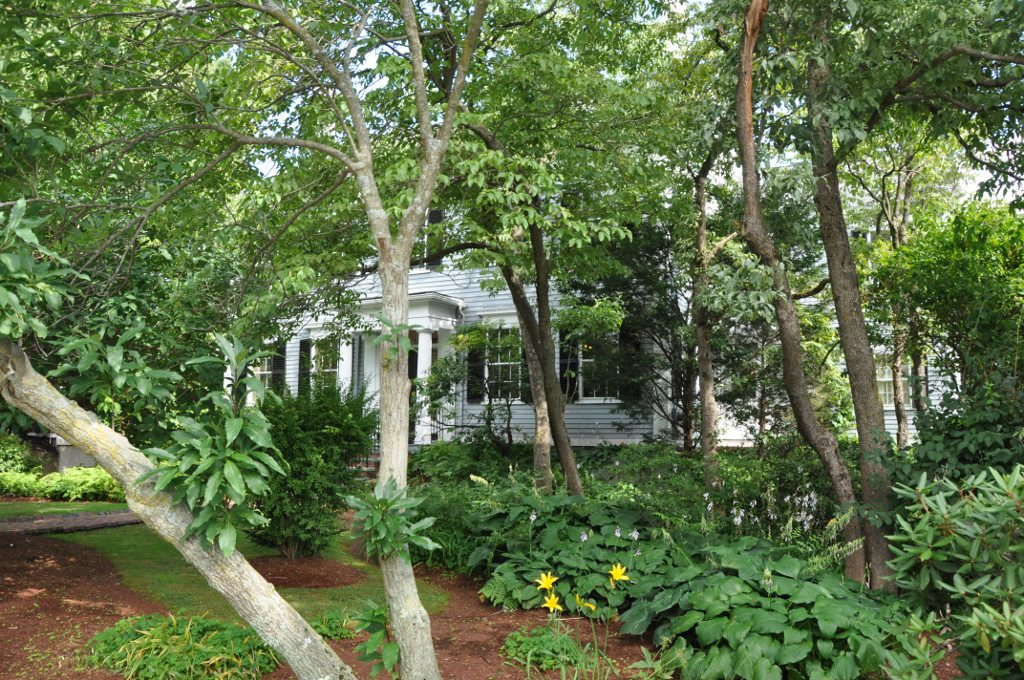

- Location within Massachusetts Location within the United States
- Location: 2330 Washington St., Newton, Massachusetts
- Coordinates: 42°19′31″N 71°15′27″W
- Built: 1839
- Architect: William Lyon
- Architectural style: Greek Revival
- MPS: Newton MRA
- NRHP reference No.: 86001788
- Added to NRHP: September 4, 1986

The William Curtis House is a historic house located at 2330 Washington Street in the Newton Lower Falls village of Newton, Massachusetts.

== Description and history ==
This 2 1/2-story wood-frame house was built in 1839 for William Curtis, and is an important local example of transitional Federal-Greek Revival styling. It has Federal massing, with a five bay front facade and four side chimneys, but it has Greek Revival corner pilasters, and a front entry sheltered by a Doric porch. William Curtis and his brother owned a local paper mill, which was the first in the area to install a Foudrinier machine, enabling the production of paper on rolls.

The house was listed on the National Register of Historic Places on September 4, 1986.

== See also ==
- National Register of Historic Places listings in Newton, Massachusetts
