= William A. Curtis House =

Historic house in North Carolina, United States

- U.S. National Register of Historic Places
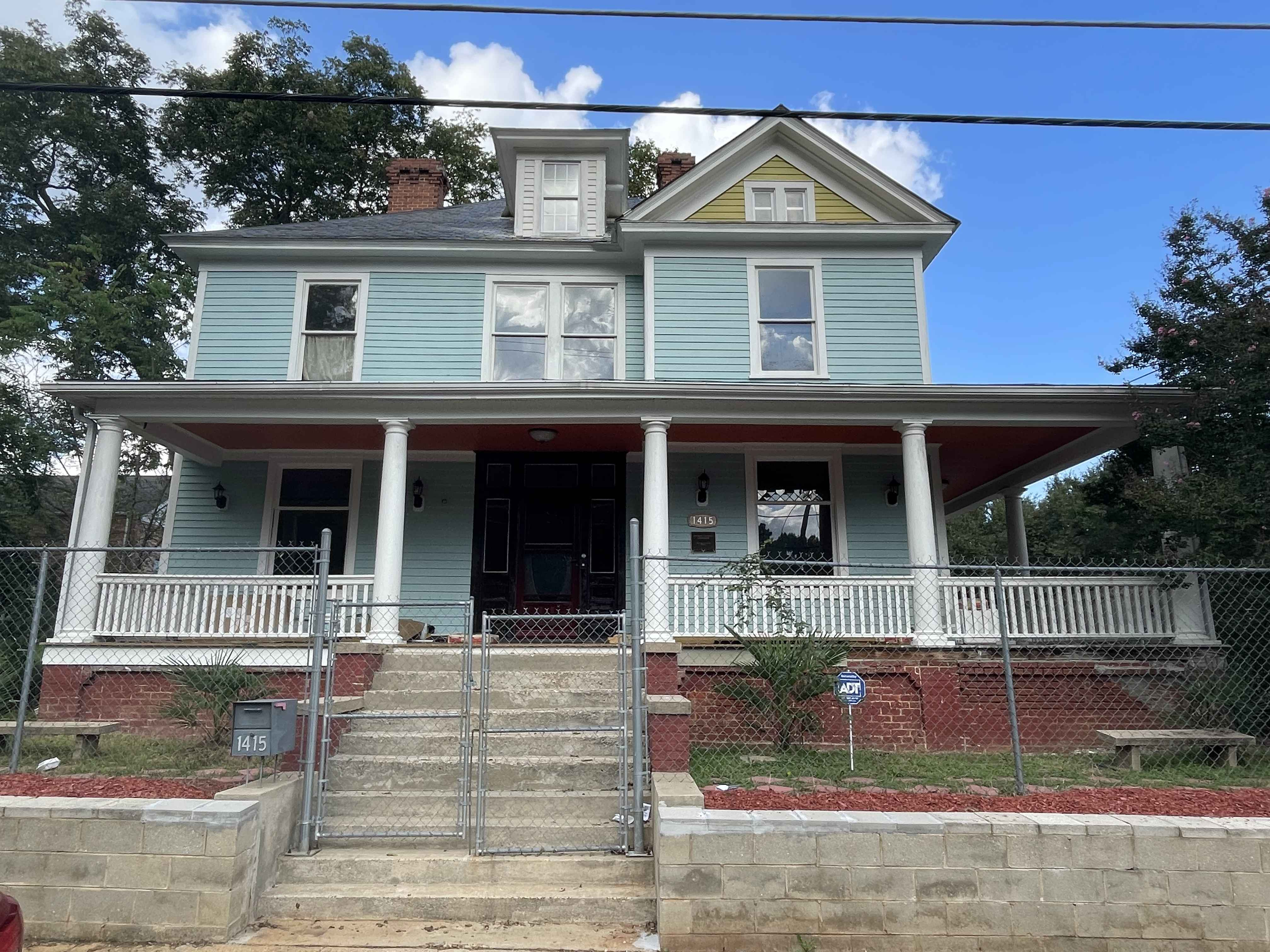

- Location within North Carolina Location within the United States
- Location: 1415 Poole Rd., Raleigh, North Carolina
- Coordinates: 35°46′44″N 78°37′0″W
- Area: less than one acre
- Built: 1915
- Architectural style: Late Victorian
- NRHP reference No.: 08000939
- Added to NRHP: September 24, 2008

William A. Curtis House, also known as Villa Florenza, is a historic home located at Raleigh, Wake County, North Carolina. It was built about 1915, and is a two-story, three bay wide, Late Victorian-style frame dwelling with a pyramidal roof. It has a full-height pedimented wing and one-story rear kitchen ell. It features a one-story wraparound porch. It was home to a prominent African-American family.

It was listed on the National Register of Historic Places in 2008.
