= Belpre Township, Ohio =

Township in Ohio, US

- Township
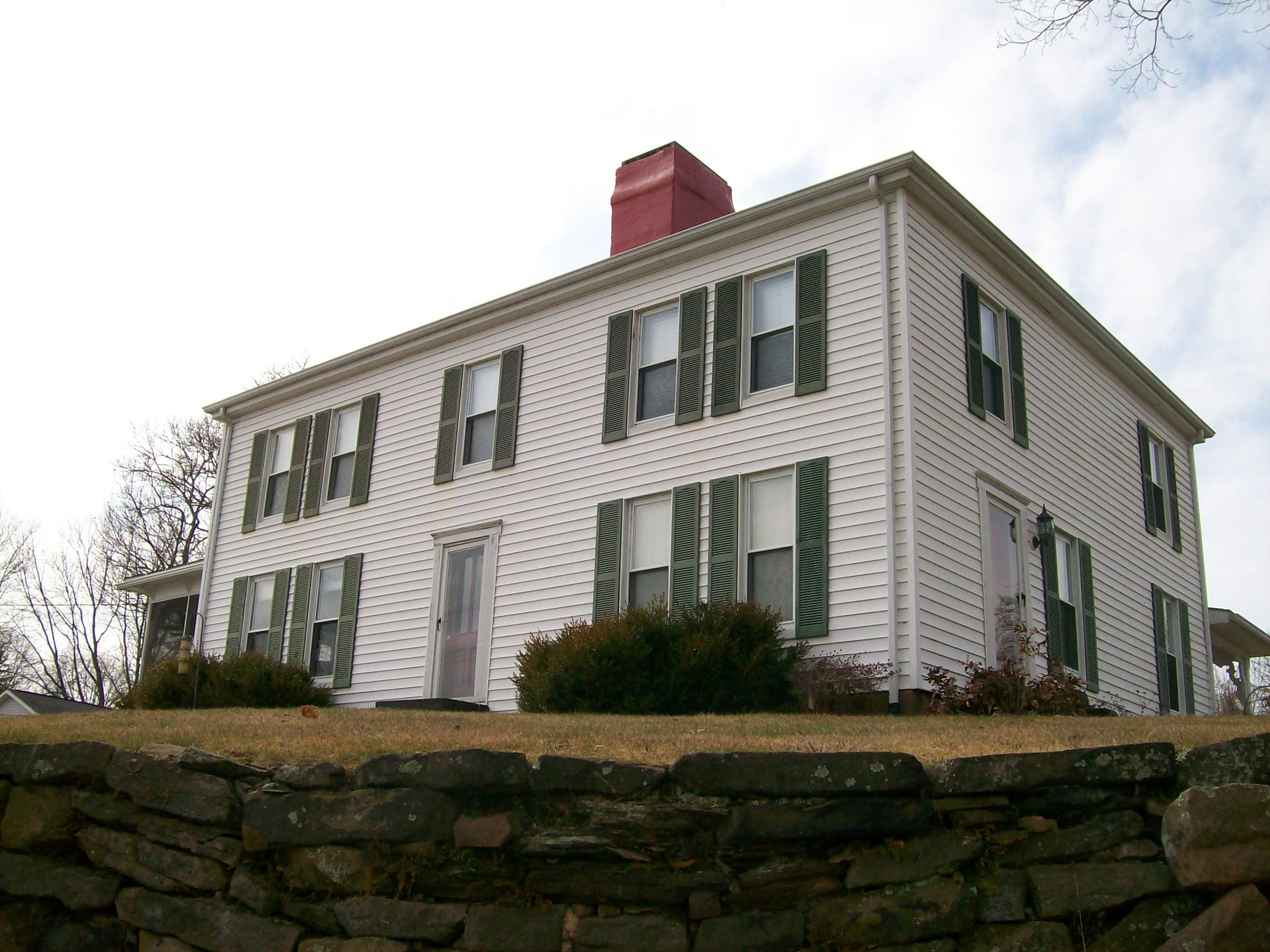
- The Sawyer-Curtis House in Little Hocking

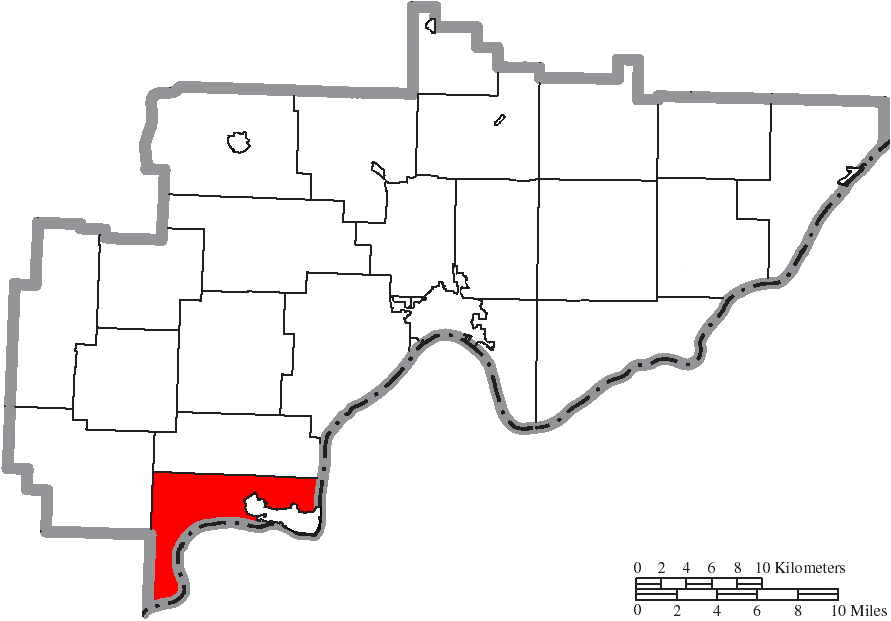
- Location of Belpre Township in Washington County
- Coordinates: 39°16′54″N 81°39′44″W
- Country: United States
- State: Ohio
- County: Washington

Area
  - Total: 24.1 sq mi (62.5 km^{2})
  - Land: 23.6 sq mi (61.2 km^{2})
  - Water: 0.46 sq mi (1.2 km^{2})
- Elevation: 735 ft (224 m)

Population (2020)
  - Total: 3,897
  - Density: 165/sq mi (63.7/km^{2})
- Time zone: UTC-5 (Eastern (EST))
  - Summer (DST): UTC-4 (EDT)
- ZIP code: 45714
- Area code: 740
- FIPS code: 39-05438
- GNIS feature ID: 1087128

Belpre Township is one of the twenty-two townships of Washington County, Ohio, United States. The 2020 census found 3,897 people in the township.

== Geography ==
Located in the southwestern part of the county along the Ohio River, it borders the following townships:

- Dunham Township - north
- Troy Township, Athens County - southwest
- Decatur Township - west

Wood County, West Virginia lies across the Ohio River to the southeast.

Two populated places are located in Belpre Township along the Ohio River: The city of Belpre, in the southeast; and the census-designated place of Little Hocking, in the southwest.

== Name and history ==
With a name derived from the French for "beautiful meadow", it is the only Belpre Township statewide.

== Government ==
The township is governed by a three-member board of trustees, who are elected in November of odd-numbered years to a four-year term beginning on the following January 1. Two are elected in the year after the presidential election and one is elected in the year before it. There is also an elected township fiscal officer, who serves a four-year term beginning on April 1 of the year after the election, which is held in November of the year before the presidential election. Vacancies in the fiscal officership or on the board of trustees are filled by the remaining trustees.
