= Charles Rice Ames House =

Historic house in Ohio, United States

- U.S. National Register of Historic Places
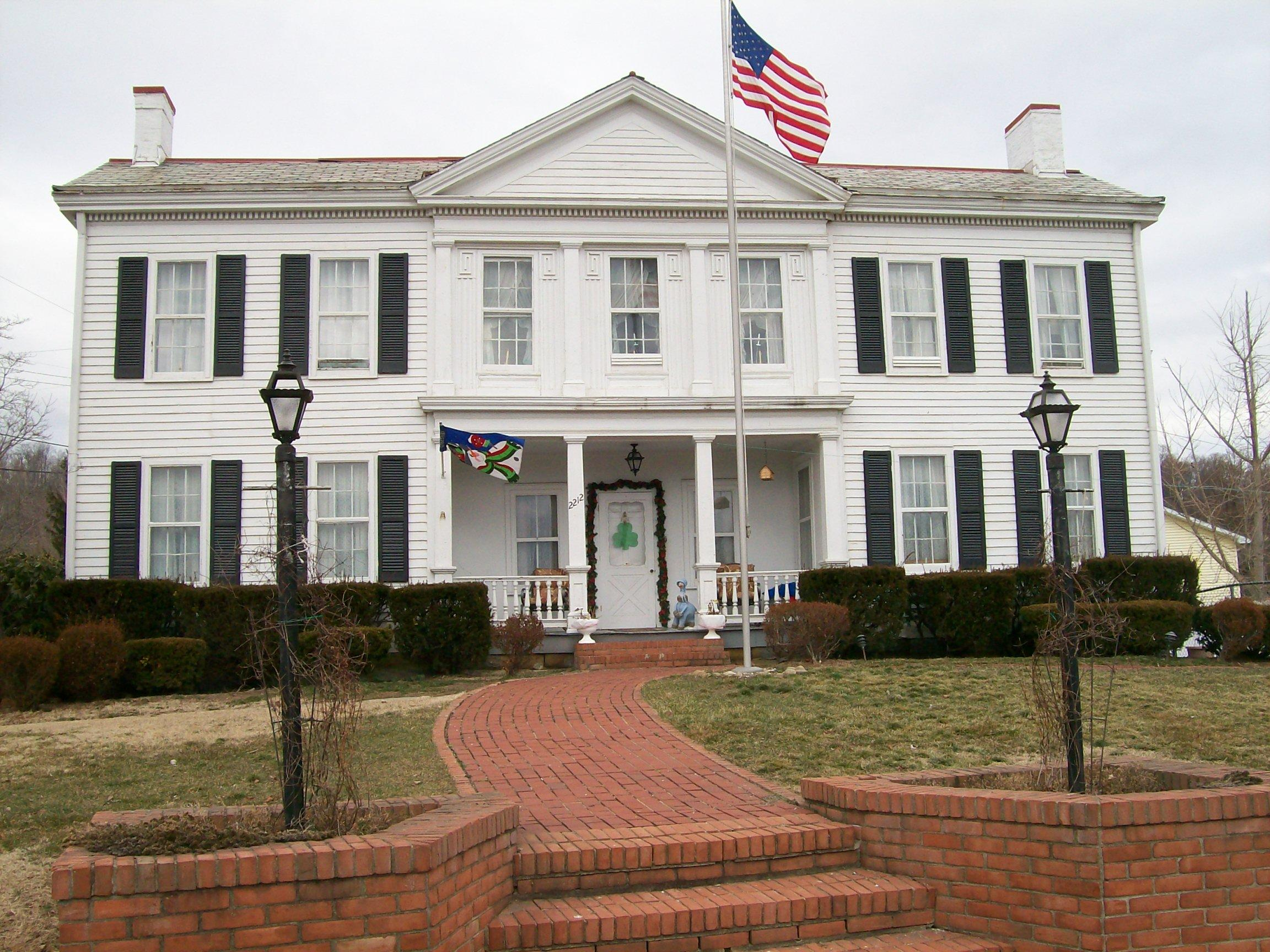
- Front of the house

- Location within Ohio Location within the United States
- Location: 2212 Miller Ave., Miller Subdivision, Belpre, Ohio
- Coordinates: 39°16′59″N 81°36′21″W
- Area: less than one acre
- Built: 1843
- Architect: Daniel Fischer
- Architectural style: Greek Revival
- NRHP reference No.: 78002208
- Added to NRHP: February 14, 1978

The Charles Rice Ames House is a historic residence in the city of Belpre, Ohio, United States. Built in 1843 in the Greek Revival style of architecture, the house has been named the region's most outstanding Greek Revival structure.

Charles Rice Ames contracted with local builder Daniel Fischer to construct his house in the 1840s. Fischer's design was a two-story structure, built on a foundation of sandstone, a slate roof, and frame walls. The floor plan of the residence is composed of a rectangular central section, plus wings on each side that project 15 feet (4.6 m) from the center. Among the distinctive architectural features of the house are pediments and gables on the facade. Years after serving as Ames' home, the house was owned by Roger and Carol Lynn Patton.

In 1978, the Ames House was listed on the National Register of Historic Places, qualifying for the Register because of its historic architecture, which was seen as significant throughout the local area. It is one of four Belpre locations on the Register, along with the Sixth Street Railroad Bridge, the Captain Jonathan Stone House, and Spencer's Landing.
