= Parkersburg Bridge =

Parkersburg Bridge may refer to:

- Parkersburg-Belpre Bridge
- Memorial Bridge (Parkersburg, West Virginia)
- Parkersburg Bridge (CSX)
