= Ohio State Route 32 =

State highway in southern Ohio, US

State Route 32
- James A. Rhodes Appalachian Highway
- Route of SR 32 in southern Ohio highlighted in red

Route information
- Maintained by ODOT
- Length: 182.71 mi (294.04 km)
- Existed: 1962–present

Major junctions
- West end: US 50 in Cincinnati
- I-275 in Union Township; US 68 in Mt. Orab; US 62 near Sardinia; SR 124 near Piketon; US 23 in Piketon; US 35 in Jackson; US 50 from Albany to Belpre; US 33 in Athens; SR 7 from Coolville to Belpre
- East end: WV 618 on Parkersburg-Belpre Bridge in Belpre

Location
- Country: United States
- State: Ohio
- Counties: Hamilton, Clermont, Brown, Highland, Adams, Pike, Jackson, Vinton, Meigs, Athens, Washington

Highway system
- Ohio State Highway System; Interstate; US; State; Scenic
← SR 31	→ US 33
← I-74	→ I-75

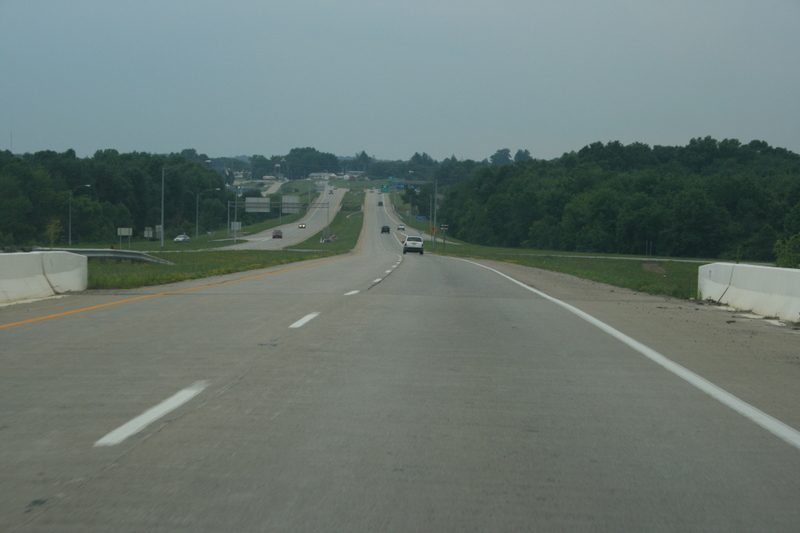
SR 32 crossing US 35 as SR 93 (background) crosses US 35 in Jackson County

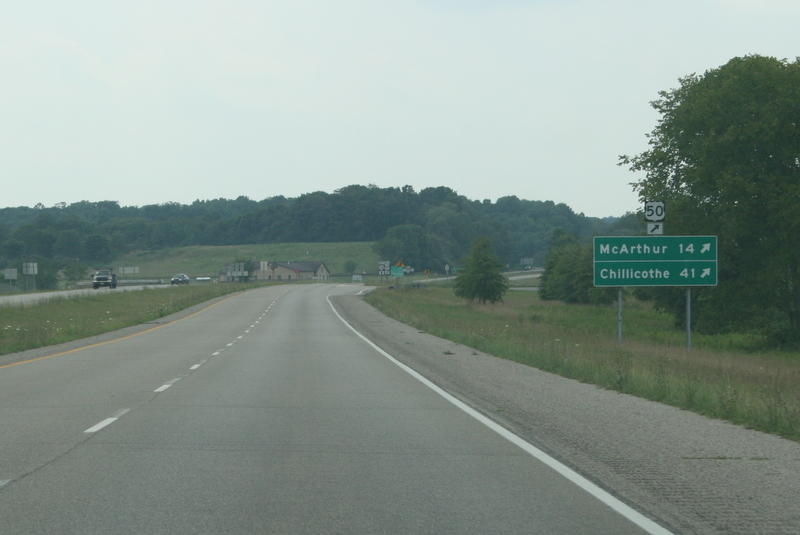
SR 32 running concurrently with US 50 in southwestern Athens County

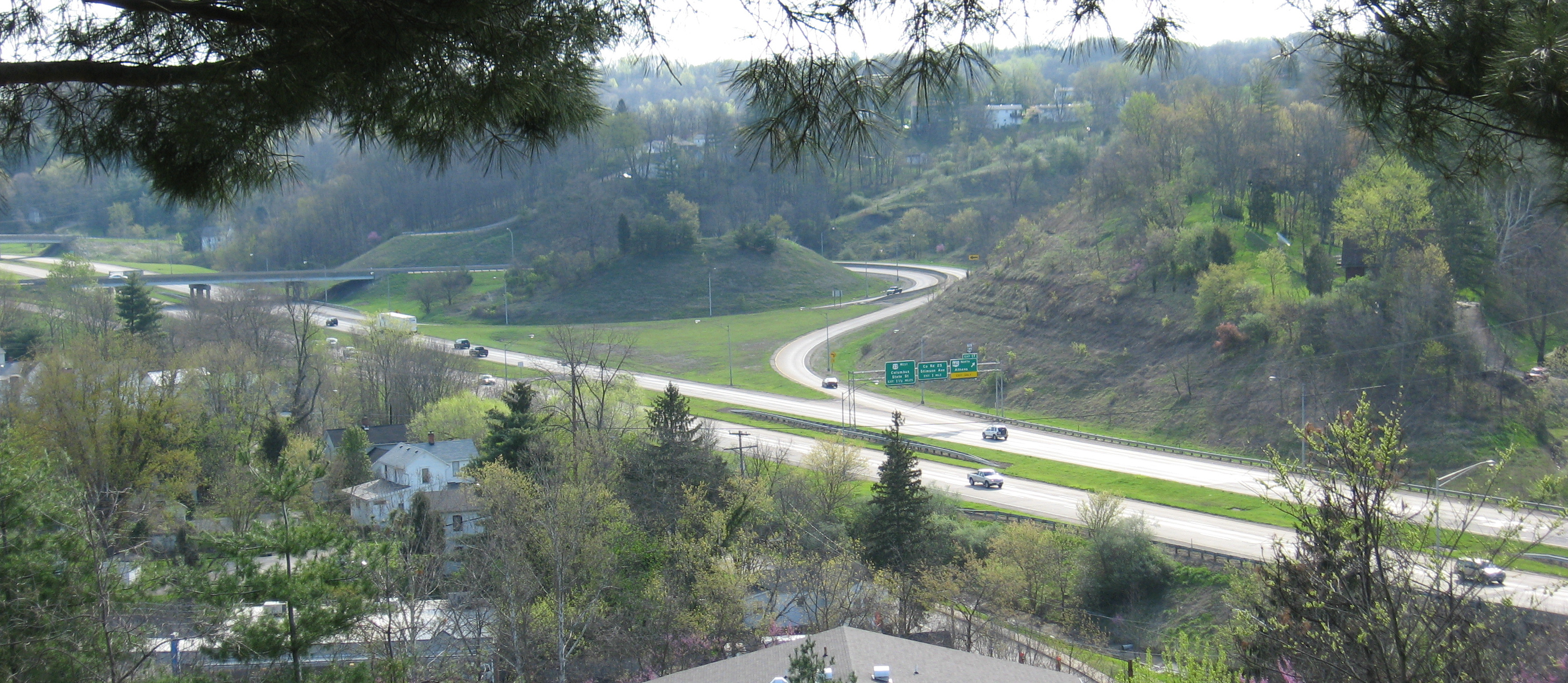
US 33 during its brief concurrency with US 50 and SR 32 in Athens

State Route 32 (SR 32), also known as the James A. Rhodes Appalachian Highway, is a major east–west highway across the southern portion of the U.S. state of Ohio. It is the eighth longest state route in Ohio, spanning southern Ohio from Cincinnati to Belpre, across the Ohio River from Parkersburg, West Virginia. Except in Belpre, leading up to the bridge into West Virginia, the entire route outside Cincinnati's beltway (Interstate 275, I-275) is a high-speed four-lane divided highway, forming the Ohio portion of Corridor D of the Appalachian Development Highway System.

== Route description ==
SR 32 begins at a junction with Columbia Parkway (U.S. Route 50, US 50) in eastern Cincinnati, near the border between the neighborhoods of Linwood, Mount Lookout, and Columbia-Tusculum, in the area of Lunken Field. It follows Beechmont Avenue, running concurrently with SR 125, until it crosses the Little Miami River, where it turns north on Batavia Road and continues past Newtown.

At the Clermont County line, the road becomes the Appalachian Highway, a four-lane, limited-access divided highway that is part of Corridor D. Between I-275 and Mount Orab, the highway alternates between at-grade and grade-separated interchanges. In Pike County, it runs concurrently with SR 772, then with SR 124. Next, it intersects the ramps to US 23 in Piketon.

There is an unusual interchange configuration near Jackson at US 35, which is an expressway in both directions. Each highway has ramps that exit to the other highway, with right-turning traffic merging onto the second highway, but left-turning traffic coming to an at-grade intersection. Both highways end up having at-grade intersections, albeit with a grade separation of the main highway corridors. This interchange type is sometimes termed a "windmill" interchange, but it is not related to the interchange type of the same name. This junction is the only interchange of its type known to exist in the world.

SR 124 departs at Roads. US 50 rejoins SR 32 in front of the Gordon K. Bush Airport in Albany. The two routes briefly run concurrently with US 33 in Athens.

Near Coolville, SR 7 joins from the south. Just before Belpre, US 50 and Corridor D turn south, crossing the Ohio River on the Blennerhassett Island Bridge toward Parkersburg, West Virginia. SR 32 and the Appalachian Highway continue eastward through Belpre. The Appalachian Highway ends just west of the Ohio River; SR 7 turns north, remaining a limited-access divided highway, while SR 32 continues as a surface street for a few blocks until meeting the Memorial Bridge, a toll bridge across the Ohio River into Parkersburg.

== History ==
The Batavia Turnpike and Miami Bridge Company was incorporated and chartered by the state of Ohio. It built a road, which was "about finished" as of 1841, beginning at the Wooster Turnpike (Eastern Avenue), crossing the Little Miami River on the Union Bridge, and turning east to Batavia. The Ohio Turnpike to Bethel split after the Little Miami was crossed.

The passage of the McGuire Bill in 1911 led to the designation of a large number of Inter-County Highways to be maintained by the Ohio Department of Highways. This network included the Cincinnati-Batavia Road (Inter-County Highway 41, ICH 41) and Batavia-Winchester Road (ICH 125), connecting Cincinnati to Batavia, Williamsburg, Mt. Orab, Sardinia, Winchester, and beyond to an intersection with the West Union-Belfast Road (ICH 122) south of Seaman (where Graces Run Road now meets SR 247). This entire route from Cincinnati to south of Seaman was designated and signed as State Route 74 in 1923. The route left downtown Cincinnati on Eastern Avenue, shared with SR 7 (now US 52) and SR 25 (now SR 125). SR 7 left at Davis Lane (now Airport Road), while SR 25 and SR 74 turned onto Beechmont Avenue, splitting after crossing the Little Miami River. By 1925, the eastern end of SR 74 had been realigned and extended, heading east from Winchester through Seaman and continuing through Peebles to SR 73 northwest of Rarden; the old alignment (Graces Run Road) reverted to local control. Along with US 50, US 52, and SR 125, SR 74 was moved to Columbia Parkway in the early 1940s, and in the early 1950s it was removed from downtown Cincinnati to its present terminus. Due to the existence of I-74 west of Cincinnati, the number was changed to SR 32 in 1962; SR 74 signs were removed in June 1963 after a period of dual signage. The designation had originally been applied to a route running from the Indiana border west of Celina to Marysville; in 1938 it was replaced by US 33 east of St. Marys, and a rerouted SR 54, later SR 29, to the west.

The state relocated the road between Mount Carmel and Batavia as a four-lane divided highway in the early 1960s, several years after the parallel SR 125 was widened (but not realigned). Because this was done before or during the renumbering, the old road here is known as Old State Route 74, rather than Old State Route 32 to the east. Improvement of the rest of the road did not take place until after it was added to the Appalachian Development Highway System in 1965. This proposed Appalachian Highway—part of Corridor D—was to run across the southern part of the state from I-275 outside Cincinnati to Belpre. From the east end of SR 32 east of Peebles, the route was to continue northeast, joining SR 772 near Elmgrove, and following SR 124 beyond Jackson to Roads. After continuing northeast to Radcliff, it would parallel SR 346 and a portion of SR 143, merging with US 50 west of Albany and following it past Athens and Coolville to Belpre. A never-built branch, planned as part of Corridor B, would have followed SR 73 and SR 348 from east of Peebles to Lucasville on US 23 (Corridor C).

In 1998, the Ohio Department of Transportation (ODOT) inspected a section of SR 32 in Jackson County due to repeated pavement failure and pothole subsidence featured in the median. Abandoned underground mines were visible near the roadway, but there were no mine maps available for the area. An electrical resistivity tomography was conducted to see if there were mine voids underneath the roadway. Several pits at 9.8-foot-deep (3.0 m) were excavated revealing that mine voids were detected. In response to the tests, ODOT closed the highway 1.5 miles (2.4 km) east of Wellston and began excavating the roadway to remediate the mine subsidence in November 1998. Work to repair the roadway was completed in March 1999.

In 2002, two interchanges were constructed along SR 32. Olive Branch–Stonelick Road intersection in Clermont County was constructed into an interchange. The $7 million project (equivalent to $11.6 million in 2024) was jointly funded by Clermont County and ODOT's Transportation Review Advisory Council (TRAC). The interchange project was awarded the Donald C. Schramm Award by the American Society of Highway Engineers (ASHE) Triko Valley Section in 2002. Work also began on replacing two at-grade intersections of SR 124 and SR 327 into a single interchange near Wellston in Jackson County. The $9 million project (equivalent to $15 million in 2024) was funded jointly by the Federal Highway Safety Infrastructure program and ODOT's Highway Safety Program (HSP). The project was completed in July 2004 at cost of $12.5 million, an increase of $3.5 million than originally estimated (equivalent to $19.8 million and $5.55 million in 2024, respectively).

Work began in Brown County in early 2023 for a diamond interchange project on SR 32 located between Bodman and Brooks-Malott Roads, approximately one mile (1.6 km) west of Mount Orab. Both existing at-grade intersections were removed, along with the traffic signal at SR 32 and Brooks-Malott Road. The project was completed at the end of 2024.

== Future ==
The portion of SR 32 in Clermont, Brown, Highland, Adams, and Pike counties was under consideration as the eastward continuation of I-74 from Cincinnati to Piketon in 1991, where it would have connected with I-73 as part of the North-South I-73/I-74 Corridor created in the Intermodal Surface Transportation Efficiency Act (ISTEA) of 1991. Heavy local opposition in the late 1990s to build I-74 through Cincinnati and I-73 around Columbus and north through Michigan forced ODOT to cancel any further plans to extend I-74 east of Cincinnati or I-73 from Portsmouth and Columbus to Toledo through Ohio.

A construction project that is a part of the Eastern Corridor, is redesigning SR 32 from I-275 to Batavia. This segment of construction began in 2012. The plan is to remove all signalized intersections east of I-275 and eventually replace it with a limited-access highway to Batavia. Funding for the final segments, which call for the construction of interchanges at Glen Este-Withamsville and Bach-Buxton Roads, amounts to $83.1 million (equivalent to $100 million in 2024). The project funding was awarded in November 2019 with construction beginning in 2021. The Consolidated Appropriations Act signed into law in December 2022 also provided funding.

== Major intersections ==
County	Location	mi	km	Exit	Destinations	Notes
Hamilton	Cincinnati (Linwood)	0.00– 0.13	0.00– 0.21		US 50 (Columbia Parkway) / US 50 Truck (Eastern Avenue) / SR 561 north (Linwood Avenue) – Downtown Cincinnati	Western end of SR 125 concurrency; interchange; southern terminus of SR 561
Hamilton	Cincinnati (Linwood)	0.41	0.66		Wilmer Avenue / Wooster Road - Lunken Airport	Interchange
Hamilton	Anderson Township	1.38– 1.79	2.22– 2.88		SR 125 east (Beechmont Avenue)	Eastern end of SR 125 concurrency; interchange
Clermont	Union Township	8.72– 9.20	14.03– 14.81		I-275 to I-71 / US 52 – Columbus, Kentucky	I-275 exit 63
Clermont	Union Township	9.47– 9.71	15.24– 15.63		Eastgate Boulevard (CR 341)	Interchange
Clermont	Union Township	10.20	16.42		Glen Este-Withamsville Road	Future interchange
Clermont	Union Township	11.04	17.77		Bach-Buxton Road	Interchange
Clermont	Batavia Township	12.27– 12.73	19.75– 20.49		Olive Branch–Stonelick Road (CR 99)	Interchange
Clermont	Batavia	14.12– 14.32	22.72– 23.05		Main Street (CR 171) - Batavia	Interchange; eastbound exit and westbound entrance
Clermont	Batavia Township	14.97– 15.27	24.09– 24.57		SR 132 / SR 222 – Batavia, Owensville	Interchange
Clermont	Batavia Township	18.07– 18.33	29.08– 29.50		Batavia Road (CR 368) / James Sauls Sr. Drive	Interchange
Clermont	Williamsburg Township	19.45– 19.82	31.30– 31.90		Half Acre Road (CR 59)	Interchange
Clermont	Williamsburg Township	21.17– 21.41	34.07– 34.46		SR 133 – Williamsburg	Interchange
Brown	Mt. Orab	27.2	43.8	27	Bruce Lunsford Way	Interchange opened in October 2024
Brown	Mt. Orab	28.89– 29.37	46.49– 47.27		US 68 – Mt. Orab, Fayetteville	Interchange
Highland	No major junctions					
Brown	Sardinia	35.65	57.37		SR 134 north / Purdy Road (CR 76) – Lynchburg, Sardinia	Southern terminus of SR 134
Brown	Eagle Township	41.22	66.34		US 62 – Hillsboro, Russellville, Ripley, Southern State Community College	
Adams	Winchester	45.85	73.79		SR 136 (Main Street) – Winchester, Cherry Fork, Manchester	
Adams	Seaman	50.42	81.14		SR 247 (Main Street) – Seaman, West Union, Adams County Salamon Airport	
Adams	Meigs Township	58.84	94.69		SR 41 – Peebles, West Union	
Adams	Franklin Township	64.13	103.21		SR 73 – Hillsboro, Rarden	
Pike	Sunfish Township	76.95	123.84		SR 772 south – Rarden	Western end of SR 772 concurrency
Pike	Newton Township	79.01	127.15		SR 124 west / SR 772 north / Tennyson Road – Latham, Pike Lake State Park	Eastern end of SR 772 concurrency; western end of SR 124 concurrency
Pike	Jasper	82.71	133.11		SR 104 – Waverly, Portsmouth	
Pike	Seal Township	84.14– 84.27	135.41– 135.62		US 23 – Chillicothe, Portsmouth	Interchange
Pike	Seal Township	87.56	140.91		SR 220 west / Schuster Road 81 – Waverly	Eastern terminus of SR 220
Pike	Marion Township	94.86	152.66		SR 335 – Beaver, Stockdale	
Jackson	Scioto Township	102.87	165.55		SR 776 – Jackson	
Jackson	Franklin Township	105.83	170.32		SR 139 – Jackson, Minford	
Jackson	Lick Township	108.10– 108.40	173.97– 174.45		SR 93 – Jackson, Oak Hill	Interchange
Jackson	Lick Township	108.94– 109.40	175.32– 176.06		US 35 – Gallipolis, Chillicothe	"Windmill" interchange
Jackson	Milton Township	114.35– 114.80	184.03– 184.75	17	SR 327 / SR 124 east – Wellston	Eastern end of SR 124 concurrency; interchange
Vinton	Vinton Township	125.07	201.28		SR 160 – Hamden, Wilkesville	
Meigs	Columbia Township	130.99	210.81		SR 689 south / County Road 55 – Wilkesville	Northern terminus of SR 689
Athens	Lee Township	133.76	215.27		SR 143 – Middleport	
Athens	Lee Township	134.78	216.91		US 50 west – McArthur, Chillicothe	Western end of US 50 concurrency
Athens	Albany	136.91– 137.24	220.34– 220.87		SR 681 – Albany	Interchange
Athens	Athens	144.60– 145.31	232.71– 233.85	170	US 33 east / Richland Avenue – Pomeroy, Ravenswood	Western end of US 33 concurrency; interchange
Athens	Athens	145.53– 145.93	234.21– 234.85	198	SR 682 north to SR 56 – Athens	Interchange; southern terminus of SR 682
Athens	Athens Township	146.55	235.85	197C	County Road 25 / Stimson Avenue	Interchange
Athens	Athens Township	146.65– 147.05	236.01– 236.65	173	US 33 west / State Street – Columbus	Eastern end of US 33 concurrency; interchange
Athens	Canaan Township	149.54– 149.73	240.66– 240.97	176	East State Street (CR 40)	Interchange
Athens	Canaan Township	151.93	244.51		SR 690 north – Strouds Run State Park	Southern terminus of SR 690
Athens	Rome Township	156.64	252.09		SR 329 north – Stewart, Guysville	Southern terminus of SR 329
Athens	Troy Township	165.92– 166.42	267.02– 267.83		SR 7 south – Pomeroy, Gallipolis	Western end of SR 7 concurrency; interchange
Athens	Troy Township	167.52	269.60		SR 144 – Stewart, Hockingport	
Athens	Troy Township	170.52	274.43		SR 124 west / CR 61 – Hockingport	Eastern terminus of SR 124
Washington	Belpre Township	174.37	280.62		SR 555 north – Bartlett	Southern terminus of SR 555
Washington	Belpre Township	175.16– 175.76	281.89– 282.86		SR 618 east – Belpre	Interchange; eastbound exit and westbound entrance; western terminus of SR 618
Washington	Belpre Township	176.36– 176.90	283.82– 284.69		SR 339 – Beverly	Interchange
Washington	Belpre Township	176.14– 177.22	283.47– 285.21		US 50 east (Blennerhassett Island Bridge) to I-77 – Parkersburg	Eastern end of US 50 concurrency; interchange
Washington	Belpre	181.49	292.08		SR 7 north – Marietta	eastern end of SR 7 concurrency; interchange
Washington	Belpre	181.81	292.59		SR 618 east (Main Street) to SR 7 north / Toll Bridge – Parkersburg	Western end of SR 618 concurrency
Washington	Belpre	182.58	293.83		SR 618 west (Washington Boulevard)	Eastern end of SR 618 concurrency
Washington	Belpre	182.65– 182.71	293.95– 294.04		WV 618 east to WV 68 / I-77 – Parkersburg	West Virginia state line (Parkersburg–Belpre Bridge over Ohio River)
1.000 mi = 1.609 km; 1.000 km = 0.621 mi: Concurrency terminus; Incomplete access
