= Ohio State Route 618 =

State highway in Washington County, Ohio, US

State Route 618

Route information
- Maintained by ODOT
- Length: 7.45 mi (11.99 km)
- Existed: 1937–present

Major junctions
- West end: US 50 / SR 7 / SR 32 near Belpre
- East end: SR 7 in Belpre

Location
- Country: United States
- State: Ohio
- Counties: Washington

Highway system
- Ohio State Highway System; Interstate; US; State; Scenic
← SR 617	→ SR 619

State Route 618 (SR 618) is a 7.45-mile (11.99 km) long east–west state highway in the southeastern quadrant of the U.S. state of Ohio. The western terminus of SR 618 is at an interchange with the concurrency of U.S. Route 50 (US 50), SR 7 and SR 32 about 3.25 miles (5.23 km) west of Belpre. Its eastern terminus is in northern Belpre at an interchange with SR 7.

== Route description ==
All of SR 618 runs through the southwestern portion of Washington County. This highway is not included as a part of the National Highway System (NHS). The NHS is a system of routes deemed to be most important for the economy, mobility and defense of the country.

== History ==
SR 618 was applied in 1937. The highway was originally routed along what is now SR 7 and SR 32 and, in part, US 50, from the point that marks the western terminus of SR 618 into Belpre. Meanwhile, what is now designated as SR 618 was the routing of US 50 and SR 7 at the time.

In 1965, SR 618 and US 50/SR 7 switched alignments. SR 618 was routed onto its present alignment, while US 50 and SR 7 was moved onto the former alignment of SR 618, which was widened into a four-lane divided highway simultaneous to the alignment swap.

== Major intersections ==
The entire route is in Washington County.

Location	mi	km	Destinations	Notes
Belpre Township	0.00	0.00	US 50 west / SR 7 south / SR 32 west – Pomeroy, Athens	Interchange; no access to US 50 eastbound / from US 50 westbound
Belpre Township	1.41	2.27	SR 339 north – Barlow	Southern terminus of SR 339
Belpre	6.23	10.03	SR 32 east (Parkersburg–Belpre Bridge) to WV 68 / I-77 – Parkersburg	Western end of SR 32 concurrency
Belpre	7.00	11.27	SR 32 west to SR 7 south / US 50 / Memorial Bridge	Eastern end of SR 32 concurrency
Belpre	7.45	11.99	SR 7 north – Marietta	Interchange; no access to SR 7 southbound / from SR 7 northbound
1.000 mi = 1.609 km; 1.000 km = 0.621 mi: Concurrency terminus; Incomplete access
