= Ohio State Route 339 =

State highway in southeastern Ohio, US

State Route 339

Route information
- Maintained by ODOT
- Length: 34.56 mi (55.62 km)
- Existed: 1933–present

Major junctions
- South end: SR 618 near Belpre
- US 50 / SR 7 / SR 32 near Belpre
- North end: SR 821 near Dexter City

Location
- Country: United States
- State: Ohio
- Counties: Washington, Morgan, Noble

Highway system
- Ohio State Highway System; Interstate; US; State; Scenic
← SR 338	→ SR 340

State Route 339 (SR 339) is a north–south state highway in southeastern Ohio, a U.S. state. The southern terminus of SR 339 is at SR 618 approximately 2 miles (3.2 km) west of Belpre, and less than 0.50 miles (0.80 km) south of the U.S. Route 50 (US 50)/SR 7/SR 32 expressway. The highway's northern terminus is a T-intersection with SR 821 about 0.75 miles (1.21 km) south of Dexter City.

== Route description ==
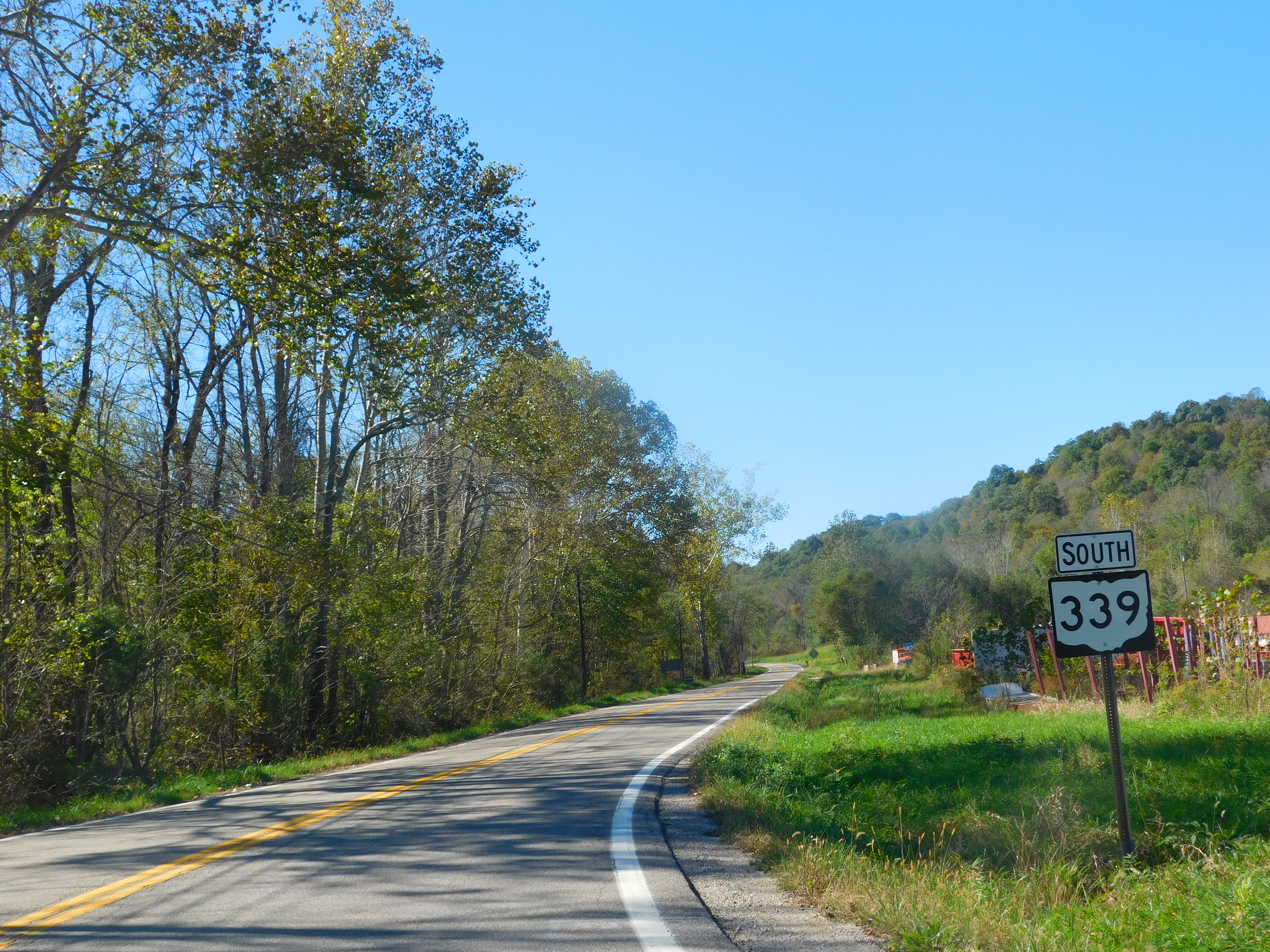
SR 339 southbound in Dexter City

SR 339's routing takes it through portions of the counties of Washington, Morgan and Noble. No portion of SR 339 is included within the National Highway System, a network of highways deemed most important for the economy, mobility and defense of the nation.

== History ==
SR 339 was established in 1933. It was initially a spur route that ran along its present alignment from its northern terminus at SR 821, at the time a part of US 21, southwesterly to approximately its southern intersection with County Road 75 (CR 75) in southern Noble County. This would only be temporary, as in 1935 the highway was extended southwesterly to a new southern terminus at its eastern junction with SR 60, then designated as SR 77, in Beverly.

In 1972, as a result of the designation of Interstate 76 (I-76) to Ohio, the SR 76 designation was eliminated. The route northwest of Beverly was given the designation of SR 83, while the portion south of Beverly became an extension of SR 339, which now ended at its present southern terminus at SR 618 near Belpre.

== Major intersections ==
County	Location	mi	km	Destinations	Notes
Washington	Belpre Township	0.00	0.00	SR 618 (Washington Boulevard)	
Washington	Belpre Township	0.32	0.51	US 50 / SR 7 / SR 32 – Belpre, Pomeroy, Athens	Interchange
Washington	Barlow Township	8.57	13.79	SR 550 – Athens, Marietta	
Washington	Watertown Township	13.49	21.71	SR 676 west	Southern end of SR 676 concurrency
Washington	Watertown Township	13.64	21.95	SR 676 east (Lancaster Street) – Marietta	Northern end of SR 676 concurrency
Washington	Beverly	20.44	32.89	SR 60 north (5th Street) / Ferry Street – McConnelsville	Southern end of SR 60 concurrency
Washington	Beverly	20.62	33.18	SR 60 south (5th Street) / Center Street – Marietta	Northern end of SR 60 concurrency
Noble	Jefferson Township	34.56	55.62	SR 821 to I-77	
1.000 mi = 1.609 km; 1.000 km = 0.621 mi: Concurrency terminus
