= Captain Jonathan Stone House =

Historic house in Ohio, United States

- Capt. Jonathan Stone House
- U.S. National Register of Historic Places
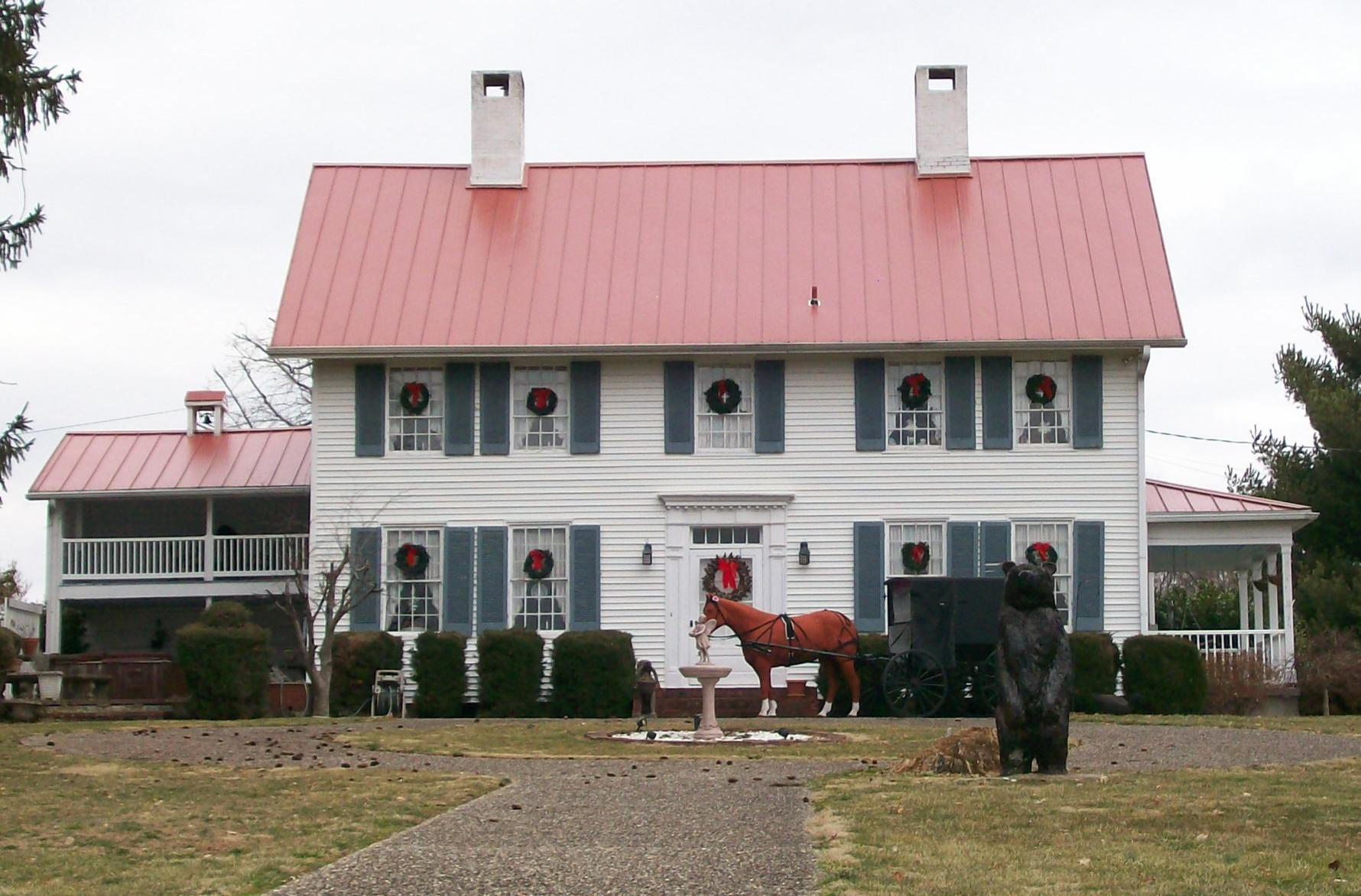
- Front of the house

- Location within Ohio Location within the United States
- Location: 612 Blennerhassett Ave., Belpre, Ohio
- Coordinates: 39.27096°N 81.57690°W
- Area: 1 acre (0.40 ha)
- Built: 1799
- Architect: Jonathan Stone
- NRHP reference No.: 78002209
- Added to NRHP: February 7, 1978

The Captain Jonathan Stone House is a historic residence in the city of Belpre, Ohio, United States. Built just ten years after Belpre's 1789 establishment on the north bank of the Ohio River, it is the oldest existing building in the city.

Born in 1751, Jonathan Stone joined the Continental Army early in the American Revolutionary War. After the Treaty of Paris, he moved to the Belpre vicinity. He and his family built a fortification on their land during a war with local Native Americans in the early 1790s; it was known as "Stone's Fort." As the Belpre region developed, Stone became a leading member of the area's society; he was elected treasurer of Washington County, and he was one of the three commissioners chosen to survey lands for the future Ohio University in Athens to the west.

Stone's house in Belpre is a two-story structure; except for a small wing on the rear northwestern corner, it is a rectangular building. The entire structure rests on a foundation of sandstone, and it is covered by a metal roof. Among its owners since Stone have been Dr. Thomas and Janet Barrett. At some point after Stone's life, the house was moved to its present location at 612 Blennerhassett Avenue. In 1978, the Stone House was listed on the National Register of Historic Places because of its historically significant architecture; it was seen as historic because of its place as a rare surviving example of Ohio's earliest residential architecture. It is one of four Belpre locations on the Register, along with the Charles Rice Ames House, the Sixth Street Railroad Bridge, and Spencer's Landing.

Capt. Jonathan's son, Colonel John Stone, was another occupant of the house. He was an abolitionist with a bounty on his head offered by defenders of slavery in the state of Virginia; he therefore did not cross the river to Parkersburg (in what is now West Virginia) for more than 20 years. He is known to have "spirited many escaped slaves northward toward Canada".
