= Ohio State Route 772 =

State highway in south-central Ohio, US

State Route 772

Route information
- Maintained by ODOT
- Length: 45.99 mi (74.01 km)
- Existed: 1937–present

Major junctions
- South end: SR 73 in Rarden
- SR 32 / SR 124 in Tennyson
- North end: US 50 / SR 104 in Chillicothe

Location
- Country: United States
- State: Ohio
- Counties: Scioto, Pike, Ross

Highway system
- Ohio State Highway System; Interstate; US; State; Scenic
← SR 771	→ SR 773

State Route 772 (SR 772) is a north–south state highway in the south-central portion of the U.S. state of Ohio. Its southern terminus is at SR 73 in Rarden. Leaving Rarden, the route increases in elevation to Mount Joy, the highest point in Scioto County. After weaving between Scioto and Pike County for about four miles (6.4 km), the route joins the Appalachian Highway, SR 32 and subsequently SR 124. Following these concurrences, SR 772 continues its journey north through scenic terrain and small communities until it reaches its northern terminus at the US 50 and SR 104 concurrence in Chillicothe.

== History ==
The first part of SR 772 brought into the state highway system was the section between SR 124 in Idaho and US 23 just south of its current northern terminus in Chillicothe in 1937. By 1939, the route had been extended south to its current southern terminus in Rarden. Only two major changes have occurred to SR 772's routing: At an unknown year, SR 772's northern terminus was moved from a point along the divided SR 104 highway south of Chillicothe to downtown Chillicothe at US 50 and SR 104; when the Appalachian Highway (SR 32) was constructed c. 1973, SR 772 was moved off of a winding two-lane road between Elm Grove and Tennyson and onto the newly constructed four-lane divided highway.

== Major junctions ==
County	Location	mi	km	Destinations	Notes
Scioto	Rarden	0.00	0.00	SR 73 (Main Street)	
Pike	Sunfish Township	15.08	24.27	SR 32 west (James A. Rhodes Appalachian Highway) – Cincinnati	Southern end of SR 32 concurrency
Pike	Newton Township	17.40	28.00	SR 32 east / SR 124 east (James A. Rhodes Appalachian Highway) – Jackson	Northern end of SR 32 concurrency; southern end of SR 124 concurrency
Pike	Pebble Township	19.38	31.19	SR 124 west – Hillsboro	Northern end of SR 124 concurrency
Pike	Pebble Township	21.29	34.26	SR 220 east	Western terminus of SR 220
Ross	Chillicothe	45.99	74.01	US 50 / SR 104 (Main Street) / North Paint Street	
1.000 mi = 1.609 km; 1.000 km = 0.621 mi: Concurrency terminus
