= Rarden =

Rarden can refer to:

- Rarden, Ohio
- The RARDEN cannon
