= Ohio State Route 74 =

State Route 74

Route information
- Maintained by ODOT

Location
- Country: United States
- State: Ohio

Highway system
- Ohio State Highway System; Interstate; US; State; Scenic
← I-74	→ I-75

In Ohio, State Route 74 may refer to:

- Interstate 74 in Ohio, the only Ohio highway numbered 74 since about 1962
- Ohio State Route 74 (1923), now SR 32
