= Gordon K. Bush Airport =

Ohio University Airport Gordon K. Bush Airport
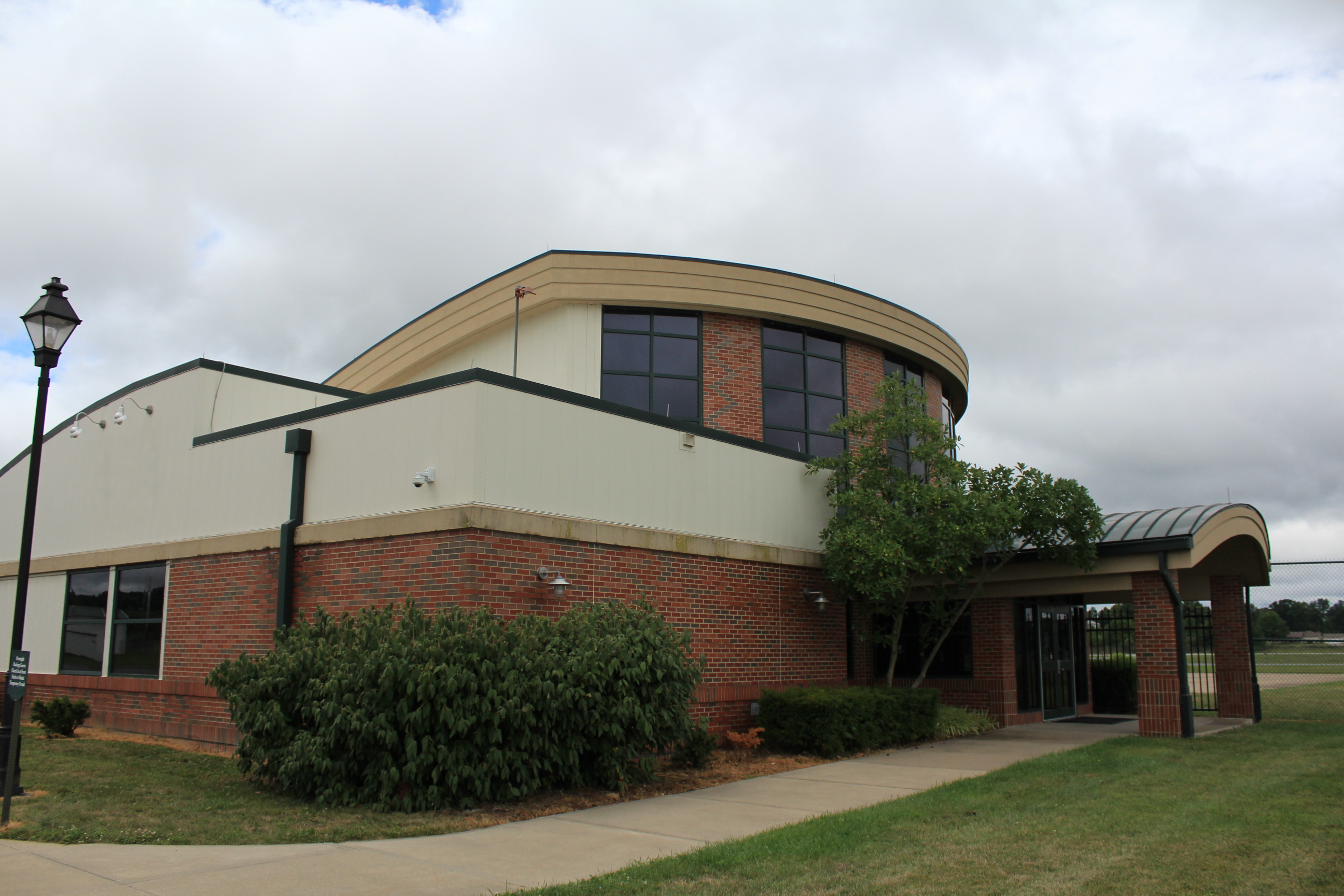
- IATA: ATO; ICAO: KUNI; FAA LID: UNI

Summary
- Airport type: Public
- Owner: Ohio University
- Serves: Athens / Albany, Ohio
- Time zone: UTC−05:00 (-5)
  - Summer (DST): UTC−04:00 (-4)
- Elevation AMSL: 766 ft (233 m)
- Coordinates: 39°12′43″N 082°13′45″W
- Website: www.ohio.edu/airport/

Map
- Location of airport in Ohio UNI (the United States)

Runways
| Direction | Length | | Surface |
| Direction | ft | m | Surface |
|---|---|---|---|
| 7/25 | 5,600 | 1,707 | Asphalt |

Statistics (2021)
- Aircraft operations (year ending 10/05/2021): 110,372
- Based aircraft: 43
- Sources: FAA, airport website

Ohio University Airport, also known as Gordon K. Bush Airport, (IATA: ATO, ICAO: KUNI, FAA LID: UNI), also known as Snyder Field, is a public-use airport located on State Route 32/U.S. 50 in the village of Albany, about ten miles (16 km) southwest of the city of Athens, in Athens County, Ohio, United States.

The airport is owned by Ohio University in Athens, not to be confused with Ohio State University in Columbus, which owns the Ohio State University Airport (IATA/FAA: OSU).

Although most U.S. airports use the same three-letter location identifier for the FAA and IATA, Ohio University Airport is assigned UNI by the FAA and ATO by the IATA (which assigned UNI to the airport on Union Island in Saint Vincent and the Grenadines).

== History ==
Athens County's first airport was located just a few miles east of Athens on U.S. 50. The Rowland Family used to own that airport until Ohio University purchased it in 1943. At the time, the airport was used for civilian aviation and the university's flying program. Despite having only recently extended the runway to 4,000 feet (1,200 m), by the late 1960s, the Athens Bypass was in its planning stages and would have gone through the airport's land. With this, the university decided to look for a new location.

The university finally chose a location just west of Albany and the airport was constructed in the early 1970s and opened around 1972. The airport boasted a 4,200-foot (1,300 m) runway and a couple of hangars, one of which was moved from the old location. The facility was renamed Gordon K. Bush Ohio University Airport on 14 July 1973 for the eponymous university trustee and aviation supporter.

Construction began on the airport in 2002 with the construction of the C. David Snyder Terminal and the extension of the runway from 4,200-foot (1,300 m) to 5,600-foot (1,700 m) feet. Two years later, the Richard H. McFarland Avionics Building was opened at the airport.

In 2009, a $3.15 million grant was awarded to the airport from the American Recovery and Reinvestment Act to improve the safety of the airport by filling in valleys and removing hills that surrounded the airport.

The airport received a 2.5 million grant from the state to provide additional hangar space in July 2024.

== Facilities and aircraft ==
Ohio University Airport covers an area of 308 acres (125 ha) which contains one asphalt paved runway (7/25) measuring 5,600 ft × 100 ft (1,707 m × 30 m).

The airport has a fixed-base operator that offers fuel services, a pilot lounge and snooze room, flight training, mechanics, courtesy transportation, conference rooms, and showers on site.

For the 12-month period ending October 5, 2021, the airport had 110,372 aircraft operations, an average of 302 per day: 99% general aviation, <1% air taxi, and <1% military. Per 2021 numbers, there are 43 aircraft based at this airport: 35 single-engine and 8 multi-engine airplanes.

== Aviation program ==
The aviation program started training pilots in 1939. The training aircraft consist of two Beechcraft Barons, three Cessna 172s, six Cirrus SR20s and multiple Piper PA-28 Warrior IIIs. The students earn private pilot through multi-engine instructor certificates in these airplanes along with associate degrees in Aviation Technology or Bachelor of Science degrees in Aviation Science.

Ohio University's Avionics Engineering Center specializes in the research, development, and evaluation of electronic navigation and communication. The avionics center utilizes a Douglas DC-3 and an Aero L-29 Delfín among other piston aircraft.

== Accidents and incidents ==
- On June 9, 2006, a Cessna 172 Skyhawk contacted a ditch following a loss of directional control during a landing roll. The pilot reported he was blown off course by the wind during his first landing approach, so he initiated a go around. During the second landing, the airplane touched down, and after all three landing gear were on the ground, the airplane veered to the right. The pilot was not able to regain directional control of the aircraft, and the airplane exited the right side of the runway, where it came to rest in a ditch.
- On June 9, 2008, a Cessna 172 Skyhawk piloted by a student pilot on his first solo flight was substantially damaged when it departed the paved runway surface and then struck a ditch while attempting to land at the Ohio University Airport. The student had just received their solo endorsement after a flight earlier in the day with their flight instructor. After a normal takeoff and traffic pattern, the student pilot inadvertently added power to execute a touch and go while landing rather than the full stop landing they had planned on performing. Upon realizing that he was to execute a full stop landing, the student pilot reduced power and applied the brakes. He reported that the nose wheel began to shimmy and he applied the brakes harder. The airplane subsequently went off the side of the runway into the grass and then struck a ditch before coming to a stop.
- On February 18, 2010, a Cessna 172 Skyhawk with retractable landing gear sustained substantial damage when it struck trees and terrain while approaching to land at the Ohio University Airport. The probable cause of the accident was found to be the pilot's decision to initiate and continue the flight into known icing conditions with an airplane not properly equipped for flight into icing conditions which exceeded the capabilities of the airplane.
- On May 21, 2011, an Aero Commander 100 sustained substantial damage during a hard landing at the Ohio University Airport. The pilot reported that the flight had proceeded normally to UNI. He entered the traffic pattern and established the airplane on final approach to runway 25, and the approach was stable. As the airplane settled to the runway, a "wind gust raised the nose" and slowed the airplane. The pilot added power, but the airplane "dropped a short distance" to the runway. The pilot reported that "the contact was not hard but resulted in a failure and collapse of the right main gear." The airplane skidded off the right side of the runway, resulting in a collapsed nose gear and a propeller strike. The probable cause of the accident was found to be the pilot's failure to maintain adequate airspeed in the flare, which resulted in a stall and a hard landing.
- On April 5, 2014, a Bellanca 17-30A Viking airplane impacted trees and terrain while on approach to the Ohio University Airport. A witness who observed the pilot before flight said the pilot had monitored the fueling process and had confirmed the fuel caps were secured before departure. Another witness, who saw the airplane crash, said she saw that the airplane's left wing was low and the right wing was high just before impacting a neighbor's tree at the end of her driveway; she said the engine sounded normally and had a constant pitch sound. The probable cause of the accident was found to be the pilot's loss of airplane control during the approach to landing.
- On March 29, 2017, a Piper PA-31 Navajo landed at the airport with a large quantity of drugs believed to be cocaine. The aircraft landed at the airport, which is not a port of entry into the United States, while en route from the Bahamas to Ottawa, Canada; the pilot told officials he was simply trying to pass through American airspace, not land in the U.S., when he was forced to land because one of the plane's engines started smoking. The pilot was eventually sentenced to 8 years in prison.

== See also ==
- List of airports in Ohio
