= Memorial Bridge (Parkersburg, West Virginia) =

- Coordinates: 39°17′00″N 81°33′47″W
- Crosses: Ohio River
- Locale: Parkersburg, West Virginia and Belpre, Ohio
- Official name: Memorial Bridge
- Owner: Parkersburg Bridge Partners
- Maintained by: Parkersburg Bridge Partners

Characteristics
- Design: Cantilevered Warren through truss with 2 polygonal Warren through trusses
- Total length: 2,555.2 ft. (0.5 mi.)
- Width: 27.9 ft.
- Clearance above: 30.0 ft.

History
- Construction end: 1954

Statistics
- Daily traffic: 13,503 cars on average daily
- Toll: $1.35 per crossing with a transponder (MovPass or EZ-Pass), $5.35 without a transponder

Location
- Interactive map of Memorial Bridge

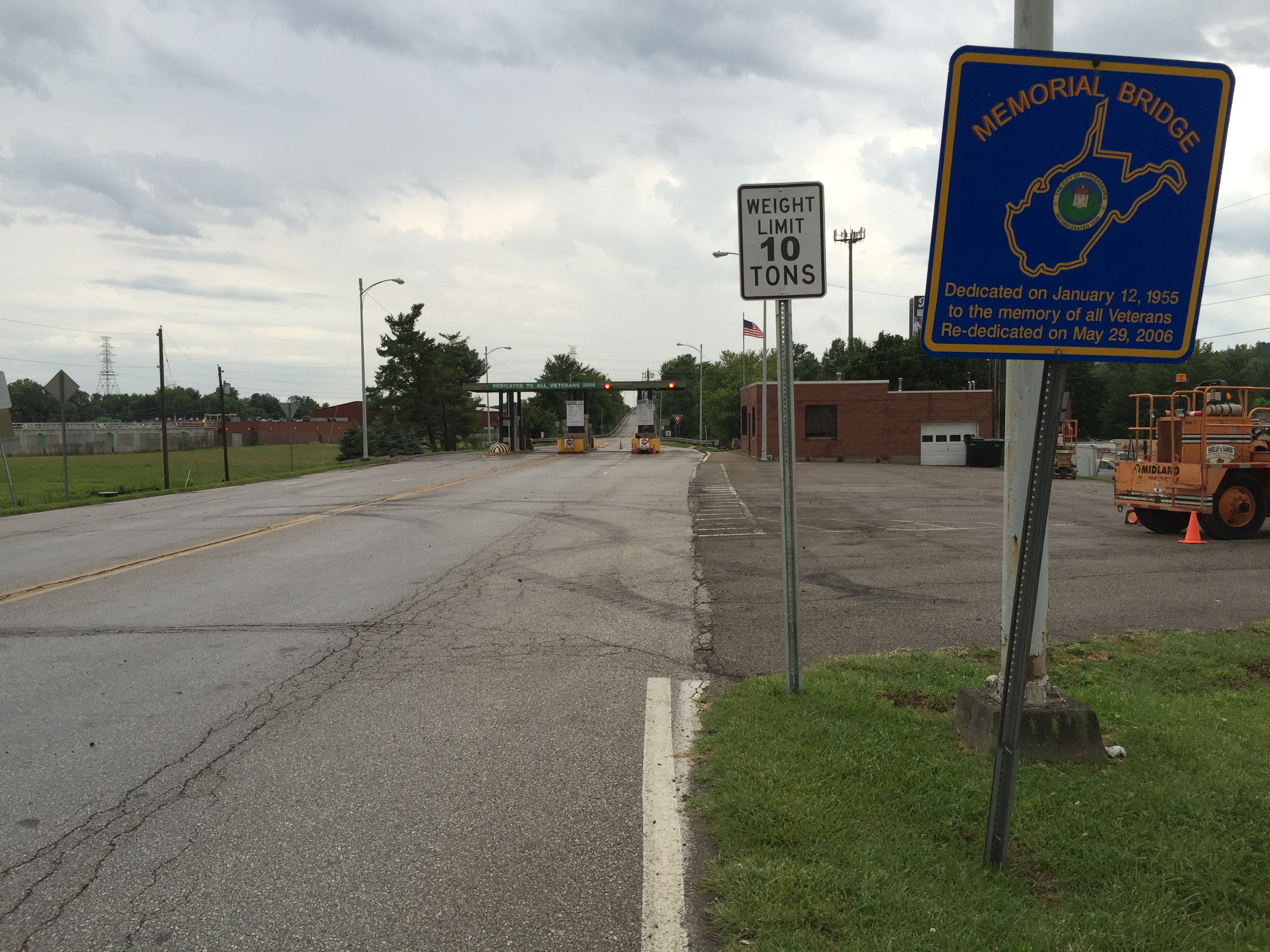
Dedication sign at the west end of the bridge in Parkersburg

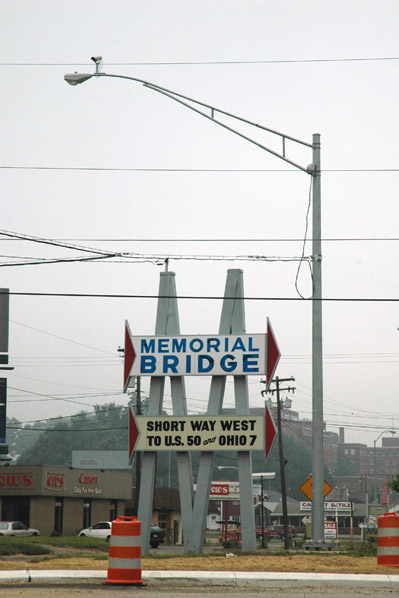
Memorial Bridge signage in Parkersburg, WV.

The Memorial Bridge, locally known as the toll bridge, crosses the Ohio River connecting Belpre, Ohio and Parkersburg, West Virginia. The bridge is an alternate route to access U.S. Route 50 in Ohio from central Parkersburg. Constructed and formerly owned by the City of Parkersburg, the bridge was purchased in 2022 by Parkersburg Bridge Partners, a private entity that is a subsidiary of Colorado-based United Bridge Partners.

While some internal WVDOT documents refer to the bridge as West Virginia Route 140, the number is not signed nor shown on state-issued maps.

The bridge was completed c. 1954, and is of a steel through truss design, a combination of two camelback-Warren through trusses, and a 3-span cantilevered Warren through truss. It accommodates two lanes of traffic, one in either direction.

This bridge used to have a toll for passenger cars of $0.50; travelers also used to purchase tickets to reduce the toll from $0.50 to $0.40 per trip when $2.00 worth was purchased. There were no automatic lanes and E-ZPass was not accepted. As part of the sale and rehabilitation work on the bridge in 2022–23, the toll plaza was replaced by an electronic tolling gantry compatible with E-ZPass or MovPass, a sticker transponder valid with E-ZPass systems that have the capability to read it.

As of August 18, 2022, the bridge had been closed to all traffic indefinitely while a project to make improvements to the bridge was underway. Previously the bridge was reduced to one-way traffic during these improvements, but many vehicles were violating this by going around barriers which prompted the bridge partners to close it for safety of workers. As of August 31, 2023, the bridge was reopened to all traffic.

== See also ==
- List of crossings of the Ohio River

← WV 131	→ WV 150
