= Rarden, Ohio =

- Village
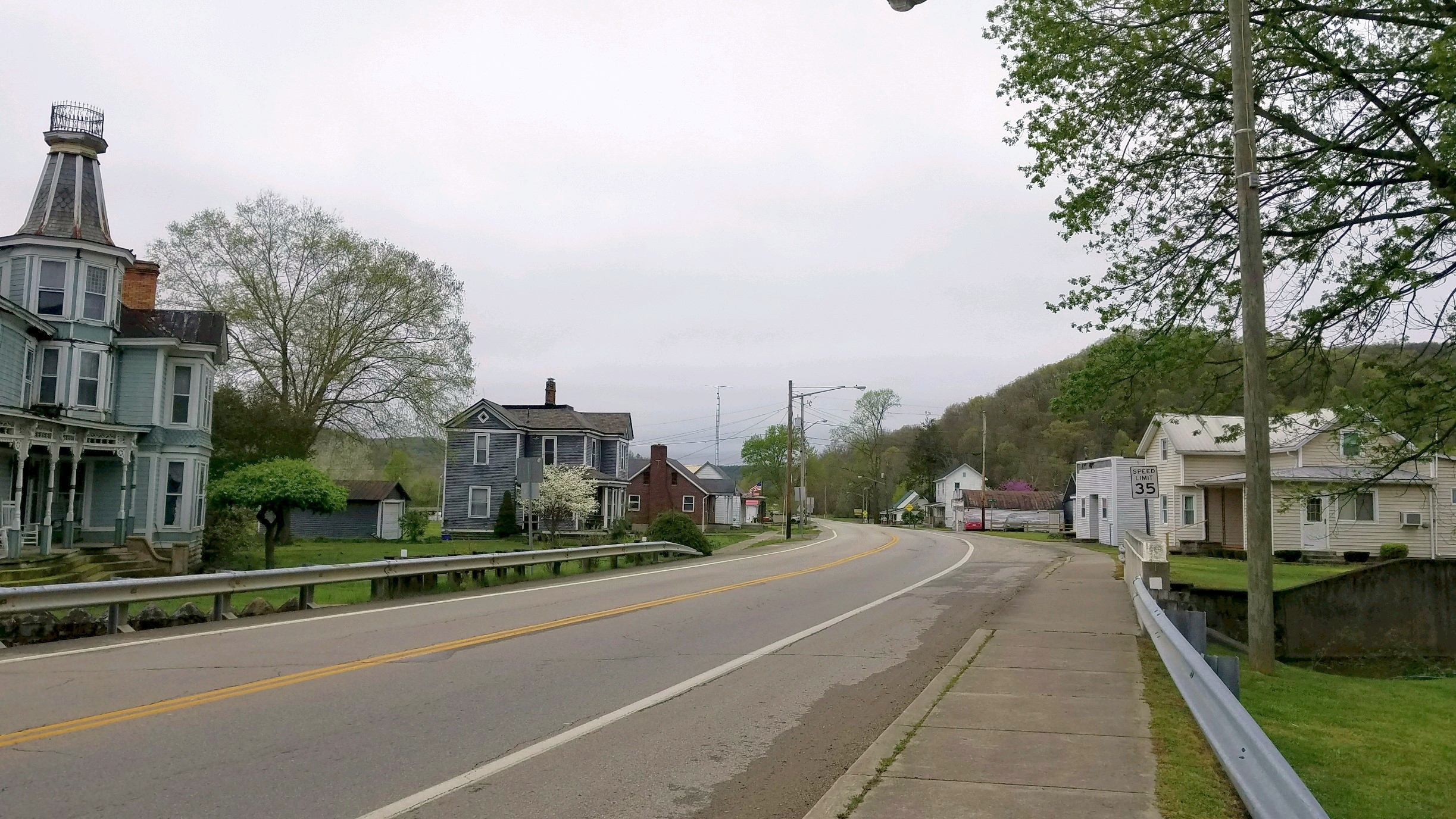
- West Main Street of Rarden, Ohio.

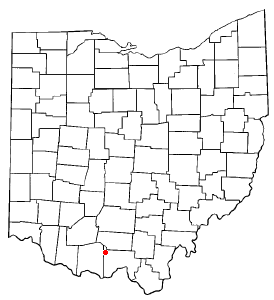
- Location of Rarden, Ohio

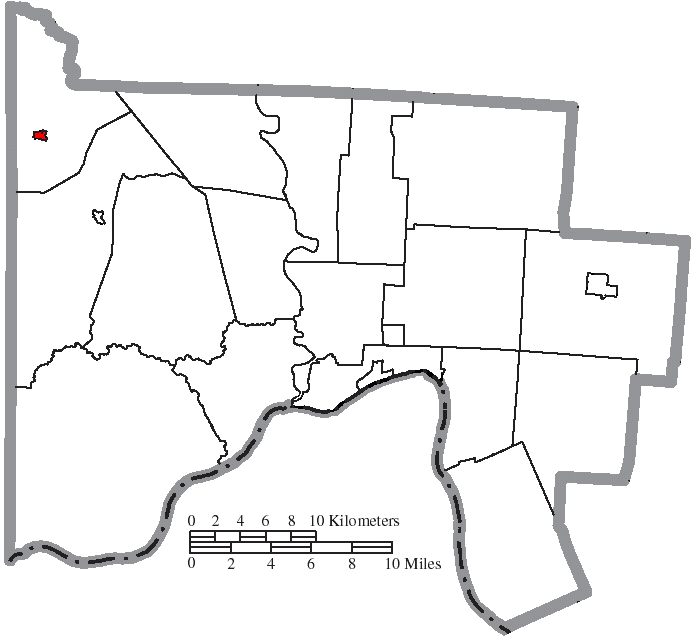
- Location of Rarden in Scioto County
- Coordinates: 38°55′24″N 83°14′33″W
- Country: United States
- State: Ohio
- County: Scioto
- Township: Rarden

Government
  - Type: Village
  - Mayor: Ronald Lewis Syroney
  - Fire Chief: Brad South

Area
  - Total: 0.21 sq mi (0.55 km^{2})
  - Land: 0.21 sq mi (0.55 km^{2})
  - Water: 0 sq mi (0.00 km^{2})
- Elevation: 633 ft (193 m)

Population (2020)
  - Total: 146
  - Estimate (2024): 142
  - Density: 690.1/sq mi (266.44/km^{2})
- Time zone: UTC-5 (Eastern (EST))
  - Summer (DST): UTC-4 (EDT)
- ZIP code: 45671
- Area code: 740
- FIPS code: 39-65508
- GNIS feature ID: 2399044

Rarden is a village in Scioto County, Ohio, United States. The population was 146 at the 2020 census.

== History ==
The village was originally named "Moccasin" by early Pennsylvania settlers, and it originated in 1846. Orvil Grant (1835-1881), brother of Ulysses S. Grant, was an early settler of the town and named it Galena after the Grants' family home in Galena, Illinois. The village was incorporated in 1886 and renamed in honor of an early settler, Thomas Ephrim Rarden. Five years later on January 10, 1891, Rarden Township became a separate entity from Brush Creek Township.

== Geography ==
According to the United States Census Bureau, the village has a total area of 0.21 square miles (0.54 km^{2}), all land.

== Demographics ==
Historical population
Census	Pop.	Note	%±
1890	296		—
1900	443		49.7%
1910	350		−21.0%
1920	302		−13.7%
1930	303		0.3%
1940	306		1.0%
1950	251		−18.0%
1960	250		−0.4%
1970	232		−7.2%
1980	199		−14.2%
1990	184		−7.5%
2000	176		−4.3%
2010	159		−9.7%
2020	146		−8.2%
U.S. Decennial Census

=== 2010 census ===
As of the census of 2010, there were 159 people, 67 households, and 46 families living in the village. The population density was 757.1 inhabitants per square mile (292.3/km^{2}). There were 82 housing units at an average density of 390.5 per square mile (150.8/km^{2}). The racial makeup of the village was 99.4% White and 0.6% Asian.

There were 67 households, of which 29.9% had children under the age of 18 living with them, 49.3% were married couples living together, 10.4% had a female householder with no husband present, 9.0% had a male householder with no wife present, and 31.3% were non-families. 28.4% of all households were made up of individuals, and 13.5% had someone living alone who was 65 years of age or older. The average household size was 2.37 and the average family size was 2.87.

The median age in the village was 42.5 years. 23.9% of residents were under the age of 18; 6.8% were between the ages of 18 and 24; 23.9% were from 25 to 44; 28.3% were from 45 to 64, and 17% were 65 years of age or older. The gender makeup of the village was 46.5% male and 53.5% female.

=== 2000 census ===
As of the census of 2000, there were 176 people, 69 households, and 48 families living in the village. The population density was 860.8 inhabitants per square mile (332.4/km^{2}). There were 82 housing units at an average density of 401.1 per square mile (154.9/km^{2}). The racial makeup of the village was 93.18% White, 3.41% Native American, 0.57% from other races, and 2.84% from two or more races.

There were 69 households, out of which 34.8% had children under the age of 18 living with them, 52.2% were married couples living together, 15.9% had a female householder with no husband present, and 30.4% were non-families. 26.1% of all households were made up of individuals, and 14.5% had someone living alone who was 65 years of age or older. The average household size was 2.55 and the average family size was 3.15.

In the village, the population was spread out, with 24.4% under the age of 18, 8.5% from 18 to 24, 35.2% from 25 to 44, 14.8% from 45 to 64, and 17.0% who were 65 years of age or older. The median age was 36 years. For every 100 females there were 102.3 males. For every 100 females age 18 and over, there were 104.6 males.

The median income for a household in the village was $35,781, and the median income for a family was $36,250. Males had a median income of $30,000 versus $28,500 for females. The per capita income for the village was $13,247. About 1.6% of families and 1.2% of the population were below the poverty line, including none of those under the age of eighteen and 2.8% of those 65 or over.

== Arts and Culture ==
Taylor's Mansion is a 22-room Victorian mansion built in Rarden in 1899 by the owner of the Taylor Stone Company, Lafe Taylor, a businessman and political leader. Throughout the years, the house was used as a residence, hotel, boarding house, nursing home, and local haunted house attraction.

Rarden Lodge No. 919, Independent Order of Odd Fellows, was chartered on May 2, 1911, and consolidated with McDermott Lodge No. 948, in 1922. Odd Fellows Ritual 2004. Odd Fellows Funeral Ceremony Guide.

== Infrastructure ==
The Rarden Volunteer Fire Department was established on July 2, 1960, by George Beatty Syroney. His son, Gregory B. Syroney, started the Junior Firefighters Program on December 13, 1985, on his 13th Birthday with the Rarden Volunteer Fire Department.
