= Parkersburg Bridge (CSX) =

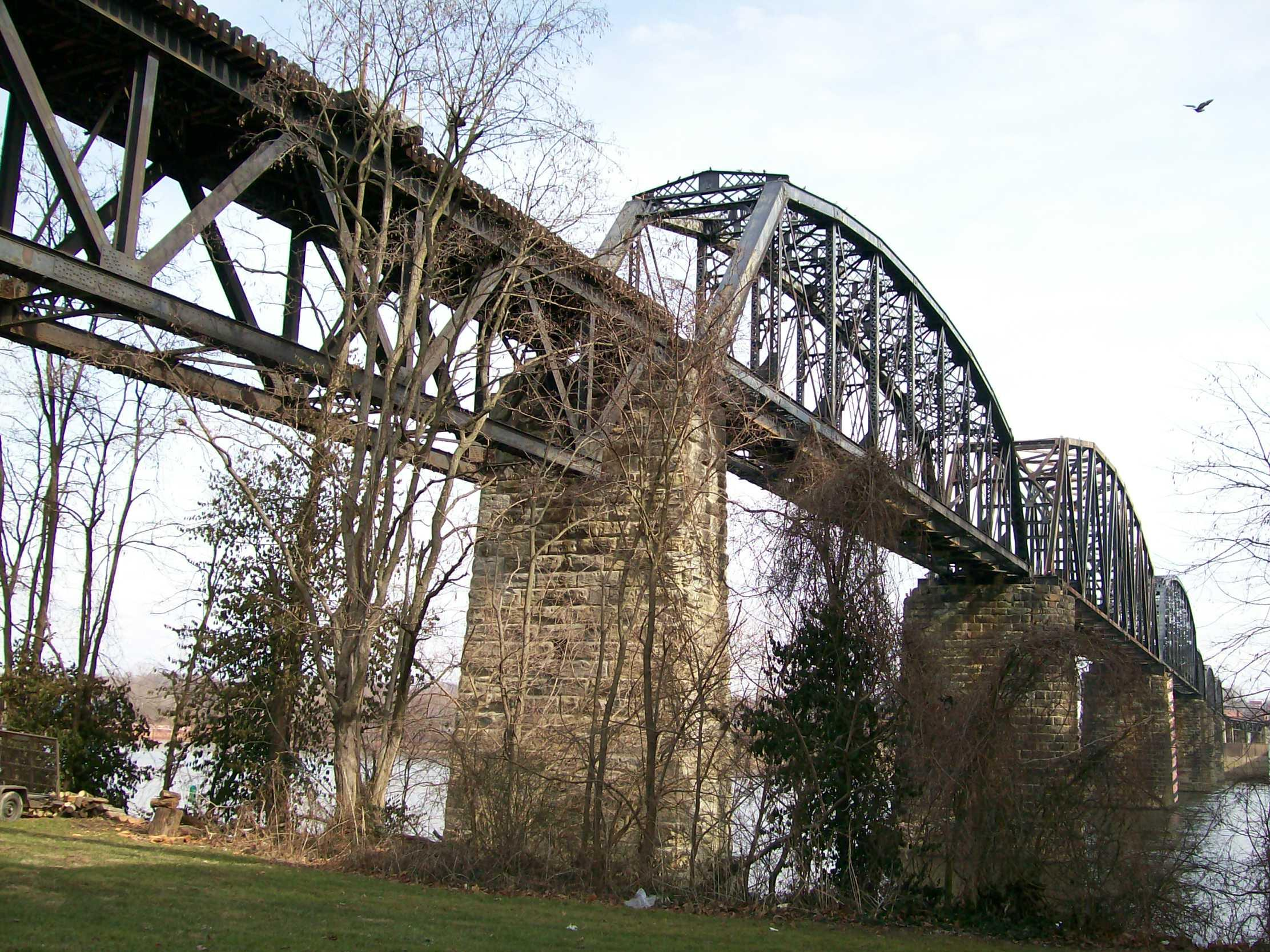
- The CSX Bridge in 2010
- Coordinates: 39°16′15.5″N 81°33′56.5″W
- Carries: CSX Transportation (Leased to Belpre Industrial Parkersburg Railroad)
- Crosses: Ohio River
- Locale: Parkersburg, West Virginia
- Official name: Parkersburg Bridge
- Maintained by: CSX Transportation

Characteristics
- Design: Truss bridge
- Total length: 7,140 feet (2,180 m)

History
- Opened: 1871
- Sixth Street Railroad Bridge
- U.S. National Register of Historic Places
- Location within West Virginia Location within the United States
- Location: 6th Street, Parkersburg, West Virginia
- Coordinates: 39°16′2″N 81°33′32″W
- Area: 0.8 acres (0.32 ha)
- Built: 18 May 1869 – 7 January 1871
- Architect: Porter, W. E.
- MPS: Downtown Parkersburg MRA
- NRHP reference No.: 82001785
- Added to NRHP: 10 December 1982

Location
- Interactive map of Parkersburg Bridge

The Parkersburg Bridge crosses the Ohio River between Parkersburg, West Virginia, and Belpre, Ohio. Designed by Jacob Linville, the bridge has 46 spans: 25 deck plate girder, 14 deck truss, 6 through truss, and 1 through plate girder. 50,000 cubic yards (38,000 m^{3}) of stone were used for the 53 piers. The bridge was constructed from May 1869 to January 1871 by the Baltimore and Ohio Railroad. At the time of its completion, the bridge was reportedly the longest in the world at 7,140 feet (2,180 m).

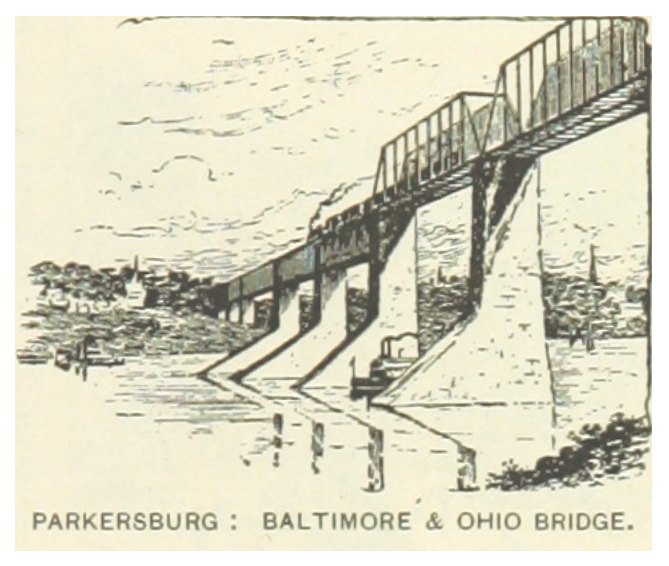
1893

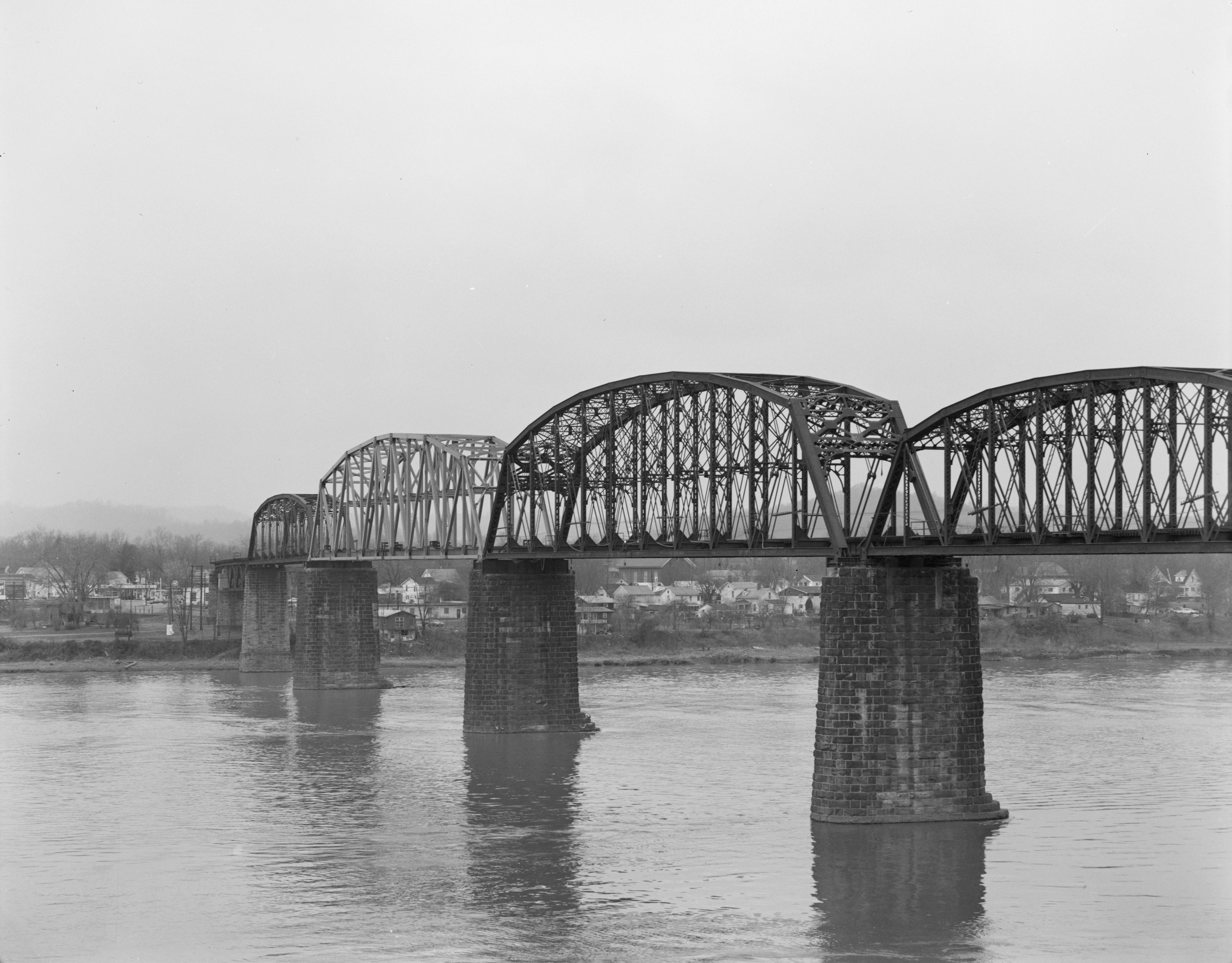
The bridge in 1973

The approach spans were replaced 1898–1900, and the river spans were replaced 1904–1905. The original piers were retained. The steel structure atop the piers was rebuilt between about 1914 and 1917. One channel span was replaced in 1972 after a barge transporting an empty gasoline tanker exploded under the bridge.

The bridge was a part of the B&O's Baltimore – St. Louis mainline and offered the railroad easy access to Ohio in transporting coal and other materials to the east coast. Currently the bridge handles the traffic of the Belpre Industrial Parkersburg Railroad.

It was listed on the National Register of Historic Places in 1982 under the name Sixth Street Railroad Bridge. At the time of the listing, the bridge was still owned by the Baltimore and Ohio Railroad.

== See also ==
- List of bridges documented by the Historic American Engineering Record in Ohio
- List of bridges documented by the Historic American Engineering Record in West Virginia
- List of crossings of the Ohio River
- National Register of Historic Places listings in Wood County, West Virginia
