= Belpre, Ohio =

- City
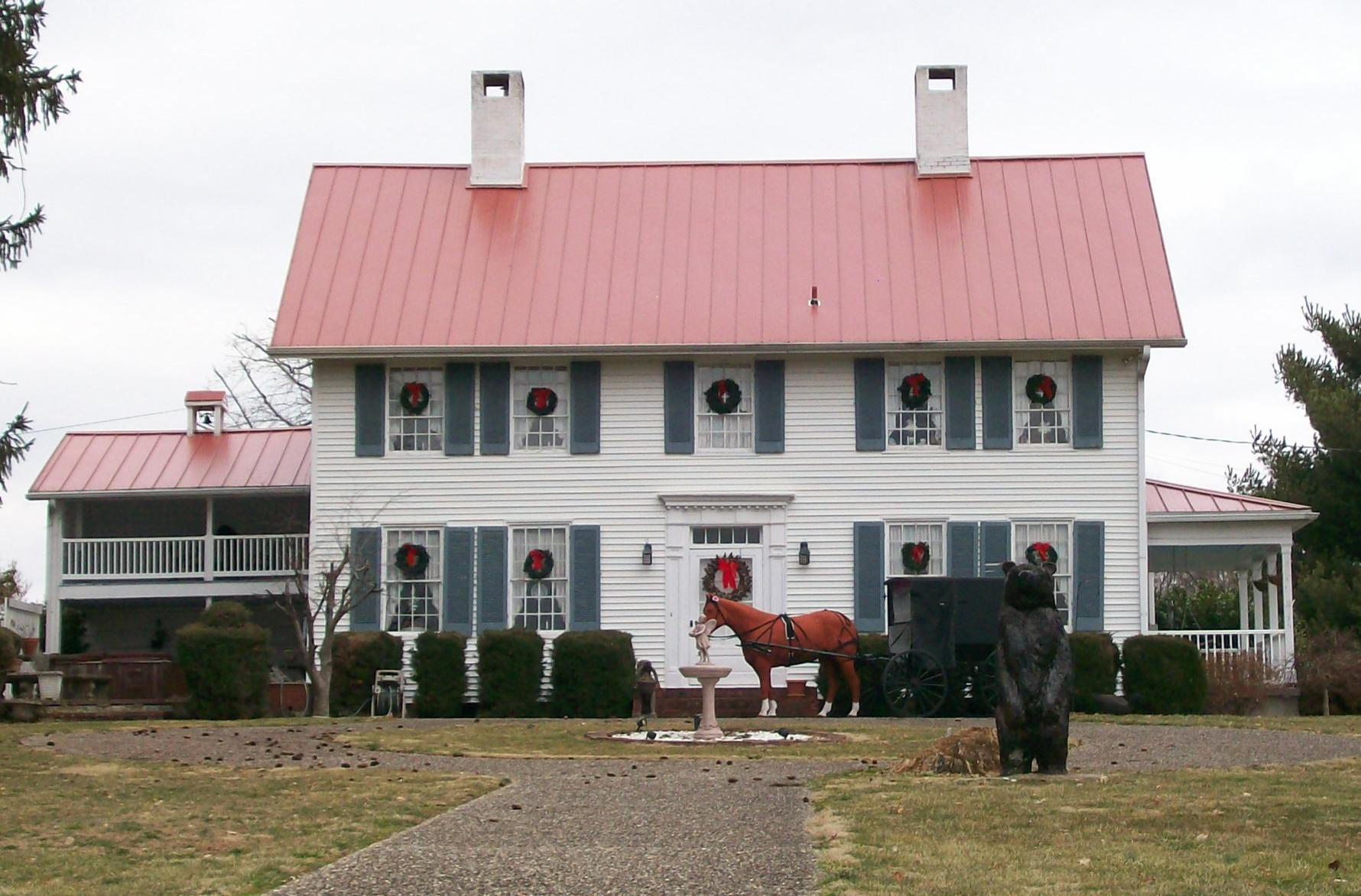
- The Captain Jonathan Stone House (1799) is the oldest existing building in Belpre.
- Motto: "Excellent Community, Excellent People"
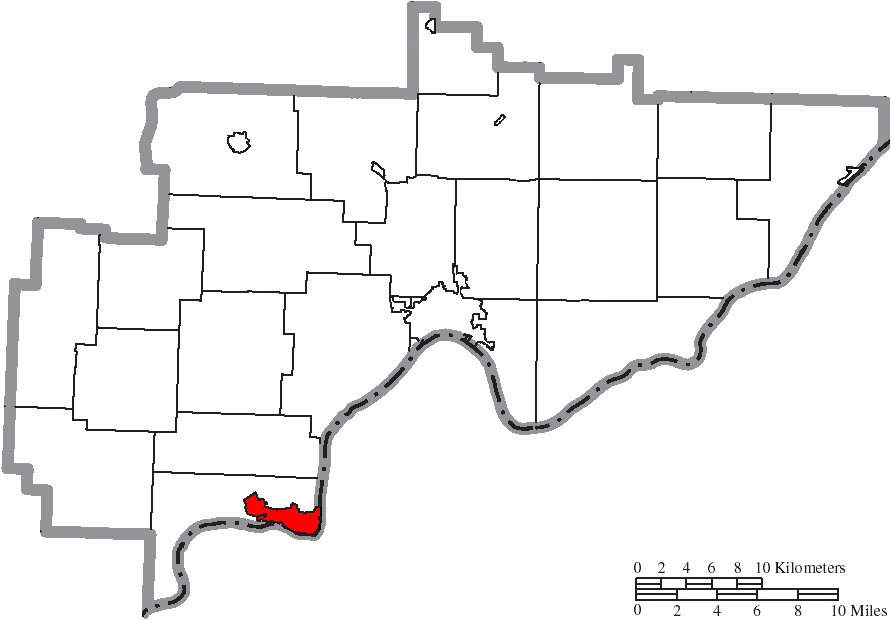
- Location of Belpre in Washington County

- Location within Ohio Location within the United States
- Coordinates: 39°17′10″N 81°36′45″W
- Country: United States
- State: Ohio
- County: Washington

Government
  - Mayor: Susan J. Abdella (R)

Area
  - Total: 3.57 sq mi (9.24 km^{2})
  - Land: 3.49 sq mi (9.03 km^{2})
  - Water: 0.081 sq mi (0.21 km^{2})
- Elevation: 659 ft (201 m)

Population (2020)
  - Total: 6,728
  - Estimate (2023): 6,614
  - Density: 1,930.6/sq mi (745.42/km^{2})
- Time zone: UTC-5 (Eastern)
  - Summer (DST): UTC-4 (EDT)
- ZIP code: 45714
- Area code: 740
- FIPS code: 39-05424
- GNIS feature ID: 1087127
- Website: https://www.cityofbelpre.com/

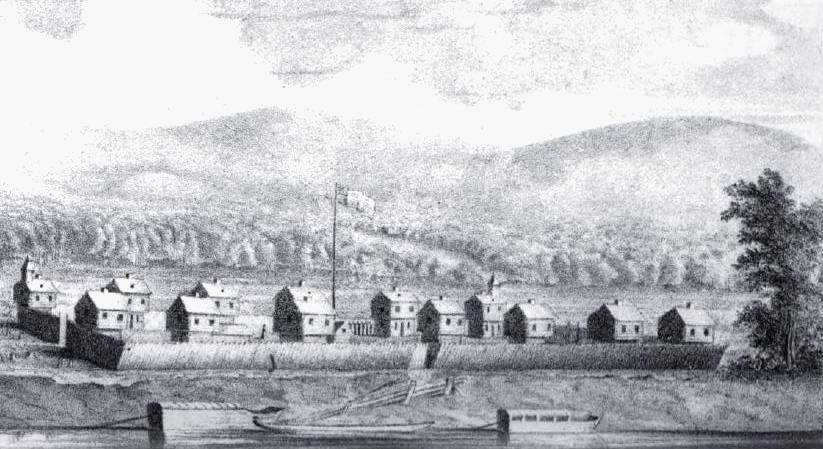
Farmer's Castle fortification at Belpre during the Northwest Indian War

Belpre (historically spelled Belpré; pronounced /ˈbɛlpri/ BEL-pree) is a city in Washington County, Ohio, United States, along the Ohio River across from Parkersburg, West Virginia. The population was 6,728 at the 2020 census. Its name derives from "Belle Prairie" (French for "beautiful meadow"), the name given to the valley by French trappers prior to the first American settlement at the site.

Part of the Marietta micropolitan area, Belpre is located about 14 miles (22 km) downriver from Marietta. In 1870, the Baltimore and Ohio Railroad completed the Parkersburg Bridge (CSX) across the river; at 7,140 feet (2,180 m), it was reportedly the longest in the world.

== History ==
The first settlement at Belpre was made in 1788. In 1845 railroad developers founded the Belpre and Cincinnati Railroad, but the destination was changed to Marietta, with a corresponding name change in 1851. For a considerable period of time, travelers had to go by steamboat to connect between Marietta and Parkersburg, Virginia; the latter received service from the Baltimore and Ohio Railroad in 1857. This was shortly before the western part of Virginia seceded in 1861 after the start of the American Civil War to form Unionist West Virginia. Belpre and Marietta were later connected by rail. Coal service is still active on this line.

From 1868–1870, the B&O built the Parkersburg Bridge (CSX) between West Virginia and Belpre, on its main line to St. Louis, Missouri. Designed by Jacob Linville, when completed in 1870 the bridge was reportedly the longest in the world at 7,140 feet (2,180 m). The bridge attracted more trade to the town, enabled shipping Ohio coal to the East Coast, and improved access on both sides of the river.

Developing in a different pattern from the more industrial cities of eastern Ohio, Belpre reached its peak of population in 1980. It has had some losses since then with the decline of heavy industry, but is relatively stable compared to the former industrial cities, which have lost half their residents since peaks in 1940 and 1950. A small settlement, Rockland, has been absorbed into the Belpre community.

== Geography ==
According to the United States Census Bureau, the city has a total area of 3.57 square miles (9.25 km^{2}), of which 3.49 square miles (9.04 km^{2}) is land and 0.08 square miles (0.21 km^{2}) is water.

=== Climate ===
The climate in this area is characterized by relatively high temperatures and evenly distributed precipitation throughout the year. According to the Köppen Climate Classification system, Belpre has a Humid subtropical climate, abbreviated "Cfa" on climate maps.

Climate data for Belpre, Ohio
Month	Jan	Feb	Mar	Apr	May	Jun	Jul	Aug	Sep	Oct	Nov	Dec	Year
Mean daily maximum °F (°C)	41 (5)	44 (7)	54 (12)	65 (18)	75 (24)	83 (28)	86 (30)	85 (29)	79 (26)	67 (19)	55 (13)	44 (7)	65 (18)
Daily mean °F (°C)	32 (0)	35 (2)	43 (6)	54 (12)	63 (17)	72 (22)	75 (24)	74 (23)	68 (20)	56 (13)	45 (7)	36 (2)	54 (12)
Mean daily minimum °F (°C)	24 (−4)	25 (−4)	33 (1)	42 (6)	52 (11)	61 (16)	65 (18)	63 (17)	56 (13)	45 (7)	36 (2)	27 (−3)	44 (7)
Average precipitation inches (cm)	3 (7.6)	2.7 (6.9)	3.6 (9.1)	3.3 (8.4)	3.8 (9.7)	4.1 (10)	4.4 (11)	3.7 (9.4)	2.9 (7.4)	2.4 (6.1)	2.8 (7.1)	2.9 (7.4)	39.5 (100)
Source: Weatherbase

== Demographics ==
Historical population
Census	Pop.	Note	%±
1870	911		—
1880	901		−1.1%
1890	1,007		11.8%
1910	1,249		—
1920	1,317		5.4%
1930	1,724		30.9%
1940	1,717		−0.4%
1950	2,451		42.7%
1960	5,418		121.1%
1970	7,189		32.7%
1980	7,193		0.1%
1990	6,796		−5.5%
2000	6,660		−2.0%
2010	6,441		−3.3%
2020	6,728		4.5%
2023 (est.)	6,614		−1.7%

=== 2020 census ===
As of the 2020 census, Belpre had a population of 6,728. The median age was 45.7 years. 19.3% of residents were under the age of 18 and 24.2% of residents were 65 years of age or older. For every 100 females there were 87.4 males, and for every 100 females age 18 and over there were 86.6 males age 18 and over.

98.8% of residents lived in urban areas, while 1.2% lived in rural areas.

There were 3,152 households in Belpre, of which 23.6% had children under the age of 18 living in them. Of all households, 37.3% were married-couple households, 20.6% were households with a male householder and no spouse or partner present, and 34.6% were households with a female householder and no spouse or partner present. About 36.9% of all households were made up of individuals and 17.9% had someone living alone who was 65 years of age or older.

There were 3,408 housing units, of which 7.5% were vacant. Among occupied housing units, 62.8% were owner-occupied and 37.2% were renter-occupied. The homeowner vacancy rate was 2.1% and the rental vacancy rate was 8.0%.

Racial composition as of the 2020 census
Race	Number	Percent
White	6,146	91.3%
Black or African American	116	1.7%
American Indian and Alaska Native	18	0.3%
Asian	45	0.7%
Native Hawaiian and Other Pacific Islander	3	<0.1%
Some other race	35	0.5%
Two or more races	365	5.4%
Hispanic or Latino (of any race)	76	1.1%

=== 2010 census ===
As of the 2010 United States census, there were 6,441 people, 3,053 households, and 1,788 families in the city. The population density was 712.5/sqmi (275.1/km^{2}). There were 3,351 housing units at an average density of 370.7/sqmi (143.1/km^{2}). The racial makeup of the city was 94.7% White, 2.1% African American, 0.2% Native American, 0.4% Asian, 0.1% Pacific Islander, 0.2% from other races, and 2.3% from two or more races. Hispanic or Latino of any race were 0.8% of the population.

There were 3,053 households, of which 24.1% had children under the age of 18 living with them, 41.6% were married couples living together, 13.4% had a female householder with no husband present, 3.6% had a male householder with no wife present, and 41.4% were non-families. 35.5% of all households were made up of individuals, and 15.8% had someone living alone who was 65 years of age or older. The average household size was 2.11 and the average family size was 2.71.

The median age in the city was 44.7 years. 18.8% of residents were under the age of 18; 7.8% were between the ages of 18 and 24; 23.8% were from 25 to 44; 28.9% were from 45 to 64; and 20.7% were 65 years of age or older. The gender makeup of the city was 46.7% male and 53.3% female.

=== 2000 census ===
As of the census of 2000, there were 6,660 people, 3,058 households, and 1,923 families in the city. The population density was 736.7/sqmi (284.5/km^{2}). There were 3,283 housing units at an average density of 363.2/sqmi (140.2/km^{2}). The racial makeup of the city was 96.01% White, 2.10% African American, 0.11% Native American, 0.42% Asian, 0.12% from other races, and 1.25% from two or more races. Hispanic or Latino of any race were 0.48% of the population.

There were 3,058 households, out of which 25.2% had children under the age of 18 living with them, 47.9% were married couples living together, 11.4% had a female householder with no husband present, and 37.1% were non-families. 32.7% of all households were made up of individuals, and 14.0% had someone living alone who was 65 years of age or older. The average household size was 2.18 and the average family size was 2.73.

In the city, the population was spread out, with 20.9% under the age of 18, 8.3% from 18 to 24, 26.4% from 25 to 44, 26.0% from 45 to 64, and 18.4% who were 65 years of age or older. The median age was 41 years. For every 100 females, there were 84.1 males. For every 100 females age 18 and over, there were 80.1 males.

The median income for a household in the city was $29,603, and the median income for a family was $36,401. Males had a median income of $31,743 versus $21,789 for females. The per capita income for the city was $18,195. About 12.1% of families and 15.2% of the population were below the poverty line, including 26.7% of those under age 18 and 7.6% of those age 65 or over.

== Education ==
Belpre City School District operates one elementary school and one high school.

Belpre has a public library, a branch of the Washington County Public Library.

== See also ==
- List of cities and towns along the Ohio River
